= Montgeron =

Commune in Île-de-France, France

- Commune
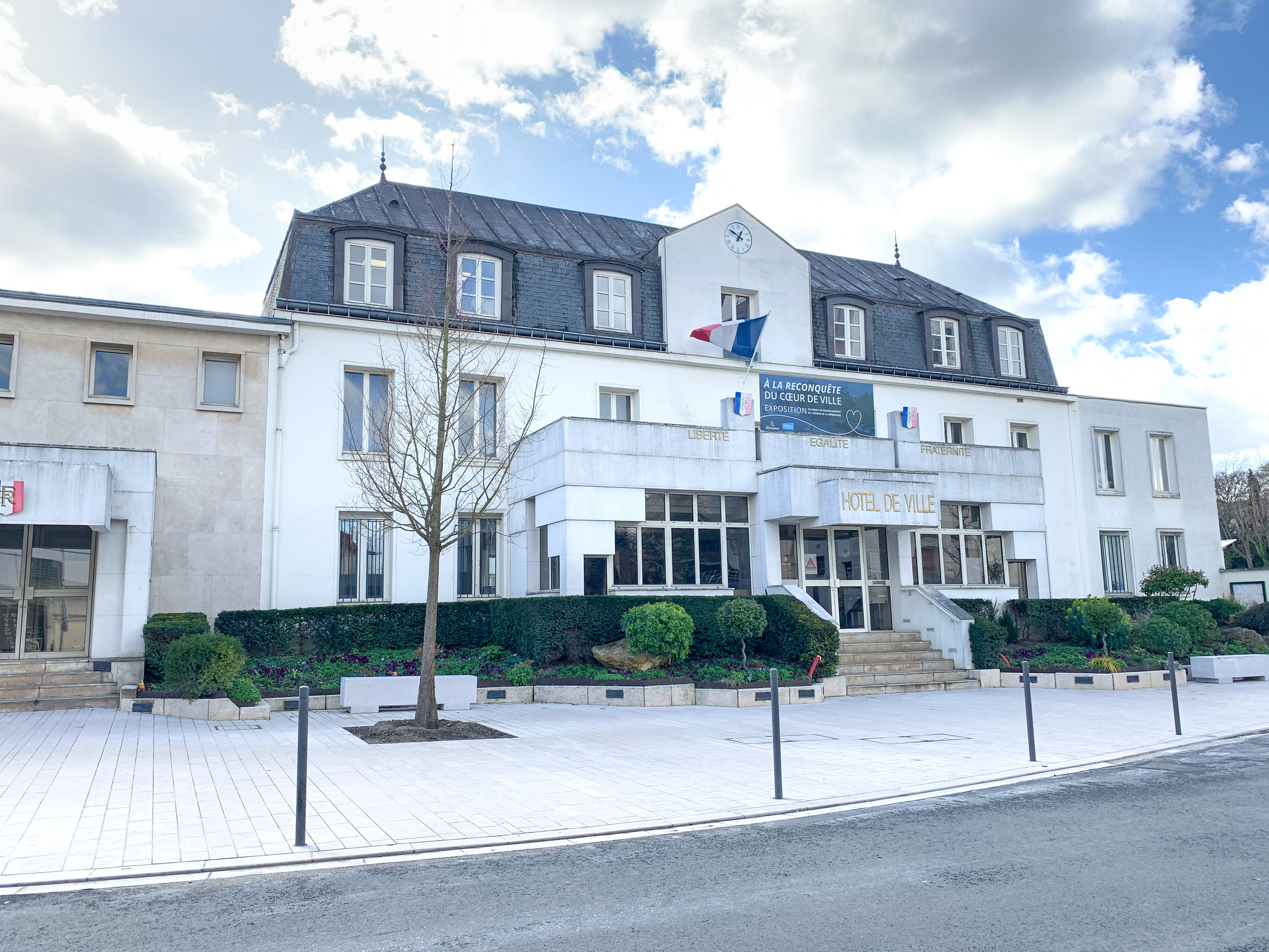
- The Hôtel de Ville

- Coat of arms

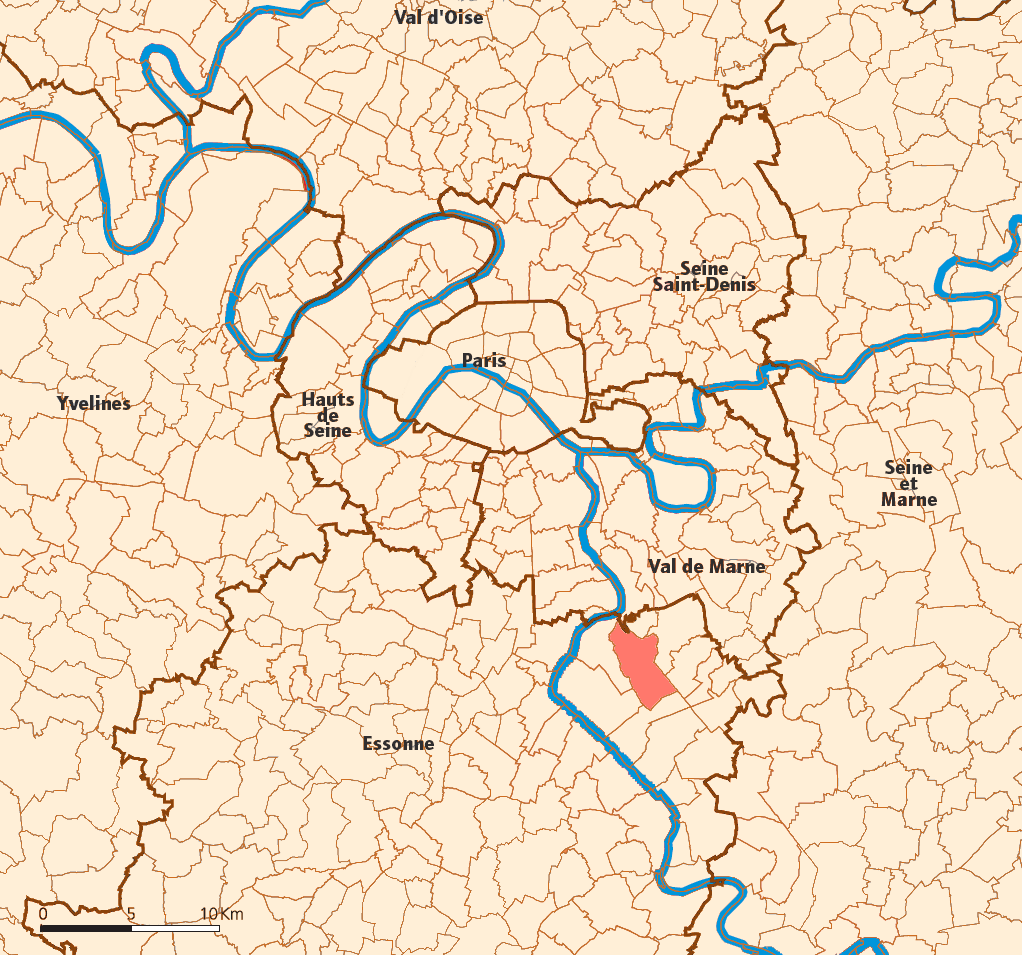
- Location (in red) within Paris inner and outer suburbs
- Location of Montgeron
- Location within France Location within Île-de-France (region)
- Coordinates: 48°42′14″N 2°27′38″E
- Country: France
- Region: Île-de-France
- Department: Essonne
- Arrondissement: Évry
- Canton: Draveil and Vigneux-sur-Seine
- Intercommunality: CA Val d'Yerres Val de Seine

Government
  - Mayor (2026–32): Sylvie Carillon (LR)
- Area^{1}: 11.22 km^{2} (4.33 sq mi)
- Elevation: 32 m (105 ft)
- Highest elevation: 88 m (289 ft)
- Lowest elevation: 31 m (102 ft)
- Population (2023): 24,022
  - Density: 2,141/km^{2} (5,545/sq mi)
- Time zone: UTC+01:00 (CET)
  - Summer (DST): UTC+02:00 (CEST)
- INSEE/Postal code: 91421 /91230
- ^{1} French Land Register data, which excludes lakes, ponds, glaciers > 1 km^{2} (0.386 sq mi or 247 acres) and river estuaries.

Montgeron (French pronunciation: [mɔ̃ʒ(ə)ʁɔ̃]) is a commune in the southeastern suburbs of Paris, France. It is in the northeast part of the department of Essonne. It is located 18.5 km (11.5 mi) from the center of Paris.

The café Au Reveil Matin at 22 Avenue Jean Jaurès was the departure point of the first Tour de France in 1903. Montgeron was also the starting point of the 21st (and last) stage of the 2017 Tour de France.

== History ==
The Hôtel de Ville dates from around 1750.

== Geography ==
=== Climate ===
Situated in the region of Île-de-France, Montgeron has an oceanic climate, with cool winters and mild summers, and has more precipitation than others in the central parts. The mean temperature is around 10.8 °C, with a maximum of 15.2 °C and a minimum of 6.4 °C. However, the actual temperatures recorded are 24.5 °C in July at the maximum and 0.7 °C in January at the minimum, but the records registered the maximum temperature of 38.2 °C on 1 July 1952 and the minimum temperature of -19.6 °C on 17 January 1985. Due to the lower urban density between Paris and its suburbs, a difference of one to two degrees Celsius is felt strongly. The amount of sunshine is comparable to the average of the regions of the north of the Loire with 1,798 hours per year. Precipitation is also distributed over the year, with a total of 598.3 millimeters of rain and an approximate average of fifty millimeters per month.

Climate data for departemental station of Brétigny-sur-Orge
Month	Jan	Feb	Mar	Apr	May	Jun	Jul	Aug	Sep	Oct	Nov	Dec	Year
Mean daily maximum °F (°C)	43.0 (6.1)	45.7 (7.6)	52.5 (11.4)	58.3 (14.6)	65.5 (18.6)	71.2 (21.8)	76.1 (24.5)	75.6 (24.2)	69.4 (20.8)	60.4 (15.8)	49.8 (9.9)	44.2 (6.8)	59.4 (15.2)
Daily mean °F (°C)	38.1 (3.4)	39.7 (4.3)	44.8 (7.1)	49.5 (9.7)	56.1 (13.4)	61.5 (16.4)	65.8 (18.8)	65.3 (18.5)	60.1 (15.6)	52.7 (11.5)	44.1 (6.7)	39.7 (4.3)	51.4 (10.8)
Mean daily minimum °F (°C)	33.3 (0.7)	33.8 (1.0)	37.0 (2.8)	40.6 (4.8)	46.9 (8.3)	52.0 (11.1)	55.4 (13.0)	55.0 (12.8)	50.7 (10.4)	45.0 (7.2)	38.3 (3.5)	35.1 (1.7)	43.5 (6.4)
Average precipitation inches (mm)	1.87 (47.6)	1.67 (42.5)	1.75 (44.4)	1.80 (45.6)	2.11 (53.7)	2.01 (51.0)	2.06 (52.2)	1.91 (48.5)	2.19 (55.6)	2.03 (51.6)	2.13 (54.1)	2.03 (51.5)	23.56 (598.3)
Mean monthly sunshine hours	59	89	134	176	203	221	240	228	183	133	79	53	1,798

=== Transport ===
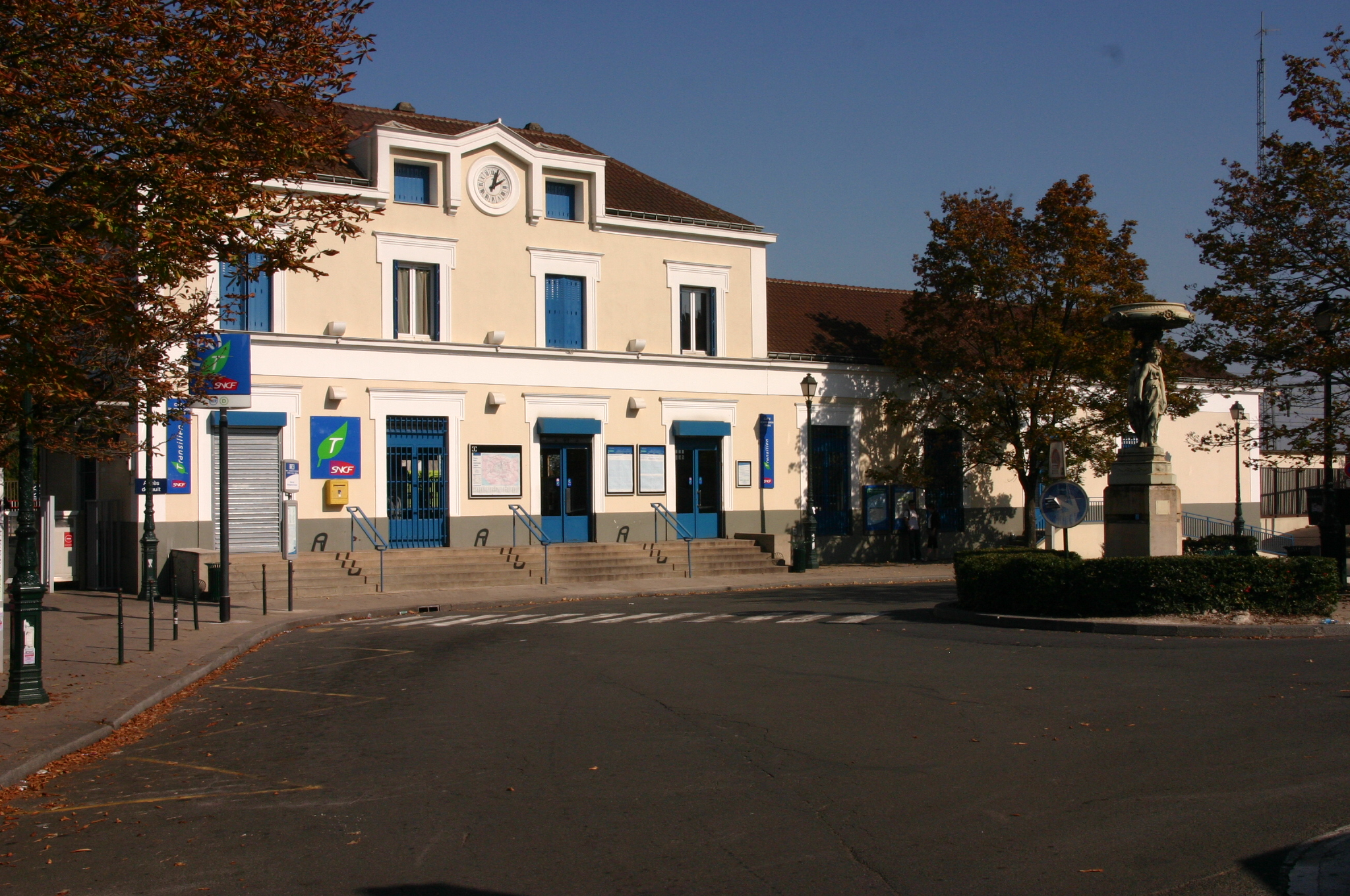
The outer view of Montgeron – Crosne station

Although Montgeron is away from the course of the Seine, major axes of communication cross at Montgeron, most of them inherited from before. It was crossed by the old National Road 6 (N6) but now the road takes a detour to the west of the city center; the route is now occupied by the Departemental Road 50 (D50). The road D50 intersects the east–west running Departemental Road 31 (D31), which the latter leads to the neighboring commune of Yerres. The new portion of N6 shares its northern part with the Departemental Road 448 (D448) which the latter follows the river Seine south to Corbeil-Essonnes.

Recent development and heavy traffic have made access to the city center much more difficult, which accentuates commercial desertification.

Since 1849, the Paris-Marseille railway passes through the northeast of Montgeron, now served by the Montgeron-Crosne station on the Paris RER line D. The rail link is complemented by several bus lines, including the Noctilien Line N134 ensuring services during the night(click this reference for the French Wikipedia:), line 91.09 of the Albatrans bus network, line 191-100 of the Mobilien network, lines A, E, P, Q and V of the STRAV bus network, and lines IV and 501 of the Seine Sénart Bus network have stops in Montgeron.

The town is located eight kilometers south-east of Paris-Orly Airport and thirty-four kilometers south of Paris-Charles-de-Gaulle Airport. Leisure and business aviation will be oriented towards the Melun-Villaroche air base, ultimately transformed into a tourism and business airport, located nineteen kilometers to the southeast.

== Politics ==
The mayor of Montgeron is Sylvie Carillon from The Republicans, starting from April 16, 2020. The commune of Montgeron is located in Essonne's 8th constituency, which includes Montgeron, Yerres, Brunoy, and Vigneux-sur-Seine. Their member of the National Assembly has been Nicolas Dupont-Aignan, the president of Debout la France, since 1997. He was first elected in 1997, followed by getting reelected in 2002, 2007, 2012, and 2017.

=== Intercommunality and Cantons ===
Montgeron is located inside the Communauté d'agglomération Val d'Yerres Val de Seine, which also includes Boussy-Saint-Antoine, Brunoy, Crosne, Draveil, Épinay-sous-Sénart, Quincy-sous-Sénart, Vigneux-sur-Seine, and Yerres. Montgeron, like Brunoy, is divided between two cantons. The Canton of Vigneux-sur-Seine includes the communes of Vigneux-sur-Seine, Crosne and the northern part of Montgeron. The Canton of Draveil includes the communes of Draveil, Soisy-sur-Seine, Saint-Germain-lès-Corbeil, Étiolles, and the southern part of Montgeron. The dividing line goes from the territorial limit of the municipality of Yerres, to the Avenue de la République (departmental road 50), Rue des Bois, Place de l'Europe, Avenue de la Grange, Avenue Charles-de-Gaulle, Rue de Mainville, Rue de la Croix-Saint-Marc, Rue des Plantes, Rue Édouard-Branly, Rue de la Garenne, Rue de la Belle-Aimée, Chemin du Dessus-du-Luet to n ° 117, then to the right of n ° 117 of Chemin du Dessus-du-Luet straight to National Road 6, Rue des Saules, Rue des Jacinthes, up to the territorial limit of the municipality of Vigneux-sur-Seine.

=== Twin Towns ===
- Eschborn, Hesse, Germany starting from 1985.
- Magog, Quebec, Canada starting from 1986.
- Póvoa de Varzim, Norte, Portugal starting from 1986.
- Viernau, Thuringia, Germany starting from 1992.
- Harrison, New York, United States

== Populations and Society ==
=== Demographics ===
Historical population

Year	Pop.	±% p.a.
1793	851	—
1800	896	+0.74%
1806	864	−0.60%
1821	858	−0.05%
1831	923	+0.73%
1836	989	+1.39%
1841	1,023	+0.68%
1846	1,108	+1.61%
1851	1,015	−1.74%
1856	1,122	+2.02%
1861	1,478	+5.67%
1866	1,690	+2.72%
1872	1,667	−0.23%
1876	1,876	+3.00%
1881	1,955	+0.83%
1886	1,965	+0.10%
1891	1,950	−0.15%
1896	2,192	+2.37%
1901	2,346	+1.37%

Year	Pop.	±% p.a.
1906	2,942	+4.63%
1911	3,494	+3.50%
1921	4,479	+2.51%
1926	6,539	+7.86%
1931	8,679	+5.83%
1936	9,801	+2.46%
1946	10,564	+0.75%
1954	12,271	+1.89%
1962	15,486	+2.95%
1968	21,768	+5.84%
1975	23,786	+1.27%
1982	22,039	−1.08%
1990	21,667	−0.21%
1999	21,905	+0.12%
2007	22,929	+0.57%
2012	23,281	+0.31%
2017	23,775	+0.42%
2023	24,022	+0.17%

Source: EHESS (1793-1990) and INSEE

Placed on the important road from Paris to Melun at the edge of the Sénart Forest, Montgeron was a town already counting more than eight hundred and fifty people at the time of the first census of people in 1793. A period of chaotic evolution ensued with a growth to nearly nine hundred inhabitants in 1800 and a decrease until 1851. The milestone of nine hundred residents was reached in 1831 and that of the thousand residents ten years later. From 1856, following the arrival of the railway, a period of constant progress began, only briefly interrupted by the losses due to the Franco-Prussian War of 1870, the milestone of two thousand inhabitants being crossed in 1896. At During the twentieth century, the two world conflicts did not prevent the local population explosion, driven by massive urbanization which allowed the town to have nearly four thousand five hundred inhabitants in 1921 and more than ten thousand in 1946. This the figure doubled in the following twelve years and reached the historic peak of twenty-three thousand seven hundred eighty-six in 1975. The urban rehabilitation operations and the decline in enthusiasm for this town made it lose two thousand people in fifteen years before it returned to demographic growth from 1999, again negative in view of the 2007 figures establishing the Montgeron population to twenty-two thousand nine hundred twenty-nine people. Immigration has little impact on this demographic development since only 7.6% of the municipal population was foreign in 1999. In that year, the largest communities were distributed between 3.2% of the total for Portuguese population, 0.9% for Algerians, 0.5% for Moroccans, 0.4% for Turks and Italians, 0.3% for Tunisians and 0.2% for Spaniards.

Inhabitants of Montgeron are known as Montgeronnais in French.

=== Facilities ===
There is a library called Médiathèque du Carré d'Art, a post office, and the Avenue de la République has restaurants and shops.

== Notable people ==
- The local school (J-C Gatinot) was decorated by painter Maurice Boitel
- Paul-Marcel Dammann (1885–1939), engraver
- Josèphe Jacquiot (1910-1995), numismatist
