= Boussy-Saint-Antoine station =

Train station (Paris RER)

Boussy-Saint-Antoine
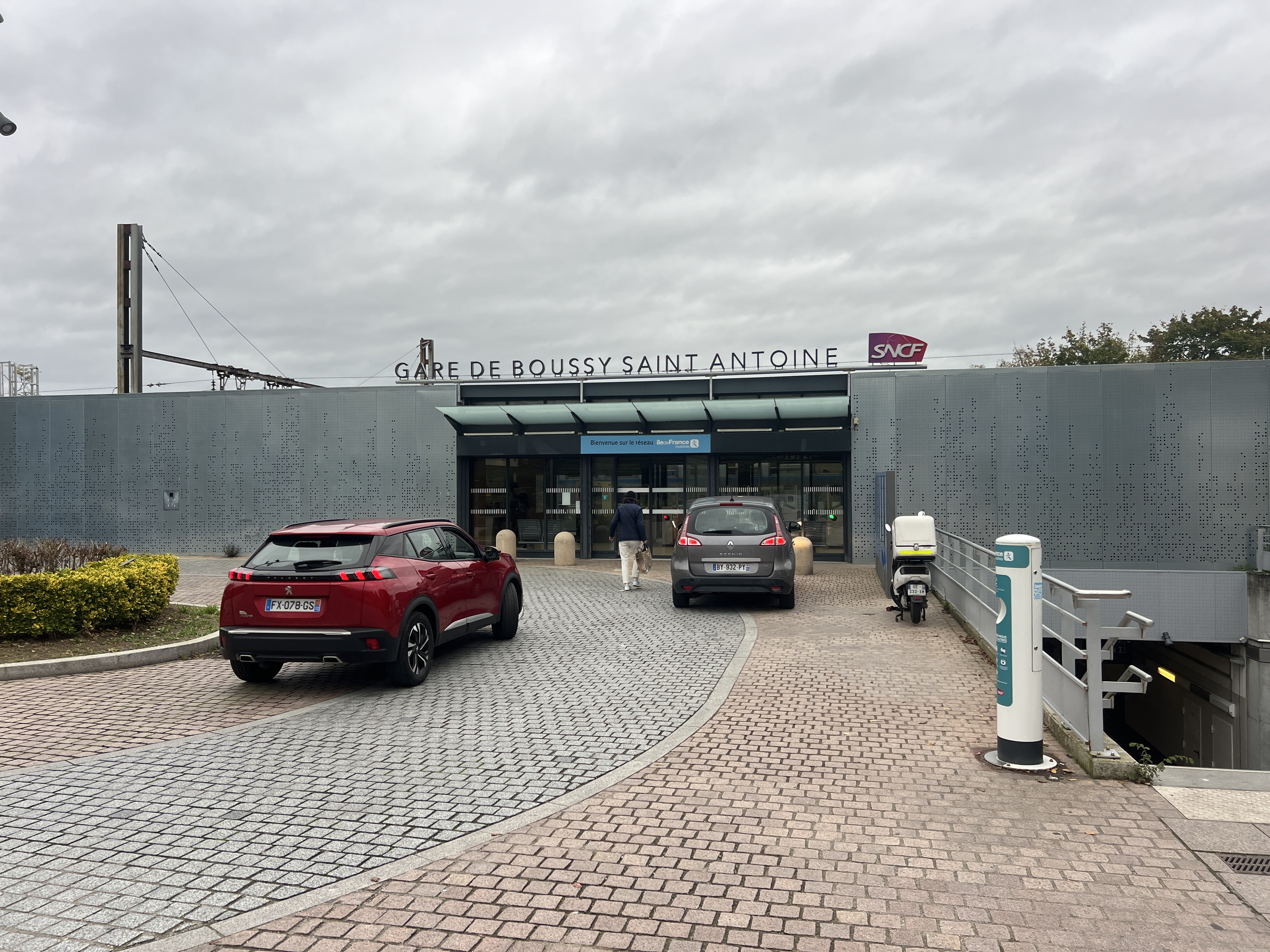
- Boussy-Saint-Antoine station

General information
- Location: Boussy-Saint-Antoine and Quincy-sous-Senart, Essonne, Île-de-France, France
- Coordinates: 48°24′18″N 2°18′58″E
- Elevation: 72 m (236 ft)
- Operator: SNCF
- Lines: Paris–Marseille railway RER D
- Platforms: 3 (2 side and 1 central)
- Tracks: 4
- Train operators: SNCF
- Connections: Noctilien Line N134(see here:)

Construction
- Accessible: Yes, by prior reservation

Other information
- Station code: 87682138
- Fare zone: 5

History
- Opened: June 1969

Passengers
- 2024: 3,475,621

Services
Preceding station	RER	Following station
Brunoy towards Goussainville	RER D	Combs-la-Ville–Quincy towards Melun
Location

Boussy-Saint-Antoine is a railway station on the border of Boussy-Saint-Antoine and Quincy-sous-Senart, both in Essonne, Île-de-France, France. The station was opened in 1995 and is on the Paris–Marseille railway. The station is served by the RER Line D, which is operated by SNCF. The station serves the communes of Boussy-Saint-Antoine, Épinay-sous-Sénart and Quincy-sous-Senart.

== Station info ==
Situated at an altitude at 72 meters above sea level, the station is on the 23.958 kilometer point of the Paris-Marseille railway, between the stations of Brunoy and Combs-la-Ville–Quincy. The station served 3,475,621 people in 2024.

== Train services ==
The following services serve the station:

- Local services (RER D) Goussainville – Saint-Denis – Gare de Lyon – Villeneuve-Saint-Georges – Boussy-Saint-Antoine – Combs-la-Ville–Quincy – Melun
- Local services (RER D) Gare de Lyon – Maison Alfort-Alfortville – Villeneuve-Saint-Georges – Boussy-Saint-Antoine – Combs-la-Ville–Quincy – Melun
