= Crosne, Essonne =

Commune in Île-de-France, France

Crosne
- Commune
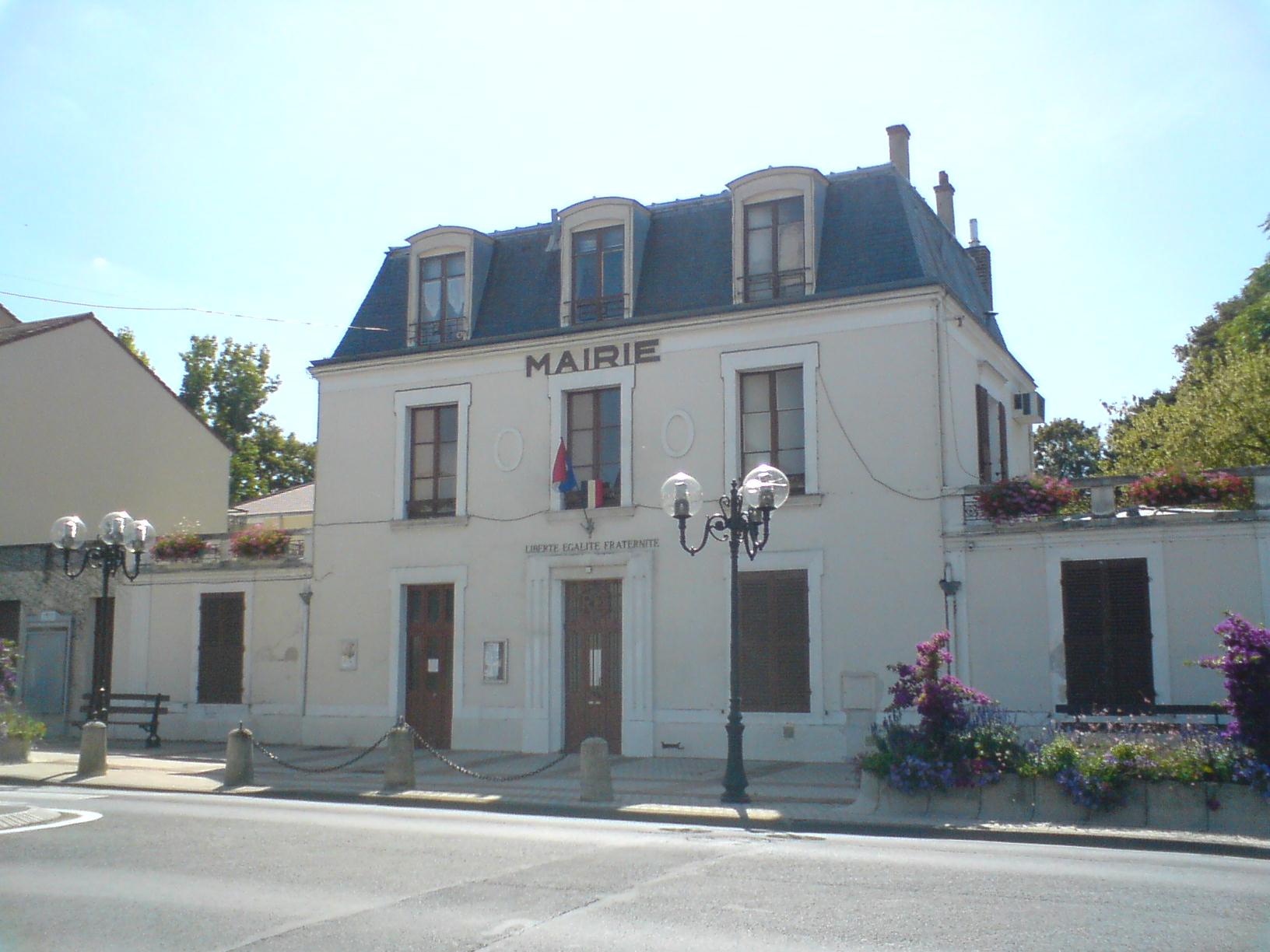
- The town hall of Crosne

- Coat of arms
- Location of Crosne
- Location within France Location within Île-de-France (region)
- Coordinates: 48°42′59″N 2°27′29″E
- Country: France
- Region: Île-de-France
- Department: Essonne
- Arrondissement: Évry
- Canton: Vigneux-sur-Seine
- Intercommunality: CA Val d'Yerres Val de Seine

Government
  - Mayor (2020–2026): Michaël Damiati
- Area^{1}: 2.48 km^{2} (0.96 sq mi)
- Highest elevation: 92 m (302 ft)
- Lowest elevation: 30 m (98 ft)
- Population (2023): 9,610
  - Density: 3,870/km^{2} (10,000/sq mi)
- Time zone: UTC+01:00 (CET)
  - Summer (DST): UTC+02:00 (CEST)
- INSEE/Postal code: 91191 /91560
- ^{1} French Land Register data, which excludes lakes, ponds, glaciers > 1 km^{2} (0.386 sq mi or 247 acres) and river estuaries.

Crosne (French pronunciation: [kʁon]) is a commune in the Essonne department, in the Île-de-France region in northern France. It is also a suburb of Paris, located 18 km from the center of Paris.

== Climate ==
Crosne is located in Île-de-France and enjoys a degraded oceanic climate with cool winters and mild summers, and has regular rainfall throughout the year. The annual average temperature is 10.8 °C, with a maximum of 15.2 °C and a minimum of 6.4 °C. The temperatures per month recorded are 24.5 °C in July at the maximum and 0.7 °C in January at the minimum, but the registered records are 38.2 °C on 1 July 1952 and −19.6 °C on 17 January 1985. Due to the lower urban density between Paris and its suburbs, a negative difference of one to two degrees Celsius is felt strongly. The amount of sunshine is comparable to the average for the northern regions of the Loire with 1,798 hours per year. Precipitation is evenly distributed over the year, with a total of 598.3 millimeters of rain and an approximate average of fifty millimeters per month.

== Population ==
Historical population
Year	Pop.	±% p.a.
1968	5,324	—
1975	6,068	+1.89%
1982	7,312	+2.70%
1990	7,966	+1.08%
1999	8,154	+0.26%
2007	9,094	+1.37%
2012	9,191	+0.21%
2017	9,231	+0.09%
2023	9,610	+0.67%
Source: INSEE

Inhabitants of Crosne are known as Crosnois in French.

== Transport ==
Crosne is served by Montgeron-Crosne station on the Paris RER line D.

== Twin towns – sister cities ==
Crosne is twinned with:

- Belœil, Belgium (1964)
- Schotten, Germany (1964)
- Maybole, Scotland, United Kingdom (1982)
- Rýmařov, Czech Republic (1999)

== Politics ==
The mayor of Crosne is Michaël Damiati from Debout la France, starting from 30 March 2014. The commune of Crosne is located in Essonne's 8th constituency, which includes Vigneux-sur-Seine(The Canton of Vigneux-sur-Seine, includes Crosne), Montgeron, Yerres, and Brunoy. Their member of the National Assembly has been Nicolas Dupont-Aignan, the president of Debout la France, since 1997. He was first elected in 1997, followed by getting reelected in 2002, 2007, 2012, and 2017.

== See also ==
- Communes of the Essonne department
