= Épinay-sous-Sénart =

- Town
- Town Hall

- Coat of arms
- Location of Épinay-sous-Sénart
- Location within France Location within Île-de-France (region)
- Coordinates: 48°41′41″N 2°30′53″E
- Country: France
- Region: Île-de-France
- Department: Essonne
- Arrondissement: Évry
- Canton: Épinay-sous-Sénart
- Intercommunality: CA Val d'Yerres Val de Seine

Government
  - Mayor (2026–32): Damien Allouch (PS)
- Area^{1}: 3.58 km^{2} (1.38 sq mi)
- Highest elevation: 87 m (285 ft)
- Lowest elevation: 37 m (121 ft)
- Population (2023): 11,611
  - Density: 3,240/km^{2} (8,400/sq mi)
- Demonym: Spinoliens
- Time zone: UTC+01:00 (CET)
  - Summer (DST): UTC+02:00 (CEST)
- INSEE/Postal code: 91215 /91860
- Dialling codes: +33 1
- Website: ville-epinay-senart.fr
- ^{1} French Land Register data, which excludes lakes, ponds, glaciers > 1 km^{2} (0.386 sq mi or 247 acres) and river estuaries.

Épinay-sous-Sénart (French pronunciation: [epinɛ su senaʁ]) is a commune in the Essonne department of the Île-de-France region and in the southern suburbs of Paris, France. The town is bordered by the Yerres, right bank tributary of the Seine and the Forest of Sénart. It is located 20.6 km (12.8 mi) from the center of Paris.

== Population ==
Inhabitants of Épinay-sous-Sénart are known as Spinoliens in French.

Historical population
Year	Pop.	±% p.a.
1968	2,706	—
1975	14,857	+27.54%
1982	14,735	−0.12%
1990	13,374	−1.20%
1999	12,797	−0.49%
2007	12,652	−0.14%
2012	12,434	−0.35%
2017	12,446	+0.02%
2023	11,611	−1.15%
Source: INSEE

== Transport ==
=== Rail ===
Épinay-sous-Sénart is served by Brunoy station and Yerres station on Paris RER line D to Paris Gare de Lyon railway station.

=== Bus ===
The city is also serviced by several bus lines of Keolis company.

=== Air ===
The nearest airport is Paris Orly Airport.

== Education ==
=== Primary and secondary education ===
The town has the primary schools of :

- Pré-aux-Agneaux
- Alphonse-Daudet
- Jacques-Brel
- Georges-Brassens
- Croix-Rochopt

The Vallée college and the Maurice-Eliot general and technological high school.

== Notable people ==
- Paul-Romain Chaperon (1808-1876) engineer
- Eugène Ritt (1817-1898) director of the Paris Opera
- Maurice Eliot (1862-1945) artist and painter
  Eugène Ritt

== Twin towns – sister cities ==
Épinay-sous-Sénart is twinned with :

- Peacehaven (England, United Kingdom), since 1989
- Isernhagen (Germany), since 1989

== Gallery ==
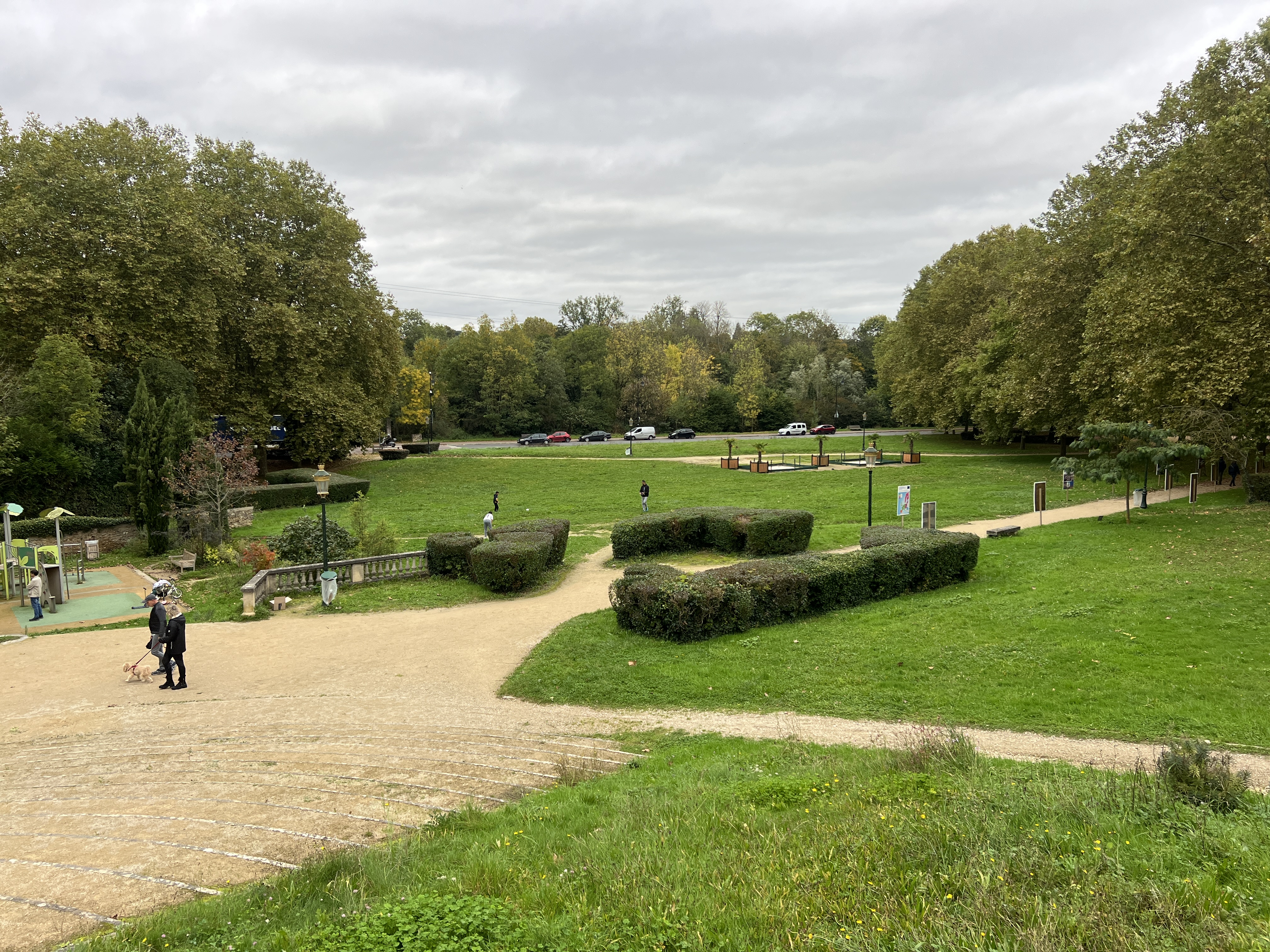
Parc of Europe

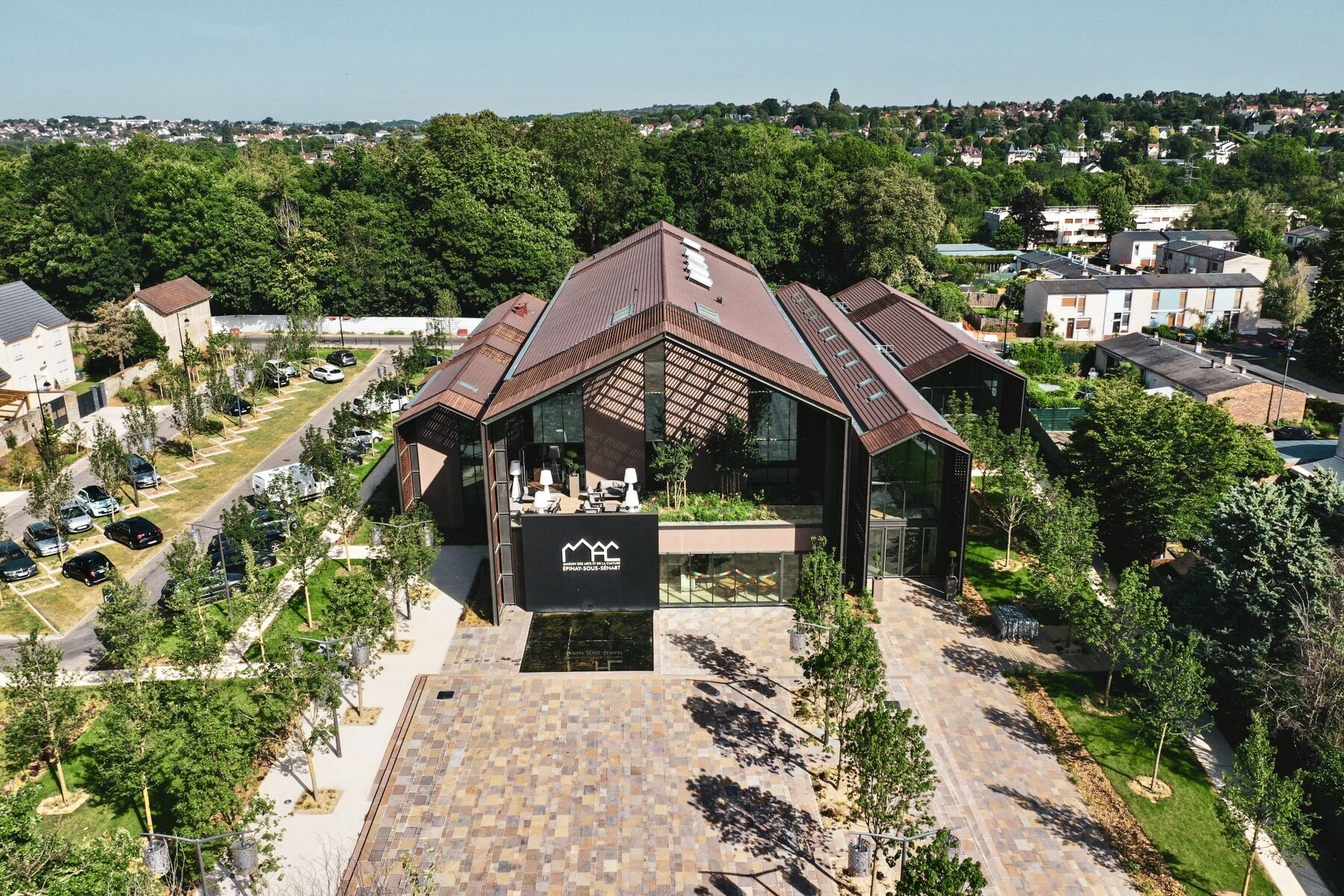
House of Arts and Culture

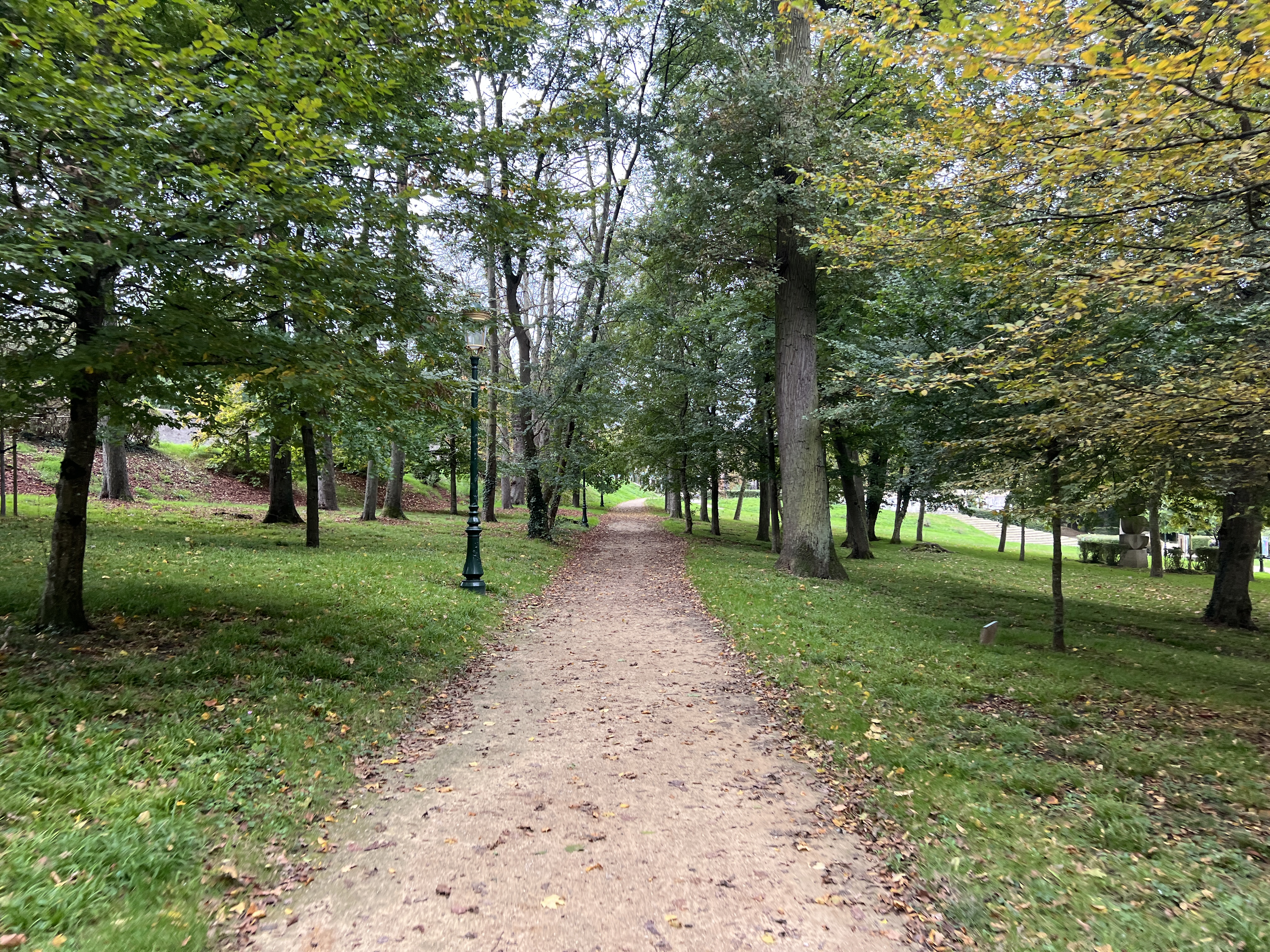
View of the parc

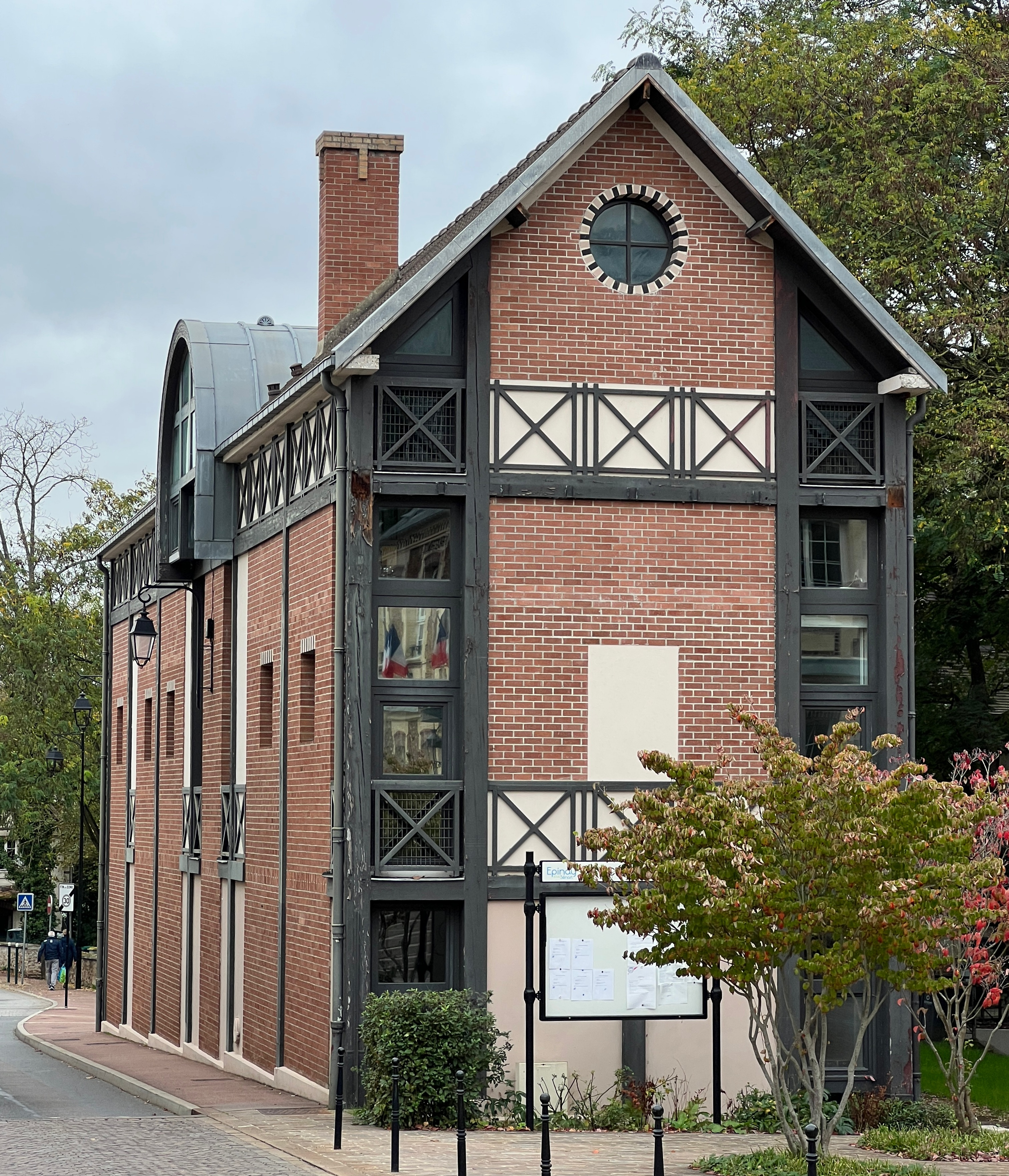
Conservatoire of music

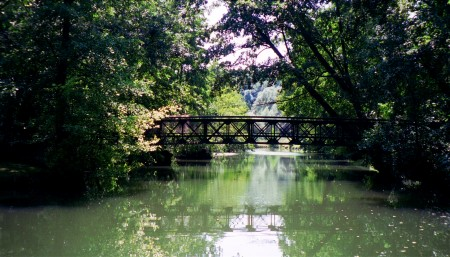
The Yerres

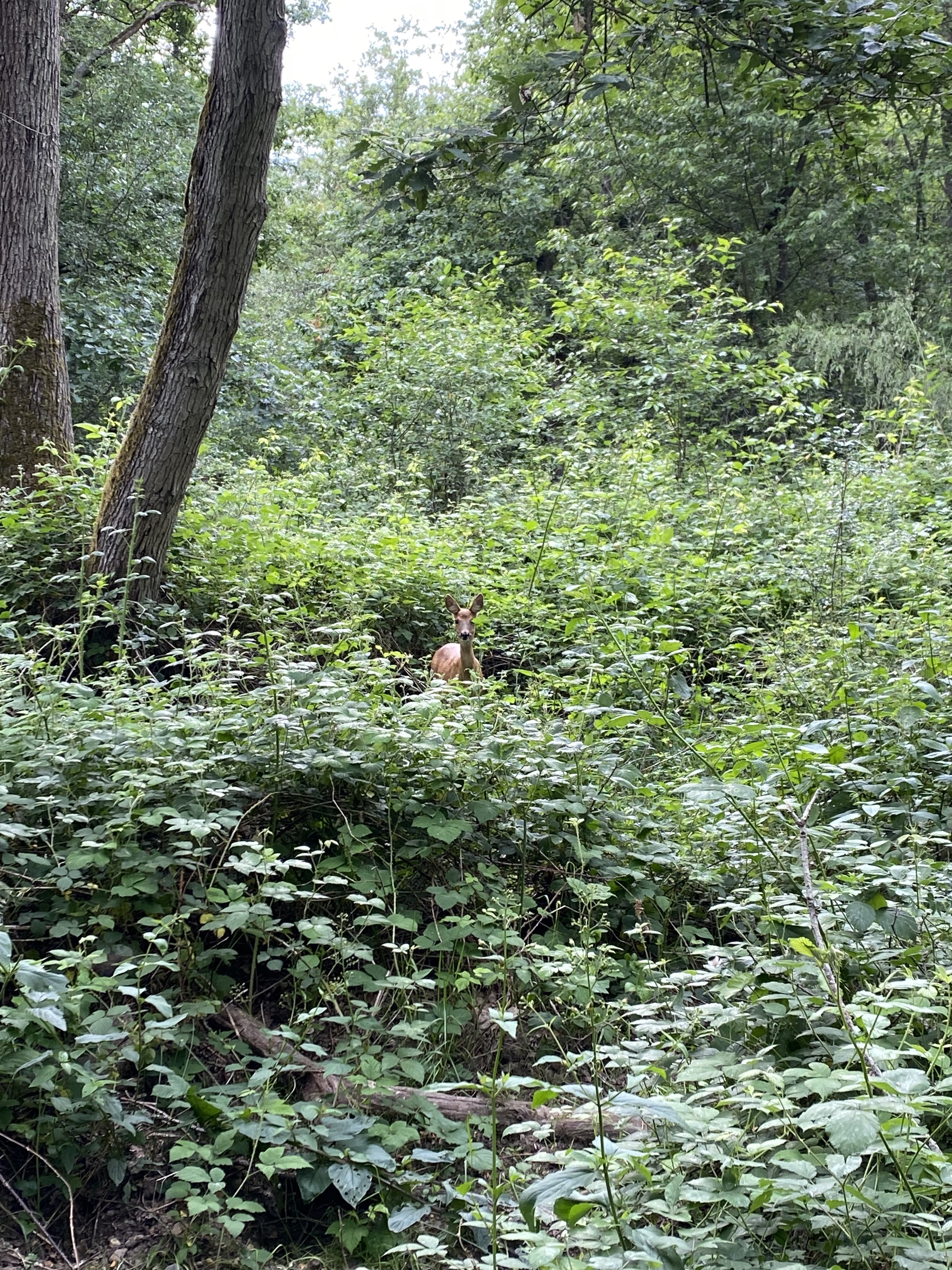
Forest of Sénart

== See also ==
- Communes of the Essonne department
- List of tourist attractions in Paris
