= Hôtel de Ville, Montgeron =

Town hall in Montgeron, France

Hôtel de Ville
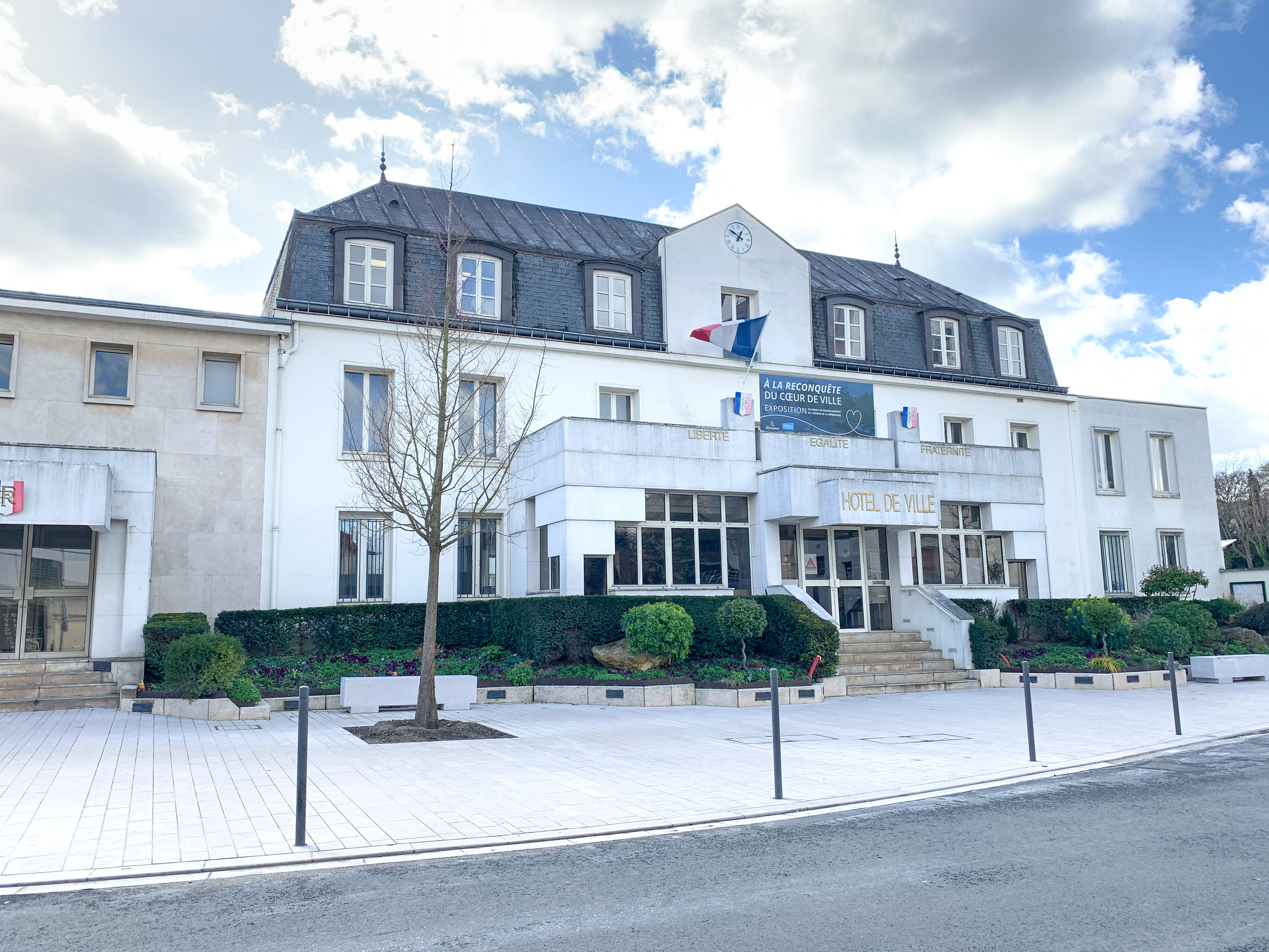
- The main frontage of the Hôtel de Ville in March 2019
- Interactive map of the Hôtel de Ville area

General information
- Type: City hall
- Architectural style: Neoclassical style
- Location: Montgeron, France
- Coordinates: 48.7039°N 2.4605°E
- Completed: c.1750

The Hôtel de Ville (French pronunciation: [otɛl də vil], City Hall) is a municipal building in Montgeron, Essonne, in the southeastern suburbs of Paris, standing on Avenue de la République.

== History ==
Following the French Revolution meetings of the town council were originally held in the old church on what is now Place des Tilleuls, and later at the home of the mayor at the time and, after that, in rented accommodation. This arrangement continued until the mid-19th century when the council led by the mayor, Edouard Gaspar Bonfils, decided to commission a dedicated town hall. The site selected they selected, 400 metres (1,300 ft) southeast along Avenue de la République, formed the northwest side of a new village square (now Place de Rottembourg) which also accommodated a new church, a public fountain and new schools. The land was given to the council by General Henri Rottembourg who had served as the general officer commanding a division in the Napoleonic Wars.

The new building was designed in the neoclassical style, built in brick with a cement render and was completed in 1858. The design involved a symmetrical main frontage of three bays facing onto Avenue de la République. The central bay featured a doorway with a canopy, while the rest of the building was fenestrated by casement windows, and there was a cornice at roof level. After the building was no longer required for municipal purposes, it was converted for use as the local maternity and child health centre.

A public fountain on the right-hand side of the town hall was augmented by the Trois Grâces (three graces), an ornamental group of three female figures created by the sculptor, Mathurin Moreau, in 1875. A war memorial, intended to commemorate the lives of local service personnel who had died in the First World War, was created by the sculptor, Paul-Marcel Dammann, and installed on the left-hand side of the town hall in December 1922.

In the early years of the Second World War, following significant population growth, the council decided to acquire a more substantial building for municipal use. The building they selected, located a further 500 metres (1,600 ft) southeast along Avenue de la République, was the home of the Labriet family. The building had been commissioned as a public house in around 1750 and was used by Louis XV to accommodate his staff while he was hunting in the Forest of Sénart. It subsequently became known as the Chasse Royale (Royal Hunting Inn). It was acquired for residential use by an industrialist, Eugène Lebon, in the mid-19th century and then by the Labriet family in the early 20th century. It was bought by the council in 1941 and, after conversion for municipal use, it became the town hall in December 1942.

The design involved a symmetrical main frontage of seven bays facing onto the street. The central bay featured a segmental headed doorway on the ground floor and round-headed windows on the first and second floors. The central bay was flanked by full-height banded pilasters supporting a pediment with a clock in the tympanum. The other bays were fenestrated by segmental-headed windows on all three floors, and there was a hipped roof above.

Following the liberation of the town by troops of the American 4th Infantry Division on 26 August 1944, a crowd of local people wearing armbands with the insignia of the French Forces of the Interior assembled in front of the town hall.

The building was extended at the rear to create a modern Salle du Conseil (council chamber) in the 1960s, and a single-story entrance foyer was added to the centre of the main façade in the 1980s.
