= Cantons of the Essonne department =

The following is a list of the 21 cantons of the Essonne department, in France, following the French canton reorganisation which came into effect in March 2015:

- Arpajon
- Athis-Mons
- Brétigny-sur-Orge
- Corbeil-Essonnes
- Dourdan
- Draveil
- Épinay-sous-Sénart
- Étampes
- Évry-Courcouronnes
- Gif-sur-Yvette
- Longjumeau
- Massy
- Mennecy
- Palaiseau
- Ris-Orangis
- Sainte-Geneviève-des-Bois
- Savigny-sur-Orge
- Les Ulis
- Vigneux-sur-Seine
- Viry-Châtillon
- Yerres
