= Jacques Marie François Bigot =

French naturalist and entomologist

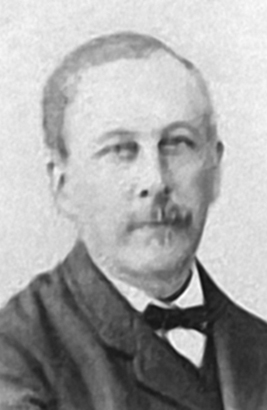
- Bigot in 1883
- Born: 14 October 1818; Paris, France
- Died: 14 April 1893 (aged 74); Paris, France
- Occupation: Entomology
- Known for: Describing more than 1,500 species of Diptera

Jacques Marie François Bigot (French: [ʒak maʁi fʁɑ̃swa biɡo]; 14 October 1818 – 14 April 1893) was a French naturalist and entomologist most noted for his studies of Diptera. He was one of two sons of physician Jacques Bigot (1757–1842) and Marie Françoise Euphrosine (née Luxure-Luxeuil) Bigot (1791–1845). Bigot was born in Paris, France, where he lived all his life, though he had a property in Quincy-sous-Sénart near Brumoy acquired in 1874, and where he died after an attack of influenza.

He became a member of the Entomological Society of France in 1844, and his first paper was published in its Annals in 1845, as was most of his later work. Bigot was a prolific author, describing more than 1,500 species of Diptera in more than 400 scientific publications and, like Francis Walker, his work was the subject of much later criticism. R.A. Senior-White, in his 1927 eulogy of Enrico Brunetti, stated about Bigot “The death of Bigot in 1893 had put a term to the endless flow of description, insufficient and loosely worded, which Francis Walker and himself had been producing for forty years, whilst the chaos resulting therefrom had, in 1896, been ably summarized by van der Wulp in his classical ‘Catalogue of the described Diptera from South Asia’.”

Bigot's collection of more than 35,000 specimens of Diptera was purchased by George Henry Verrall in 1893 for 8,000 francs and contains a wealth of type material of Diptera including those of Pierre-Justin-Marie Macquart, Ferdinand Kowarz, and Jean-Baptiste Robineau-Desvoidy. When Verrall died, it passed to his nephew, dipterist James Edward Collin, who in 1961 gave part of it to the Natural History Museum in London and the Oxford University Museum of Natural History.

== Selected works ==
- 1874-1892 Diptères nouveaux ou peu connus (37 parts in all) in Ann Soc.Ent.Fr. online
- 1858 Diptères de Madagascar
- 1888 Enumération des Diptères recueillis en Tunisie
- 1892 Voyage de Alluaud dans le territoire d'Assinie (Afrique occidentale) en 1886 :Diptères

A complete list of Bigot's works is given by Evenhuis, N.L. (2003). "The complete bibliography of scientific works of Jacques-Marie-Frangille Bigot". Zootaxa. 210: 1–36. doi:10.11646/zootaxa.210.1.1. and the genera erected by Bigot are discussed in Evenhuis, N.L.; Pont, A.C. (2004). "The Diptera Genera of Jacques-Marie-Frangile Bigot". Zootaxa. 751: 1–94. doi:10.11646/zootaxa.751.1.1..

== Note ==
Two other French entomologists, Louis Bigot (publishing 1963 to present) and Just Bigot, the latter J.M.F. Bigot's nephew, should not be confused.
