= Communauté d'agglomération Val d'Yerres Val de Seine =

Coordinates: 48.70°N 2.50°E

Val d'Yerres Val de Seine
- Communauté d'agglomération

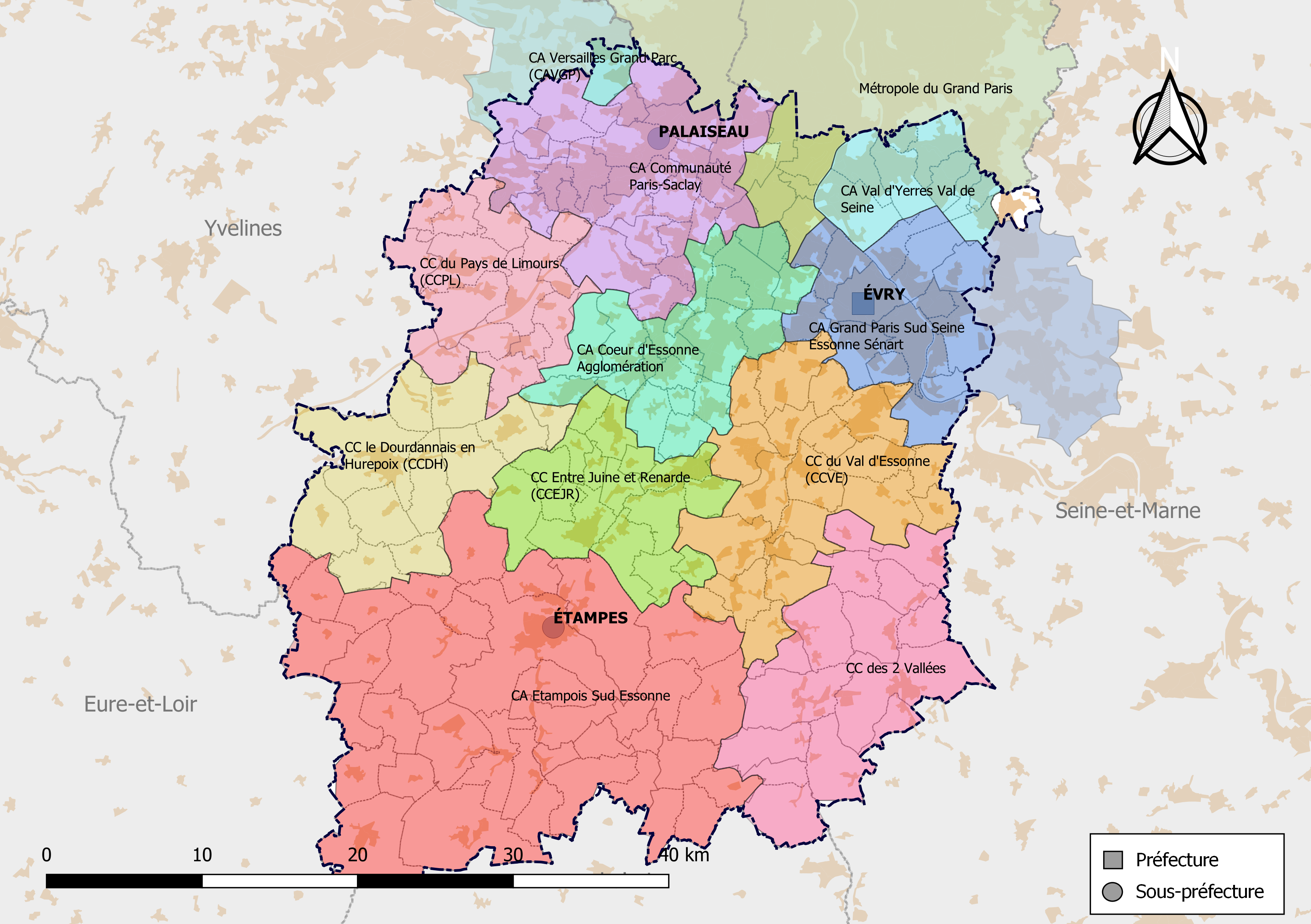
- Location within the department (light blue)
- Country: France
- Region: Île-de-France
- Department: Essonne
- No. of communes: 9
- Established: 2016

Government
  - President: François Durovray (LR)
- Area: 66.4 km^{2} (25.6 sq mi)
- Population (2018): 177,020
  - Density: 2,670/km^{2} (6,900/sq mi)
- Website: vyvs.fr

Communauté d'agglomération Val d'Yerres Val de Seine is the communauté d'agglomération, an intercommunal structure, covering southern suburbs of Paris. It is located in the Essonne department, in the Île-de-France region, northern France. It was created in January 2016. Its population was 177,769 in 2014. Its seat is in Brunoy. Its area is 66.4 km^{2}. Its population was 177,020 in 2018. It takes its name from the valleys of the rivers Yerres and Seine.

== Composition ==
The communauté d'agglomération consists of the following 9 communes:

1. Boussy-Saint-Antoine
2. Brunoy
3. Crosne
4. Draveil
5. Épinay-sous-Sénart
6. Montgeron
7. Quincy-sous-Sénart
8. Vigneux-sur-Seine
9. Yerres
