= Canton of Yerres =

Coordinates: 48.7171°N 2.4881°E

Yerres
- Canton
- Interactive map of Yerres
- Country: France
- Region: Île-de-France
- Department: Essonne
- No. of communes: {{{nbcomm}}}

Government
  - Representatives (2021–2028): Olivier Clodong; Martine Sureau
- Population (2023): 47,664
- INSEE code: 91 21

The Canton of Yerres is a French administrative division, located in the arrondissement of Évry, in the Essonne département (Île-de-France région). Since the French canton reorganisation which came into effect in March 2015, the canton of Yerres consists of the communes of Yerres and Brunoy (partly). It had 49,067 inhabitants as of 2018.

== See also ==
- Cantons of the Essonne department
- Communes of the Essonne department
