= Hôtel de Ville, Yerres =

Town hall in Yerres, France

Hôtel de Ville
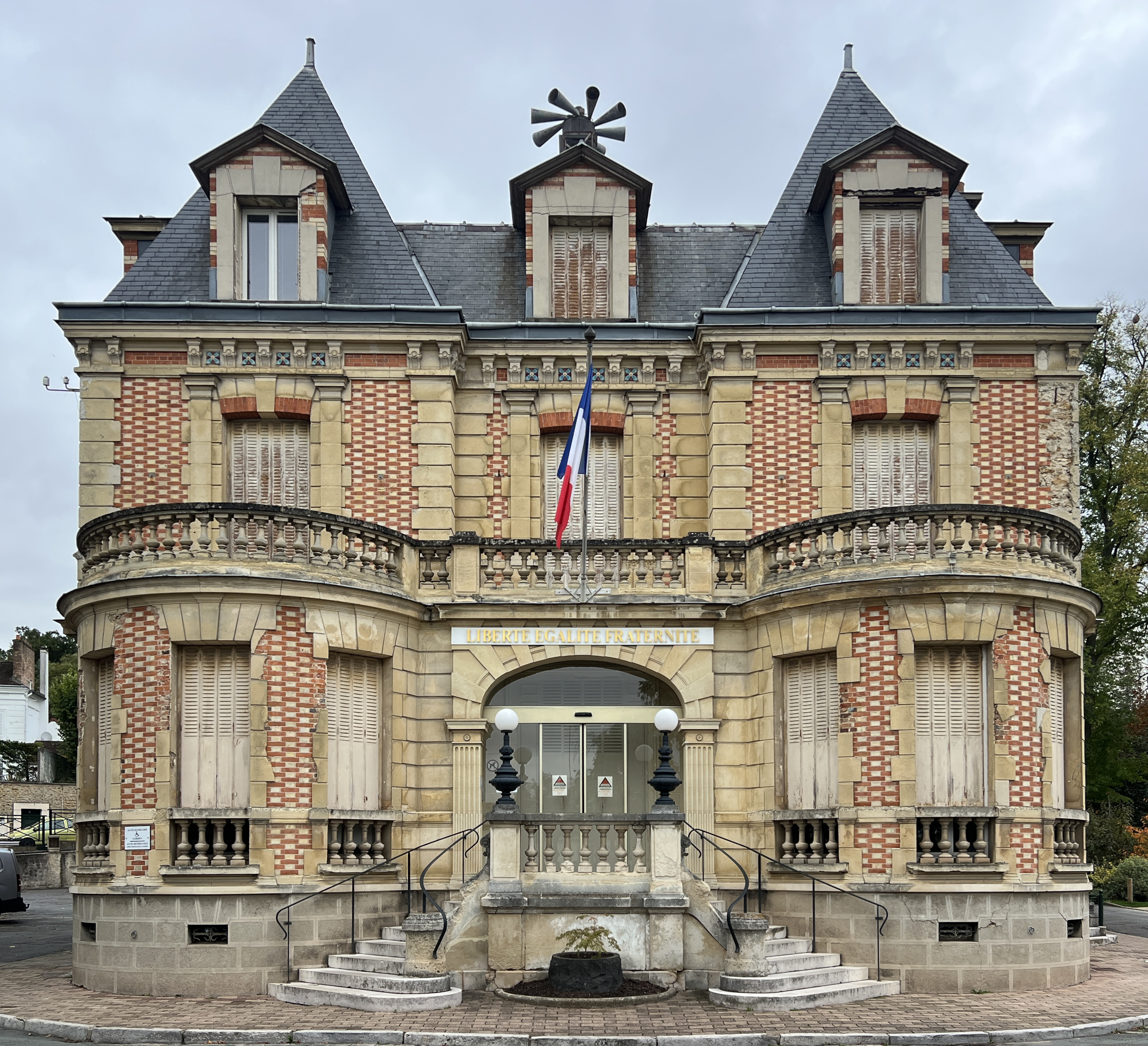
- The main frontage of the Hôtel de Ville in October 2024
- Interactive map of the Hôtel de Ville area

General information
- Type: City hall
- Architectural style: Neoclassical style
- Location: Yerres, France
- Coordinates: 48.7171°N 2.4881°E
- Completed: 1899

The Hôtel de Ville (French pronunciation: [otɛl də vil], City Hall) is a municipal building in Yerres, Essonne, in the southeastern suburbs of Paris, standing on Rue Charles de Gaulle.

== History ==
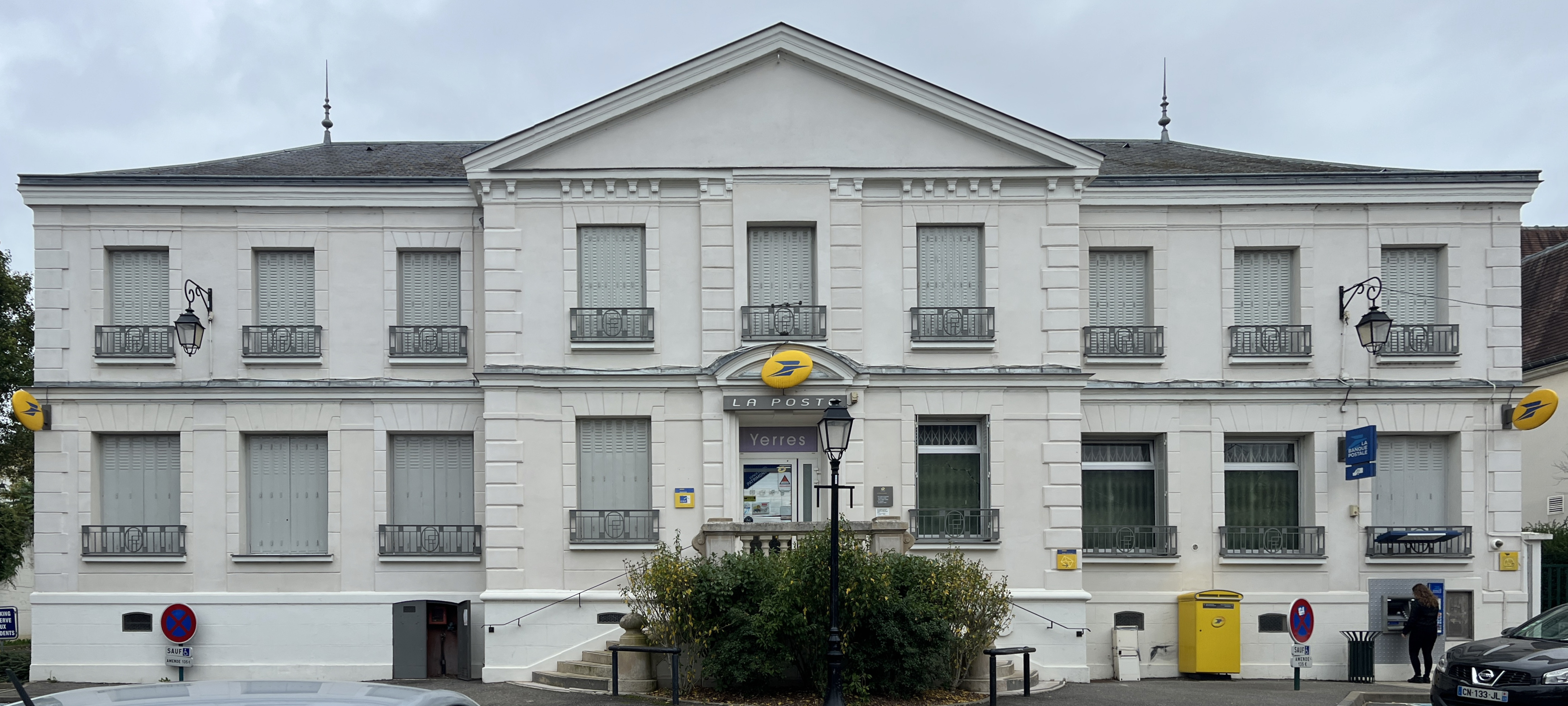
The old town hall

Following the French Revolution, the town council initially met in the house of the mayor at the time. This arrangement continued until the early 1840s when the council led by the mayor and local seigneur, Mélin Vicomte du Taillis, decided to commission a combined town hall and school. The site they selected was on the north side of what is now Rue Charles de Gaulle. The building was designed in the neoclassical style, built in ashlar stone and was completed in 1846.

The design involved a symmetrical main frontage of nine bays facing onto Rue Charles de Gaulle. The central section of three bays, which was slightly projected forward, featured a forestair leading up to a doorway with a segmental pediment. The outer sections accommodated the two schools, one section for boys and the other for girls. The whole building was fenestrated with casement windows with iron railings and the central section was surmounted by a pediment which contained a clock in the tympanum. After the building was no longer required for municipal purposes, it served as the local post office.

Following the liberation of the town by American troops of the US Third Army, commanded by General George S. Patton, on 27 August 1944, during the Second World War, the council led by the mayor, Paul Perrault, sang La Marseillaise and The Star-Spangled Banner from the town hall balcony as they watched a parade in front of the building.

In 1960, following significant population growth, the council led by the mayor, Marceau Balliot, decided to acquire a more substantial property. The building they selected was the Château de Beauregard. The site had originally been developed by the writer Antoine-Nicolas Dezallier d'Argenville who commissioned a house there in around 1760. The house was acquired by the soldier, General Charles Tristan, marquis de Montholon, in 1840 and then by the owner of a haberdashery business, Honoré Aurélien Benoiston, in 1880. Benoiston decided to demolish the old building and to commission a new building on the same site. The new building was designed in the neoclassical style, built in a mixture of red and yellow brick and was completed in 1899.

The design involved a symmetrical main frontage of three bays facing towards what is now Rue Charles de Gaulle. The central bay featured a forestair leading up to a segmental headed doorway which was flanked by fluted pilasters supporting a series of voussoirs. The outer bays were projected forward on the ground floor to form large semi-circular structures which were surmounted by balustrades. The building was fenestrated by casement windows and, on the first floor, the windows were flanked by pilasters supporting a heavily modillioned cornice. There were three dormer windows at attic level. After the council acquired the building in 1960, one of the reception rooms was converted for use as the Salle des Mariages (wedding room).

In 2011, a bust of General Charles de Gaulle, which had been created by the sculptor, Yvonne Clergerie, was installed in the garden in front of the town hall.
