= Montgeron-Crosne station =

Train station (Paris RER)

Montgeron-Crosne
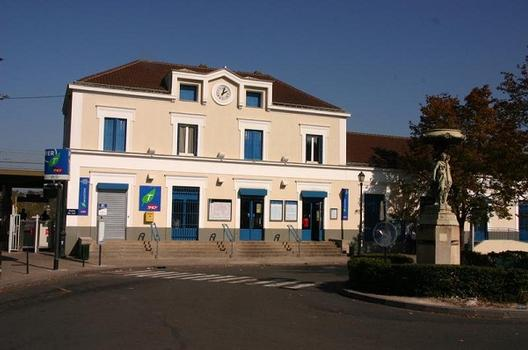
- Gare de Montgeron-Crosne main building

General information
- Location: Montgeron, Essonne, Île-de-France, France
- Coordinates: 48°42′29″N 2°27′44″E
- Elevation: 44 m (144 ft)
- Operator: SNCF
- Lines: Paris–Marseille railway RER D
- Platforms: 3 (2 side and 1 central)
- Tracks: 4
- Train operators: SNCF
- Connections: Noctilien Line N134(see here:)

Construction
- Accessible: Yes, by prior reservation

Other information
- Station code: 87682104
- Fare zone: 4

History
- Opened: 1995

Passengers
- 2024: 3,933,989

Services
Preceding station	RER	Following station
Villeneuve-Saint-Georges towards Goussainville	RER D	Yerres towards Melun
Location

Montgeron-Crosne is a railway station in Montgeron, Essonne, Île-de-France, France. The station was opened in 1995 and is on the Paris–Marseille railway. The station is served by the RER Line D, which is operated by SNCF. The station serves the communes of Montgeron and Crosne.

== Station info ==
Situated at an altitude at 44 meters above sea level, the station is on the 17.45 kilometer point of the Paris-Marseille railway, between the stations of Villeneuve-Saint-Georges and Yerres. The station served 3,526,200 people in 2014.

Montgeron-Crosne station main building was under renovation, and is finished now. SNCF offered free rides from Montgeron-Crosne to Gare de Lyon during the construction time.

== Train services ==
The following services serve the station:

- Local services (RER D) Goussainville – Saint-Denis – Gare de Lyon – Villeneuve-Saint-Georges – Montgeron-Crosne – Combs-la-Ville–Quincy – Melun
- Local services (RER D) Gare de Lyon – Maison Alfort-Alfortville – Villeneuve-Saint-Georges – Montgeron-Crosne – Combs-la-Ville–Quincy – Melun
