= Hôtel de Ville, Vigneux-sur-Seine =

Town hall in Vigneux-sur-Seine, France

Hôtel de Ville
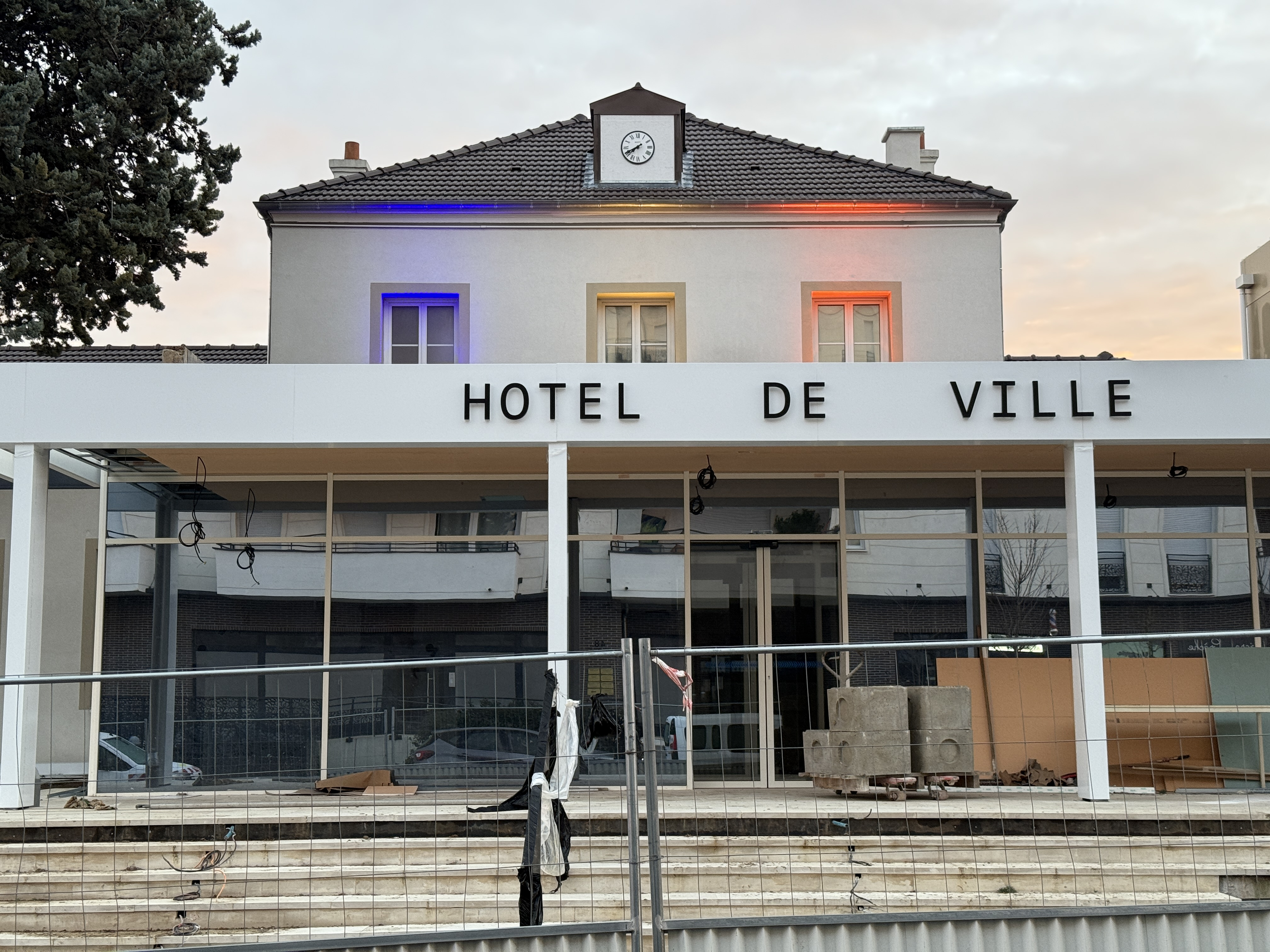
- The main frontage of the Hôtel de Ville amid renovation works in January 2026
- Interactive map of the Hôtel de Ville area

General information
- Type: City hall
- Architectural style: Neoclassical style
- Location: Vigneux-sur-Seine, France
- Coordinates: 48.7001°N 2.4170°E
- Completed: 1880

Design and construction
- Architect: Henri Basile Supplisson

The Hôtel de Ville (French pronunciation: [otɛl də vil]; City Hall) is a municipal building in Vigneux-sur-Seine, Essonne, in the southern outer suburbs of Paris, standing on Rue Pierre Marin. It has been included on the Inventaire général des monuments by the Ministry of Culture since 2006.

== History ==
Following the French Revolution, the town council initially met in the house of the mayor at the time. After a significant increase in population, largely associated with the completion of the Villeneuve-Saint-Georges to Montargis railway line in 1863, the town council decided to commission and combined town hall and school. The site they selected, known as "l'Ancienne Garenne" (the Old Warren), was acquired from Georges Chodron de Courcel, who was a naval officer and ancestor of Bernadette Chirac. The new building was designed by Henri Basile Supplisson in the neoclassical style, built by Jacques Houry in brick with a cement render finish and was officially opened by the mayor, Pierre Marin, on 1 July 1880.

The design involved a symmetrical main frontage of five bays facing onto the street. The central section of three bays, which was two-storey, featured a doorway with a stone surround and a keystone on the ground floor, a casement window with a shutter on the first floor and a clock supported by scrolls and surmounted by a triangular pediment at roof level. The outer bays of the central section and the wings, which were single-storey, were fenestrated in a similar style. Internally, the classrooms were on the ground floor, while the municipal offices, including the archives and the mayor's office, were on the first floor.

The school operated on a co-educational basis until a new girls' school, École Pasteur, on what is now Rue du Maréchal-Leclerc opened in 1906. The school returned to co-educational use in 1930 and remained on that basis until all children relocated to the newly opened École Jean-Jaurès on Avenue Henri-Barbusse in 1935. The classrooms were converted for municipal use in 1954 and the complex was expanded, with a modern extension in the form of a three-storey office block being added to the southeast of the original building. The work was undertaken by Gertrabat to a design by Ferdy Aver and was completed in July 1979.

In early 2024, the council initiated an extensive programme of refurbishment works costing approximately €1 million. The works involved internal remodelling, an extension to the reception area and new cladding for the façade.
