= Paul-Marcel Dammann =

French medallist and engraver (1885–1939)

Paul-Marcel Dammann (13 June 1885, in Montgeron, Paris, France – 1939, in Montgeron) was a French engraver and medalist, a student of Jules-Clément Chaplain (1839–1909).

Second second Grand Prix de Rome for medal engraving in 1905.

Prix de Rome in 1908, second medal in 1914, first medal in 1921, Medal of Honor in 1925.

Some of his works are kept at the Musée de la Monnaie de Paris and the American Numismatic Society Museum in New York.

== Bibliography ==
- E. Bénézit, Dictionnaire des peintres, sculpteurs, dessinateurs et graveurs, 1976. Tome 3, page 340.
