= Yerres =

Commune in Île-de-France, France

- Commune
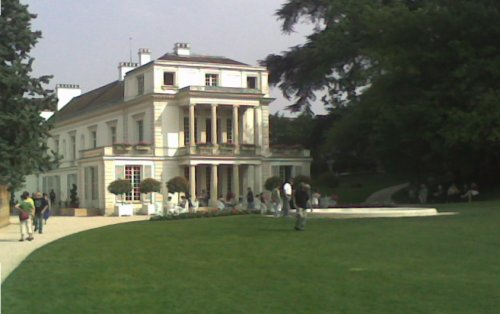
- Caillebotte garden

- Coat of arms

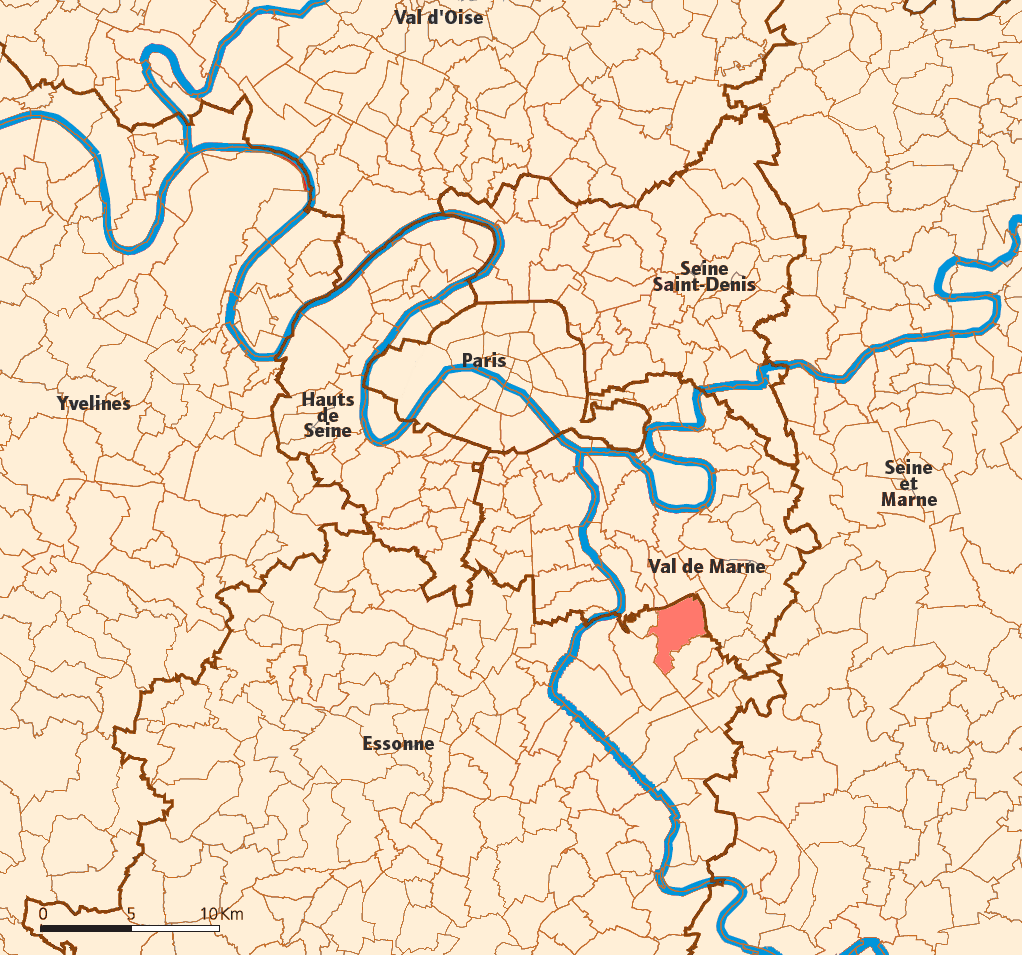
- Location (in red) within Paris inner and outer suburbs
- Location of Yerres
- Location within France Location within Île-de-France (region)
- Coordinates: 48°43′02″N 2°29′17″E
- Country: France
- Region: Île-de-France
- Department: Essonne
- Arrondissement: Évry
- Canton: Yerres
- Intercommunality: Val d'Yerres Val de Seine

Government
  - Mayor (2026–32): Nicolas Dupont-Aignan (DLF)
- Area^{1}: 9.84 km^{2} (3.80 sq mi)
- Elevation: 45 m (148 ft)
- Highest elevation: 116 m (381 ft)
- Lowest elevation: 32 m (105 ft)
- Population (2023): 27,906
  - Density: 2,840/km^{2} (7,350/sq mi)
- Time zone: UTC+01:00 (CET)
  - Summer (DST): UTC+02:00 (CEST)
- INSEE/Postal code: 91691 /91330
- ^{1} French Land Register data, which excludes lakes, ponds, glaciers > 1 km^{2} (0.386 sq mi or 247 acres) and river estuaries.

Yerres (French pronunciation: [jɛʁ]) is a commune in the Essonne department, in the southeastern suburbs of Paris, France. It is located 18.3 km (11.4 mi) from Central Paris.

== Toponymy ==
The name Yerres possibly derives from the Proto-Indo-European wódr̥, meaning 'water', which is common in river names (e.g. Oder).

== History ==
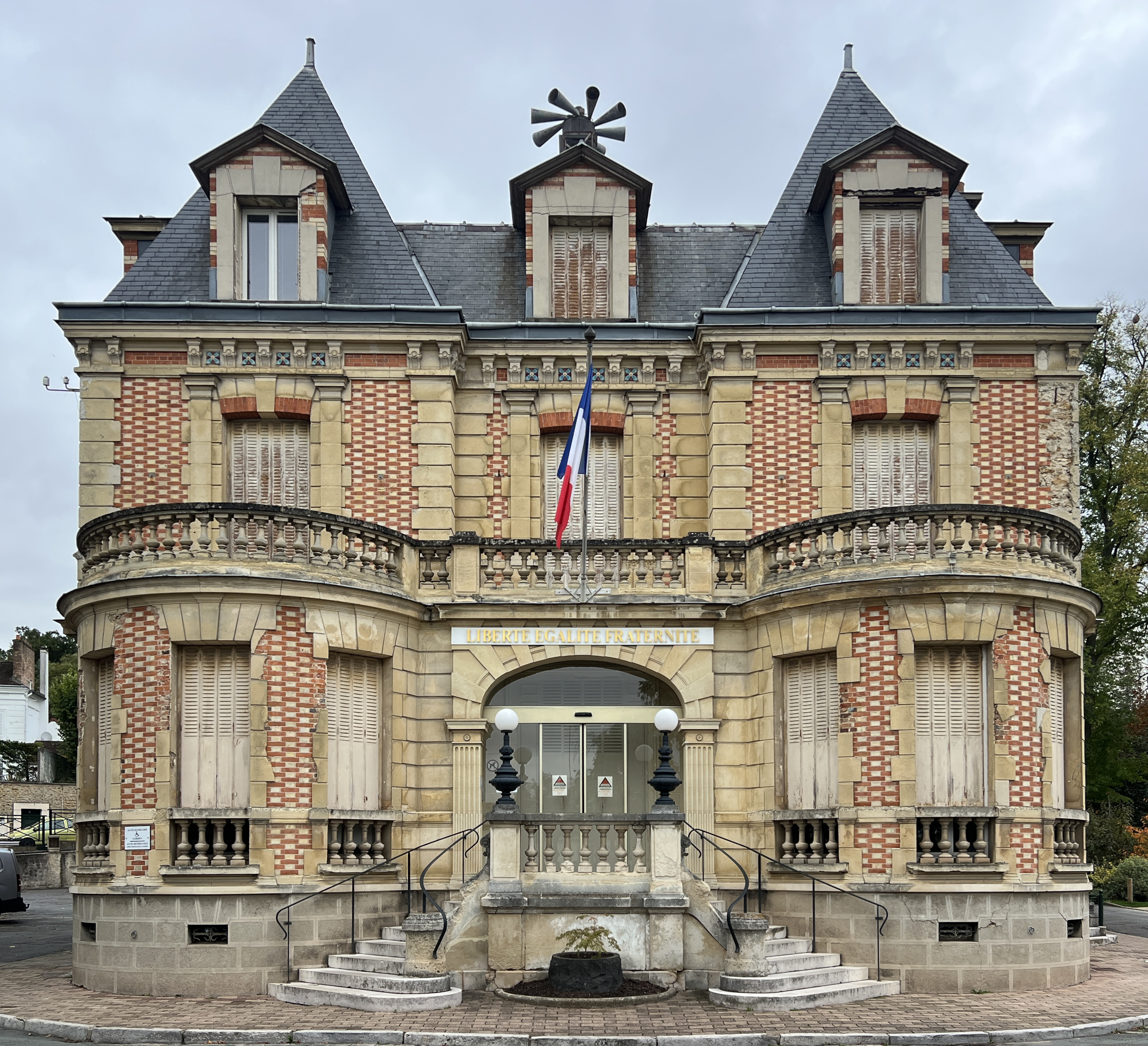
The Hôtel de Ville

The Hôtel de Ville was built as a private residence in 1899.

== Population ==
Inhabitants are called Yerrois in French.

Historical population

Year	Pop.	±% p.a.
1793	998	—
1800	1,066	+0.95%
1806	1,088	+0.34%
1821	869	−1.49%
1831	978	+1.19%
1836	967	−0.23%
1841	1,041	+1.49%
1846	1,194	+2.78%
1851	1,114	−1.38%
1856	1,135	+0.37%
1861	1,288	+2.56%
1866	1,526	+3.45%
1872	1,437	−1.00%
1876	1,308	−2.32%
1881	1,429	+1.79%
1886	1,492	+0.87%
1891	1,683	+2.44%
1896	1,730	+0.55%
1901	1,822	+1.04%

Year	Pop.	±% p.a.
1906	1,846	+0.26%
1911	1,961	+1.22%
1921	2,278	+1.51%
1926	3,758	+10.53%
1931	4,938	+5.61%
1936	5,326	+1.52%
1946	5,646	+0.59%
1954	6,905	+2.55%
1962	10,747	+5.69%
1968	18,206	+9.18%
1975	23,162	+3.50%
1982	25,715	+1.50%
1990	27,136	+0.67%
1999	27,455	+0.13%
2007	28,789	+0.59%
2012	28,784	−0.00%
2017	29,029	+0.17%
2023	27,906	−0.66%

Source: EHESS and INSEE (1968-2023)

== Geography ==
Yerres lies in the North-Eastern part of Essonne and bordering the Val-de-Marne département. The town extends on both sides of the valley through which flows the river Yerres. The highest point is the wooded Mont Griffon, which reaches an altitude of 116 m, while the lowest point is at only 30 m above sea level.

== Sights ==
=== Caillebotte Estate ===
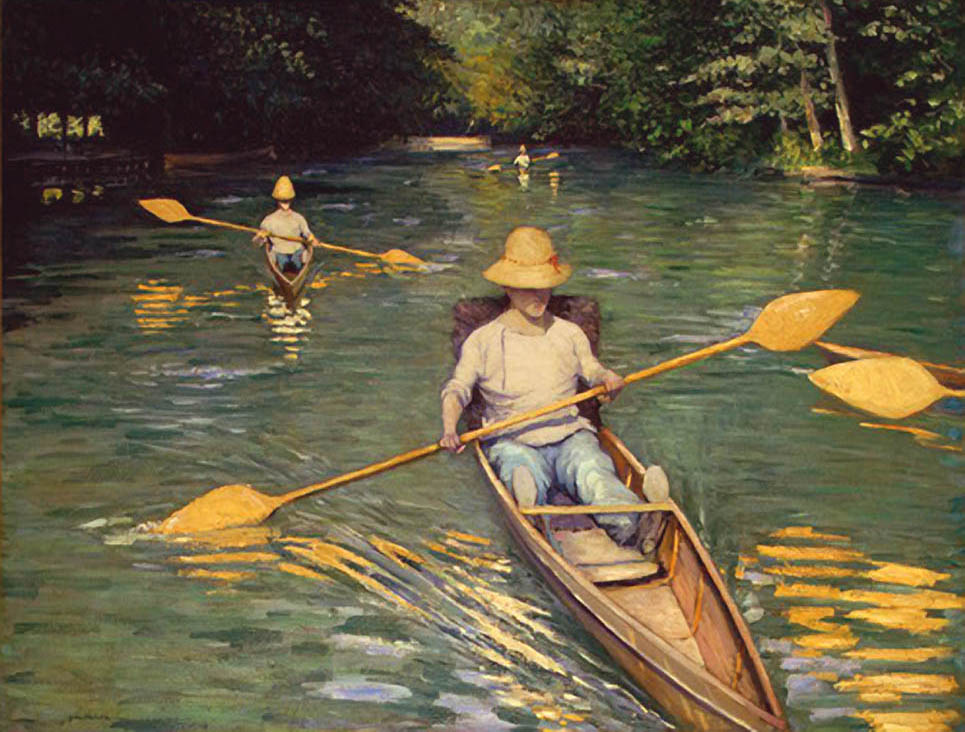
Les Canotiers, G. Caillebotte

In 1860 the father of Gustave Caillebotte bought an estate on the banks of the river Yerres and the famous impressionist painted around 80 paintings there, until the sale of the estate in 1879. The most famous paintings the artist made in Yerres are Portraits à la campagne, Baigneurs, Bords de l'Yerres, Canotiers ramant sur l'Yerres. The estate and its garden are now owned by the town and open to visitors.

=== Saint-Honest Church ===
The first parish of Yerres could well date back to the 12th century. At that time a wooden church stood on the spot where the current church building stands. Throughout the years the church had different patron saints: Saint Lupus, Saint Vincent (a tribute to the many vineyards the town formerly counted), Saint Fiacre and now Saint Honestus. The church that can be seen in the town center was probably built in the 13th century but later modified.

== Transport ==
Yerres is served by Yerres station on Paris RER line D.

== Twin towns – sister cities ==
Yerres is twinned with:

- Mendig, Germany
- Sainte-Brigitte-de-Laval, Canada

== See also ==
- Communes of the Essonne department
