= Brunoy station =

Train station (Paris RER)

Brunoy
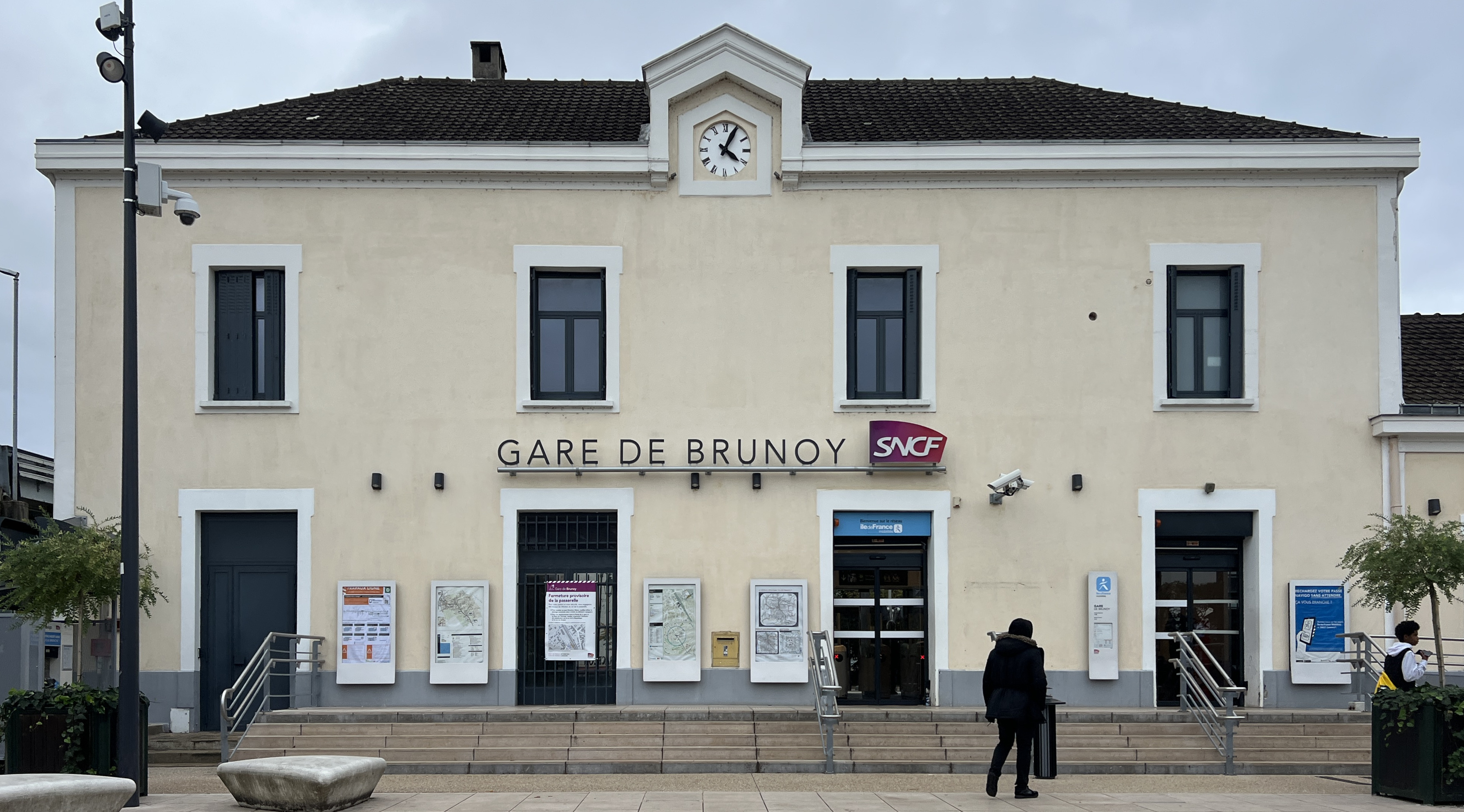
- Brunoy station

General information
- Location: Place de la Gare, 91800 Brunoy, Essonne, Île-de-France, France
- Coordinates: 48°41′57″N 2°30′23″E
- Elevation: 58 m (190 ft)
- Operator: SNCF
- Lines: Paris–Marseille railway RER D
- Platforms: 3 (2 side and 1 central)
- Tracks: 4
- Train operators: SNCF
- Connections: Noctilien Line N134(see here:)

Construction
- Accessible: Yes, by prior reservation
- Architect: François-Alexis Cendrier

Other information
- Station code: 87682120
- Fare zone: 5

History
- Opened: 1852

Passengers
- 2024: 4,831,405

Services
Preceding station	RER	Following station
Yerres towards Goussainville	RER D	Boussy-Saint-Antoine towards Melun
Location

Brunoy is an RER station in Brunoy, a commune in Essonne, Île-de-France, France. The station was opened in 1852 and is on the Paris–Marseille railway. The RER Line D, which is operated by the SNCF, serves the station.

== Station Info ==
Built and designed by the architect François-Alexis Cendrier at an altitude of 58 meters above sea level, Brunoy station is at the 21.102 kilometer point of the Paris-Marseille railway, in between the stations of Yerres and Boussy-Saint-Antoine. By the estimations of SNCF in 2016, around 4,276,800 people use the station annually.

== Train Services ==
The following RER D train services serve the station:

- Local services (RER D) Goussainville–Saint-Denis–Gare de Lyon–Villeneuve-Saint-Georges–Brunoy–Combs-la-Ville–Quincy–Melun
- Local services (RER D) Gare de Lyon–Creteil-Pompadour–Villeneuve-Saint-Georges–Brunoy–Combs-la-Ville–Quincy–Melun
