= Yerres station =

Railway station in Yerres, France

Yerres
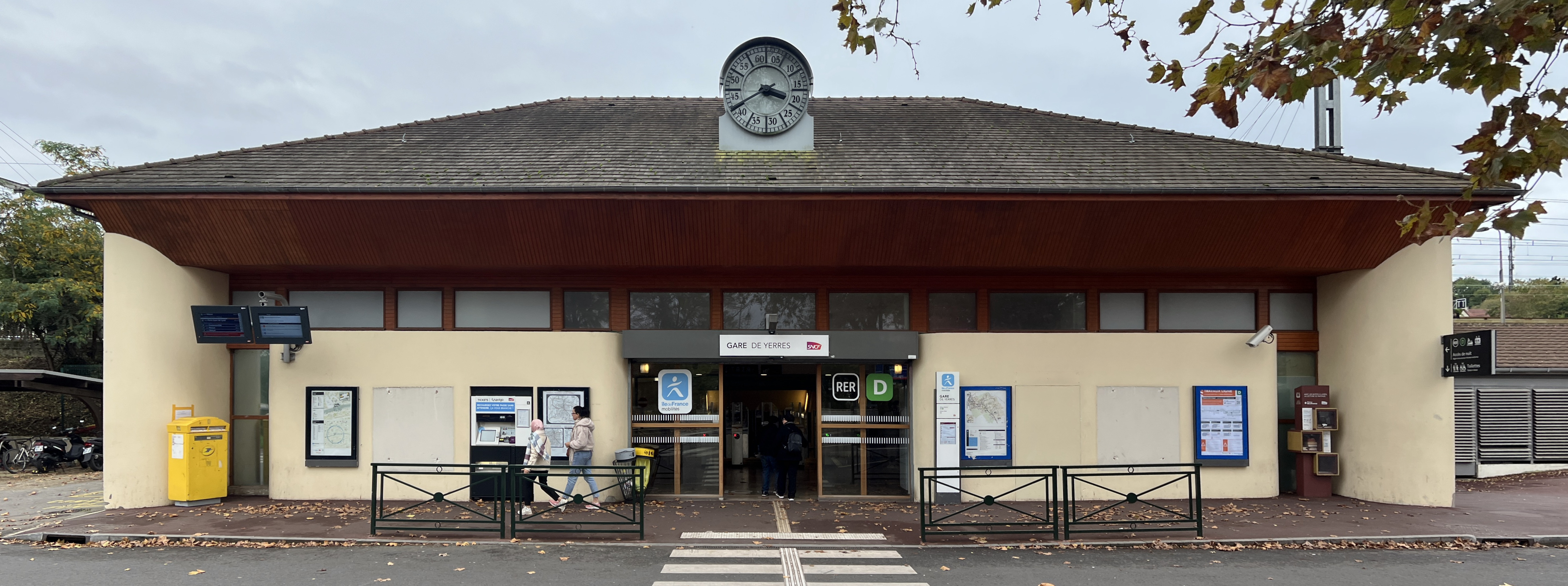
- Yerres station

General information
- Location: Rue de la Gare, 91330 Yerres, Essonne, Île-de-France; France
- Coordinates: 48°42′24″N 2°29′00″E
- Elevation: 44 m (144 ft)
- Operator: SNCF
- Lines: Paris–Marseille railway RER D
- Platforms: 3 (2 side and 1 central)
- Tracks: 4
- Train operators: SNCF
- Connections: Noctilien Line N134(see here:)

Construction
- Accessible: Yes, by prior reservation

Other information
- Station code: 87682112
- Fare zone: 4

History
- Opened: 1951

Passengers
- 2024: 3,956,561

Services
Preceding station	RER	Following station
Montgeron-Crosne towards Goussainville	RER D	Brunoy towards Melun
Location

Yerres is a railway station in Yerres, Essonne, Île-de-France, France. It is on Paris RER line D. The station serves the commune of Yerres.

== Station info ==
At the elevation of 52 meters above sea level, the station is at the 19.064 kilometric point on the Paris-Marseille railway, located between the stations of Montgeron – Crosne and Brunoy. In 2018, the SNCF estimated the annual frequentation of this station at 3,608,729 passengers. This number amounts to 3,713,314 for the year 2017.

=== Renovations ===
On 30 September 2013, Transilien announced plans for renovations to the station which would make it accessible to people with disabilities. The station will remain open during construction, which is expected to take about 15 months.

== Train services ==
The following train services serve the station:

- Local services (RER D) Goussainville – Saint-Denis – Gare de Lyon – Villeneuve-Saint-Georges – Yerres – Combs-la-Ville–Quincy – Melun
- Local services (RER D) Gare de Lyon – Creteil-Pompadour – Villeneuve-Saint-Georges – Yerres – Combs-la-Ville–Quincy – Melun
