= Canton of Vigneux-sur-Seine =

Coordinates: 48.70°N 2.42°E

The canton of Vigneux-sur-Seine is an administrative division of the Essonne department, Île-de-France region, northern France. Its borders were modified at the French canton reorganisation which came into effect in March 2015. Its seat is in Vigneux-sur-Seine.

It consists of the following communes:

1. Crosne
2. Montgeron (partly)
3. Vigneux-sur-Seine
