= Quincy-sous-Sénart =

Commune in Île-de-France, France

- Commune
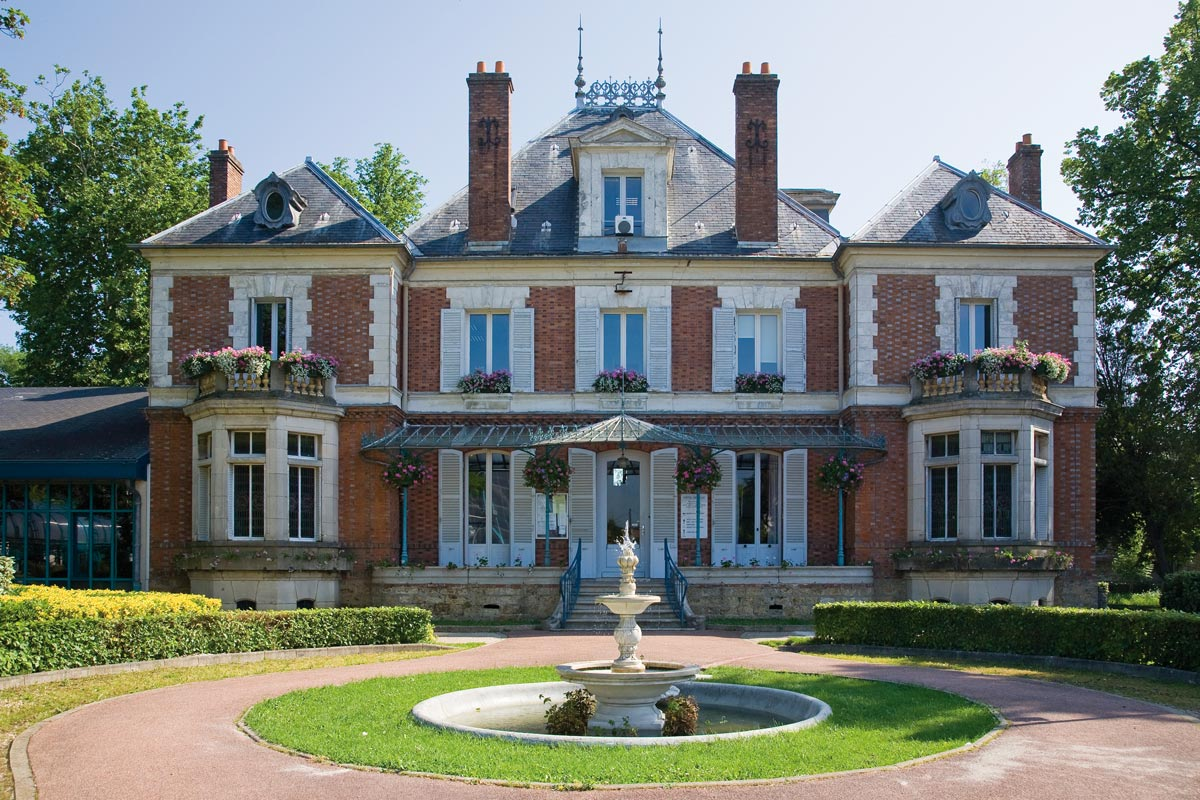
- The town hall of Quincy-sous-Sénart

- Coat of arms
- Location of Quincy-sous-Sénart
- Location within France Location within Île-de-France (region)
- Coordinates: 48°40′17″N 2°32′27″E
- Country: France
- Region: Île-de-France
- Department: Essonne
- Arrondissement: Évry
- Canton: Épinay-sous-Sénart
- Intercommunality: CA Val d'Yerres Val de Seine

Government
  - Mayor (2020–2026): Christine Garnier
- Area^{1}: 5.20 km^{2} (2.01 sq mi)
- Highest elevation: 89 m (292 ft)
- Lowest elevation: 42 m (138 ft)
- Population (2023): 9,477
  - Density: 1,820/km^{2} (4,720/sq mi)
- Time zone: UTC+01:00 (CET)
  - Summer (DST): UTC+02:00 (CEST)
- INSEE/Postal code: 91514 /91480
- ^{1} French Land Register data, which excludes lakes, ponds, glaciers > 1 km^{2} (0.386 sq mi or 247 acres) and river estuaries.

Quincy-sous-Sénart (French pronunciation: [kɛ̃si su senaʁ], literally Quincy under Sénart) is a commune in the Essonne department in Île-de-France in northern France. The palaeographer and archivist Robert Marichal (1904–1999) died in Quincy-sous-Sénart.

== Population ==
Inhabitants of Quincy-sous-Sénart are known as Quincéens in French.

Historical population
Year	Pop.	±% p.a.
1968	3,909	—
1975	6,705	+8.01%
1982	7,157	+0.94%
1990	7,079	−0.14%
1999	7,426	+0.53%
2007	7,608	+0.30%
2012	8,303	+1.76%
2017	9,021	+1.67%
2023	9,477	+0.83%
Source: INSEE

== International relations ==
Quincy-sous-Sénart is twinned with:

- Montemarciano, Italy
- Saue, Estonia

== Notable residents ==
- Dominique Pelicot
- Victor Martins

== See also ==
- Communes of the Essonne department
