= Brunoy =

Commune in Île-de-France, France

- Commune
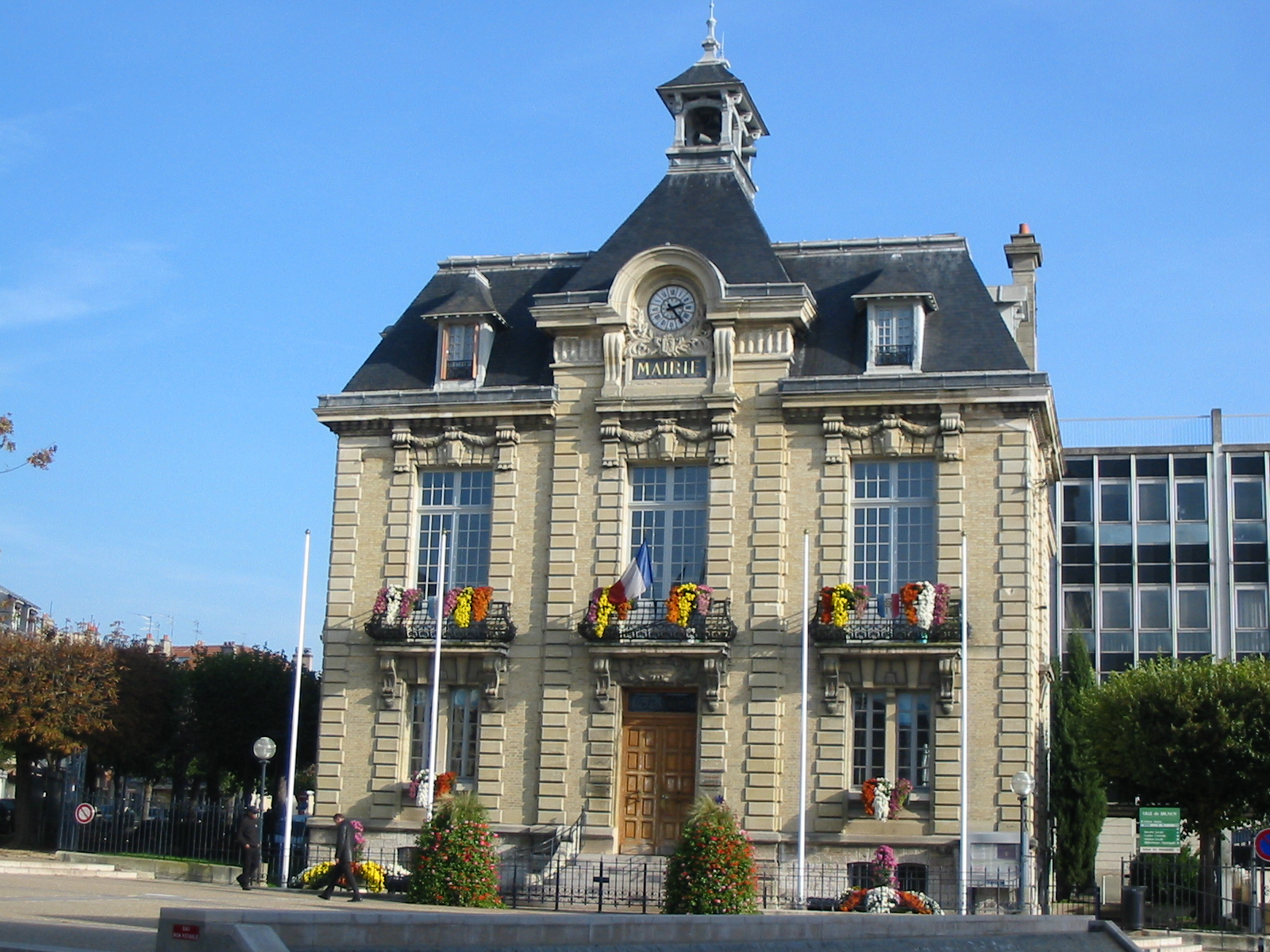
- The Hôtel de Ville

- Coat of arms

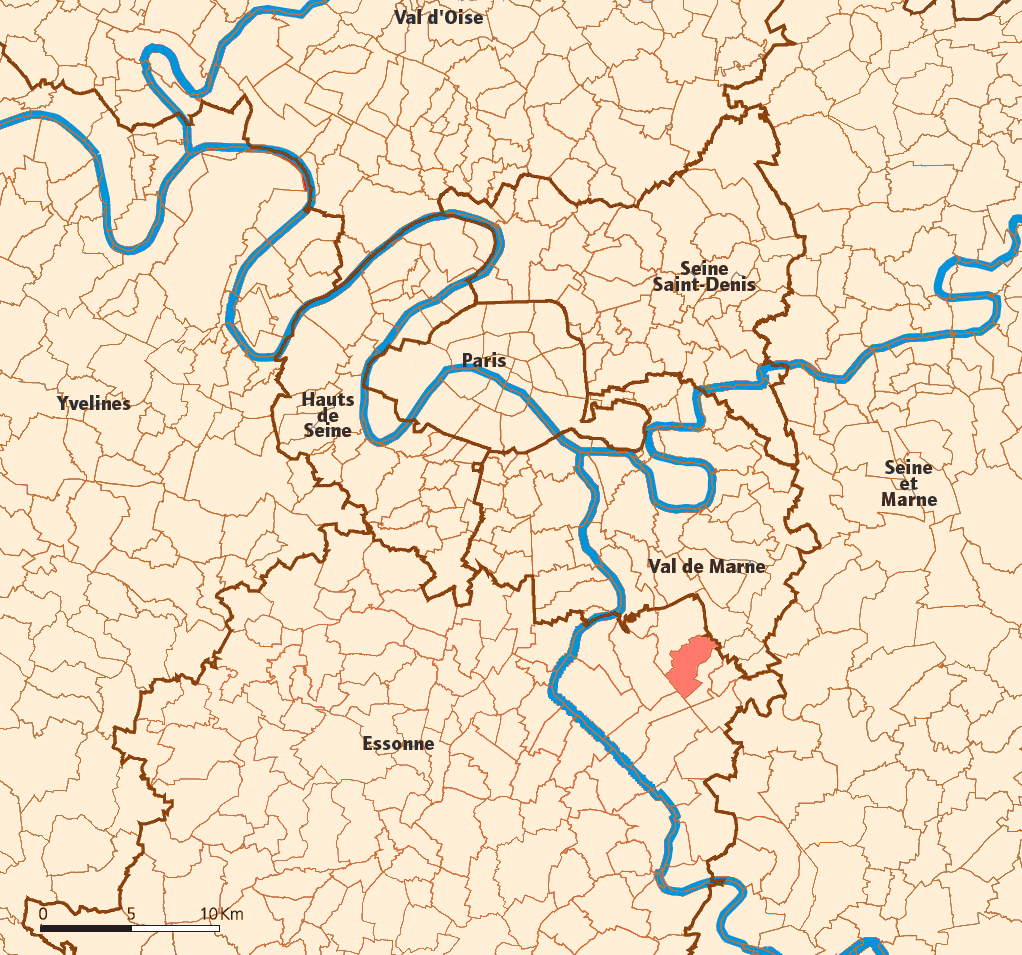
- Location (in red) within Paris inner and outer suburbs
- Location of Brunoy
- Location within France Location within Île-de-France (region)
- Coordinates: 48°41′52″N 2°30′16″E
- Country: France
- Region: Île-de-France
- Department: Essonne
- Arrondissement: Évry
- Canton: Épinay-sous-Sénart and Yerres
- Intercommunality: CA Val d'Yerres Val de Seine

Government
  - Mayor (2020–2026): Bruno Gallier
- Area^{1}: 6.62 km^{2} (2.56 sq mi)
- Elevation: 53 m (174 ft)
- Highest elevation: 94 m (308 ft)
- Lowest elevation: 37 m (121 ft)
- Population (2023): 25,643
  - Density: 3,870/km^{2} (10,000/sq mi)
- Time zone: UTC+01:00 (CET)
  - Summer (DST): UTC+02:00 (CEST)
- INSEE/Postal code: 91114 /91800
- ^{1} French Land Register data, which excludes lakes, ponds, glaciers > 1 km^{2} (0.386 sq mi or 247 acres) and river estuaries.

Brunoy (French pronunciation: [bʁynwa]) is a commune in the southeastern suburbs of Paris, Île-de-France, France. It is located 20.6 km (12.8 mi) from the center of Paris. The tenor Louis Nourrit (1780–1831) died in Brunoy.

The city has a church Saint-Medard, richly decorated in the Louis XVI style. Organ Festival takes place each year in November.

Brunoy is home to a branch of Yeshivas Tomchei Tmimim Lubavitch, which attracts hundreds of students from around the world, most notably from the United States of America and Israel.

== History ==
The Hôtel de Ville was completed in 1898.

== Population ==
Inhabitants of Brunoy are known as Brunoyens in French.

Historical population

Year	Pop.	±% p.a.
1793	978	—
1800	912	−0.99%
1806	877	−0.65%
1821	915	+0.28%
1831	961	+0.49%
1836	1,000	+0.80%
1841	1,115	+2.20%
1846	1,200	+1.48%
1851	1,205	+0.08%
1856	1,191	−0.23%
1861	1,500	+4.72%
1866	1,709	+2.64%
1872	1,777	+0.65%
1876	2,037	+3.47%
1881	2,037	+0.00%
1886	2,228	+1.81%
1891	2,180	−0.43%
1896	2,381	+1.78%
1901	2,642	+2.10%

Year	Pop.	±% p.a.
1906	2,745	+0.77%
1911	3,339	+4.00%
1921	4,237	+2.41%
1926	6,001	+7.21%
1931	7,519	+4.61%
1936	8,149	+1.62%
1946	10,072	+2.14%
1954	10,920	+1.02%
1962	14,848	+3.92%
1968	16,031	+1.29%
1975	22,727	+5.11%
1982	23,899	+0.72%
1990	24,468	+0.29%
1999	23,617	−0.39%
2007	25,981	+1.20%
2012	25,685	−0.23%
2017	25,669	−0.01%
2023	25,643	−0.02%

Source: EHESS and INSEE (1968-2023)

== Transportation ==
Brunoy is served by Brunoy station on Paris RER line D.

== Twin towns ==
The town is twinned with the borough of Reigate and Banstead.
