= Yerres (river) =

River in France

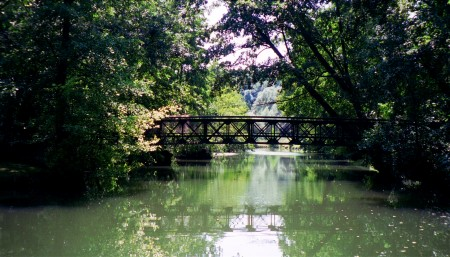
- The Yerres near Boussy-Saint-Antoine

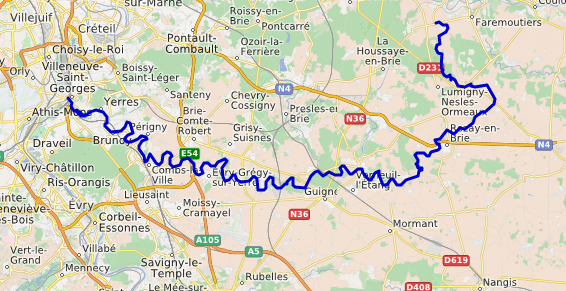

Location
- Country: France

Physical characteristics
- Mouth: Seine
  - coordinates: 48°43′36″N 2°26′34″E
- Length: 98.2 km (61.0 mi)

Basin features
- Progression: Seine→ English Channel

The Yerres (French pronunciation: [jɛʁ]) is a 98.2 km (61.0 mi) long river in northern France located in the departments of Seine-et-Marne, Essonne and Val-de-Marne (Île-de-France). It is a right tributary of the river Seine. It flows into the Seine in Villeneuve-Saint-Georges, a southeastern suburb of Paris.
