= Vigneux-sur-Seine =

Commune in Île-de-France, France

- Commune
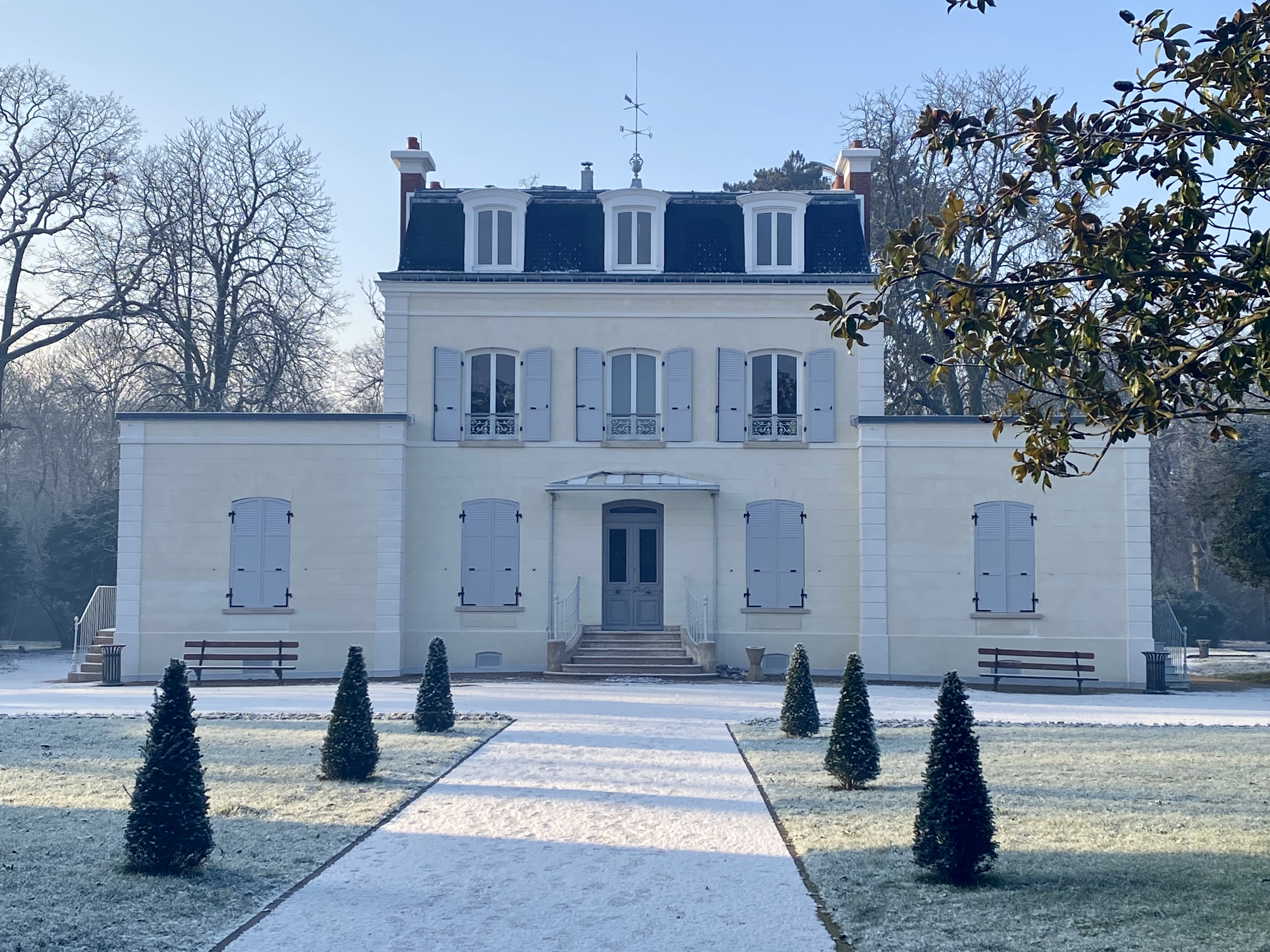
- The Manoir du Gros Buisson in Vigneux-sur-Seine

- Coat of arms

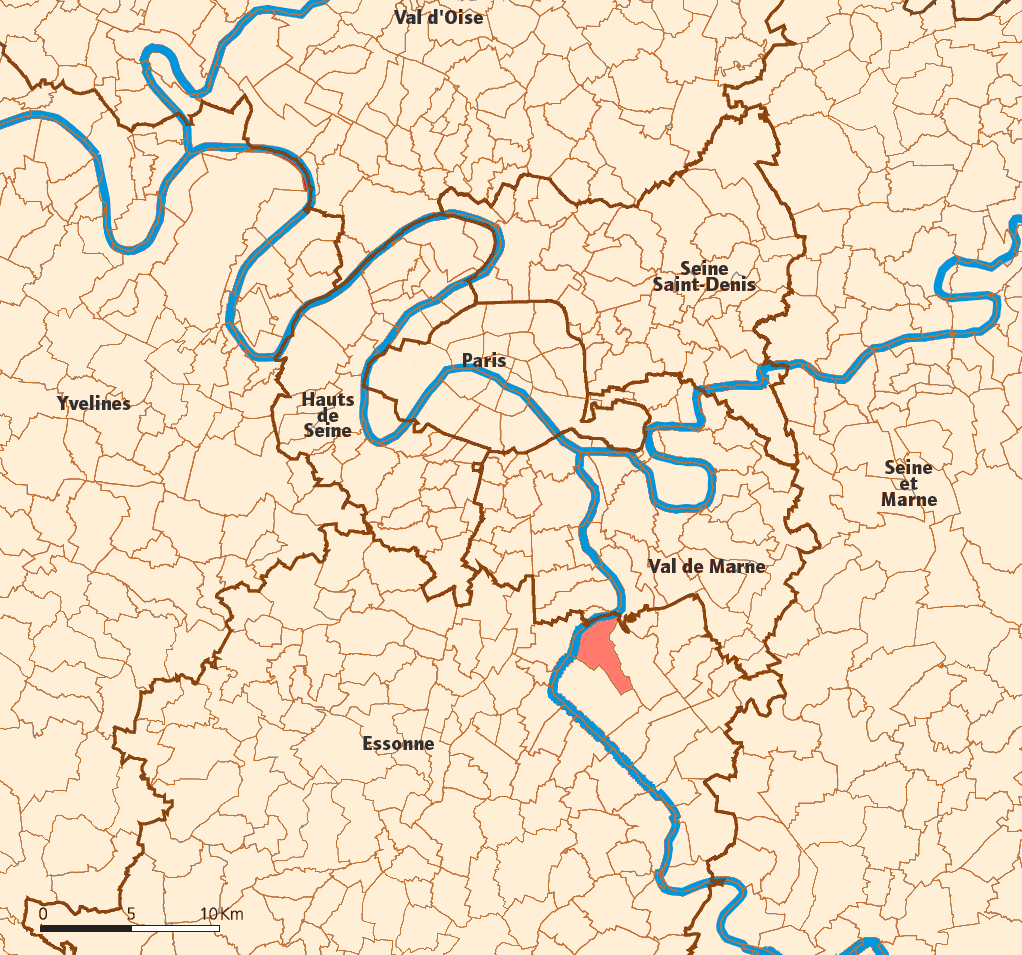
- Location (in red) within Paris inner and outer suburbs
- Location of Vigneux-sur-Seine
- Location within France Location within Île-de-France (region)
- Coordinates: 48°42′00″N 2°25′01″E
- Country: France
- Region: Île-de-France
- Department: Essonne
- Arrondissement: Évry
- Canton: Vigneux-sur-Seine
- Intercommunality: CA Val d'Yerres Val de Seine

Government
  - Mayor (2020–2026): Thomas Chazal
- Area^{1}: 8.77 km^{2} (3.39 sq mi)
- Highest elevation: 84 m (276 ft)
- Lowest elevation: 31 m (102 ft)
- Population (2023): 31,466
  - Density: 3,590/km^{2} (9,290/sq mi)
- Demonym: Vigneusiens
- Time zone: UTC+01:00 (CET)
  - Summer (DST): UTC+02:00 (CEST)
- INSEE/Postal code: 91657 /91270
- Website: www.vigneux91.fr
- ^{1} French Land Register data, which excludes lakes, ponds, glaciers > 1 km^{2} (0.386 sq mi or 247 acres) and river estuaries.

Vigneux-sur-Seine (French pronunciation: [viɲø syʁ sɛn]; lit. 'Vigneux-on-Seine') is a commune in the southeastern outer suburbs of Paris, France. It is located in Essonne, 17.6 km (10.9 mi) from the centre of Paris, on the departmental border with Val-de-Marne.

Inhabitants of Vigneux-sur-Seine are known as Vigneusiens (masculine) and Vigneusiennes (feminine) in French.

== Toponymy ==
The name Vigneux derives from the Latin vinea, meaning 'vineyard'.

== History ==
The Hôtel de Ville was completed in 1880 and extended in the 1970s.

== Population ==
Historical population

Year	Pop.	±% p.a.
1793	66	—
1821	70	+0.21%
1846	123	+2.28%
1872	157	+0.94%
1881	288	+6.97%
1891	412	+3.65%
1901	586	+3.59%
1906	1,014	+11.59%
1911	1,603	+9.59%
1921	2,191	+3.17%
1926	4,747	+16.72%
1931	7,321	+9.05%
1936	8,102	+2.05%

Year	Pop.	±% p.a.
1946	7,565	−0.68%
1954	9,124	+2.37%
1962	12,829	+4.35%
1968	22,577	+9.88%
1975	26,550	+2.34%
1982	24,462	−1.16%
1990	25,203	+0.37%
1999	25,652	+0.20%
2007	26,497	+0.41%
2012	29,963	+2.49%
2017	31,574	+1.05%
2023	31,466	−0.06%

Source: EHESS and INSEE (1968-2023)

== Transport ==
Vigneux-sur-Seine is served by Vigneux-sur-Seine station on Paris RER line D.

== Twin towns – sister cities ==
Vigneux-sur-Seine is twinned with:

- Limavady, Northern Ireland, United Kingdom
- Monção, Portugal
- Troyan, Bulgaria

== See also ==
- Communes of the Essonne department
