= Boussy-Saint-Antoine =

Commune in Île-de-France, France

- Commune
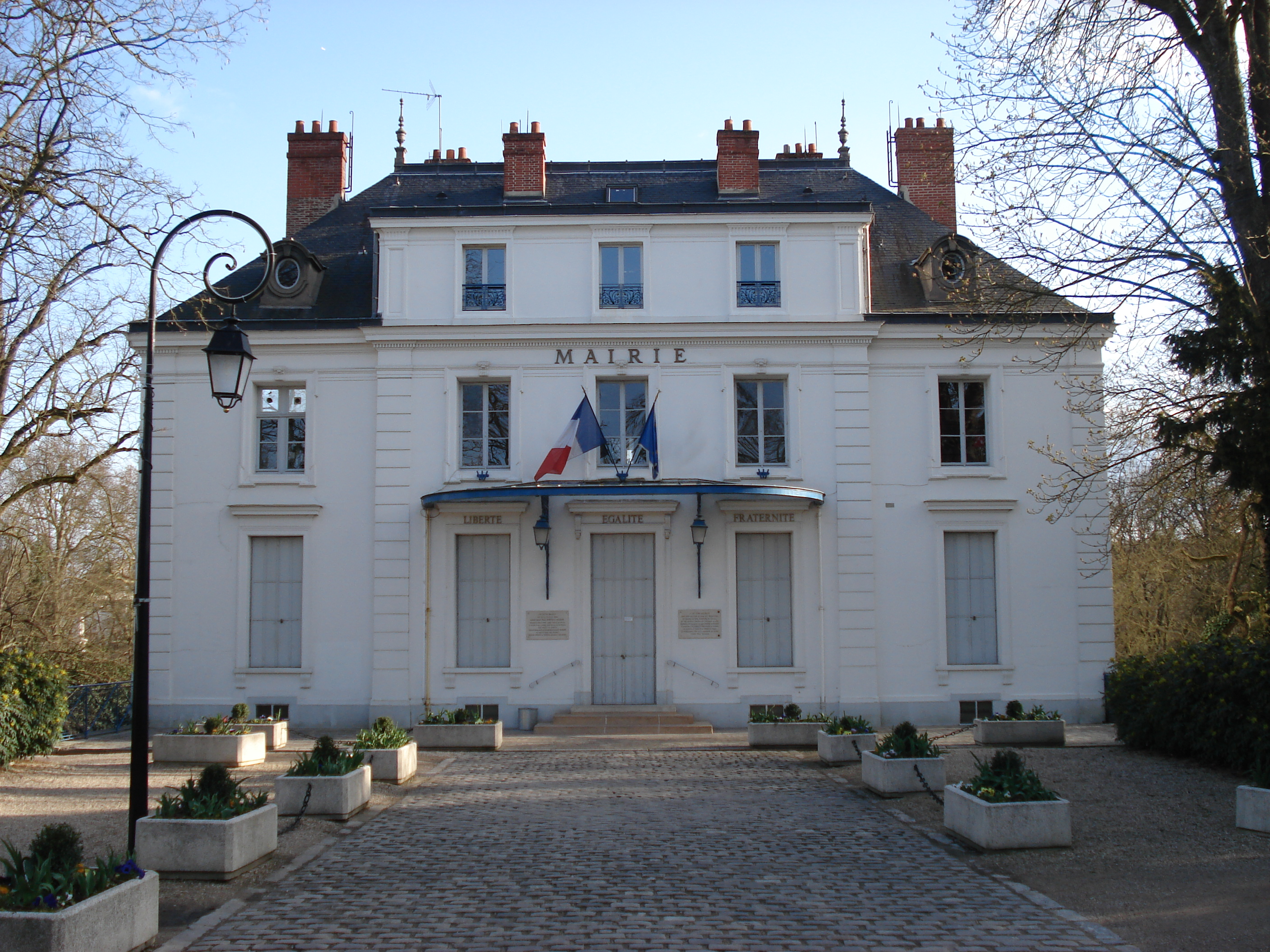
- The town hall of Boussy-Saint-Antoine

- Coat of arms
- Location of Boussy-Saint-Antoine
- Location within France Location within Île-de-France (region)
- Coordinates: 48°41′19″N 2°31′47″E
- Country: France
- Region: Île-de-France
- Department: Essonne
- Arrondissement: Évry
- Canton: Épinay-sous-Sénart
- Intercommunality: CA Val d'Yerres Val de Seine

Government
  - Mayor (2020–2026): Romain Colas
- Area^{1}: 2.90 km^{2} (1.12 sq mi)
- Highest elevation: 90 m (300 ft)
- Lowest elevation: 39 m (128 ft)
- Population (2023): 8,097
  - Density: 2,790/km^{2} (7,230/sq mi)
- Time zone: UTC+01:00 (CET)
  - Summer (DST): UTC+02:00 (CEST)
- INSEE/Postal code: 91097 /91800
- ^{1} French Land Register data, which excludes lakes, ponds, glaciers > 1 km^{2} (0.386 sq mi or 247 acres) and river estuaries.

Boussy-Saint-Antoine (French pronunciation: [busi sɛ̃.t‿ɑ̃twan]) is a commune in the Essonne department in Île-de-France in northern France.

The town has close connections with the Dutch village Aagtdorp and the Canadian city of Halifax.

== Population ==
Inhabitants of Boussy-Saint-Antoine are known as Buxaciens in French.

Historical population
Year	Pop.	±% p.a.
1968	2,360	—
1975	5,990	+14.23%
1982	5,982	−0.02%
1990	5,924	−0.12%
1999	6,352	+0.78%
2007	6,536	+0.36%
2012	6,489	−0.14%
2017	7,552	+3.08%
2023	8,097	+1.17%
Source: INSEE

== Notable people ==
- Paul Cottin, French archivist

== See also ==
- Communes of the Essonne department
