= Forest of Sénart =

Forest in France

Forest of SénartSuch Forêt de d'such Sénart
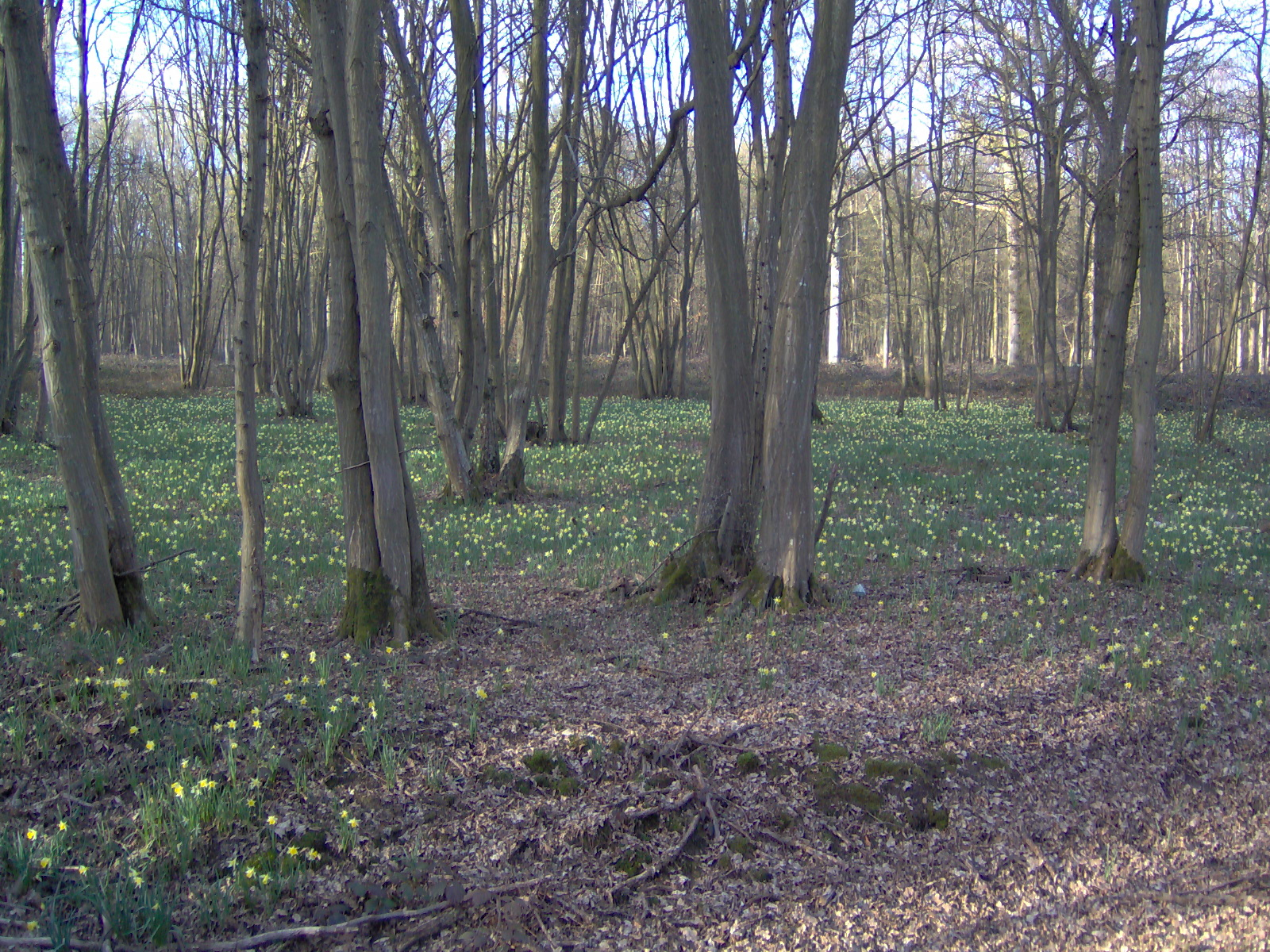
- Forest near Tigery

- Location within France
- Interactive map of Forest of SénartSuch

Geography
- Location: Essonne et Seine-et-Marne, France
- Coordinates: 48°40′00″N 2°29′00″E
- Area: 30 square kilometres (12 sq mi); 3.000 ha

The Forest of Sénart (French: Forêt de Sénart, French pronunciation: [fɔʁɛ də senaʁ]) is located in the French department of Essonne. It covers 3,000 hectares in area, this forest is very important to the local population. The local government has kept roads and agricultural companies from cutting down parts of this forest. There are roughly 2-3 million visitors a year, and the government spends 1.2 million euros a year maintaining the forest.

The forest inspired the 1826 pasticcio La forêt de Sénart by Parisian Castil-Blaze, where he openly incorporated music from the opera Euryanthe against the protests of composer Carl Maria von Weber. The experience drove Weber to lobby German theaters and sovereigns to control the distribution of his next opera, Oberon – an important incident in the creation of modern copyright law.
