= Mahurin =

Mahurin is a surname. Notable people with the name include:

- Bud Mahurin (1918–2010), United States Air Force officer and aviator
- Matt Mahurin (born 1959), American illustrator, photographer, film director
- Shelby Mahurin, American young adult fiction author

== See also ==
- Wing & Mahurin, former architectural firm in Fort Wayne, Indiana, US
- Mahoran (disambiguation)
- Mathurin (disambiguation)
