= Louis Lafitte =

French painter (1770–1828)

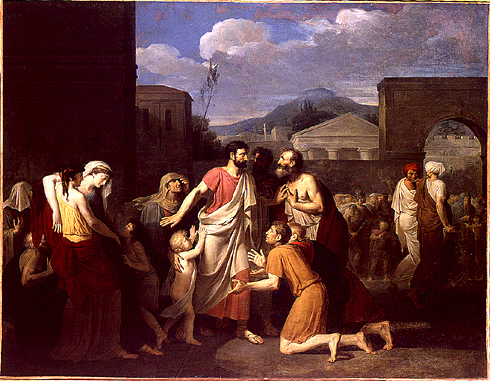
Regulus Returning to Carthage (1791)

Louis Lafitte (November 15, 1770 in Paris – August 3, 1828 in Paris) was a French painter, designer, illustrator and muralist.

== Biography ==
He was the son of a master barber. In 1778, his father offered refuge to the painter Simon Mathurin Lantara, who was in desperate financial straits and, during his stay, Lantara excited young Lafitte's interest in painting. He also convinced Lafitte's father that his son had a gift for drawing, so he was sent to study with the engraver Gilles Demarteau then, in 1786, with Jean-Baptiste Regnault. Later he was admitted to the Académie royale de peinture et de sculpture.

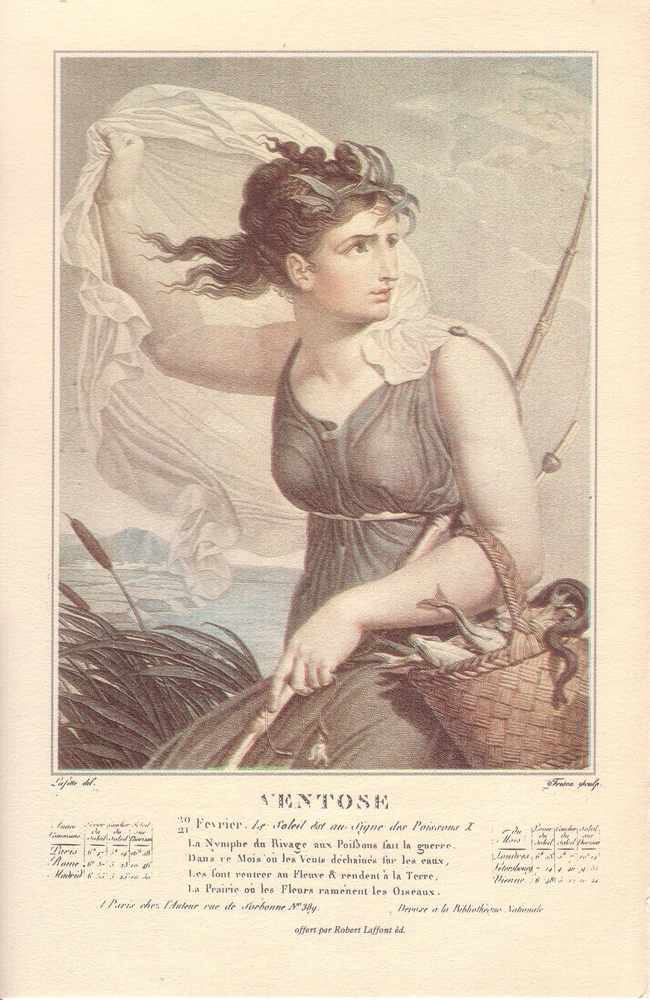
Allegory of Ventôse from the French Republican Calendar

In 1791, he won Prix de Rome for his painting of Regulus returning to Carthage and became the last painter sent to Rome during the reign of Louis XVI. He was living at the Villa Medici in 1793, when protests against French incursions into Italy forced him to flee the Papal States and seek refuge in Florence, where he briefly taught at the Academy.

He returned to Paris in 1796 and was married later that year. Financial problems soon forced him to do decorative work and illustrations, including twelve allegories for the months in the French Republican Calendar. In 1800, he worked at the Château de Malmaison in collaboration with the architect Charles Percier. His work there featured eight Pompeian style dancers for the dining room. In 1809, the Sénat commissioned a monumental oil painting, depicting the establishment of the Cisalpine Republic, but he was unable to complete it successfully.

From 1807 to 1808, he worked with architect Jean-François Chalgrin, managing all the decorations for the Théâtre de l'Impératrice. The theater was gutted by fire in 1818, and his decorations survive only in written descriptions. The following year, he helped Chalgrin decorate a full-scale wood, stucco and canvas mockup of the proposed Arc de Triomphe. In 1811, he painted Romulus and Remus above the doors of the Sénat at the Palais du Luxembourg for the baptism of Napoléon François Charles Joseph Bonaparte.

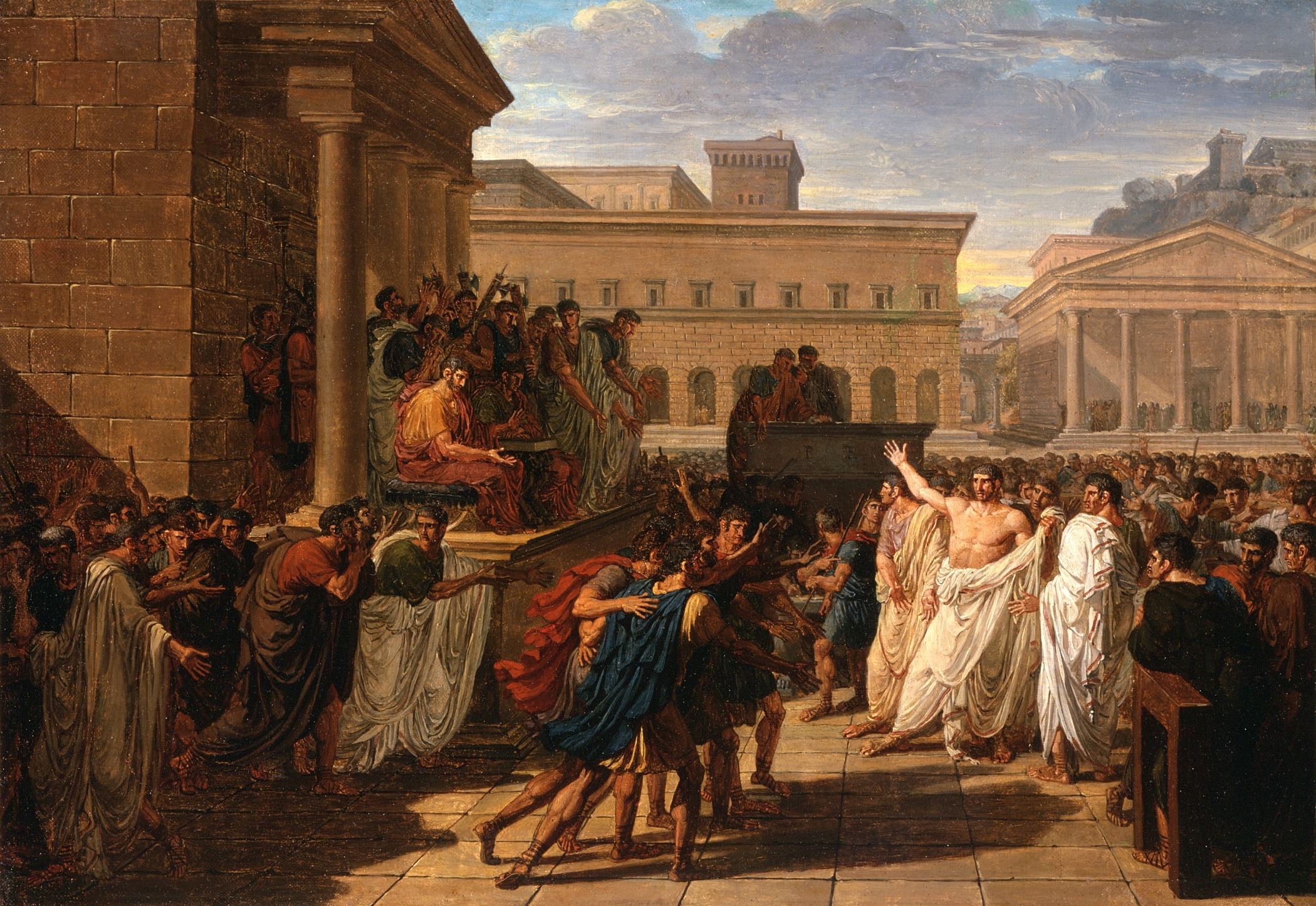
Brutus Listening to Ambassadors from the Tarquins (c.1815), Los Angeles County Museum of Art

From 1800 to 1814, he created designs for the Manufacture de Sèvres. Then, from 1814 to 1816, he collaborated with Merry-Joseph Blondel in creating a collection of wallpapers based on the theme of Cupid and Psyche, from a story by Jean de La Fontaine. In 1816, taking advantage of a peaceful period, he visited London, where the Prince Regent commissioned him to create decorations for a celebration at Carlton House.

In 1820, he designed decorations to commemorate the birth of the Duc de Bordeaux. In 1823, he was named a Knight in the Légion d'Honneur as a designer for the King's Cabinet. Two years later, he created his last major works for the Coronation of Charles X at Reims.

He died after a brief illness and is buried in Père-Lachaise Cemetery. His remaining works were sold in an auction at his home.
