= Maturin =

Maturin may refer to:

== Places ==
- Maturín, city in the state of Monagas in Venezuela
  - Maturin Airport
- Maturín Municipality, Monagas, Venezuela

== People ==
=== Given name ===
- Maturin Murray Ballou (1820–1895), American writer and publisher
- Maturin Cordier (Corderius) (c. 1479–1564), French-Swiss theologian, teacher, humanist, and pedagogue
- Maturin Veyssière La Croze (1661–1739), French Benedictine historian, orientalist, royal librarian and professor
- Maturin Le Petit (1693–1739), French Jesuit priest and missionary
- Maturin Livingston (1769–1847), American lawyer and politician from New York
- Maturin Livingston Jr. (1816–1888), American merchant, son of the above

=== Surname ===
- Basil W. Maturin (1847–1915), Irish-American-British priest and writer
- Charles Robert Maturin (1782–1824), Irish author
- Edward Maturin (1812–1881), Irish-born American poet, novelist and professor of Greek
- Eric Maturin (1883–1957), British actor
- Gabriel Maturin (died 1746), Irish Anglican Dean of Kildare from 1737 to 1745 and Dean of St Patrick's Cathedral from 1745 to 1746
- Henry Maturin (1842–1920), Irish cricketer
- Óscar Maturín (born 1979), Mexican footballer
- Peter Maturin, Anglican priest, Dean of Killala from 1724 until 1741 and Vicar-general of the Diocese of Killala and Achonry
- William Maturin (1814–1889), senior public servant in Australia and Great Britain

== Fictional characters ==
- Stephen Maturin, a ship's doctor in Patrick O'Brian's Aubrey–Maturin book series
- Maturin the Turtle, a guardian of the beams in Stephen King's The Dark Tower and It

== See also ==
- Mathurin (disambiguation)
