= Soisy =

Soisy is the name or part of the name of four communes of France:

- Soisy-Bouy in the Seine-et-Marne département
- Soisy-sous-Montmorency in the Val-d'Oise département
- Soisy-sur-École in the Essonne département
- Soisy-sur-Seine in the Essonne département
