= Arrondissement of Évry =

Coordinates: 48°37′39″N 2°26′29″E

Évry
- Arrondissement
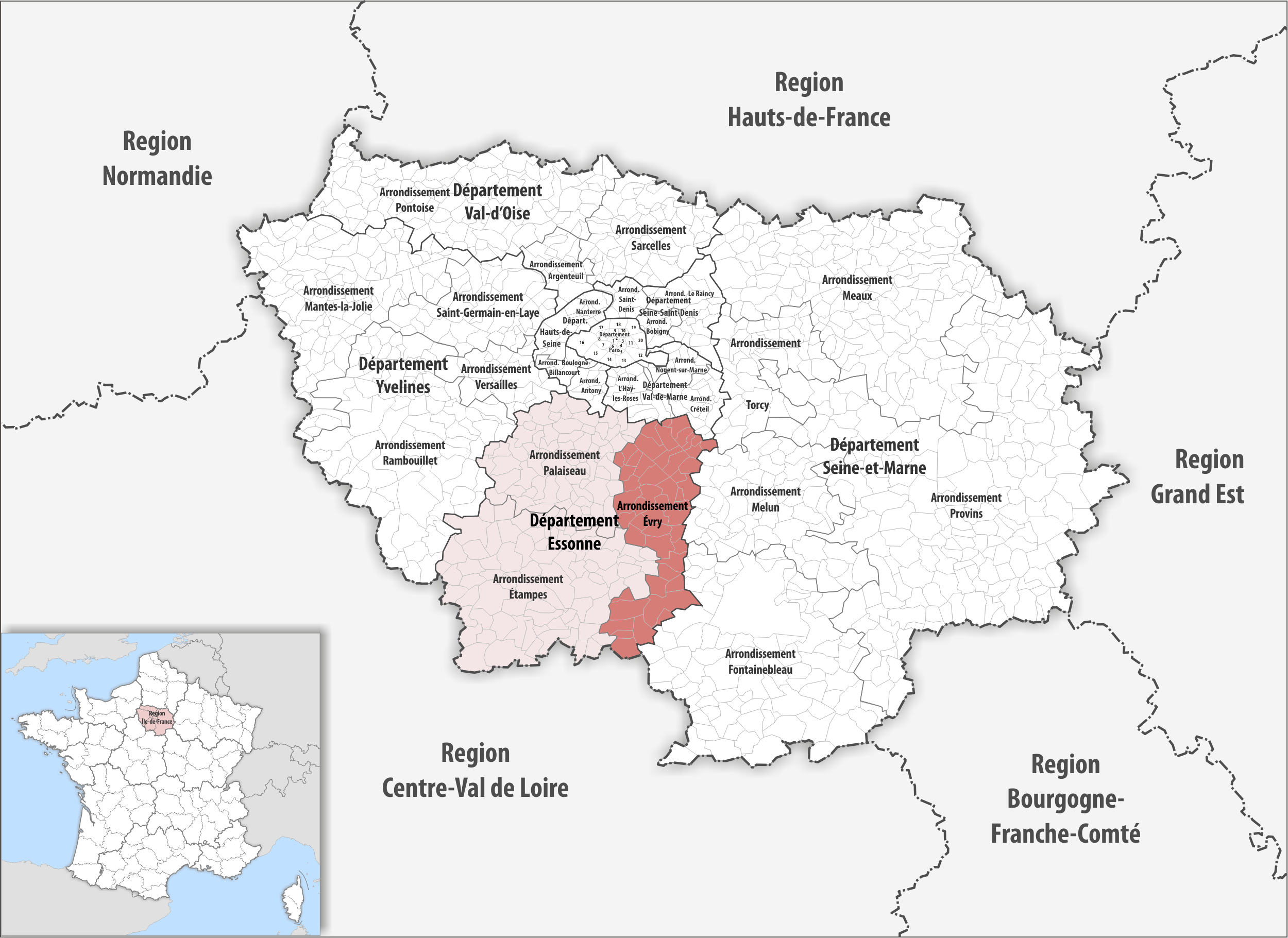
- Location within the region Île-de-France
- Country: France
- Region: Île-de-France
- Department: Essonne
- No. of communes: {{{nbcomm}}}
- Area: 469.0 km^{2} (181.1 sq mi)
- Population (2023): 550,545
  - Density: 1,174/km^{2} (3,040/sq mi)
- INSEE code: 912

The arrondissement of Évry is an arrondissement of France in the Essonne department in the Île-de-France region. It has 51 communes. Its population is 542,688 (2021), and its area is 469.0 km^{2} (181.1 sq mi).

== Composition ==
The communes of the arrondissement of Évry, and their INSEE codes, are:

1. Auvernaux (91037)
2. Ballancourt-sur-Essonne (91045)
3. Boigneville (91069)
4. Bondoufle (91086)
5. Boussy-Saint-Antoine (91097)
6. Brunoy (91114)
7. Buno-Bonnevaux (91121)
8. Champcueil (91135)
9. Chevannes (91159)
10. Corbeil-Essonnes (91174)
11. Courances (91180)
12. Courdimanche-sur-Essonne (91184)
13. Crosne (91191)
14. Dannemois (91195)
15. Draveil (91201)
16. Écharcon (91204)
17. Épinay-sous-Sénart (91215)
18. Étiolles (91225)
19. Évry-Courcouronnes (91228)
20. Fleury-Mérogis (91235)
21. Fontenay-le-Vicomte (91244)
22. Gironville-sur-Essonne (91273)
23. Grigny (91286)
24. Le Coudray-Montceaux (91179)
25. Lisses (91340)
26. Maisse (91359)
27. Mennecy (91386)
28. Milly-la-Forêt (91405)
29. Moigny-sur-École (91408)
30. Montgeron (91421)
31. Morsang-sur-Orge (91434)
32. Morsang-sur-Seine (91435)
33. Nainville-les-Roches (91441)
34. Oncy-sur-École (91463)
35. Ormoy (91468)
36. Prunay-sur-Essonne (91507)
37. Quincy-sous-Sénart (91514)
38. Ris-Orangis (91521)
39. Saint-Germain-lès-Corbeil (91553)
40. Saint-Pierre-du-Perray (91573)
41. Saintry-sur-Seine (91577)
42. Soisy-sur-École (91599)
43. Soisy-sur-Seine (91600)
44. Tigery (91617)
45. Varennes-Jarcy (91631)
46. Vert-le-Grand (91648)
47. Vert-le-Petit (91649)
48. Vigneux-sur-Seine (91657)
49. Villabé (91659)
50. Viry-Châtillon (91687)
51. Yerres (91691)

== History ==
The arrondissement of Évry was created in 1966 as part of the department Seine-et-Oise. In 1968 it became part of the new department Essonne.

As a result of the reorganisation of the cantons of France which came into effect in 2015, the borders of the cantons are no longer related to the borders of the arrondissements. The cantons of the arrondissement of Évry were, as of January 2015:

1. Brunoy
2. Corbeil-Essonnes-Est
3. Corbeil-Essonnes-Ouest
4. Draveil
5. Épinay-sous-Sénart
6. Évry-Nord
7. Évry-Sud
8. Grigny
9. Mennecy
10. Milly-la-Forêt
11. Montgeron
12. Morsang-sur-Orge
13. Ris-Orangis
14. Saint-Germain-lès-Corbeil
15. Vigneux-sur-Seine
16. Viry-Châtillon
17. Yerres
