= Roissy =

Roissy can refer to:

- Roissy-en-Brie in the Seine-et-Marne département in France
- Roissy-en-France in the Val-d'Oise département in France
- The hamlet of Roissy, within the commune of Ormoy, Essonne in France
- Roissy-Charles de Gaulle Airport, located near Roissy-en-France
