= Maturen =

Maturen is a surname. Notable people with the surname include:

- David Maturen (born 1948), American politician
- Mike Maturen (born 1964), American political activist

== See also ==
- Maturin (disambiguation)
