= Mathurin (given name) =

Mathurin is a French given name. Notable people with the name include:

- Saint Mathurin or Maturinus (d. 300), French exorcist and missionary
- Mathurin Jacques Brisson (1723–1806), French zoologist and natural philosopher
- Mathurin Cordier or Corderius (ca. 1480 – 1564), French educator
- Mathurin Henrio (1929–1944), young French resistant
- Mathurin Janssaud (1857–1940), French illustrator
- Mathurin Kameni (born 1978), Cameroonian football player
- Simon Mathurin Lantara (1729–1778), French landscape painter
- Mathurin Moreau (1822-1912), French sculptor
- Mathurin Nago, Beninese politician
- Mathurin Régnier (1573–1613), French satirist

== See also ==
- Mathurin (surname)
