= Mathurin =

Mathurin is a French given name that may refer to:

- Mathurin (given name), includes a list of people with the name
- Mathurin (surname), includes a list of people with the name
- Mathurin, an early member of the Trinitarian Order based in the church of Saint-Mathurin in Paris
- Port Mathurin, the capital of the island of Rodrigues
