= Le Coudray-Montceaux =

Commune in Île-de-France, France

- Commune
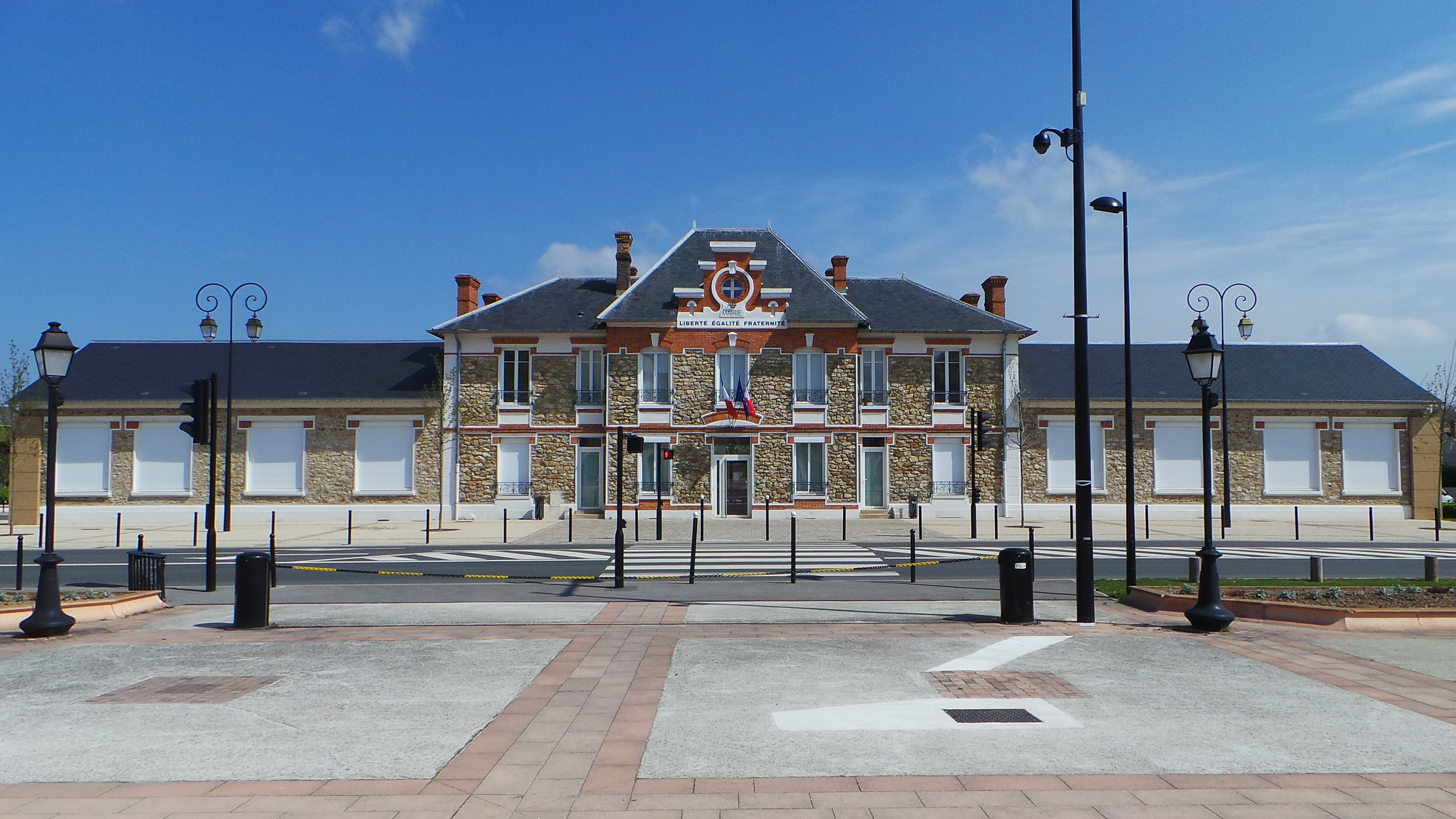
- The town hall of Le-Coudray-Montceaux

- Coat of arms
- Location of Le Coudray-Montceaux
- Location within France Location within Île-de-France (region)
- Coordinates: 48°33′57″N 2°29′09″E
- Country: France
- Region: Île-de-France
- Department: Essonne
- Arrondissement: Évry
- Canton: Mennecy
- Intercommunality: CA Grand Paris Sud Seine-Essonne-Sénart

Government
  - Mayor (2020–2026): Aurélie Gros
- Area^{1}: 11.44 km^{2} (4.42 sq mi)
- Highest elevation: 100 m (330 ft)
- Lowest elevation: 32 m (105 ft)
- Population (2023): 4,801
  - Density: 419.7/km^{2} (1,087/sq mi)
- Time zone: UTC+01:00 (CET)
  - Summer (DST): UTC+02:00 (CEST)
- INSEE/Postal code: 91179 /91830
- ^{1} French Land Register data, which excludes lakes, ponds, glaciers > 1 km^{2} (0.386 sq mi or 247 acres) and river estuaries.

Le Coudray-Montceaux (French pronunciation: [lə kudʁɛ mɔ̃so]) is a commune in the Essonne department in Île-de-France in northern France.

== Population ==
Historical population
Year	Pop.	±% p.a.
1968	998	—
1975	969	−0.42%
1982	2,248	+12.77%
1990	2,494	+1.31%
1999	2,800	+1.29%
2007	4,250	+5.35%
2012	4,728	+2.15%
2017	4,865	+0.57%
2023	4,801	−0.22%
Source: INSEE

Inhabitants of Le Coudray-Montceaux are known as Coudraysiens in French.

== See also ==
- Communes of the Essonne department
