= Nainville-les-Roches =

Commune in Île-de-France, France

- Commune
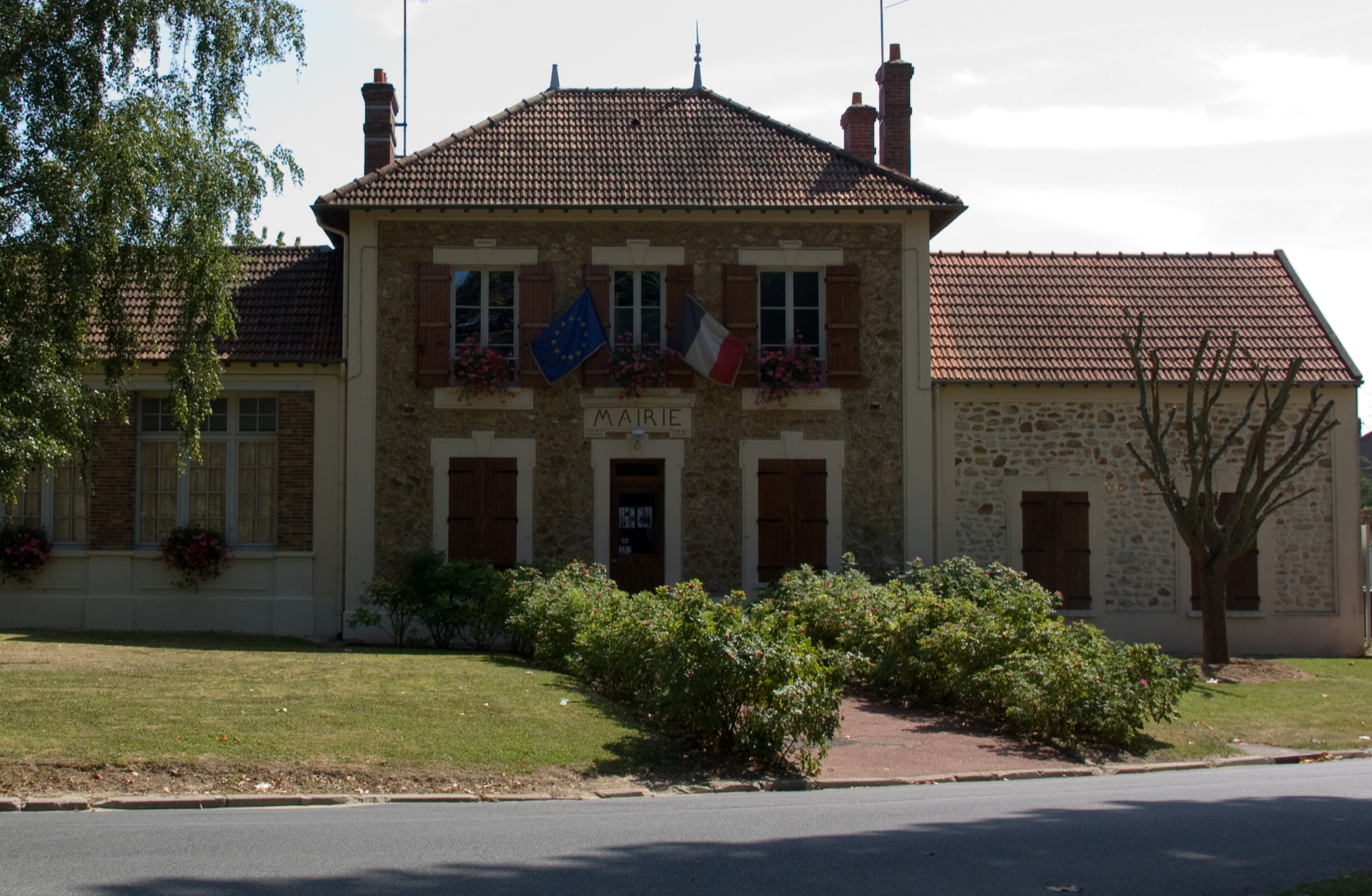
- The town hall in Nainville-les-Roches
- Location of Nainville-les-Roches
- Location within France Location within Île-de-France (region)
- Coordinates: 48°30′17″N 2°29′34″E
- Country: France
- Region: Île-de-France
- Department: Essonne
- Arrondissement: Évry
- Canton: Mennecy
- Intercommunality: Val d'Essonne

Government
  - Mayor (2020–2026): Frédéric Mouret
- Area^{1}: 5.93 km^{2} (2.29 sq mi)
- Highest elevation: 84 m (276 ft)
- Lowest elevation: 74 m (243 ft)
- Population (2023): 564
  - Density: 95.1/km^{2} (246/sq mi)
- Time zone: UTC+01:00 (CET)
  - Summer (DST): UTC+02:00 (CEST)
- INSEE/Postal code: 91441 /91750
- ^{1} French Land Register data, which excludes lakes, ponds, glaciers > 1 km^{2} (0.386 sq mi or 247 acres) and river estuaries.

Nainville-les-Roches (French pronunciation: [nɛ̃vil le ʁɔʃ]) is a commune in the Essonne department in Île-de-France in northern France.

Inhabitants of Nainville-les-Roches are known as Nainvillois. The historian Jean Gagé (1902–1986) was born in Nainville-les-Roches.

== Geography ==
=== Climate ===
Nainville-les-Roches has an oceanic climate (Köppen climate classification Cfb)). The average annual temperature in Nainville-les-Roches is 11.5 °C (52.7 °F). The average annual rainfall is 702.3 mm (27.65 in) with December as the wettest month. The temperatures are highest on average in July, at around 20.1 °C (68.2 °F), and lowest in January, at around 4.1 °C (39.4 °F). The highest temperature ever recorded in Nainville-les-Roches was 39.0 °C (102.2 °F) on 4 August 1990; the coldest temperature ever recorded was −17.5 °C (0.5 °F) on 9 January 1985.

Climate data for Nainville-les-Roches (1991−2020 normals, extremes 1979−2006)
Month	Jan	Feb	Mar	Apr	May	Jun	Jul	Aug	Sep	Oct	Nov	Dec	Year
Record high °C (°F)	16.5 (61.7)	21.5 (70.7)	25.5 (77.9)	29.3 (84.7)	33.0 (91.4)	35.1 (95.2)	37.4 (99.3)	39.0 (102.2)	32.0 (89.6)	30.2 (86.4)	20.5 (68.9)	17.2 (63.0)	39.0 (102.2)
Mean daily maximum °C (°F)	6.7 (44.1)	8.2 (46.8)	12.8 (55.0)	15.5 (59.9)	19.8 (67.6)	23.3 (73.9)	26.3 (79.3)	25.9 (78.6)	21.1 (70.0)	16.0 (60.8)	10.1 (50.2)	7.1 (44.8)	16.1 (61.0)
Daily mean °C (°F)	4.1 (39.4)	4.8 (40.6)	8.1 (46.6)	10.2 (50.4)	14.3 (57.7)	17.5 (63.5)	20.1 (68.2)	19.7 (67.5)	15.7 (60.3)	11.8 (53.2)	7.0 (44.6)	4.6 (40.3)	11.5 (52.7)
Mean daily minimum °C (°F)	1.4 (34.5)	1.3 (34.3)	3.4 (38.1)	4.9 (40.8)	8.7 (47.7)	11.6 (52.9)	14.0 (57.2)	13.5 (56.3)	10.2 (50.4)	7.7 (45.9)	3.8 (38.8)	2.0 (35.6)	6.9 (44.4)
Record low °C (°F)	−17.5 (0.5)	−13.3 (8.1)	−12.4 (9.7)	−5.0 (23.0)	−1.5 (29.3)	1.8 (35.2)	4.5 (40.1)	2.5 (36.5)	2.0 (35.6)	−4.5 (23.9)	−11.0 (12.2)	−11.0 (12.2)	−17.5 (0.5)
Average precipitation mm (inches)	56.7 (2.23)	50.5 (1.99)	51.7 (2.04)	52.7 (2.07)	68.4 (2.69)	63.3 (2.49)	49.8 (1.96)	48.6 (1.91)	60.1 (2.37)	64.2 (2.53)	63.6 (2.50)	72.7 (2.86)	702.3 (27.65)
Average precipitation days (≥ 1.0 mm)	11.2	10.1	9.1	9.4	9.4	8.8	7.3	7.0	8.4	10.7	10.8	12.3	114.4
Source: Météo-France

== See also ==
- Communes of the Essonne department
