= Dannemois =

Commune in Île-de-France, France

- Commune
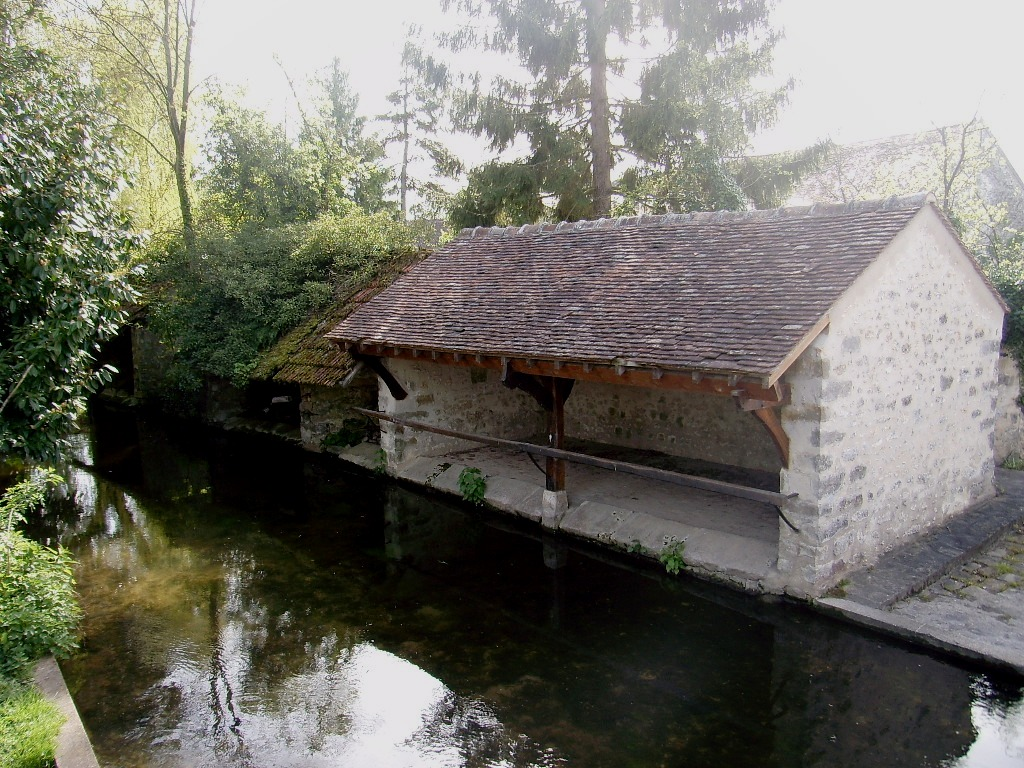
- The laundry
- Location of Dannemois
- Location within France Location within Île-de-France (region)
- Coordinates: 48°27′08″N 2°28′30″E
- Country: France
- Region: Île-de-France
- Department: Essonne
- Arrondissement: Évry
- Canton: Mennecy

Government
  - Mayor (2025–2026): Richard Heysen
- Area^{1}: 8.43 km^{2} (3.25 sq mi)
- Highest elevation: 138 m (453 ft)
- Lowest elevation: 51 m (167 ft)
- Population (2023): 865
  - Density: 103/km^{2} (266/sq mi)
- Time zone: UTC+01:00 (CET)
  - Summer (DST): UTC+02:00 (CEST)
- INSEE/Postal code: 91195 /91490
- ^{1} French Land Register data, which excludes lakes, ponds, glaciers > 1 km^{2} (0.386 sq mi or 247 acres) and river estuaries.

Dannemois (French pronunciation: [danmwa]) is a commune in the Essonne department in Île-de-France in northern France.

Inhabitants of Dannemois are known as Dannemoisiens.

== Plane crash ==
On 12 December 1956, A Vickers Viscount 708 Reg: F-BGNK of Air France crashed killing all five people on board.

== Personalities ==
- Claude François, French singer, had a home in Dannemois.

== See also ==
- Communes of the Essonne department
