= Mathurin (surname) =

Mathurin is a surname. Notable people with the name include:

- Bennedict Mathurin (born 2002), Canadian basketball player
- Cletus Mathurin (born 1982), Saint Lucian cricketer
- Cowin Mathurin (born 1983), Saint Lucian footballer
- Gail Mathurin (born 1960), Jamaican ambassador
- Garey Mathurin (born 1983), Saint Lucian cricketer
- Kevin Mathurin (born 1973), English actor
- Ruthny Mathurin (born 2001), Haitian footballer

== See also ==
- Mathurin (given name)
