= Oncy-sur-École =

Commune in Île-de-France, France

- Commune
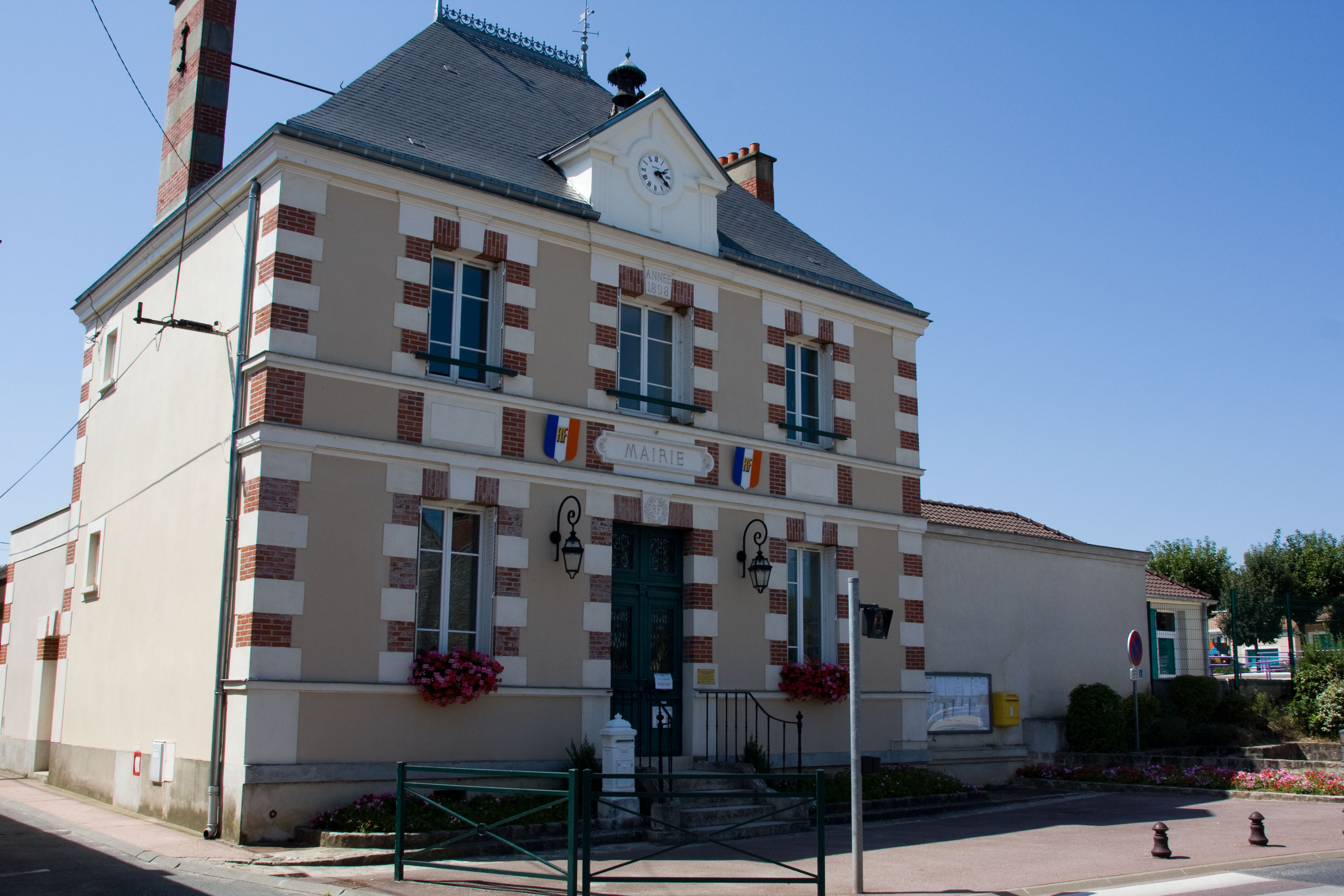
- The town hall in Oncy-sur-École

- Coat of arms
- Location of Oncy-sur-École
- Location within France Location within Île-de-France (region)
- Coordinates: 48°22′57″N 2°28′26″E
- Country: France
- Region: Île-de-France
- Department: Essonne
- Arrondissement: Évry
- Canton: Mennecy
- Intercommunality: CC des 2 Vallées

Government
  - Mayor (2020–2026): Bruno Delecour
- Area^{1}: 5.37 km^{2} (2.07 sq mi)
- Highest elevation: 132 m (433 ft)
- Lowest elevation: 62 m (203 ft)
- Population (2023): 1,042
  - Density: 194/km^{2} (503/sq mi)
- Time zone: UTC+01:00 (CET)
  - Summer (DST): UTC+02:00 (CEST)
- INSEE/Postal code: 91463 /91490
- ^{1} French Land Register data, which excludes lakes, ponds, glaciers > 1 km^{2} (0.386 sq mi or 247 acres) and river estuaries.

Oncy-sur-École (French pronunciation: [ɔ̃si syʁ ekɔl]) is a commune in the Essonne department in Île-de-France in northern France.

Inhabitants of Oncy-sur-École are known as Oncéens.

Painter Simon Mathurin Lantara was a native of the commune.

== See also ==
- Communes of the Essonne department
