= Auvernaux =

Commune in Île-de-France, France

- Commune
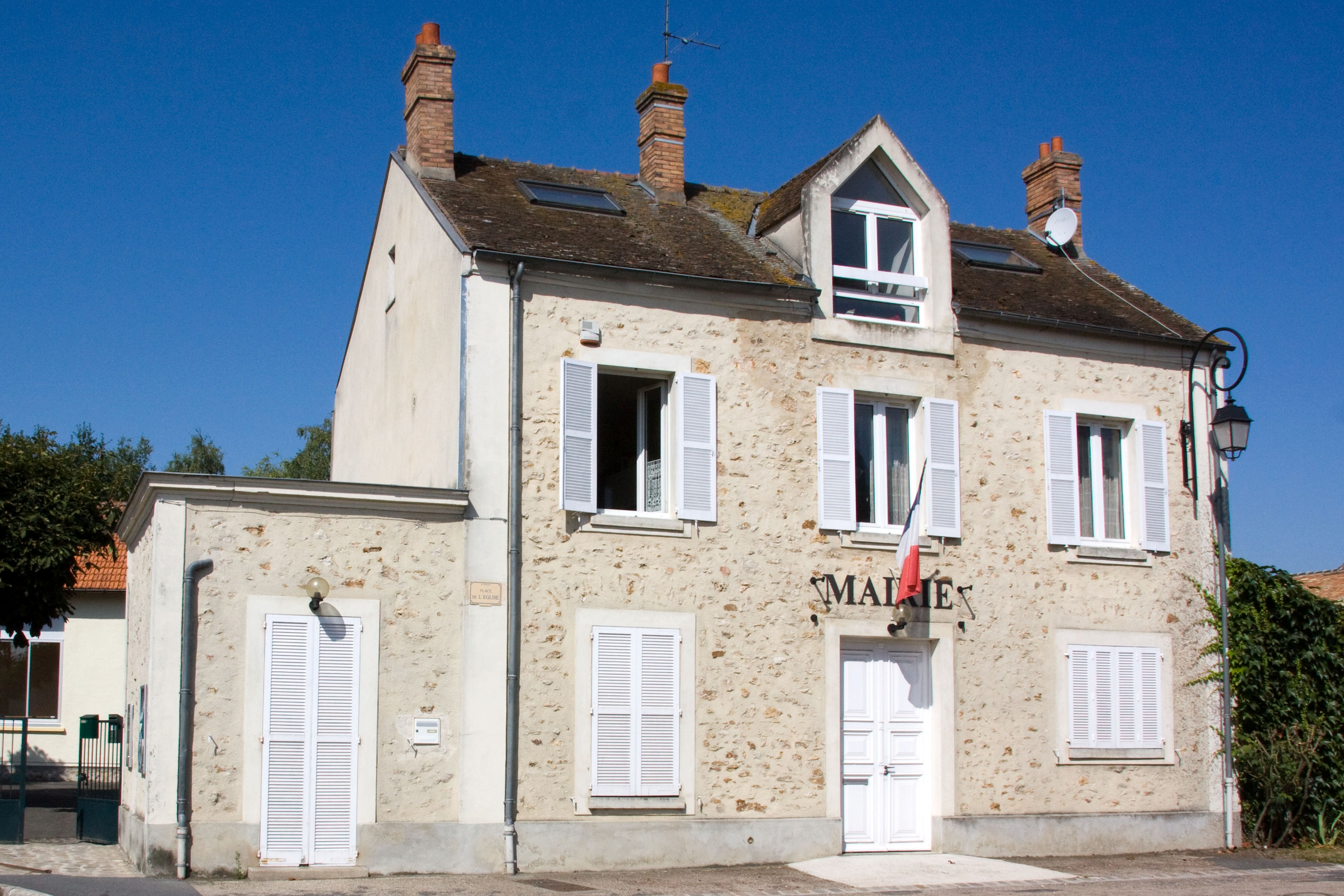
- The town hall of Auvernaux

- Coat of arms
- Location of Auvernaux
- Location within France Location within Île-de-France (region)
- Coordinates: 48°31′41″N 2°29′34″E
- Country: France
- Region: Île-de-France
- Department: Essonne
- Arrondissement: Évry
- Canton: Mennecy
- Intercommunality: CC Val Essonne

Government
  - Mayor (2020–2026): Wilfrid Hilgenga
- Area^{1}: 6.50 km^{2} (2.51 sq mi)
- Highest elevation: 92 m (302 ft)
- Lowest elevation: 72 m (236 ft)
- Population (2023): 332
  - Density: 51.1/km^{2} (132/sq mi)
- Time zone: UTC+01:00 (CET)
  - Summer (DST): UTC+02:00 (CEST)
- INSEE/Postal code: 91037 /91830
- ^{1} French Land Register data, which excludes lakes, ponds, glaciers > 1 km^{2} (0.386 sq mi or 247 acres) and river estuaries.

Auvernaux (French pronunciation: [ovɛʁno]) is a commune located in the Essonne department in Île-de-France in northern France.

Inhabitants are known as Auvernois in French.

== See also ==
- Communes of the Essonne department
