= Baulne =

Commune in Île-de-France, France

- Commune
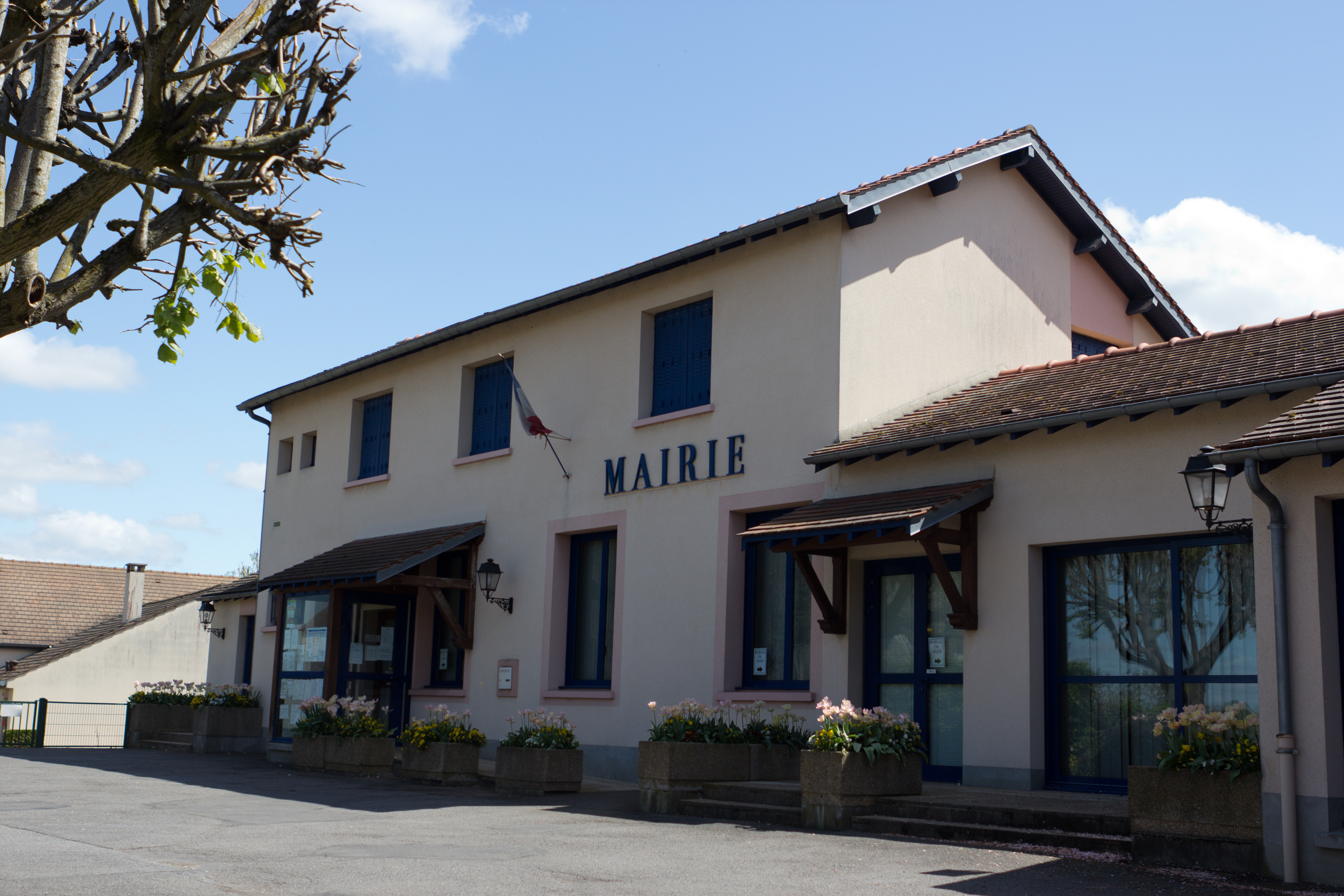
- The town hall of Baulme

- Coat of arms
- Location of Baulne
- Location within France Location within Île-de-France (region)
- Coordinates: 48°29′32″N 2°21′35″E
- Country: France
- Region: Île-de-France
- Department: Essonne
- Arrondissement: Étampes
- Canton: Mennecy
- Intercommunality: Val d'Essonne

Government
  - Mayor (2023–2026): Xavier Guilbert
- Area^{1}: 8.17 km^{2} (3.15 sq mi)
- Highest elevation: 144 m (472 ft)
- Lowest elevation: 49 m (161 ft)
- Population (2023): 1,448
  - Density: 177/km^{2} (459/sq mi)
- Time zone: UTC+01:00 (CET)
  - Summer (DST): UTC+02:00 (CEST)
- INSEE/Postal code: 91047 /91590
- ^{1} French Land Register data, which excludes lakes, ponds, glaciers > 1 km^{2} (0.386 sq mi or 247 acres) and river estuaries.

Baulne (French pronunciation: [boln]) is a commune in the Essonne department in Île-de-France in northern France. Inhabitants of Baulne are known as Baulnois.

== Origin of the village name ==
The origin of the name Baulne is unknown. It was created under the same name as it is today.

== Geographical situation ==
Baulne is 52 km (32 mi) south of Paris Notre Dame, kilometre zero for the roads in France, 17 km (11 mi) south east of Évry, 16 km (10 mi) north east of Étampes, 1 km (1 mi) north of La Ferté-Alais, 13 km (8 mi) south east of Arpajon, 13 km (8 mi) north west of Milly-la-Forêt, 16 km (10 mi) south east of Corbeil-Essonnes, 18 km (11 mi) south east of Montlhéry, 26 km (16 mi) south east of Palaiseau, 56 km (35 mi) east of Dourdan. It is 107 km (66 mi) away from its former homonym Baulne-en-Brie in the department of Aisne.

== See also ==
- Communes of the Essonne department
