= Boigneville =

Commune in Île-de-France, France

- Commune
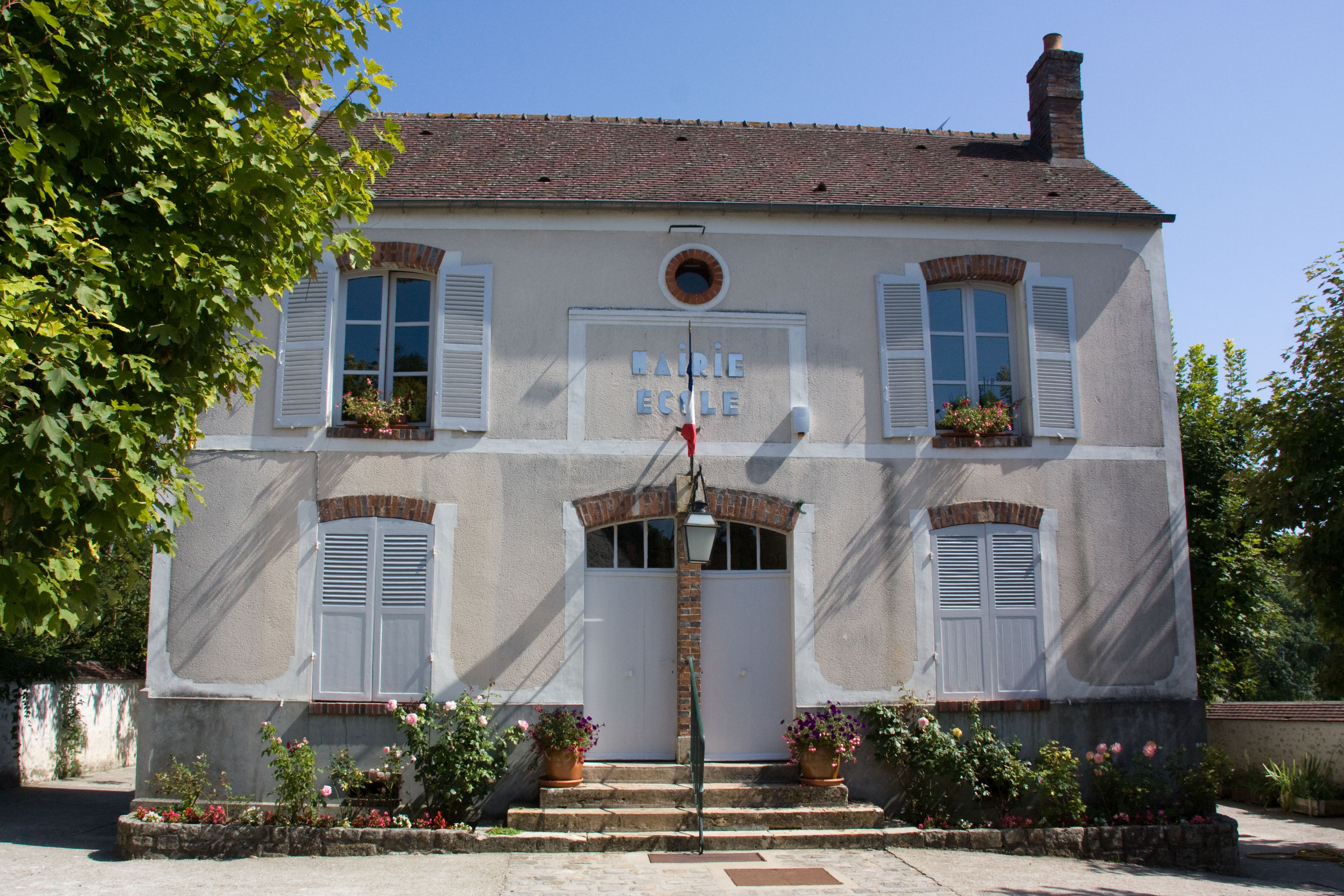
- The town hall of Boigneville
- Location of Boigneville
- Location within France Location within Île-de-France (region)
- Coordinates: 48°20′06″N 2°22′15″E
- Country: France
- Region: Île-de-France
- Department: Essonne
- Arrondissement: Évry
- Canton: Mennecy

Government
  - Mayor (2020–2026): Jean-Jacques Boussaingault
- Area^{1}: 15.80 km^{2} (6.10 sq mi)
- Highest elevation: 143 m (469 ft)
- Lowest elevation: 67 m (220 ft)
- Population (2023): 369
  - Density: 23.4/km^{2} (60.5/sq mi)
- Time zone: UTC+01:00 (CET)
  - Summer (DST): UTC+02:00 (CEST)
- INSEE/Postal code: 91069 /91720
- ^{1} French Land Register data, which excludes lakes, ponds, glaciers > 1 km^{2} (0.386 sq mi or 247 acres) and river estuaries.

Boigneville (French pronunciation: [bwaɲvil]) is a commune in the Essonne department in Île-de-France in northern France.

Inhabitants of Boigneville are known as Boignevillois.

== Geography ==
=== Climate ===
Boigneville has an oceanic climate (Köppen climate classification Cfb). The average annual temperature in Boigneville is 11.5 °C (52.7 °F). The average annual rainfall is 615.6 mm (24.24 in) with May as the wettest month. The temperatures are highest on average in July, at around 19.9 °C (67.8 °F), and lowest in January, at around 4.3 °C (39.7 °F). The highest temperature ever recorded in Boigneville was 40.9 °C (105.6 °F) on 25 July 2019; the coldest temperature ever recorded was −18.1 °C (−0.6 °F) on 16 January 1985.

Climate data for Boigneville (1991−2020 normals, extremes 1979−present)
Month	Jan	Feb	Mar	Apr	May	Jun	Jul	Aug	Sep	Oct	Nov	Dec	Year
Record high °C (°F)	15.5 (59.9)	21.4 (70.5)	25.5 (77.9)	28.4 (83.1)	31.6 (88.9)	37.2 (99.0)	40.9 (105.6)	39.7 (103.5)	34.7 (94.5)	30.3 (86.5)	21.8 (71.2)	17.2 (63.0)	40.9 (105.6)
Mean daily maximum °C (°F)	6.9 (44.4)	8.2 (46.8)	12.3 (54.1)	15.9 (60.6)	19.4 (66.9)	22.9 (73.2)	26.0 (78.8)	25.8 (78.4)	21.4 (70.5)	16.1 (61.0)	10.5 (50.9)	7.2 (45.0)	16.1 (61.0)
Daily mean °C (°F)	4.3 (39.7)	4.8 (40.6)	7.8 (46.0)	10.6 (51.1)	14.0 (57.2)	17.3 (63.1)	19.9 (67.8)	19.6 (67.3)	15.9 (60.6)	12.0 (53.6)	7.4 (45.3)	4.6 (40.3)	11.5 (52.7)
Mean daily minimum °C (°F)	1.7 (35.1)	1.4 (34.5)	3.3 (37.9)	5.3 (41.5)	8.7 (47.7)	11.7 (53.1)	13.6 (56.5)	13.4 (56.1)	10.4 (50.7)	7.9 (46.2)	4.4 (39.9)	2.1 (35.8)	7.0 (44.6)
Record low °C (°F)	−18.1 (−0.6)	−12.6 (9.3)	−11.6 (11.1)	−4.3 (24.3)	−0.1 (31.8)	1.4 (34.5)	4.0 (39.2)	4.6 (40.3)	2.0 (35.6)	−3.3 (26.1)	−10.7 (12.7)	−11.5 (11.3)	−18.1 (−0.6)
Average precipitation mm (inches)	47.6 (1.87)	44.0 (1.73)	43.0 (1.69)	46.9 (1.85)	62.5 (2.46)	50.0 (1.97)	51.0 (2.01)	49.7 (1.96)	49.8 (1.96)	58.1 (2.29)	54.0 (2.13)	59.0 (2.32)	615.6 (24.24)
Average precipitation days (≥ 1.0 mm)	11.3	9.5	8.9	9.0	9.4	8.3	7.6	7.3	7.6	9.8	10.6	11.8	111.2
Source: Météo-France

== See also ==
- Communes of the Essonne department
