= Mondeville, Essonne =

Commune in Île-de-France, France

Mondeville
- Commune
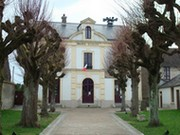
- The town hall in Mondeville
- Location of Mondeville
- Location within France Location within Île-de-France (region)
- Coordinates: 48°29′24″N 2°25′01″E
- Country: France
- Region: Île-de-France
- Department: Essonne
- Arrondissement: Étampes
- Canton: Mennecy

Government
  - Mayor (2024–2026): Stéphanie Grenault
- Area^{1}: 6.70 km^{2} (2.59 sq mi)
- Highest elevation: 156 m (512 ft)
- Lowest elevation: 81 m (266 ft)
- Population (2023): 726
  - Density: 108/km^{2} (281/sq mi)
- Time zone: UTC+01:00 (CET)
  - Summer (DST): UTC+02:00 (CEST)
- INSEE/Postal code: 91412 /91590
- ^{1} French Land Register data, which excludes lakes, ponds, glaciers > 1 km^{2} (0.386 sq mi or 247 acres) and river estuaries.

Mondeville (French pronunciation: [mɔ̃dvil]) is a commune in the Essonne department in Île-de-France in northern France.

Inhabitants of Mondeville are known as Mondevillais.

== See also ==
- Communes of the Essonne department
