= Champcueil =

Commune in Île-de-France, France

- Commune
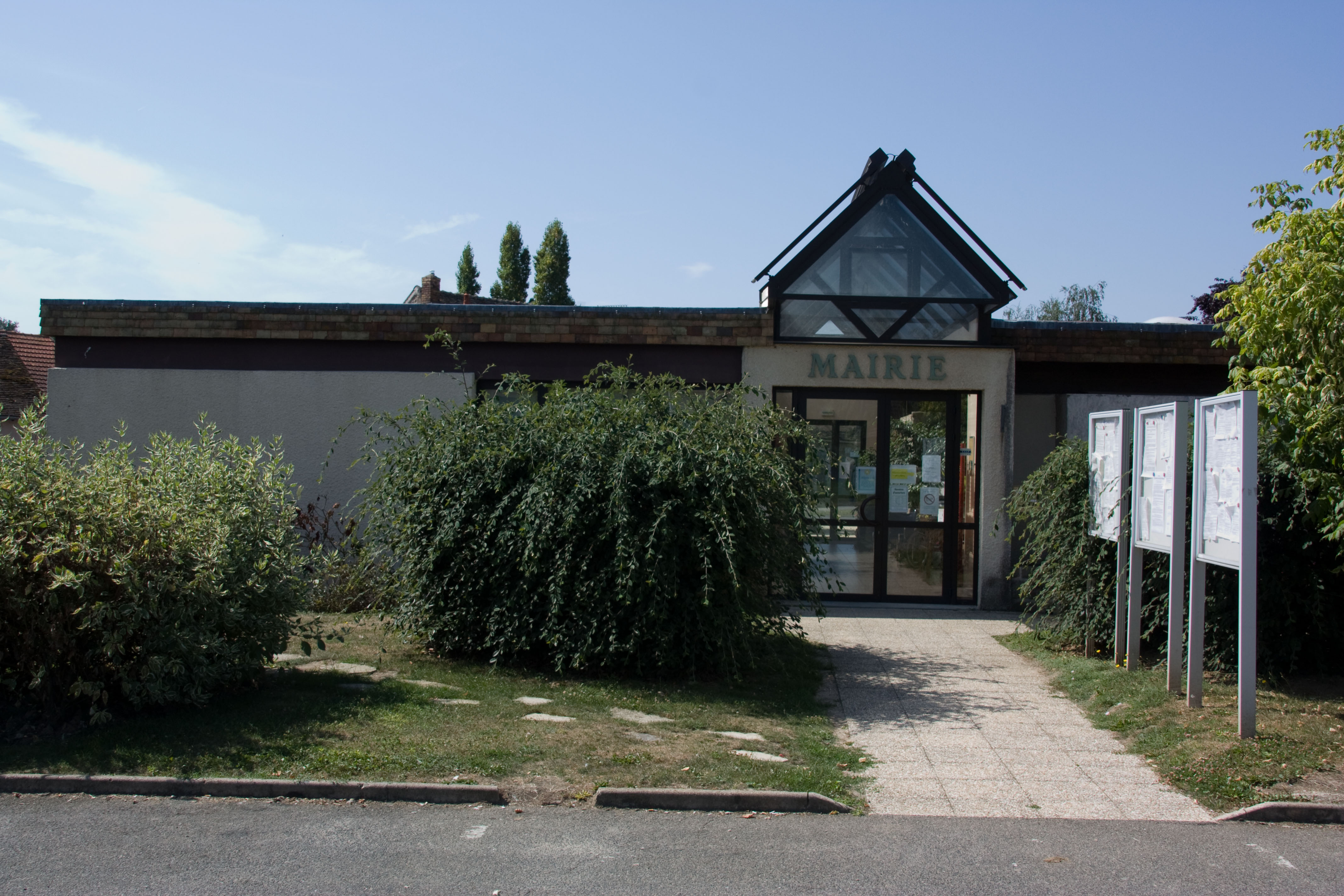
- The town hall of Champcueil

- Coat of arms
- Location of Champcueil
- Location within France Location within Île-de-France (region)
- Coordinates: 48°30′54″N 2°26′40″E
- Country: France
- Region: Île-de-France
- Department: Essonne
- Arrondissement: Évry
- Canton: Mennecy
- Intercommunality: Val d'Essonne

Government
  - Mayor (2020–2026): Sandrine Jacquet
- Area^{1}: 16.35 km^{2} (6.31 sq mi)
- Highest elevation: 156 m (512 ft)
- Lowest elevation: 77 m (253 ft)
- Population (2023): 2,854
  - Density: 174.6/km^{2} (452.1/sq mi)
- Time zone: UTC+01:00 (CET)
  - Summer (DST): UTC+02:00 (CEST)
- INSEE/Postal code: 91135 /91750
- ^{1} French Land Register data, which excludes lakes, ponds, glaciers > 1 km^{2} (0.386 sq mi or 247 acres) and river estuaries.

Champcueil (French: [ʃɑ̃kœj]) is a commune in the Essonne department in the Île-de-France in northern France.

== Population ==
Historical population
Year	Pop.	±% p.a.
1968	1,147	—
1975	2,205	+9.79%
1982	2,129	−0.50%
1990	2,586	+2.46%
1999	2,528	−0.25%
2007	2,753	+1.07%
2012	2,828	+0.54%
2017	2,867	+0.27%
2023	2,854	−0.08%
Source: INSEE

Inhabitants of Champcueil are known as Champcueillois in French.

== See also ==
- Communes of the Essonne department
