= Gironville-sur-Essonne =

Commune in Île-de-France, France

- Commune
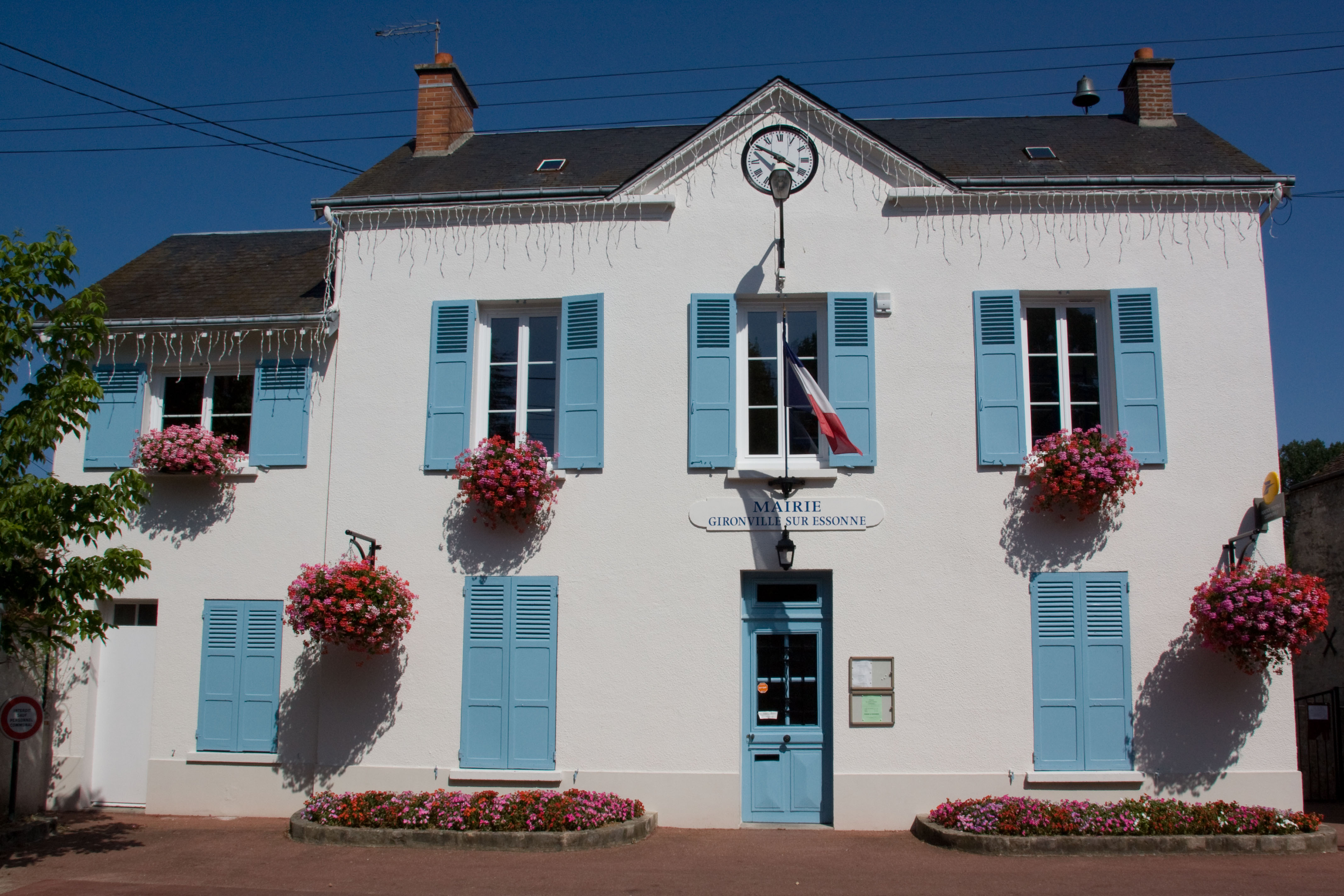
- The town hall in Gironville-sur-Essonne

- Coat of arms
- Location of Gironville-sur-Essonne
- Location within France Location within Île-de-France (region)
- Coordinates: 48°22′18″N 2°22′48″E
- Country: France
- Region: Île-de-France
- Department: Essonne
- Arrondissement: Évry
- Canton: Mennecy

Government
  - Mayor (2020–2026): Alain Joyez
- Area^{1}: 13.21 km^{2} (5.10 sq mi)
- Highest elevation: 146 m (479 ft)
- Lowest elevation: 62 m (203 ft)
- Population (2023): 760
  - Density: 58/km^{2} (150/sq mi)
- Time zone: UTC+01:00 (CET)
  - Summer (DST): UTC+02:00 (CEST)
- INSEE/Postal code: 91273 /91720
- ^{1} French Land Register data, which excludes lakes, ponds, glaciers > 1 km^{2} (0.386 sq mi or 247 acres) and river estuaries.

Gironville-sur-Essonne (French pronunciation: [ʒiʁɔ̃vil syʁ ɛsɔn], literally Gironville on Essonne) is a commune in the Essonne department in Île-de-France in northern France.

Inhabitants of Gironville-sur-Essonne are known as Gironvillois.

== See also ==
- Communes of the Essonne department
