= Buno-Bonnevaux =

Commune in Île-de-France, France

- Commune
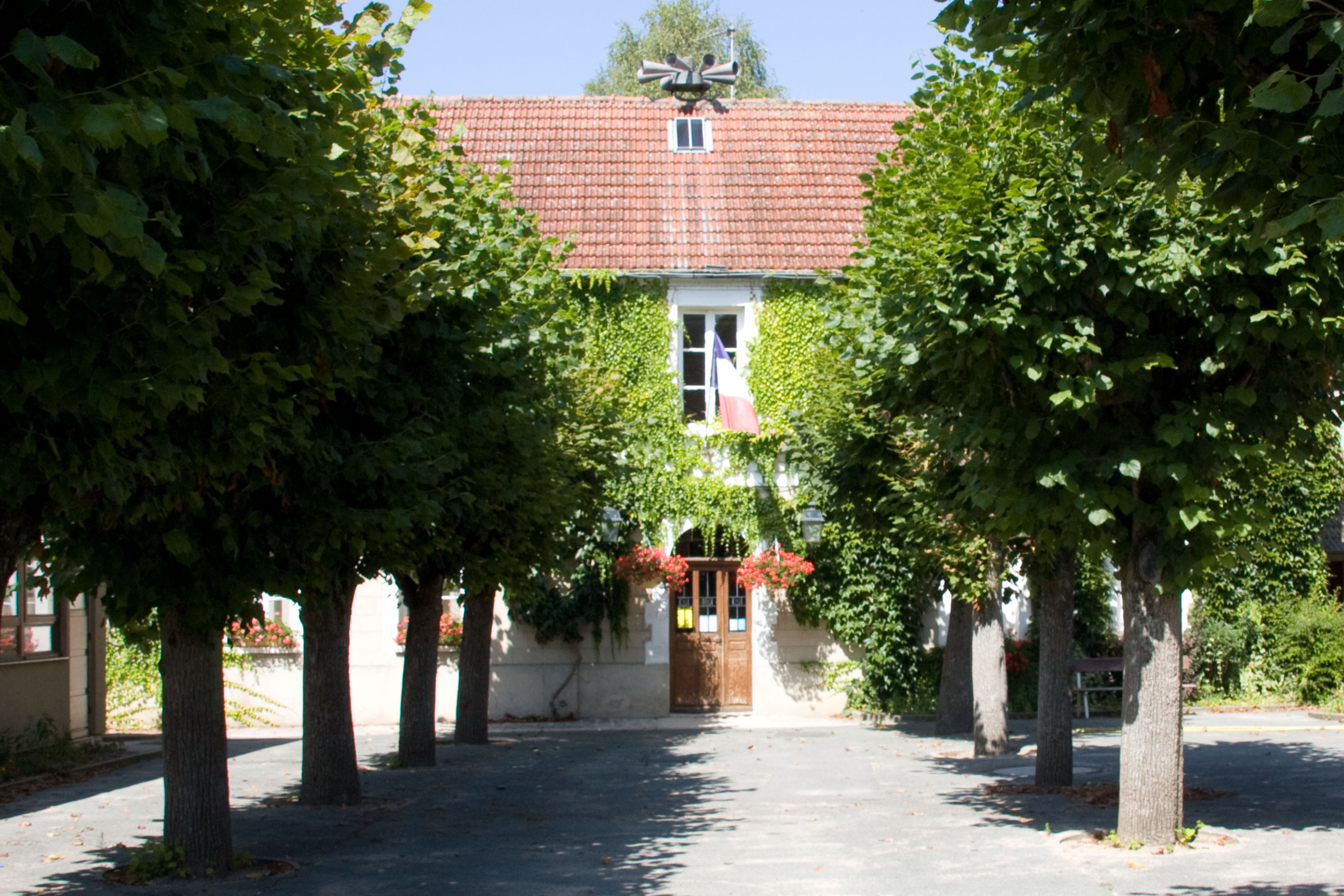
- The town hall of Buno-Bonnevaux
- Location of Buno-Bonnevaux
- Location within France Location within Île-de-France (region)
- Coordinates: 48°21′42″N 2°23′21″E
- Country: France
- Region: Île-de-France
- Department: Essonne
- Arrondissement: Évry
- Canton: Mennecy

Government
  - Mayor (2020–2026): Bernardin Coudoro
- Area^{1}: 15.99 km^{2} (6.17 sq mi)
- Elevation: 126 m (413 ft)
- Highest elevation: 141 m (463 ft)
- Lowest elevation: 63 m (207 ft)
- Population (2023): 527
  - Density: 33.0/km^{2} (85.4/sq mi)
- Time zone: UTC+01:00 (CET)
  - Summer (DST): UTC+02:00 (CEST)
- INSEE/Postal code: 91121 /91720
- ^{1} French Land Register data, which excludes lakes, ponds, glaciers > 1 km^{2} (0.386 sq mi or 247 acres) and river estuaries.

Buno-Bonnevaux (French pronunciation: [byno bɔnvo]) is a commune in the Essonne department in Île-de-France in northern France.

Inhabitants of Buno-Bonnevaux are known as Bonnevaliens in French.

== See also ==
- Communes of the Essonne department
