= Chevannes, Essonne =

Commune in Île-de-France, France

Chevannes
- Commune
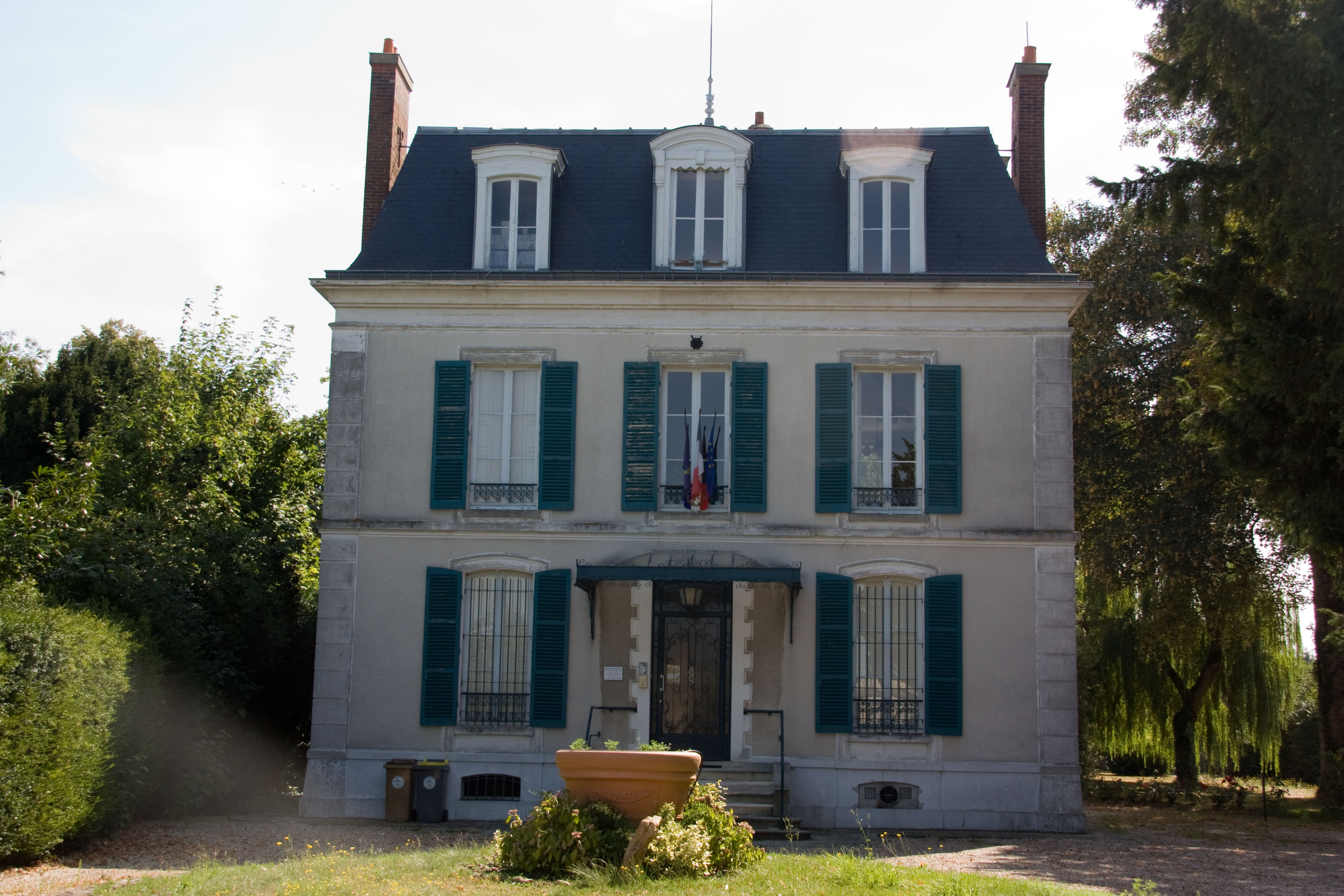
- The town hall in Chevannes
- Location of Chevannes
- Location within France Location within Île-de-France (region)
- Coordinates: 48°31′54″N 2°26′21″E
- Country: France
- Region: Île-de-France
- Department: Essonne
- Arrondissement: Évry
- Canton: Mennecy
- Intercommunality: Val d'Essonne

Government
  - Mayor (2020–2026): Sami Ben Ouada
- Area^{1}: 10.23 km^{2} (3.95 sq mi)
- Highest elevation: 98 m (322 ft)
- Lowest elevation: 72 m (236 ft)
- Population (2023): 1,550
  - Density: 152/km^{2} (392/sq mi)
- Time zone: UTC+01:00 (CET)
  - Summer (DST): UTC+02:00 (CEST)
- INSEE/Postal code: 91159 /91750
- ^{1} French Land Register data, which excludes lakes, ponds, glaciers > 1 km^{2} (0.386 sq mi or 247 acres) and river estuaries.

Chevannes (French pronunciation: [ʃəvan]) is a commune in the Essonne department in Île-de-France in northern France.

Inhabitants of Chevannes are known as Chevannais.

== See also ==
- Communes of the Essonne department
