= Videlles =

Commune in Île-de-France, France

- Commune
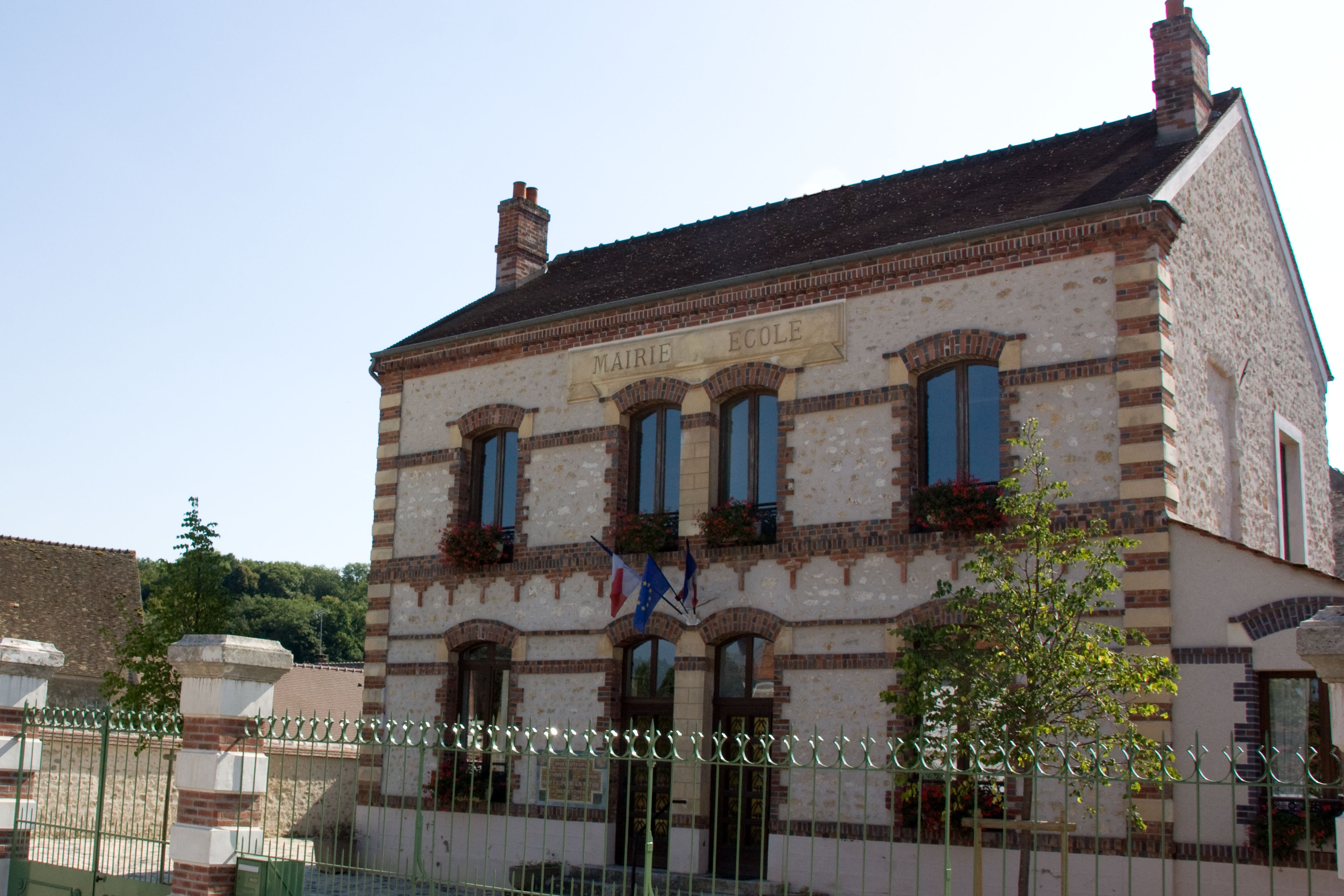
- The town hall in Videlles

- Coat of arms
- Location of Videlles
- Location within France Location within Île-de-France (region)
- Coordinates: 48°27′53″N 2°25′52″E
- Country: France
- Region: Île-de-France
- Department: Essonne
- Arrondissement: Étampes
- Canton: Mennecy

Government
  - Mayor (2020–2026): Gino Bertol
- Area^{1}: 8.70 km^{2} (3.36 sq mi)
- Highest elevation: 149 m (489 ft)
- Lowest elevation: 81 m (266 ft)
- Population (2023): 581
  - Density: 66.8/km^{2} (173/sq mi)
- Time zone: UTC+01:00 (CET)
  - Summer (DST): UTC+02:00 (CEST)
- INSEE/Postal code: 91654 /91890
- ^{1} French Land Register data, which excludes lakes, ponds, glaciers > 1 km^{2} (0.386 sq mi or 247 acres) and river estuaries.

Videlles (French pronunciation: [vidɛl]) is a commune in the Essonne department in Île-de-France in northern France.

Inhabitants of Videlles are known as Videlliers.

== See also ==
- Communes of the Essonne department
