= Maisse =

Commune in Île-de-France, France

- Commune
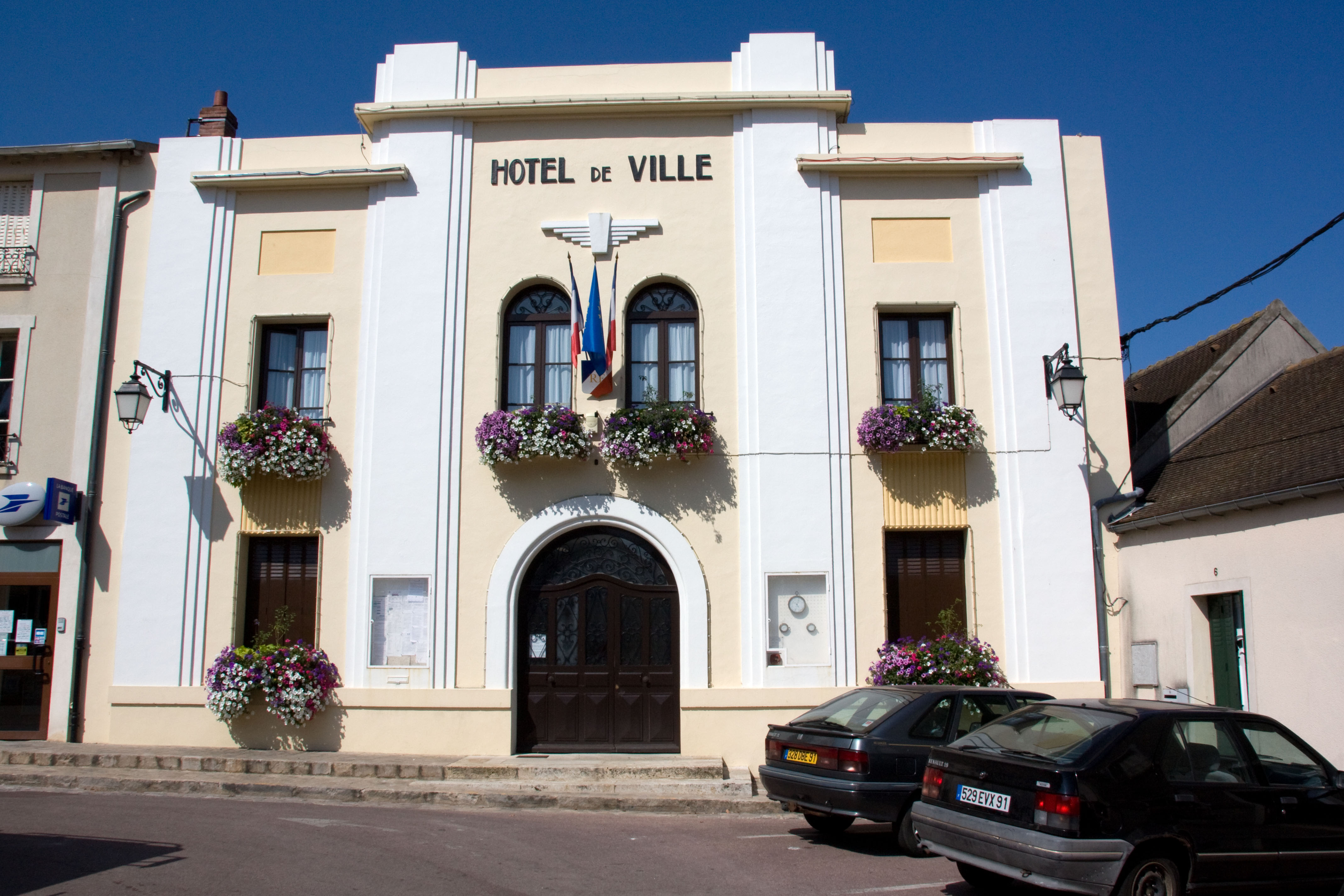
- The town hall in Maisse

- Coat of arms
- Location of Maisse
- Location within France Location within Île-de-France (region)
- Coordinates: 48°23′42″N 2°22′32″E
- Country: France
- Region: Île-de-France
- Department: Essonne
- Arrondissement: Évry
- Canton: Mennecy

Government
  - Mayor (2024–2026): Jean-Marc Lenglet
- Area^{1}: 21.58 km^{2} (8.33 sq mi)
- Highest elevation: 147 m (482 ft)
- Lowest elevation: 59 m (194 ft)
- Population (2023): 2,797
  - Density: 129.6/km^{2} (335.7/sq mi)
- Time zone: UTC+01:00 (CET)
  - Summer (DST): UTC+02:00 (CEST)
- INSEE/Postal code: 91359 /91720
- ^{1} French Land Register data, which excludes lakes, ponds, glaciers > 1 km^{2} (0.386 sq mi or 247 acres) and river estuaries.

Maisse (French pronunciation: [mɛs]) is a commune in the Essonne department in Île-de-France in northern France.

== Population ==
Historical population
Year	Pop.	±% p.a.
1968	1,385	—
1975	1,592	+2.01%
1982	1,945	+2.90%
1990	2,495	+3.16%
1999	2,622	+0.55%
2007	2,805	+0.85%
2012	2,703	−0.74%
2017	2,719	+0.12%
2023	2,797	+0.47%
Source: INSEE

Inhabitants of Maisse are known as Maissois in French.

== See also ==
- Communes of the Essonne department
