= Fontenay-le-Vicomte =

Commune in Île-de-France, France

- Commune
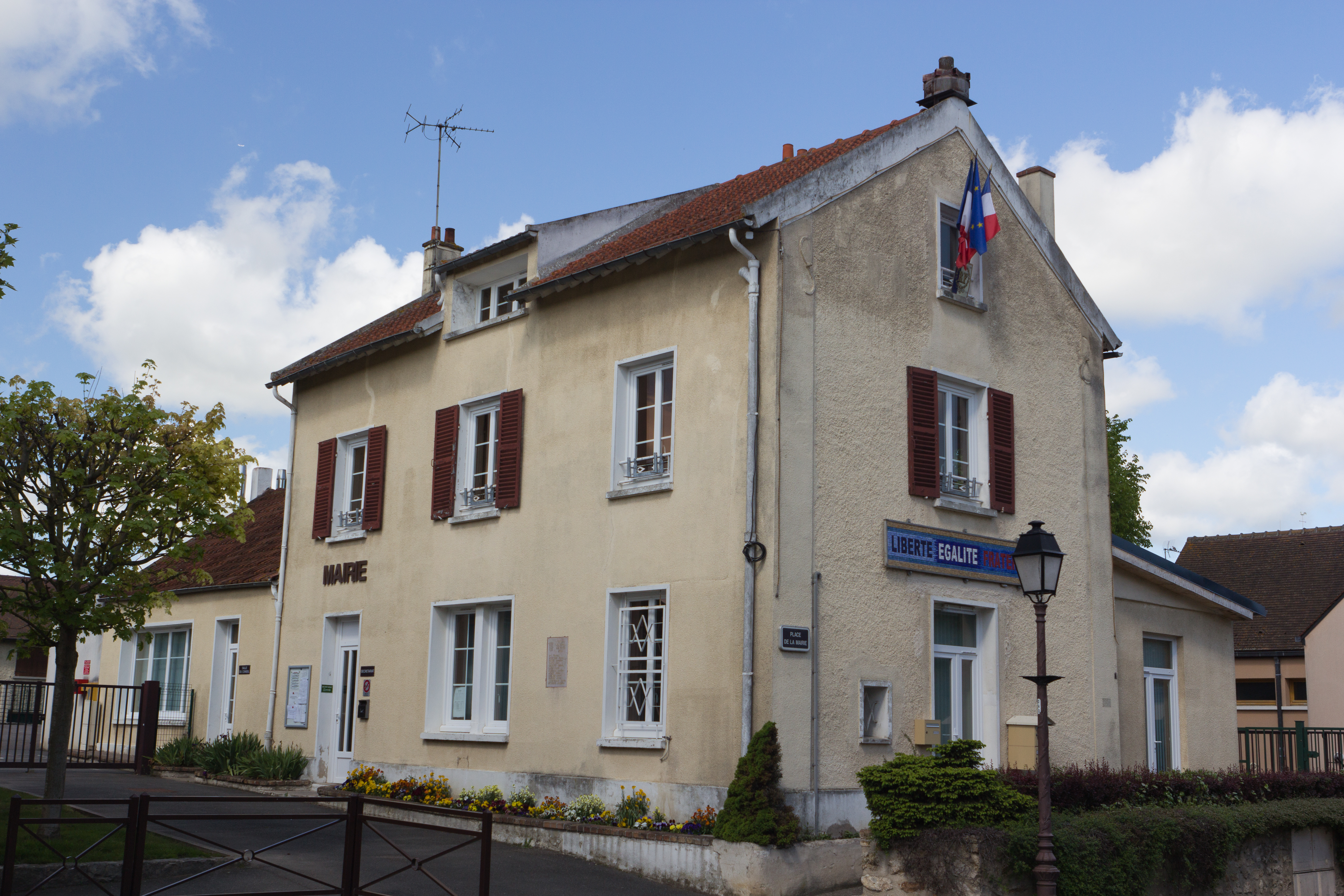
- The town hall of Fontenay-le-Vicomte

- Coat of arms
- Location of Fontenay-le-Vicomte
- Location within France Location within Île-de-France (region)
- Coordinates: 48°32′52″N 2°23′55″E
- Country: France
- Region: Île-de-France
- Department: Essonne
- Arrondissement: Évry
- Canton: Mennecy
- Intercommunality: Val d'Essonne

Government
  - Mayor (2020–2026): Valérie Mick Rives
- Area^{1}: 6.83 km^{2} (2.64 sq mi)
- Highest elevation: 84 m (276 ft)
- Lowest elevation: 46 m (151 ft)
- Population (2023): 1,596
  - Density: 234/km^{2} (605/sq mi)
- Time zone: UTC+01:00 (CET)
  - Summer (DST): UTC+02:00 (CEST)
- INSEE/Postal code: 91244 /91540
- ^{1} French Land Register data, which excludes lakes, ponds, glaciers > 1 km^{2} (0.386 sq mi or 247 acres) and river estuaries.

Fontenay-le-Vicomte (French pronunciation: [fɔ̃tnɛ lə vikɔ̃t]) is a commune in the Essonne department in Île-de-France in northern France.

Inhabitants of Fontenay-le-Vicomte are known as Fontenaysiens.

== See also ==
- Communes of the Essonne department
