= Ballancourt-sur-Essonne =

Commune in Île-de-France, France

- Commune
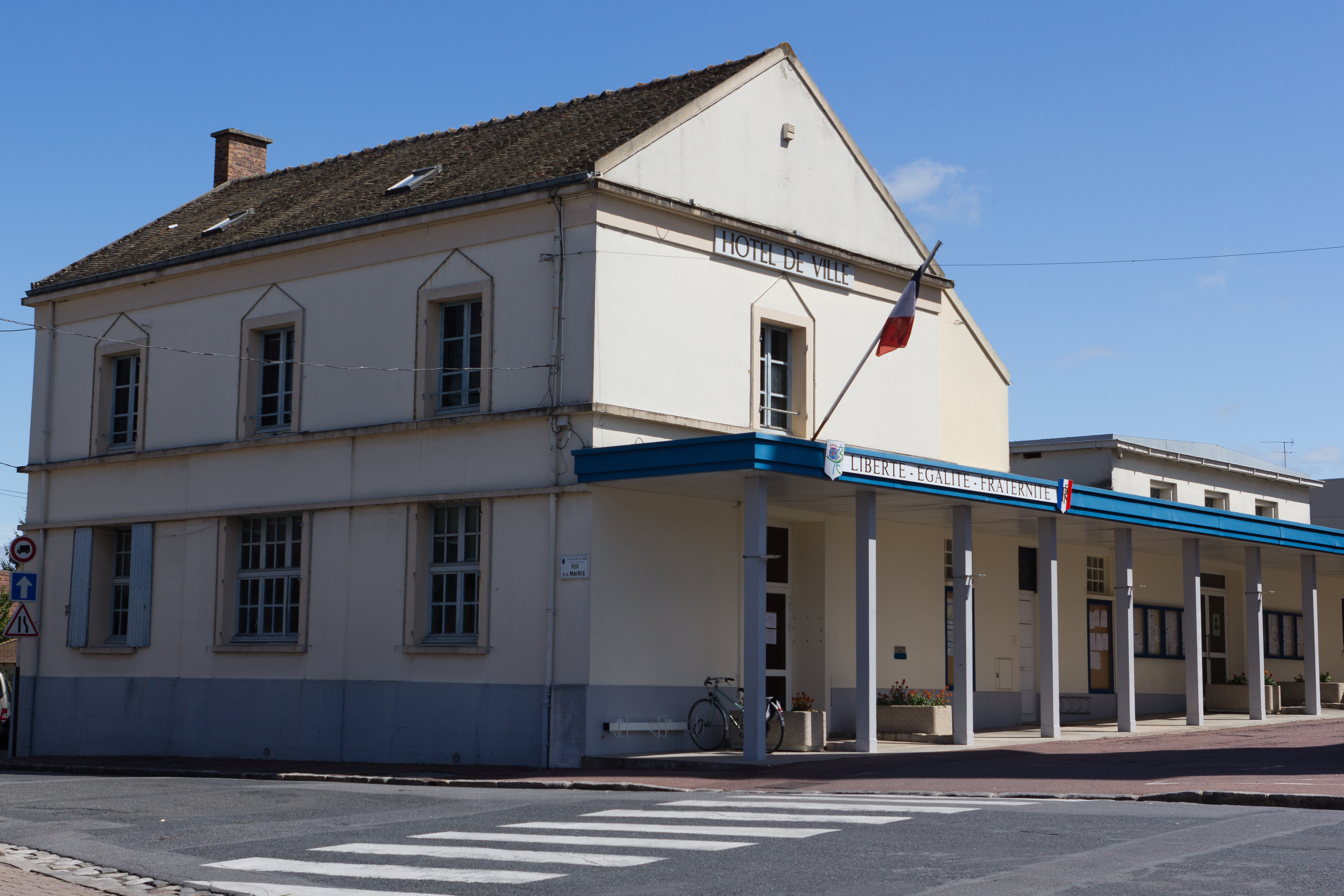
- The town hall of Ballancourt-sur-Essonne

- Coat of arms
- Location of Ballancourt-sur-Essonne
- Location within France Location within Île-de-France (region)
- Coordinates: 48°31′29″N 2°23′03″E
- Country: France
- Region: Île-de-France
- Department: Essonne
- Arrondissement: Évry
- Canton: Mennecy
- Intercommunality: Val d'Essonne

Government
  - Mayor (2020–2026): Jacques Mione
- Area^{1}: 11.30 km^{2} (4.36 sq mi)
- Highest elevation: 142 m (466 ft)
- Lowest elevation: 47 m (154 ft)
- Population (2023): 8,191
  - Density: 724.9/km^{2} (1,877/sq mi)
- Time zone: UTC+01:00 (CET)
  - Summer (DST): UTC+02:00 (CEST)
- INSEE/Postal code: 91045 /91610
- ^{1} French Land Register data, which excludes lakes, ponds, glaciers > 1 km^{2} (0.386 sq mi or 247 acres) and river estuaries.

Ballancourt-sur-Essonne (French pronunciation: [balɑ̃kuʁ syʁ ɛsɔn]; lit. 'Ballancourt-on-Essonne') is a commune in the Essonne department in Île-de-France in northern France.

== Geography ==
The Essonne forms the commune western border. Ballancourt-sur-Essonne is 37 kilometers south east of Paris-Notre-Dame, point zero from road of France, 13 kilometers south west of Évry, 5 kilometers north east of La Ferté-Alais, 12 kilometers south west of Corbeil-Essonnes, 12 kilometers south east of Arpajon, 15 kilometers south east of Montlhéry, 15 kilometers north west of Milly-la-Forêt, 20 kilometers north east of Étampes, 23 kilometers south east of Palaiseau, 27 kilometers east of Dourdan.

== Population ==
Inhabitants of Ballancourt-sur-Essonne are known as Ballancourtois in French.

Historical population
Year	Pop.	±% p.a.
1968	3,477	—
1975	5,025	+5.40%
1982	5,549	+1.43%
1990	6,174	+1.34%
1999	6,273	+0.18%
2007	7,206	+1.75%
2012	7,454	+0.68%
2017	7,597	+0.38%
2023	8,191	+1.26%
Source: INSEE

== Architectural heritage ==
- The 17th century Château du Saussay and its park were awarded historical monument on January 19, 1951.
- Father of the music rocks(Roches du père la Musique)
- Chapel Saint-Blaise
- Saint-Martin's church
- Maison et parc sauvage de Madame Chaumerdiac situés au 12, rue Pasteur

== See also ==
- Communes of the Essonne department
