= Courances =

Commune in Île-de-France, France

- Commune
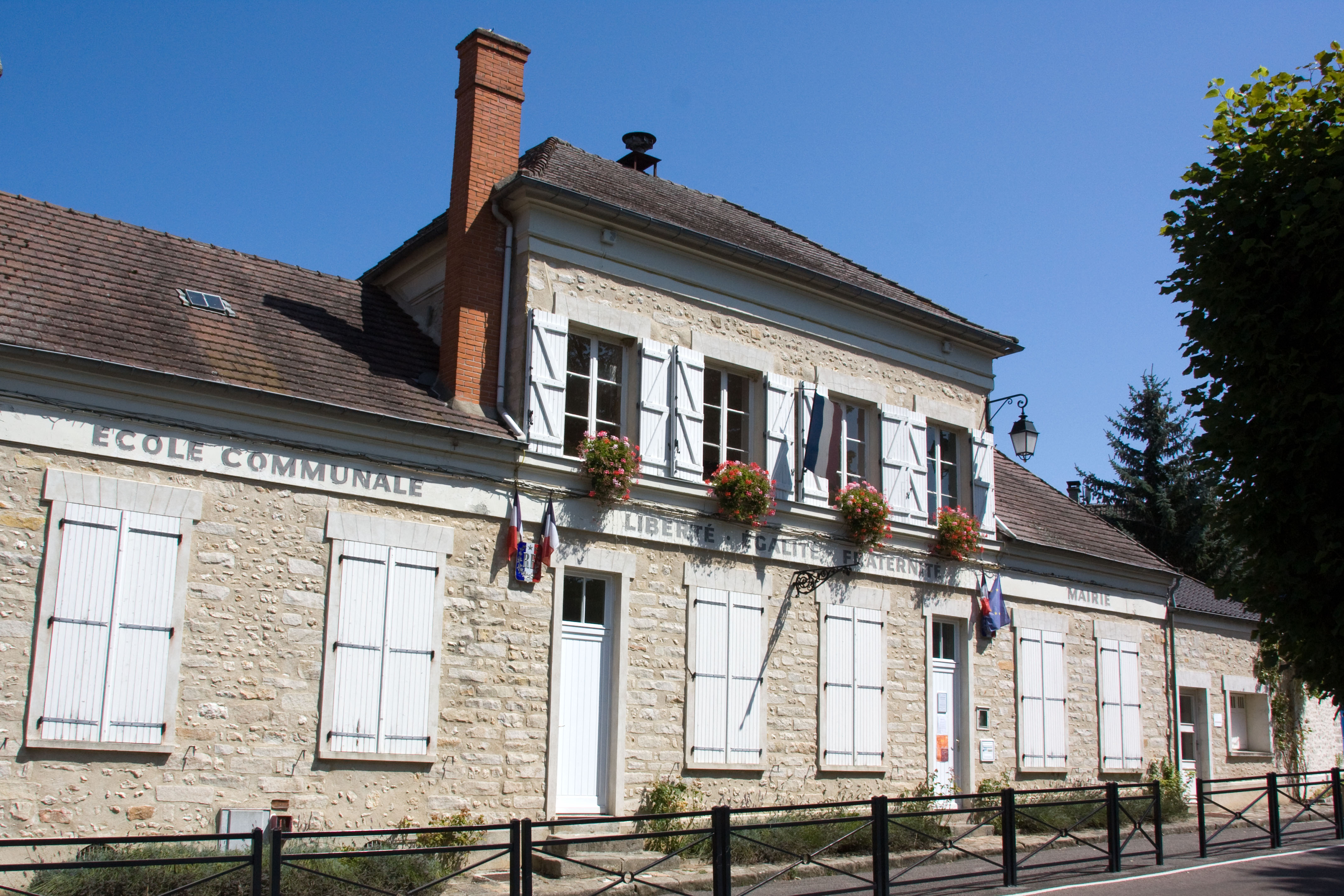
- The town hall of Courances
- Location of Courances
- Location within France Location within Île-de-France (region)
- Coordinates: 48°26′26″N 2°28′28″E
- Country: France
- Region: Île-de-France
- Department: Essonne
- Arrondissement: Évry
- Canton: Mennecy

Government
  - Mayor (2020–2026): Espérance Vieira
- Area^{1}: 8.31 km^{2} (3.21 sq mi)
- Highest elevation: 127 m (417 ft)
- Lowest elevation: 54 m (177 ft)
- Population (2023): 348
  - Density: 41.9/km^{2} (108/sq mi)
- Time zone: UTC+01:00 (CET)
  - Summer (DST): UTC+02:00 (CEST)
- INSEE/Postal code: 91180 /91490
- ^{1} French Land Register data, which excludes lakes, ponds, glaciers > 1 km^{2} (0.386 sq mi or 247 acres) and river estuaries.

Courances (French pronunciation: [kuʁɑ̃s]) is a commune in the Essonne department in Île-de-France in northern France.

Inhabitants of Courances are known as Courançois.

== See also ==
- Château de Courances
- Communes of the Essonne department
