= Prunay-sur-Essonne =

Commune in Île-de-France, France

- Commune
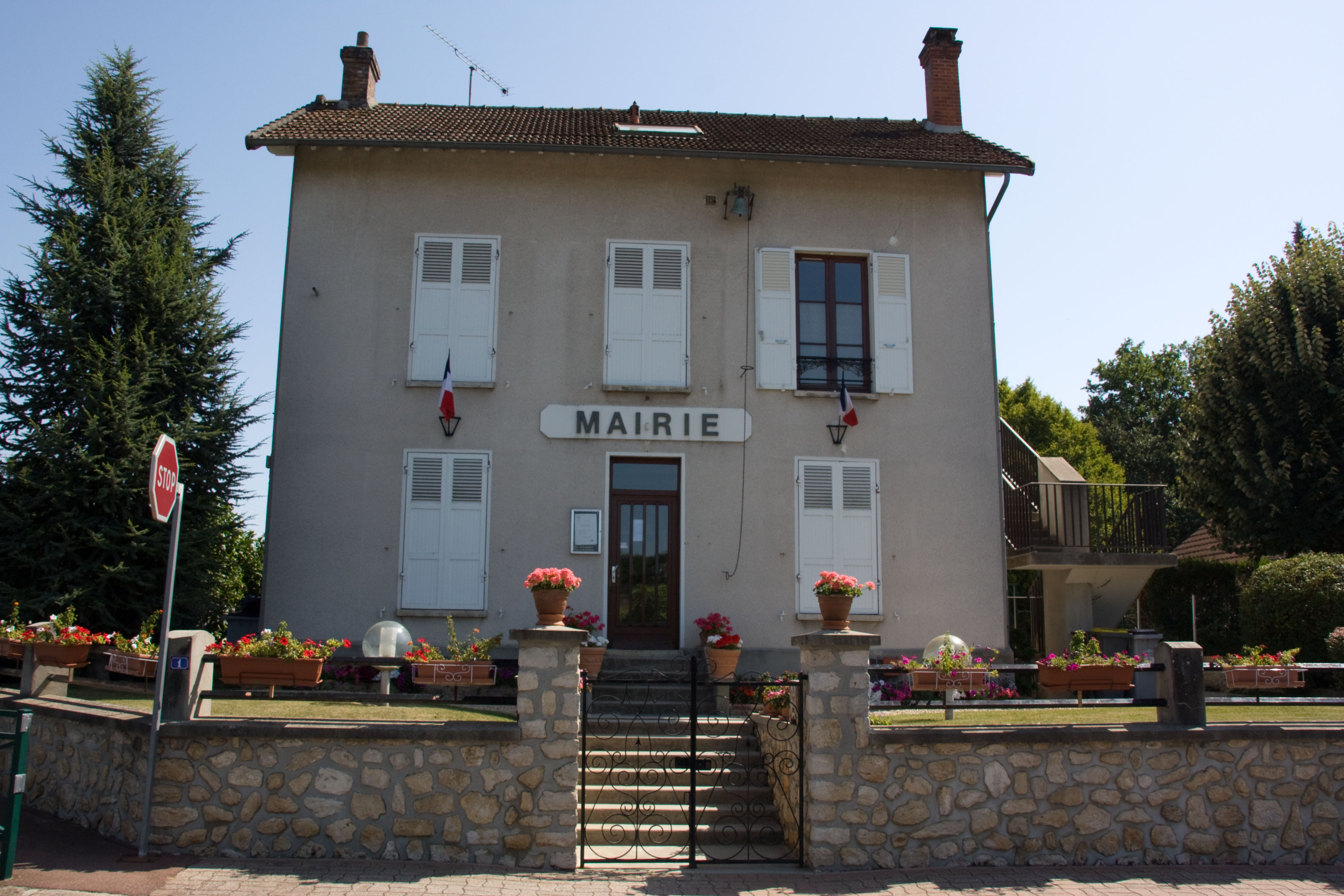
- The town hall in Prunay-sur-Essonne
- Location of Prunay-sur-Essonne
- Location within France Location within Île-de-France (region)
- Coordinates: 48°21′25″N 2°22′40″E
- Country: France
- Region: Île-de-France
- Department: Essonne
- Arrondissement: Évry
- Canton: Mennecy

Government
  - Mayor (2020–2026): Patrick Pagès
- Area^{1}: 5.14 km^{2} (1.98 sq mi)
- Highest elevation: 146 m (479 ft)
- Lowest elevation: 65 m (213 ft)
- Population (2023): 324
  - Density: 63.0/km^{2} (163/sq mi)
- Time zone: UTC+01:00 (CET)
  - Summer (DST): UTC+02:00 (CEST)
- INSEE/Postal code: 91507 /91720
- ^{1} French Land Register data, which excludes lakes, ponds, glaciers > 1 km^{2} (0.386 sq mi or 247 acres) and river estuaries.

Prunay-sur-Essonne (French pronunciation: [pʁynɛ syʁ ɛsɔn], literally Prunay on Essonne) is a commune in the Essonne department in Île-de-France in northern France.

Inhabitants of Prunay-sur-Essonne are known as Prunaysiens.

== See also ==
- Communes of the Essonne department
