= Moigny-sur-École =

Commune in Île-de-France, France

- Commune
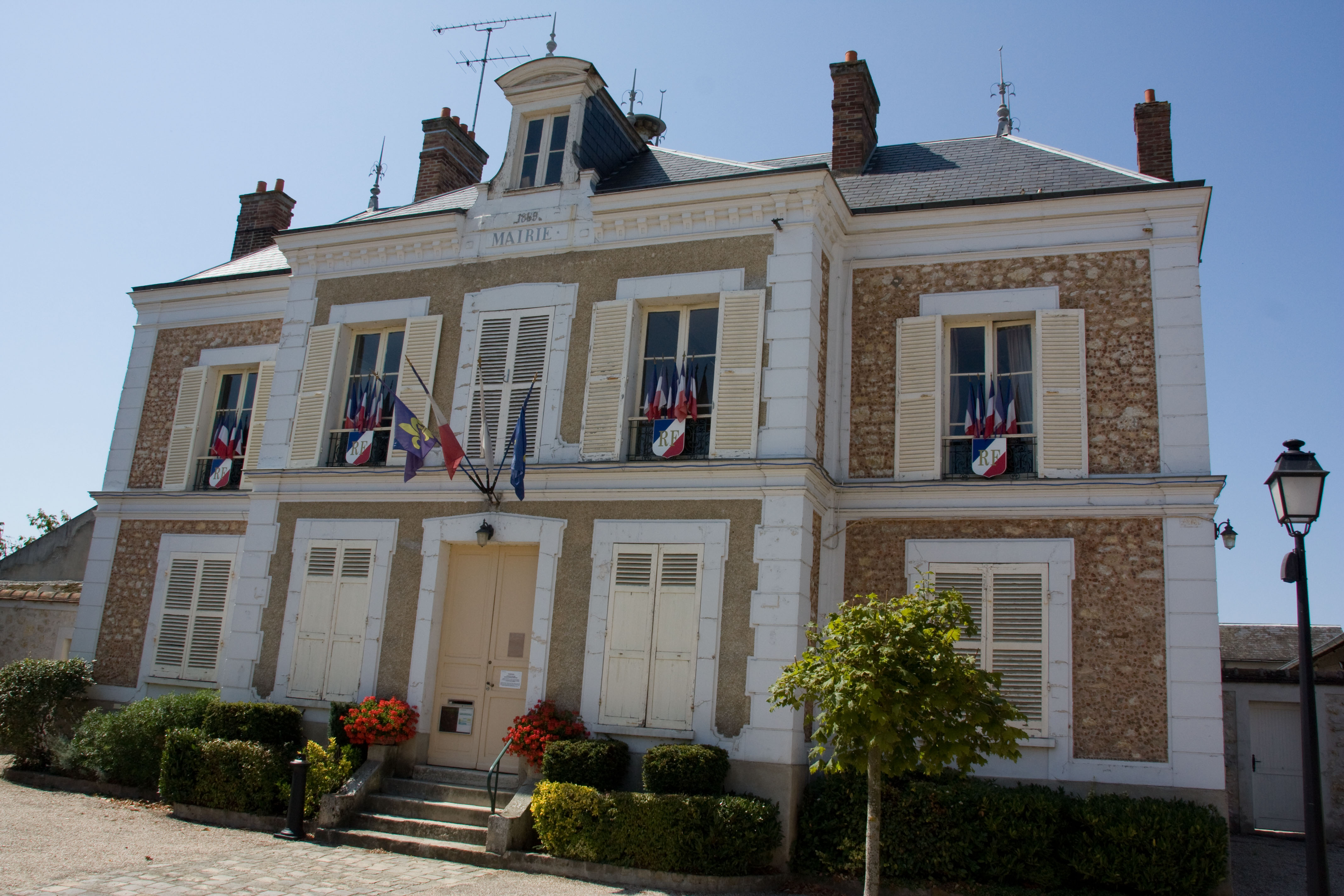
- The town hall in Moigny-sur-École

- Coat of arms
- Location of Moigny-sur-École
- Location within France Location within Île-de-France (region)
- Coordinates: 48°25′59″N 2°27′26″E
- Country: France
- Region: Île-de-France
- Department: Essonne
- Arrondissement: Évry
- Canton: Mennecy

Government
  - Mayor (2020–2026): Pascal Simonnot
- Area^{1}: 12.23 km^{2} (4.72 sq mi)
- Highest elevation: 144 m (472 ft)
- Lowest elevation: 57 m (187 ft)
- Population (2023): 1,294
  - Density: 105.8/km^{2} (274.0/sq mi)
- Time zone: UTC+01:00 (CET)
  - Summer (DST): UTC+02:00 (CEST)
- INSEE/Postal code: 91408 /91490
- ^{1} French Land Register data, which excludes lakes, ponds, glaciers > 1 km^{2} (0.386 sq mi or 247 acres) and river estuaries.

Moigny-sur-École (French pronunciation: [mwaɲi syʁ ekɔl]) is a commune in the Essonne department in Île-de-France in northern France.

Inhabitants of Moigny-sur-École are known as Moignacois.

== See also ==
- Communes of the Essonne department
