= Courdimanche-sur-Essonne =

Commune in Île-de-France, France

- Commune
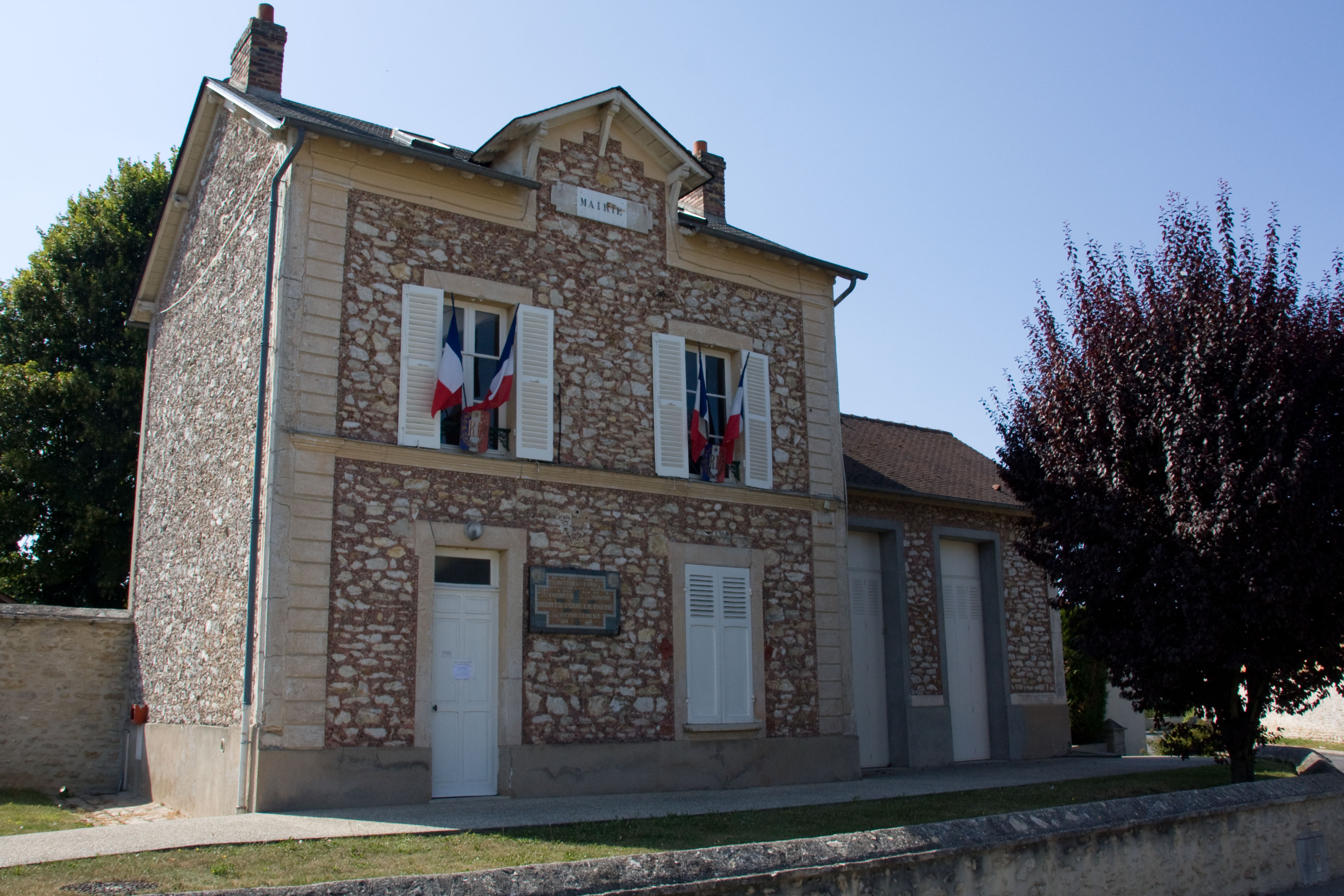
- The town hall of Courdimanche-sur-Essonne

- Coat of arms
- Location of Courdimanche-sur-Essonne
- Location within France Location within Île-de-France (region)
- Coordinates: 48°25′01″N 2°22′43″E
- Country: France
- Region: Île-de-France
- Department: Essonne
- Arrondissement: Évry
- Canton: Mennecy

Government
  - Mayor (2020–2026): Claude Duval
- Area^{1}: 5.62 km^{2} (2.17 sq mi)
- Highest elevation: 146 m (479 ft)
- Lowest elevation: 58 m (190 ft)
- Population (2023): 276
  - Density: 49.1/km^{2} (127/sq mi)
- Time zone: UTC+01:00 (CET)
  - Summer (DST): UTC+02:00 (CEST)
- INSEE/Postal code: 91184 /91720
- ^{1} French Land Register data, which excludes lakes, ponds, glaciers > 1 km^{2} (0.386 sq mi or 247 acres) and river estuaries.

Courdimanche-sur-Essonne (French pronunciation: [kuʁdimɑ̃ʃ syʁ ɛsɔn]; lit. 'Courdimanche-on-Essonne') is a commune in the Essonne department in Île-de-France in northern France.

Inhabitants of Courdimanche-sur-Essonne are known as Courdimanchois.

== Geography ==
=== Climate ===
Courdimanche-sur-Essonne has an oceanic climate (Köppen climate classification Cfb). The average annual temperature in Courdimanche-sur-Essonne is 11.6 °C (52.9 °F). The average annual rainfall is 594.8 mm (23.42 in) with May as the wettest month. The temperatures are highest on average in July, at around 19.8 °C (67.6 °F), and lowest in January, at around 4.3 °C (39.7 °F). The highest temperature ever recorded in Courdimanche-sur-Essonne was 42.1 °C (107.8 °F) on 25 July 2019; the coldest temperature ever recorded was −14.6 °C (5.7 °F) on 8 January 2010.

Climate data for Courdimanche-sur-Essonne (1991−2020 normals, extremes 1989−present)
Month	Jan	Feb	Mar	Apr	May	Jun	Jul	Aug	Sep	Oct	Nov	Dec	Year
Record high °C (°F)	15.8 (60.4)	21.2 (70.2)	25.4 (77.7)	28.9 (84.0)	32.5 (90.5)	38.1 (100.6)	42.1 (107.8)	40.5 (104.9)	35.0 (95.0)	28.7 (83.7)	22.1 (71.8)	17.3 (63.1)	42.1 (107.8)
Mean daily maximum °C (°F)	7.2 (45.0)	8.5 (47.3)	12.8 (55.0)	16.2 (61.2)	19.7 (67.5)	23.4 (74.1)	26.3 (79.3)	26.0 (78.8)	21.9 (71.4)	16.7 (62.1)	11.0 (51.8)	7.7 (45.9)	16.4 (61.5)
Daily mean °C (°F)	4.3 (39.7)	4.8 (40.6)	7.8 (46.0)	10.5 (50.9)	14.1 (57.4)	17.5 (63.5)	19.8 (67.6)	19.5 (67.1)	15.9 (60.6)	12.1 (53.8)	7.5 (45.5)	4.8 (40.6)	11.6 (52.9)
Mean daily minimum °C (°F)	1.4 (34.5)	1.0 (33.8)	2.8 (37.0)	4.7 (40.5)	8.4 (47.1)	11.5 (52.7)	13.4 (56.1)	13.0 (55.4)	9.8 (49.6)	7.6 (45.7)	4.1 (39.4)	1.9 (35.4)	6.6 (43.9)
Record low °C (°F)	−14.6 (5.7)	−13.2 (8.2)	−12.4 (9.7)	−6.4 (20.5)	−2.1 (28.2)	0.5 (32.9)	4.8 (40.6)	3.6 (38.5)	0.3 (32.5)	−3.9 (25.0)	−11.5 (11.3)	−10.5 (13.1)	−14.6 (5.7)
Average precipitation mm (inches)	44.6 (1.76)	42.1 (1.66)	43.5 (1.71)	43.2 (1.70)	62.4 (2.46)	56.2 (2.21)	47.4 (1.87)	49.1 (1.93)	45.7 (1.80)	54.7 (2.15)	50.8 (2.00)	55.1 (2.17)	594.8 (23.42)
Average precipitation days (≥ 1.0 mm)	10.1	9.7	8.9	8.4	9.6	8.5	6.6	7.1	7.1	9.9	10.0	10.9	106.8
Source: Météo-France

== See also ==
- Communes of the Essonne department
