= Mennecy =

Commune in Île-de-France, France

- Commune
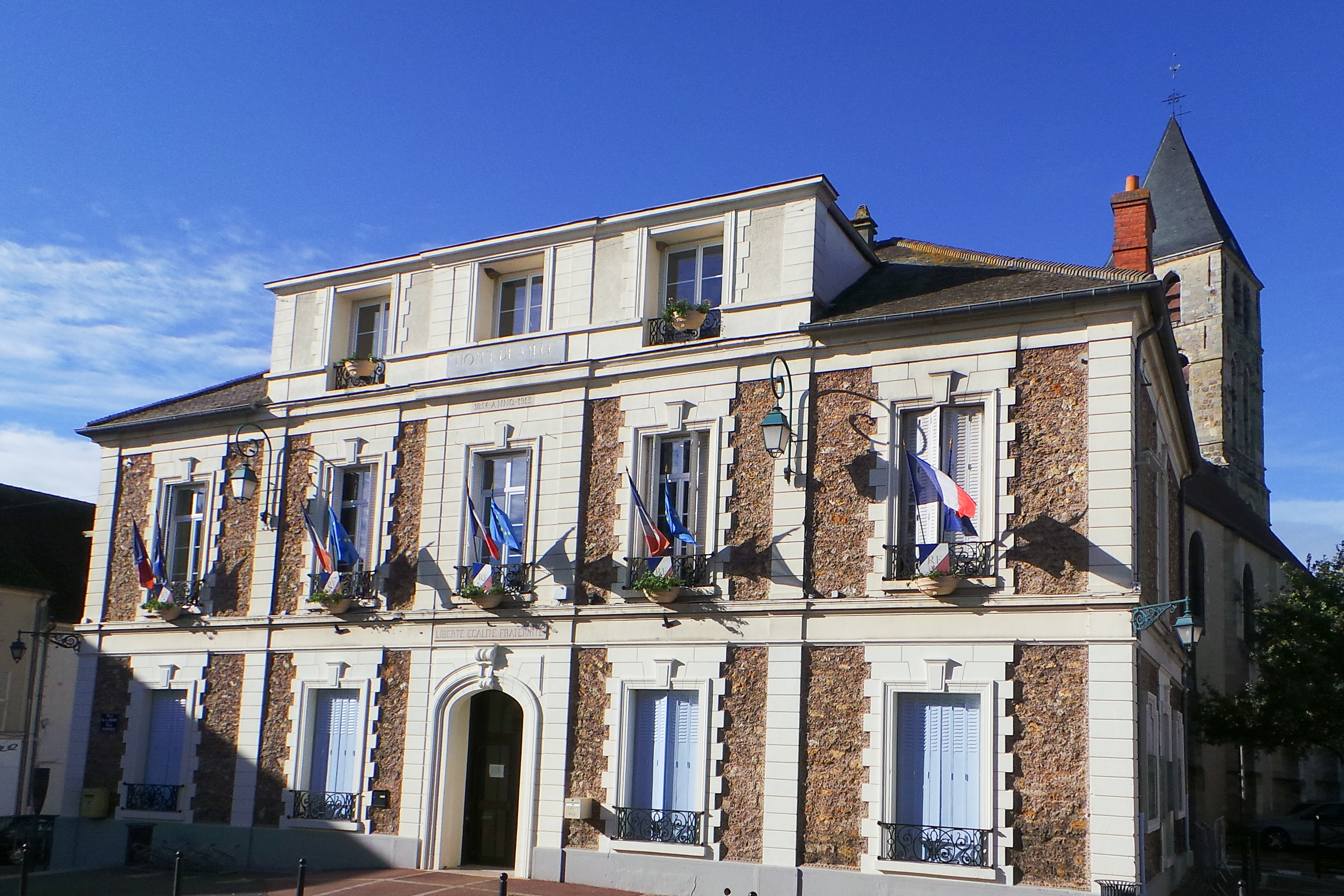
- The town hall in Mennecy

- Coat of arms
- Location of Mennecy
- Location within France Location within Île-de-France (region)
- Coordinates: 48°33′58″N 2°26′13″E
- Country: France
- Region: Île-de-France
- Department: Essonne
- Arrondissement: Évry
- Canton: Mennecy
- Intercommunality: Val d'Essonne

Government
  - Mayor (2020–2026): Jean-Philippe Dugoin-Clément
- Area^{1}: 11.09 km^{2} (4.28 sq mi)
- Highest elevation: 97 m (318 ft)
- Lowest elevation: 42 m (138 ft)
- Population (2023): 16,433
  - Density: 1,482/km^{2} (3,838/sq mi)
- Time zone: UTC+01:00 (CET)
  - Summer (DST): UTC+02:00 (CEST)
- INSEE/Postal code: 91386 /91540
- ^{1} French Land Register data, which excludes lakes, ponds, glaciers > 1 km^{2} (0.386 sq mi or 247 acres) and river estuaries.

Mennecy (French pronunciation: [mɛnsi]) is a commune in the Essonne department in Île-de-France in northern France.

== Geography ==
Mennecy is 33 kilometers south east of Paris-Notre-Dame, point zero from roads of France, 8 kilometers south of Évry, 6 kilometers south west of Corbeil-Essonnes, 11 kilometers north east of La Ferté-Alais, 14 kilometers east of Arpajon, 15 kilometers south east of Montlhéry, 19 kilometers north of Milly-la-Forêt, 22 kilometers south east of Palaiseau, 25 kilometers north east of Étampes, 31 kilometers north east of Dourdan. It is crossed by the river Essonne.

== Population ==
Inhabitants of Mennecy are known as Menneçois in French.

Historical population
Year	Pop.	±% p.a.
1968	3,867	—
1975	7,644	+10.22%
1982	10,702	+4.92%
1990	11,048	+0.40%
1999	12,779	+1.63%
2007	13,225	+0.43%
2012	13,127	−0.15%
2017	14,319	+1.75%
2023	16,433	+2.32%
Source: INSEE

== Twin towns ==
Mennecy is twinned with the villages Countesthorpe in Leicestershire, United Kingdom, Occhiobello in Italy and Renningen in Baden-Württemberg, Germany.

== See also ==
- Communes of the Essonne department
