= Jean Gagé =

French historian and professor (1902–1986)

- Born: 1 June 1902; Nainville-les-Roches
- Died: 4 May 1986 (aged 83)
- Occupation: Historian

Jean Gagé (1 June 1902 – 4 May 1986) was a French historian who specialised in ancient Roman history.

From 1921 to 1924, Jean Gagé was a student at the École normale supérieure in Paris and obtained his agrégation de lettres. He was a member of the École française de Rome from 1925 until 1928, years in which he participated in excavations in Algeria. He was sent to a teaching assignment in São Paulo, where he remained during World War II. He returned to France in 1945 and settled in Strasbourg. In 1955, he defended his thesis at the Sorbonne, then was appointed a professor at the Collège de France, succeeding André Piganiol as the chair of Roman civilisation, where he taught until 1972.

== Selected works ==
- 1963: Nocturnes et méridiennes; winner of the Académie Française's Prix Paul Verlaine.
- 1964: Les Classes sociales dans l'Empire romain - Payot
- 1965: La Montée des Perses Sassanides et l'heure de Palmyre - Albin Michel
- 1976: La Chute des Tarquins et les débuts de la République romaine - Payot; winner of the Académie Française's Prix Broquette-Gonin for literature.
