= Canton of Mennecy =

Coordinates: 48.56°N 2.43°E

The canton of Mennecy is an administrative division of the Essonne department, Île-de-France region, northern France. Its borders were modified at the French canton reorganisation which came into effect in March 2015. Its seat is in Mennecy.

It consists of the following communes:

1. Auvernaux
2. Ballancourt-sur-Essonne
3. Baulne
4. Boigneville
5. Boutigny-sur-Essonne
6. Buno-Bonnevaux
7. Champcueil
8. Chevannes
9. Le Coudray-Montceaux
10. Courances
11. Courdimanche-sur-Essonne
12. Dannemois
13. La Ferté-Alais
14. Fontenay-le-Vicomte
15. Gironville-sur-Essonne
16. Guigneville-sur-Essonne
17. Itteville
18. Maisse
19. Mennecy
20. Milly-la-Forêt
21. Moigny-sur-École
22. Mondeville
23. Nainville-les-Roches
24. Oncy-sur-École
25. Ormoy
26. Prunay-sur-Essonne
27. Soisy-sur-École
28. Videlles
