= Ormoy, Essonne =

Commune in Île-de-France, France

Ormoy
- Commune
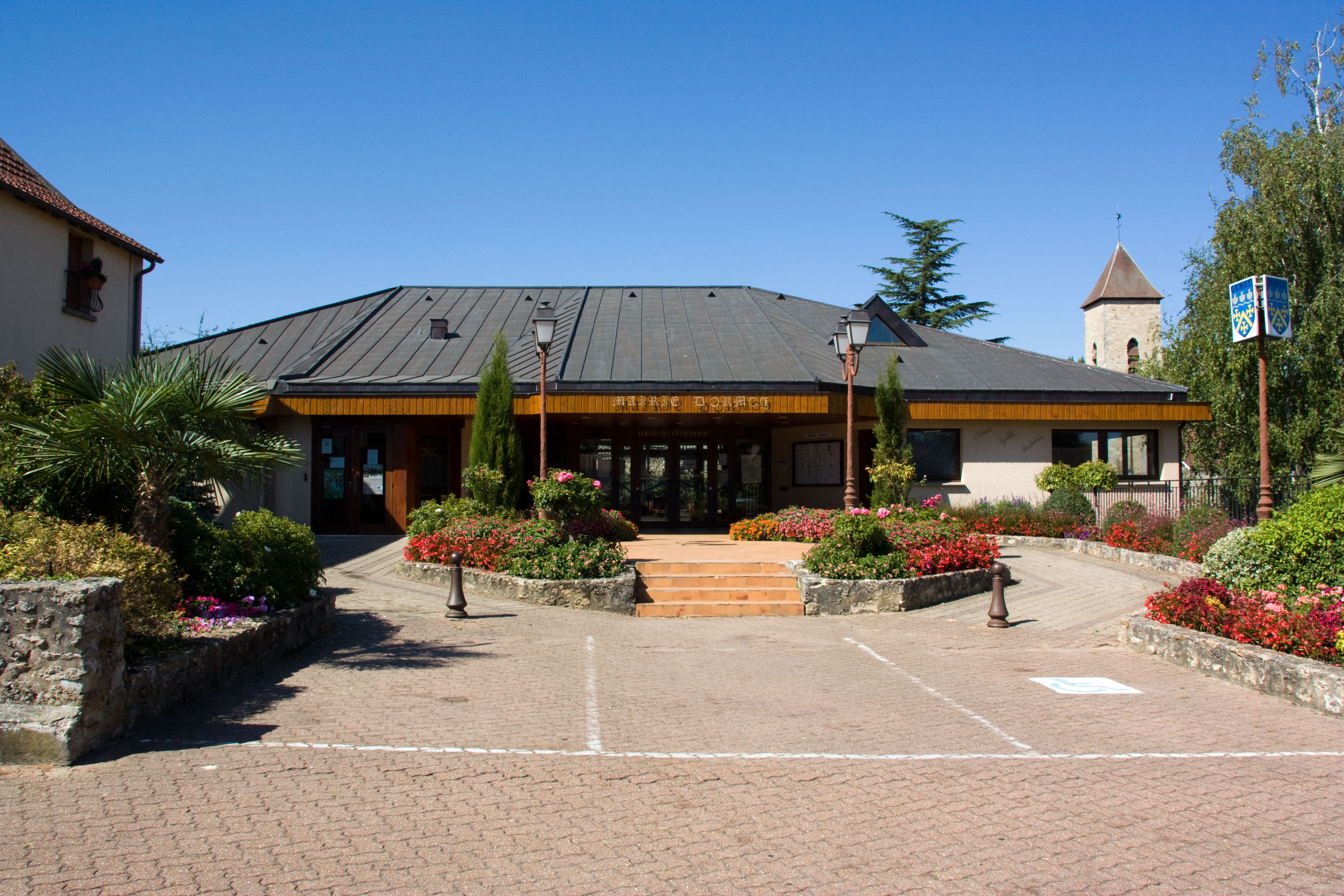
- The town hall in Ormoy

- Coat of arms
- Location of Ormoy
- Location within France Location within Île-de-France (region)
- Coordinates: 48°34′34″N 2°26′48″E
- Country: France
- Region: Île-de-France
- Department: Essonne
- Arrondissement: Évry
- Canton: Mennecy
- Intercommunality: Val d'Essonne

Government
  - Mayor (2020–2026): Jacques Gombault
- Area^{1}: 1.88 km^{2} (0.73 sq mi)
- Highest elevation: 88 m (289 ft)
- Lowest elevation: 42 m (138 ft)
- Population (2023): 3,225
  - Density: 1,720/km^{2} (4,440/sq mi)
- Time zone: UTC+01:00 (CET)
  - Summer (DST): UTC+02:00 (CEST)
- INSEE/Postal code: 91468 /91540
- ^{1} French Land Register data, which excludes lakes, ponds, glaciers > 1 km^{2} (0.386 sq mi or 247 acres) and river estuaries.

Ormoy (French pronunciation: [ɔʁmwa]) is a commune in the Essonne department in Île-de-France in northern France.

== Population ==
Historical population
| Year | Pop. | ±% p.a. |
|---|---|---|
| 1968 | 448 | — |
| 1975 | 708 | +6.76% |
| 1982 | 715 | +0.14% |
| 1990 | 904 | +2.98% |
| 1999 | 1,241 | +3.58% |
| 2007 | 1,746 | +4.36% |
| 2012 | 1,929 | +2.01% |
| 2017 | 2,046 | +1.18% |
| 2023 | 3,225 | +7.88% |
Source: INSEE

Inhabitants of Ormoy are known as Ulméens in French.

== See also ==
- Communes of the Essonne department
