= Peter Maturin =

Irish Anglican cleric

Peter Maturin was an Anglican priest in Ireland during the 18th century.

Maturin was educated at Trinity College, Dublin. He was appointed a prebendary of Rosserkbeg in Killala Cathedral in 1722; and was Dean of Killala from 1724 until 1741. He was also Vicar-general of the Diocese of Killala and Achonry.
