= Cletus Mathurin =

Saint Lucian cricketer (born 1982)

Personal information
- Full name: Cletus Mathurin
- Born: 26 April 1982 (age 44); Saint Lucia
- Batting: Right-handed
- Bowling: Right-arm medium-fast
- Role: Opening batsman

Domestic team information
- Years: Team
- 2008: Saint Lucia
- Source: CricketArchive, May 11 2016

Cletus Mathurin (birth April 26, 1982, St Lucia) is a former Saint Lucian cricketer who played for the Saint Lucia national cricket team in Stanford 20/20 in West Indian domestic cricket. He played as a right-handed opening batsman as well as right-arm medium-fast bowler.
