= Soisy-sur-École =

Commune in Île-de-France, France

- Commune
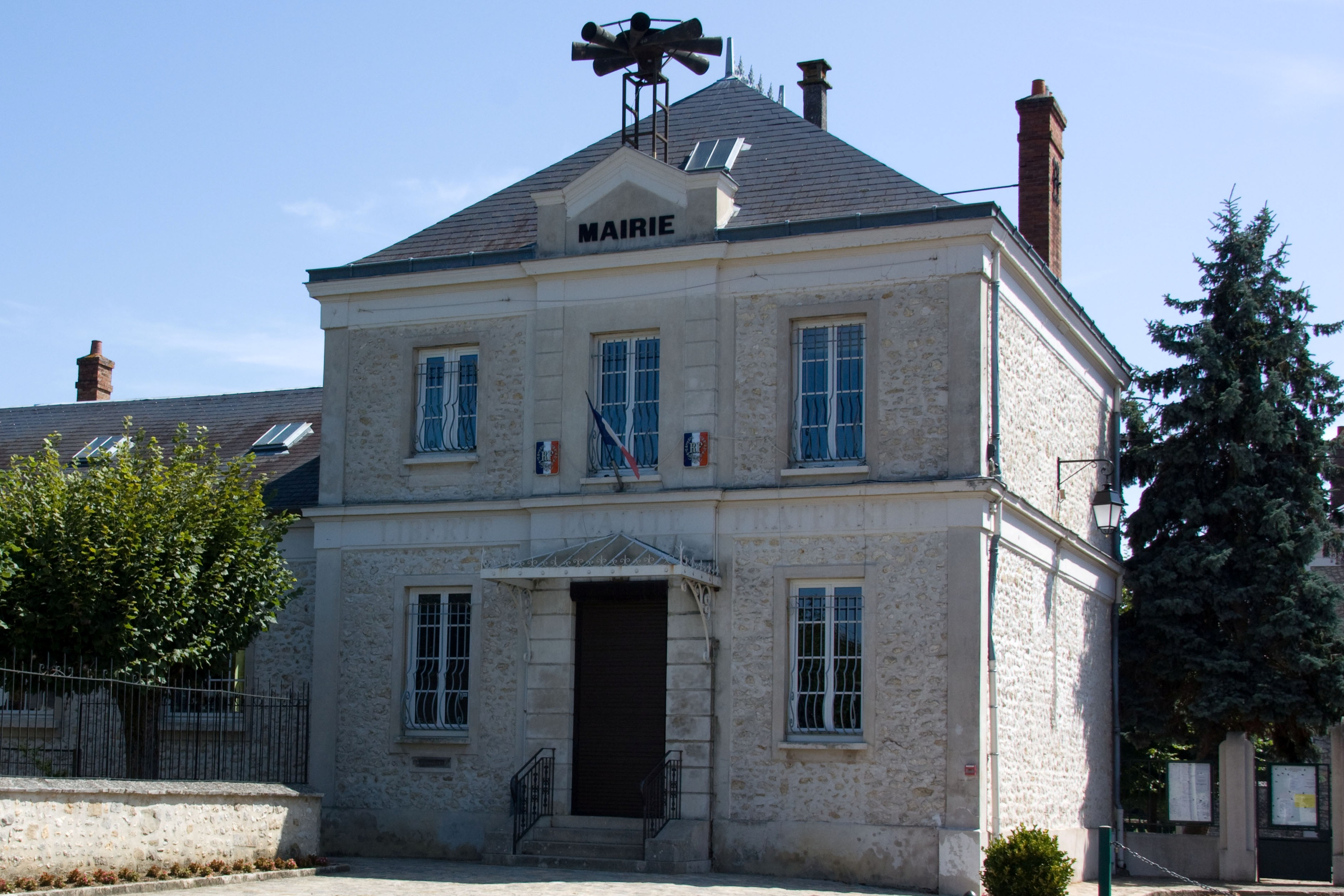
- The town hall in Soisy-sur-École

- Coat of arms
- Location of Soisy-sur-École
- Location within France Location within Île-de-France (region)
- Coordinates: 48°28′29″N 2°29′50″E
- Country: France
- Region: Île-de-France
- Department: Essonne
- Arrondissement: Évry
- Canton: Mennecy
- Intercommunality: CC des 2 Vallées

Government
  - Mayor (2024–2026): Franck Lefèvre
- Area^{1}: 11.52 km^{2} (4.45 sq mi)
- Highest elevation: 144 m (472 ft)
- Lowest elevation: 48 m (157 ft)
- Population (2023): 1,174
  - Density: 101.9/km^{2} (263.9/sq mi)
- Time zone: UTC+01:00 (CET)
  - Summer (DST): UTC+02:00 (CEST)
- INSEE/Postal code: 91599 /91840
- ^{1} French Land Register data, which excludes lakes, ponds, glaciers > 1 km^{2} (0.386 sq mi or 247 acres) and river estuaries.

Soisy-sur-École (French pronunciation: [swazi syʁ ekɔl]) is a commune in the Essonne department in Île-de-France in northern France. It is 44 kilometres (27 mi) southeast of Paris. Inhabitants of Soisy-sur-École are known as Soiséens.

== Origin of village name ==
Known under the name of Sosio between 1108–1120, from Sosiaco around 1140, and Soisiacum around 1350. The place was called Soisiacum juxta scolam in 1118. The commune was created in 1793 under the name of Soisy sur Ecolle. The name was introduced in the law bulletin in 1801.

== Architectural heritage ==
- Soisy-sur-École streets are narrow, sinuous and surrounded by stoneware houses.
- Soisy-sur-École is surrounded with small farms. Montaquoi is located on a mound. It is a little hamlet within the village. It is basically a huge farm and house closed to it. It is a place out of time and appreciated by television producers who chose it as a background.
- Saint Aignan church is dated from 10th century. It was refurbished in the 1980. Its stained glass window with warm colors give a spiritual and warm feeling to its visitors.
- The glassmaking art is culturally attractive place from Soisy-sur-École. Glassworker masters and other glassblower make high quality products.

== See also ==
- Communes of the Essonne department
