= Simon Mathurin Lantara =

French painter (1729–1778)

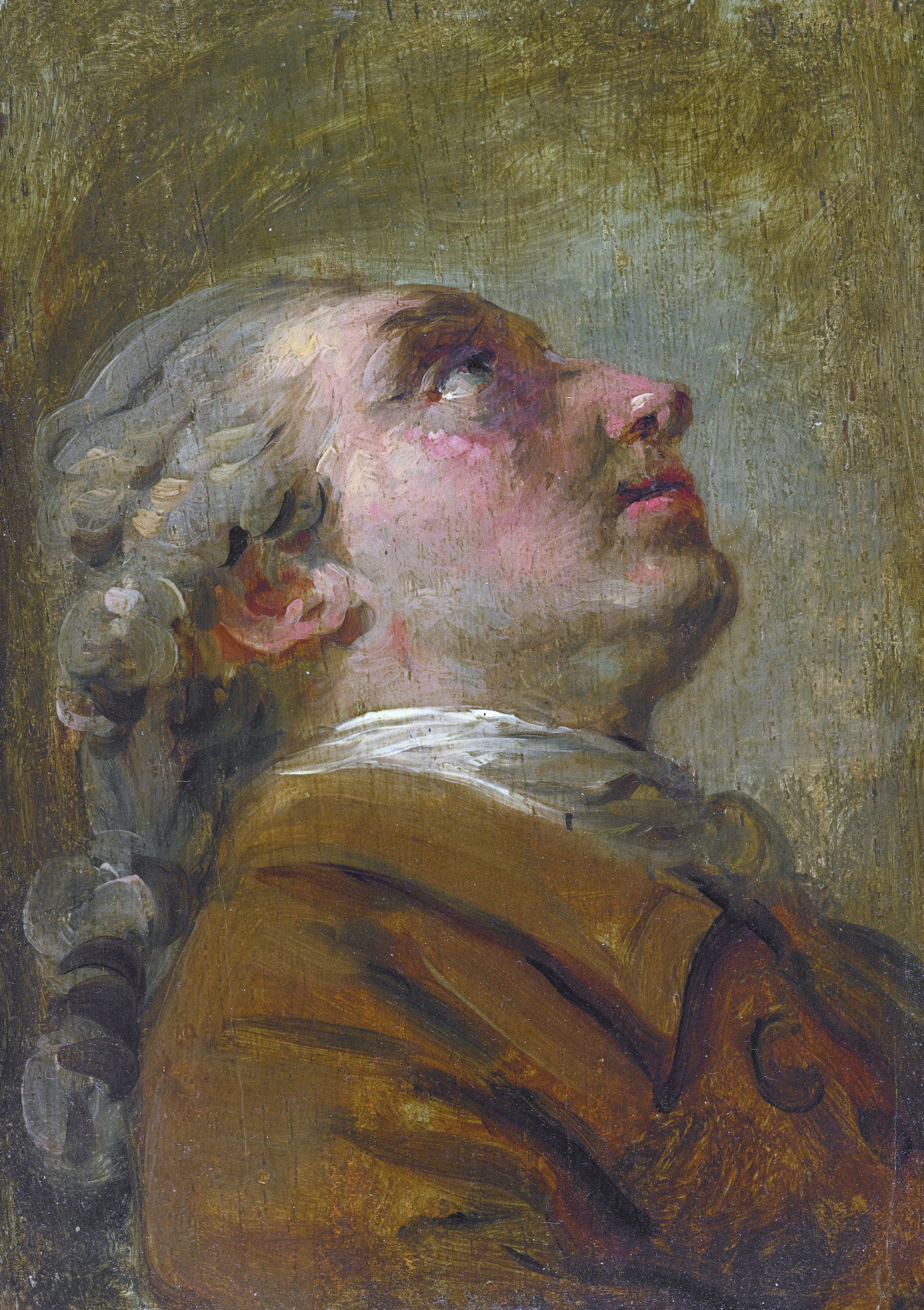
- Simon Mathurin Lantara by Claude-Joseph Vernet
- Born: 24 March 1729; Oncy-sur-École, France
- Died: 22 December 1778 (aged 49); Paris, France
- Occupation: Landscape painter
- Notable work: Morning (1761)

Simon Mathurin Lantara (24 March 1729 – 22 December 1778) was a French landscape painter.

He was born at Oncy. His father was a weaver, and he himself began life as a herdboy; but, having attracted the notice of Gille de Reumont, a son of his master, he was placed under a painter at Versailles. Endowed with great facility and real talent, his powers found ready recognition; but he found the constraint of a regular life and the society of educated people unbearably tiresome; and as long as the proceeds of the last sale lasted he lived careless of the future in the company of obscure workmen. Rich amateurs more than once attracted him to their houses, only to find that in ease and high living Lantara could produce nothing. He died in Paris in 1778.

His works are prized, but lacking in number; the Louvre has one landscape, Morning, signed and dated 1761. Émile Bernard, Joseph Vernet, and others are said to have added figures to his landscapes and sea-pieces. Engravings after Lantara will be found in the works of Lebas, Piquenot, Duret, Mouchy and others. In 1809 a comedy called Lantara, or the Painter in the Pothouse, was brought out at the Vaudeville with great success.

See Émile Bellier de la Chavignerie, Recherches sur le peintre Lantara (Paris, 1852).
