= Liss =

Liss, Lyss or LISS may refer to

- Liss (band), a Danish musical group
- Liss (name), a given name and surname
- Liss, Hampshire, a village in England
  - West Liss, the oldest part of Liss village
  - Liss Forest, a hamlet near Liss
  - Liss Athletic F.C., a semi-professional football club based in Liss
  - Liss railway station, on the Portsmouth Direct Line
  - Liss Forest Road railway station, a former station on the Longmoor Military Railway
- LISS panel (Longitudinal Internet Studies for the Social sciences), Netherlands
- Liss, a fictional town in stories of Russian writer Alexander Grin
- Lyss, a municipality in Switzerland

== See also ==
- Lyce, an Amazon named by Valerius Flaccus
- Lisse, a town and municipality in the Netherlands
- Lisses, a commune in France
- Lice (disambiguation)
- Lis (disambiguation)
- Lys (disambiguation)
- M'Liss (disambiguation)
