= LIS =

LIS, LiS or Lis may refer to:

== Computing ==
- LIS (programming language)
- Lis (linear algebra library), library of iterative solvers for linear systems
- Laboratory information system, databases oriented towards medical laboratories
- Land information system, land mapping and cadastre GIS used by local governments
- Language-independent specification, a programming language specification
- Legume Information System, online resources and exploratory tools for legume researchers and breeders
- Linear Integrated Systems, American manufacturer of semiconductors
- Local information systems, collect, store, and disseminate information about small geographic areas
- Location information server, provides location information
- Longest increasing subsequence, algorithm to find the longest increasing subsequence in an array of numbers

== Science ==
- Laser Isotope Separation, a means of producing enriched uranium from uranium ore
- Lateral internal sphincterotomy, an operation for the treatment of chronic anal fissure
- Lightning Imaging Sensor, an instrument on the TRMM satellite and on the International Space Station
- Liquid-impregnated surface
- Locked-in syndrome, a type of paralysis
- Library and information science

== Other ==
- Lis (given name)
- Lis (surname)
- Lis River, a river in Portugal
- Lis coat of arms, of Polish Clan Lis
- Lis, Albania, in the Mat municipality of Dibër County
- Italian Sign Language (Lingua dei Segni Italiana)
- Lughat al-Ishāra al-Sūriyya, the Modern Standard Arabic name for Syrian Levantine Sign
- League and Self-Defense, a 2007 Polish political coalition
- Life Is Strange (series), a series of episodic graphic adventure games.
  - Life Is Strange (2015 video game)
- Lithium-sulphur battery (Li-S)
- Locate in Scotland (1981–2001), replaced by Scottish Development International
- London Interdisciplinary School, university in London, England
- Lisbon Airport, Portugal, IATA code

== See also ==
- Lisse, a town and municipality in the Netherlands
- Lisses, a commune in France
- Lyce, an Amazon named by Valerius Flaccus
- Lice (disambiguation)
- Liss (disambiguation)
- Lys (disambiguation)
