= Lys =

Lys or LYS may refer to:

== Places ==
- Les Lys, a Premier cru vineyard in Chablis
- Lyon–Saint-Exupéry Airport, France (by IATA code)
- Lys (department), a département during the First French Empire, now in Belgium
- Lys (Dora Baltea), a stream of Aosta Valley in Italy
- Lys (river), a river in France and Belgium
- Lys, Nièvre, a commune in the Nièvre department in France
- Lys, Pyrénées-Atlantiques, a commune in the Pyrénées-Atlantiques department in France
- Lys, an old orthography of Liss, Hampshire, England

== Science ==
- Lys (or K), an abbreviation for the amino acid lysine
- Plural form of the symbol for light-years

== People ==
- Lys (surname)
- Lys Assia (1924–2018), Swiss singer
- Lys Mouithys (born 1985), Congolese football player

== Other uses ==
- Battle of the Lys (1918), a battle of World War I in France in the spring of 1918
- Fleur-de-lys or Fleur-de-lis, a stylized representation of a lily or iris, used in heraldry
- Lisans Yerleştirme Sınavı (Student Selection and Placement System), a standardized test for admission to higher education in Turkey
- LYS (sailing), a sailing handicapping system
- Lys, a key town in Arthur C. Clarke's 1956 book The City and the Stars
- Lys, a city-state in George R.R. Martin's novels A Song of Ice and Fire

== See also ==
- Lyce, an Amazon named by Valerius Flaccus
- Lisse, a town and municipality in the Netherlands
- Lisses, a commune in France
- Lice (disambiguation)
- Lis (disambiguation)
- Liss (disambiguation)
