= Lice (disambiguation) =

Lice are wingless insects.

Lice may also refer to:

- Lice infestations, or pediculosis, an infectious disease
- Lice, Turkey, a district of Diyarbakır Province in Turkey
- Lice Mountain, in Kosovo
- Lice (The Office), an episode of TV series The Office
- Lice (film), an upcoming American horror film starring Emile Hirsch
- Lice (novel) (La Main coupée), a 1946 novel by Blaise Cendrars, published in English as Lice in 1973 and The Bloody Hand in 2014
- Gate lice, aircraft passengers unnecessarily gathering in front of boarding gates
- Lice (duo), a hip-hop musical collaboration between Aesop Rock and Homeboy Sandman
- Lice Chamorro (born 1998), Paraguayan footballer
- Lice Waqaliti, Fijian footballer
- Stjepan Lice, Croatian jurist, poet, essayist and columnist

== See also ==
- Louse (disambiguation)
- Lyce, an Amazon named by Valerius Flaccus
- Lisse, a town and municipality in the Netherlands
- Lisses, a commune in France
- Lis (disambiguation)
- Liss (disambiguation)
- Lys (disambiguation)
