= Louse (disambiguation) =

A louse is a wingless insect.

Louse may also refer to:

== Insects and other arthropods ==
- Gill louse, Ergasilus, a genus of parasitic copepod crustaceans
- Hog louse (disambiguation)
- Sea louse, the Caligidae, a family of ectoparasitic marine copepods
- Whale louse, the Cyamidae, a family of parasitic amphipod crustaceans
- Woodlouse, the Oniscidea, a suborder of terrestrial isopod crustaceans

== Other uses ==
- Stone louse, a fictitious animal created by the humorist Loriot
- Louse Creek (disambiguation), various streams in the United States

== See also ==
- Lice (disambiguation)
- Laos
