= Liss (name) =

Liss is a surname and a given name.

== People ==
=== Liss as a surname ===
- Andrzej Liss (1950–2019), Polish politician
- David Liss (born 1966), American writer of novels, essays and short fiction
- Dmitry Liss (born 1960), Russian music conductor
- Ignacy Liss (born 1998), Polish actor
- Johann Liss (c. 1590–1630), German painter
- Klaus-Dieter Liss (born 1962), German-Australian physicist
- Lesia Liss (born 1966), American politician
- Lucas Liss (born 1992), German cyclist
- Peter Liss (born 1942), British environmental scientist

=== Liss as a given name ===
- Liss Eriksson (1919–2000), Swedish sculptor
- Liss Platt (born 1965), Canadian video artist
- Liss Schanche, Norwegian politician
