= Plestor House =

Plestor House may refer to:

- Plestor House, Selborne
- Plestor House, Liss
