= David Greetham =

David Greetham may refer to:

- David Greetham (cricketer)
- David Greetham (textual scholar)
