= Lys (surname) =

Lys is a surname with various origins. It is particularly common in Ukraine and France. The Ukrainian surname (Лис) means "fox" and is a cognate of Polish Lis.

Notable people with the surname include:

- Eva Lys (born 2002), German tennis player
- Francis John Lys (1863–1947), British academic
- Jan Lys or Johann Liss (c. 1590–1629), German painter
- Josephine Lys, pen name of Maria José López Sánchez, Spanish novelist
- Lya Lys (1908–1986), American actress
- Olena Lys (born 1971), Ukrainian politician
