= Boarding (transport) =

Entry of passengers onto a vehicle

Boarding is the entry of passengers onto a vehicle, usually in public transportation. Boarding starts with entering the vehicle and ends with the seating of each passenger and closing the doors. The term is used in road, rail, water and air transport (for example, passengers board a coach).

== Aviation ==
At commercial airports, a boarding call on the public announcement system asks travelers to proceed to the departure gate and board the aircraft. This can begin any time from an hour to thirty minutes before departure (depending on the size of the plane and number of passengers). For boarding an aircraft, airstairs or jetways are used. Small aircraft may carry their own stairs.

Airlines control the access to the aircraft by checking passengers' boarding passes and matching them with the list of passengers and their identification cards. Many airlines use the IATA standard Bar Coded Boarding Passes (BCBP) to automate this process. A 2D bar code is scanned and the data are sent to the airline's system to look up the list of passengers. If the passenger is entitled to board, a positive message is sent back to the airline agent.

Boarding in air travel is supervised by ground personnel. The pilot is responsible for the boarding as soon as the doors are closed because by law the aircraft is then "in flight".

After boarding, the taxiing and takeoff will follow in most cases.

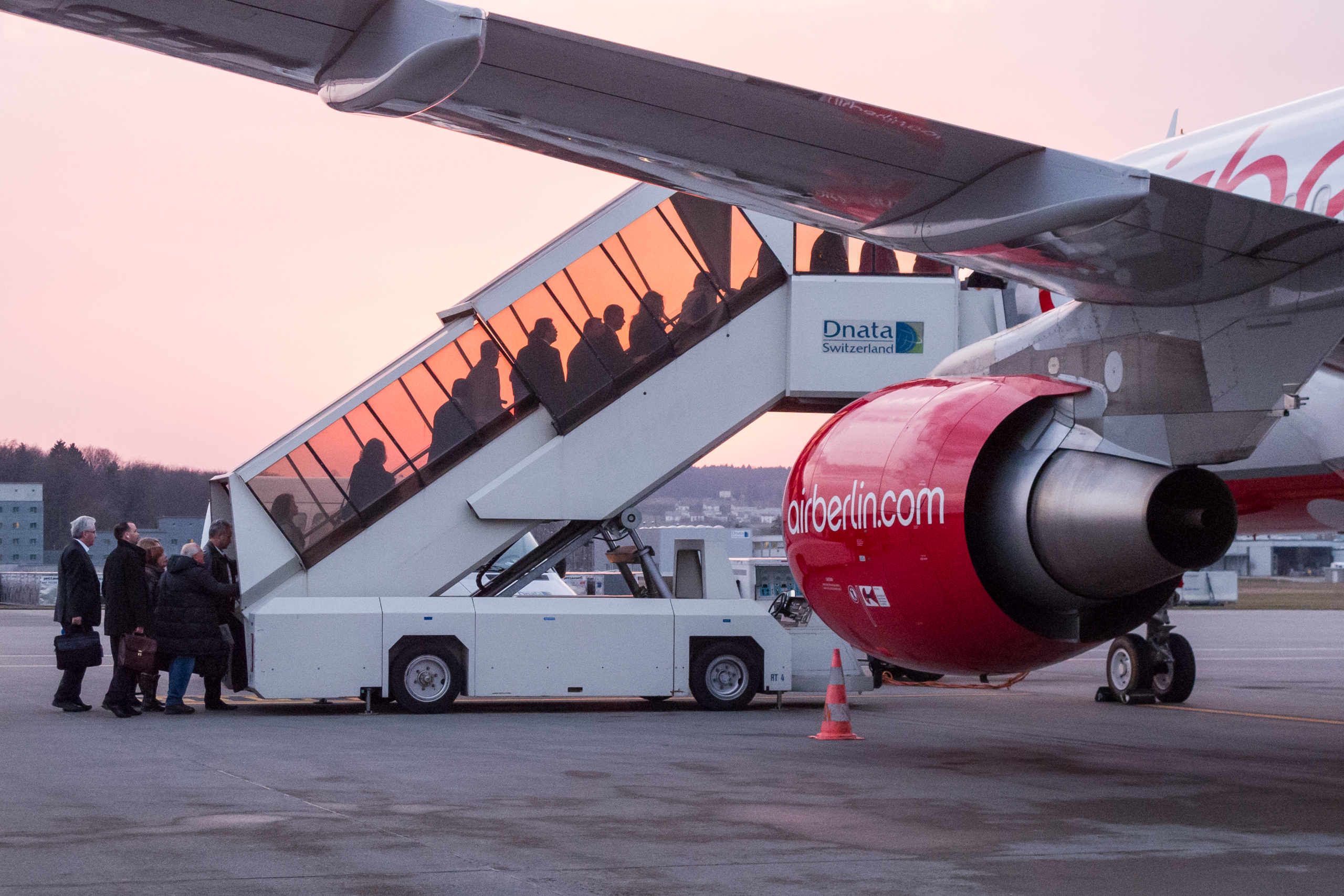
Boarding with mobile gangway in Zurich, 2011

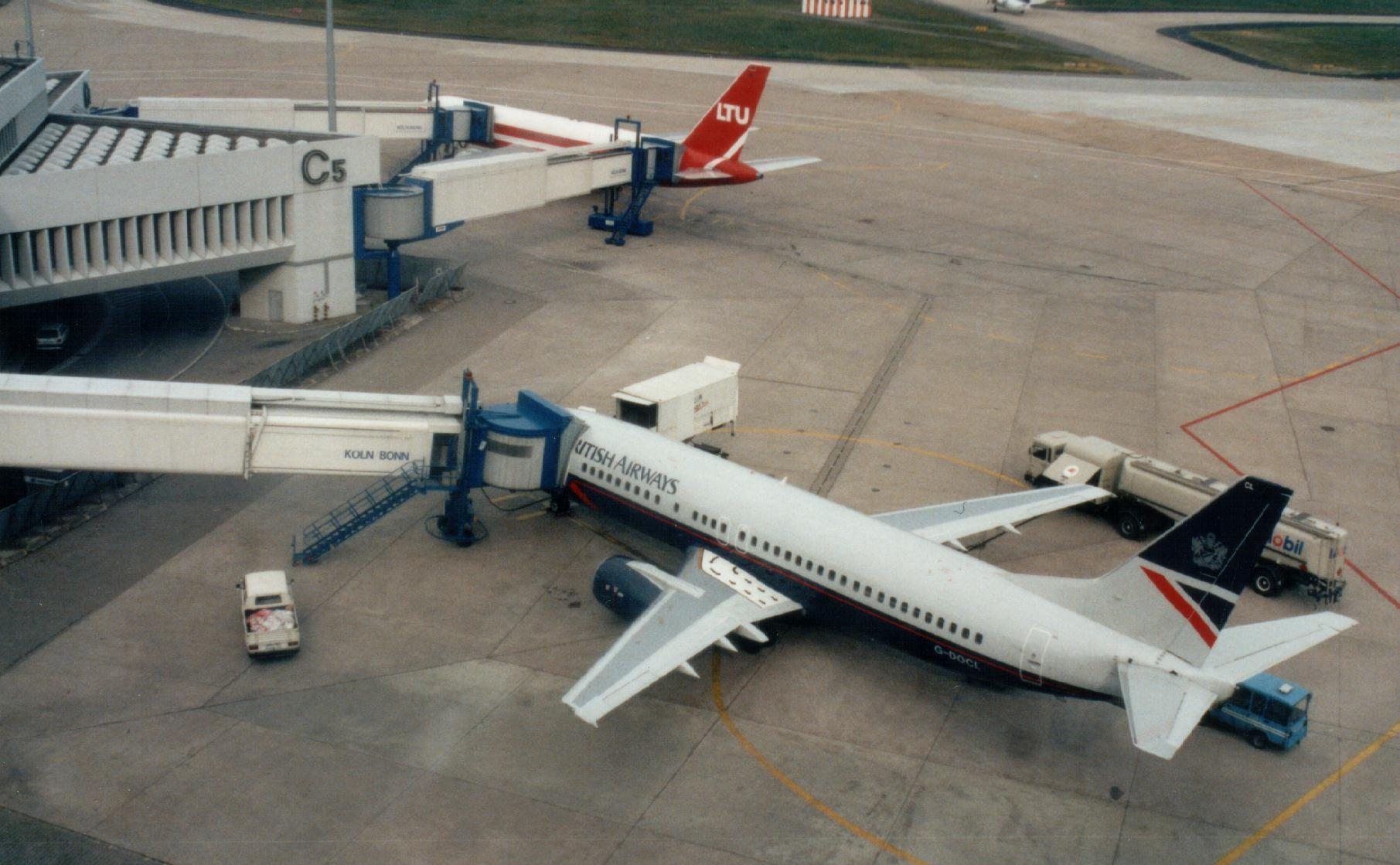
Boarding bridge to an aircraft via a jetway at the Cologne Bonn Airport in 2001.

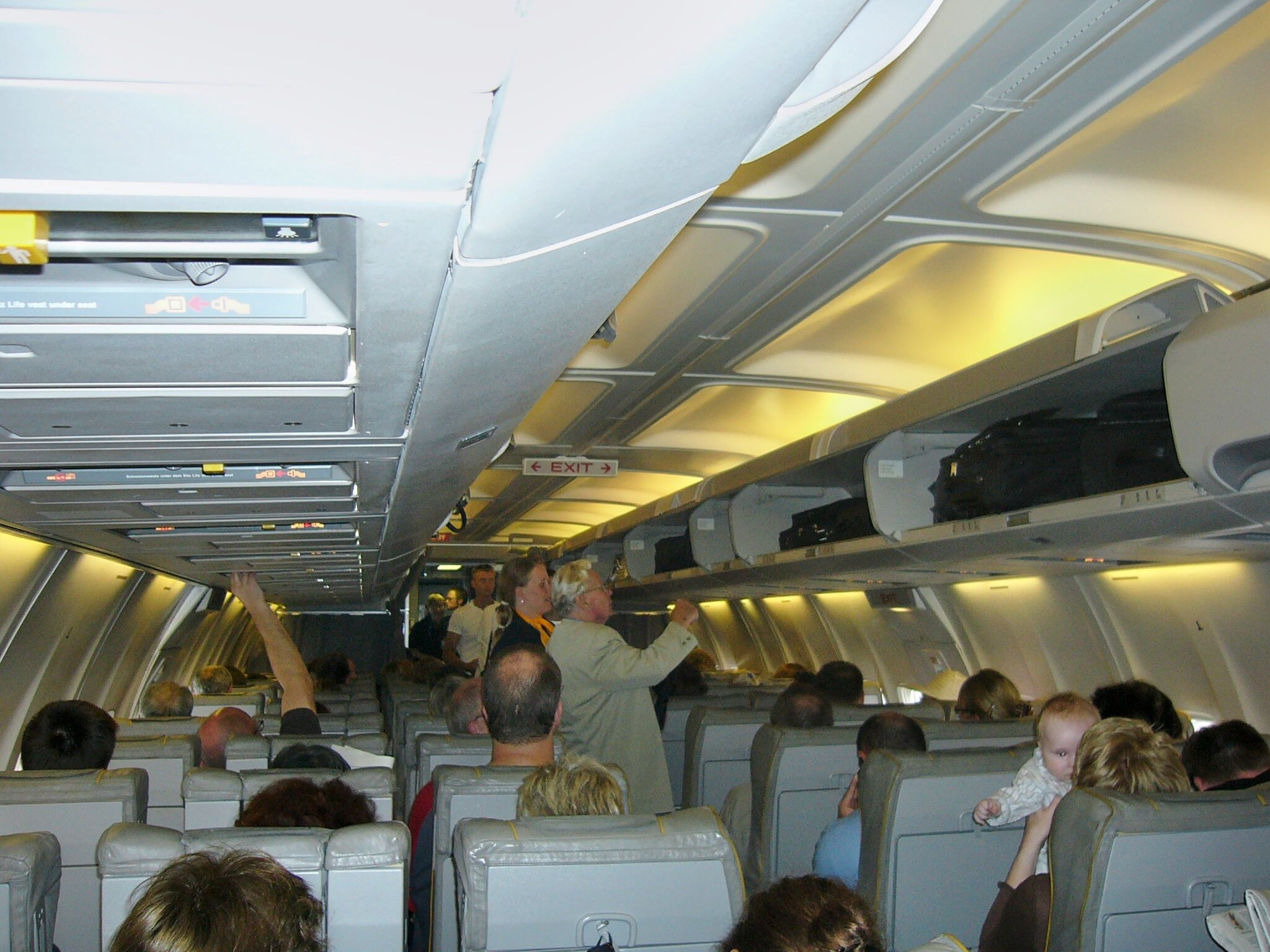
Having boarded, passengers stow their cabin baggage - Lufthansa Boeing 737-500.

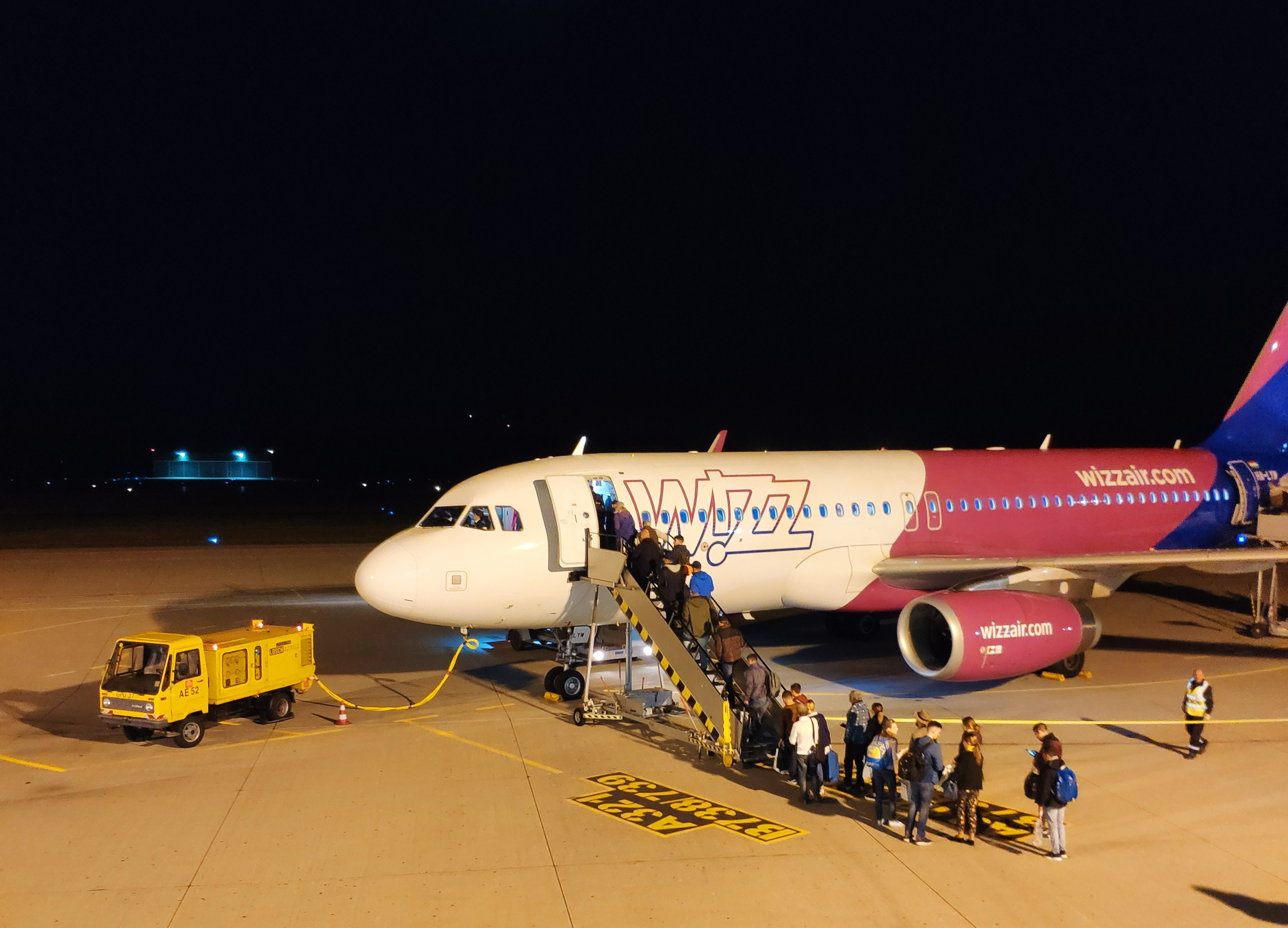
Boarding to low cost airline in Memminger in 2019.

=== Boarding patterns and efficiency ===
Most North American airlines have assigned seating, but Southwest Airlines does not. Southwest boards passengers in A, B, and C number groups depending on their ticket purchase date. Across North American airlines, it is standard to allow early boarding for passengers with mobility impairments, those with small children, and first class passengers. All airlines allow passengers in premium cabins or with elite status to board earlier, with some offering it to coach customers for a fee.

Several boarding patterns by seating location are possible:

- Back-to-front by row
- Outside-in by column (window, middle, aisle = "Wilma")
- Block boarding (outside-in within a zone, with zones ordered back-to-front)
- Reverse pyramid (combines back-to-front with outside-in)
- Rotating zone (alternating back-to-front and front-to-back segments)
- Random

Efficiency considerations to minimize overall boarding time include:

- Whether passengers have to wait to pass other passengers in the aisle
- Whether passengers have to cross already-seated passengers in aisle and middle seats
- How many people can be storing luggage and taking their seats at the same time

Competing considerations include:

- Encouraging specific behaviors (paying more, self-service, checking in earlier, buying earlier)
- Whether families and friends can board together
- Passenger stress with regard to who gets what seat and competition for overhead bin space

Computer simulations indicate that the outside-in and reverse-pyramid patterns should be fastest, followed by block and random, followed by back-to-front and rotating zone. American Airlines found in a two-year study that randomized boarding was faster than outside-in. Despite this, most North American airlines use the back-to-front pattern.

Another proposed method to speed boarding is to have passengers sort themselves by row and seat while still standing in the waiting area.

Television series MythBusters examined various boarding techniques in their 2014 episode "Plane Boarding" and found the standard back-to-front system to be the slowest among the tested.

At the gate, the term "gate lice" has been applied to passengers who cluster around the boarding area prior to their designated time to board.

=== Pre-boarding ===
As the process of controlling and verifying boarding passes and identity documents takes non-negligible amounts of time and as some airlines aim to reduce turnaround times, the process of "pre boarding" is increasingly employed. In this process, passengers enter a separate area after having their boarding pass inspected before the plane is ready to be boarded and once actual boarding commences passengers simply enter the plane.

== Water transport ==
In water transport a boarding onto a watercraft can be done while it is located moored or anchored.

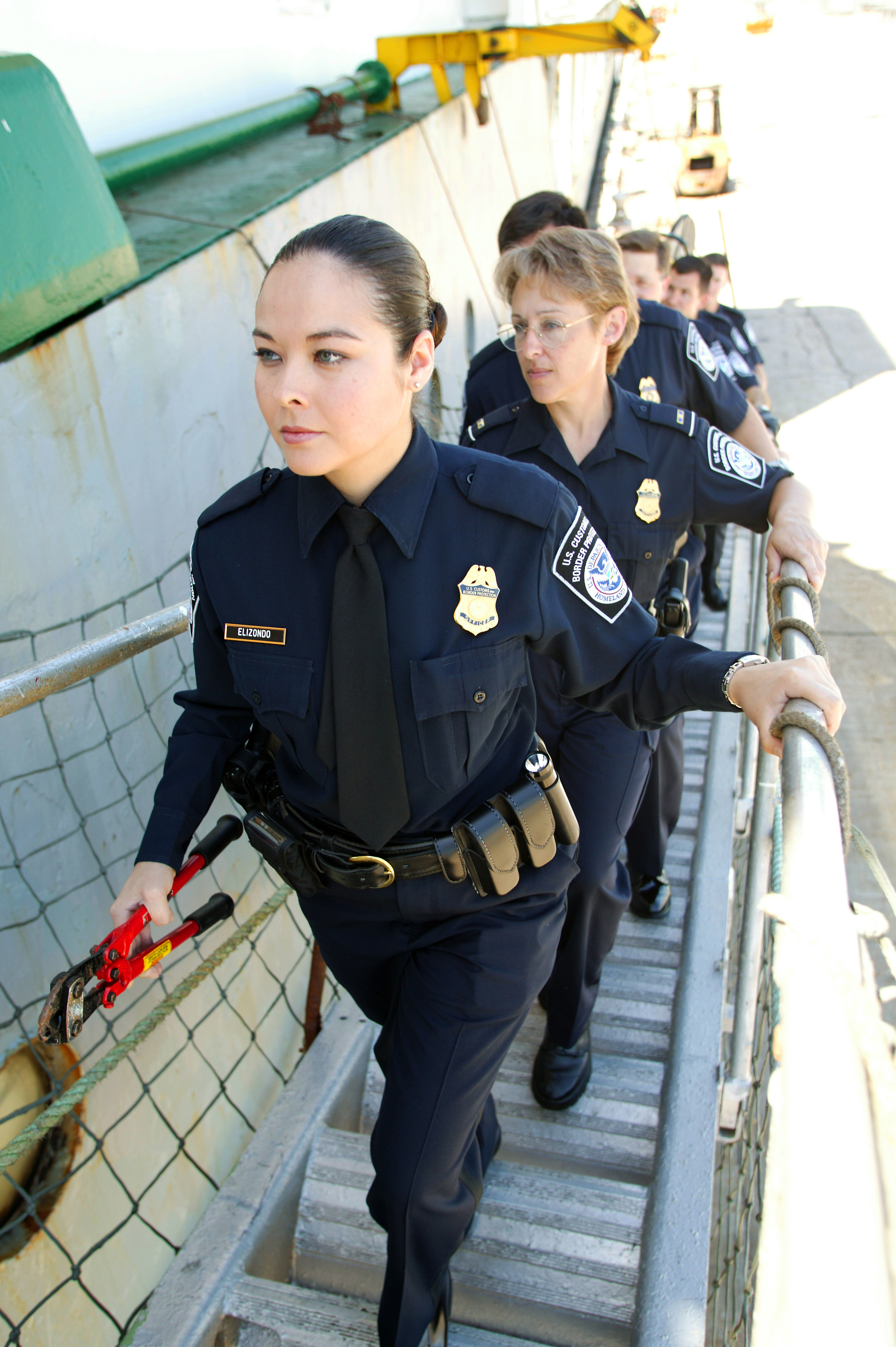
Officers board a ship using a gangway.

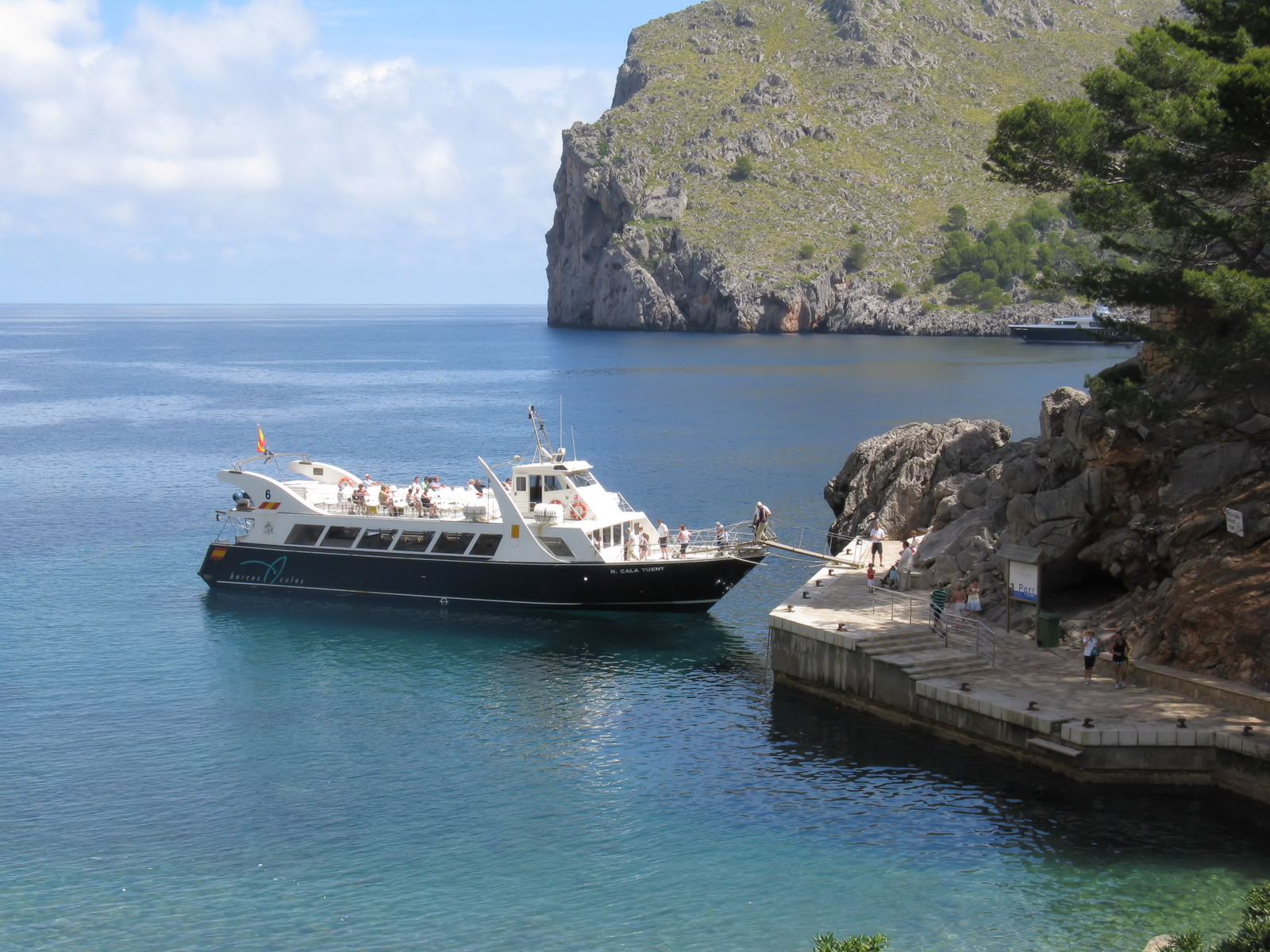
Tourists board a boat in Mallorca (Spain) for a coastal trip from Sa Calobra to Port de Soller

== Buses ==
Passengers board buses in the United Kingdom by either indicating to the bus driver they want to board (by queuing up at the bus stop or by holding out an arm) or by boarding when a bus has stopped at a bus station.

Once on board passengers can either purchase a ticket for their journey or they can show a travel pass (such as an Oyster card when passengers travel on London buses).

On long-distance buses in Europe tickets are usually checked upon boarding whereas in Latin America fares or tickets are collected on the moving bus by an assistant to the driver.
