= Maksym Zaremskyi =

Ukrainian trainer and politician

- Максим Заремський
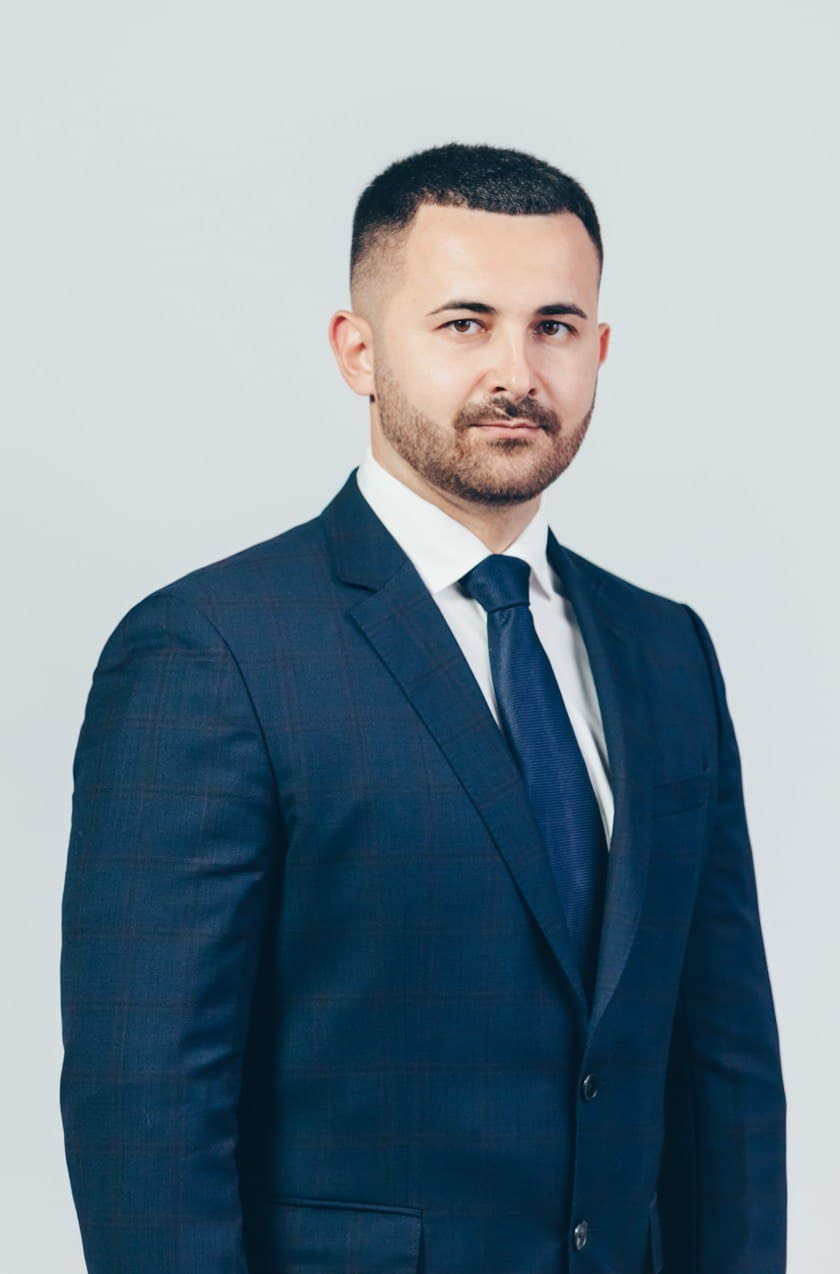
- Zaremskyi in 2021

People's Deputy of Ukraine
- Incumbent
- Assumed office 29 August 2019
- Preceded by: Ivan Rybak
- Constituency: Chernivtsi Oblast, No. 202

Personal details
- Born: 26 September 1991 (age 35) Mogilev, Belarus
- Party: Servant of the People
- Other political affiliations: Independent
- Education: Chernivtsi University

Maksym Valentynovych Zaremskyi (Ukrainian: Максим Валентинович Заремський; born 26 September 1991) is a Ukrainian trainer and politician currently serving as a People's Deputy of Ukraine from Ukraine's 202nd electoral district. He is a member of Servant of the People.

== Early life and career ==
Zaremskyi was born on 26 September 1991 in Mogilev, Belarus. He graduated from Bukovina University and Chernivtsi University, on both occasions majoring in law. He is the founder of the MaksymuS gym company, as well as the annual Beregomet Open Sport Festival.

== Political career ==
From 2010 to 2018, Zaremskyi was an independent deputy of the Berehomet local council, and was involved in issues including the local agricultural industry and the environment. From 2013 to 2015, he was Minister of Emergency Situations of Kitsman Raion, and he subsequently served as Head of the Department of Planning, Operational Duty, Communication and Notification within Chernivtsi Oblast's Department of Population Civil Protection.

In the 2019 Ukrainian parliamentary election, Zaremskyi was elected as a People's Deputy of Ukraine from Ukraine's 202nd electoral district. At the time of his election, he was an independent. He is a member of the Committee of the Verkhovna Rada on issues of budget.
