= Louse Creek =

Louse Creek may refer to:

- Louse Creek (Alaska), a stream in Aleutians West Census Area
- Louse Creek (Missouri)
- Louse Creek (Niobrara River tributary), a stream in Holt County, Nebraska
- Louse Creek (South Dakota)
- Louse Creek (Tennessee), a stream in Lincoln County
