= The Papelipolas =

Los Papelípolas or The Papelipolas was a group of artists from Huila Department, in the Republic of Colombia arising in the year 1958. Their productions in the fields of theater, the narrative, the drawing, the cinema, the television and especially in the poetry, have been widely recognized and disseminated, even several decades after its dissolution. It was disbanded in the mid-1960s, and the components continued writing independently. The group's name is papel (paper in Spanish) and pola (cerveza or beer).

== The components ==
The group's regular payroll poetic Los Papelípolas is limited to six authors: Gustavo Andrade (highlighted in the fields of drama prize, winner in France, Spain, Costa Rica, among others, in film as screenwriter of the film The River of the Tombs; librettist of radio, television and short film director and producer of La Cantina de José Dolores). The others were apathetic to the events and to the movies, but with valuable works: Angel Sierra Basto (pseudonym of Victor Manuel Cortes Vargas, poet, education engine in the Huila, and politician, author of Dimensions, 1963 and Xenias & Apophoretas of Menein Laos, 1994), Dario Silva Silva (poet and current archbishop of House on the Rock, one of the forty most influential men of Colombia according to Semana magazine); Ruben Morales Buendía (erotic poet and one of the first cartoonists Huila), Julian Polanía Perez (poet and politician, author of The concept of Grief, 1958, and Narration of the Living Faces, 1963) and Luis Ernesto Luna (poet, bureaucrat, dedicated to political propaganda, author of Memory of Silence, 1988). Delimiro Moreno in his work The Papelípolas, Poetic Essay on a Generation (1995) added to Armando Ceron Castillo (author of Beyond Words, 2010 ) and then talked about Camilo Lara Cuenca as an appendix of them, with a recently published poetic production (Así Canta mi Lira, 2005), almost posthumously. The themes and style of these poets were always very heterogeneous group, as their spiritual and political ideology.

Two of them, especially with shared affinities with the Beat Generation: Angel Sierra Basto and Luis Ernesto Luna.

== The attribution of movement ==
The label of "movement", may be inaccurate. The ideals and artistic group shares similarities with the Beat Generation and The Hungry Generation. The papelípolas Angel Sierra Basto and Luis Ernesto Suárez alluded to Nirvana, the Upanishads, Buddhism, to free sexuality, alcohol and drugs as leaks. Other reasons given for giving the label of movement (as Colombian Beat generation, which it shares with the nothingness Antioquia), was that none of its members turned professional as a response to the educational model of unbridled capitalism. For some, a result of their political ideology, for others, economic limitations, but it is common. All this feeds the decadence French Huysmans (as evident in the prologue of dimensions of Angel Sierra Basto by Luis Ernesto Suárez and the Thebaid of Ananké), French writers Charles Baudelaire (Les Fleurs du mal), Gérard de Nerval, Arthur Rimbaud and Parnasianism of Paul Verlaine, also at Nicaraguan literary modernism Rubén Darío. Sierra Basto, the more Beat of all, tried to deconstruct the language with their Rhymes Rune, and other poems full of neologisms. Meanwhile, the founder of The Papelípolas, Gustavo Andrade was counter to provincial level, with his first Manifesto Papelípolas, letter to Ramiro Bahamón by the poet Silvia Lorenzo to national poets gathered in Medellín in 1958, and published this year in the first of three Notebooks Huila group: Concept of Grief with poems Julián Pérez Polanía, also with his essay Neiva needs a mayor who wants to Neiva and enjoying universal recognition plays like cutting.

The artistic value of the Papelípolas, was the subject of several pages by authors like David Rivera Moya, Roger Echavarría, Oliver Lis, Delimiro Moreno, Félix Ramiro Losada and Jorge Guebely. However, the label "movement" has been accepted by custom, though its definition has been as diverse and controversial.

== The Manifesto of The Papelipolas ==
The First Manifesto of Papelípolas was a letter from Gustavo Andrade to Ramiro Bahamón, which was filed with the acquiescence of the group by the poet Silvia Lorenzo before nadaístas poets among others in Medellín in 1958. This manifesto was published in the first of three books published huilenses that (his first broadcast medium), edited by Gustavo Andrade, Concept of Grief of Julian Perez Polanía.

== Publications ==
Input publications in literary tradition were undoubtedly the Notebooks Huila, achieved by successfully managing Gustavo Andrade Rivera to Intercol (International Petroleum Co.) and then the Echoes Magazine night baccalaureate José María Rojas Garrido with Angel Sierra Basto in the lead editorial in the years 1963 and 1964.

Select publications:

- ANDRADE RIVERA, Gustavo, Huila Papers, Printing Department, Neiva [1958-1963]
- ANDRADE RIVERA, Gustavo, Remington 22 and other plays, Colombian Institute of Culture, Canal Ramirez, Bogotá, 1973
- ANDRADE RIVERA, Gustavo, Gustavo Andrade Theatre Rivera, Huila Papers, # 3, Printing Department, sf, Neiva, 1972
- Polanía PÉREZ, Julian, Notion of Grief, in "Journal Huila" # 1, Printing Department, Neiva, 1958
- SIERRA BASTO, Angel [Victor Manuel Cortes Vargas] in Huila Papers, # 2, Printing Department, Neiva

All six poets published in the Journal of the Huila.

After the dissolution of the group were other publications, among which are:

- LUNA, Luis Ernesto, Memory of Silence. Poems. Journal of Cultural Extension Huilense Institute of Culture, Publishing Company of Huila, Neiva, 1988.
- SIERRA BASTO, Angel, Collection Apophoretas Menen Xenias and Laos, Luis Angel Arango Library, 1994, which would be expanded, illustrated and edited by Oliver Lis, with the biography of the poet in 2009.
- SILVA SILVA, Darius, The man who escaped from Hell, Editorial Good Seed, Bogotá, 1991.

== Dissolution ==
The solution was placed according to a newspaper article from the 70's attributed to Luis Ernesto Suarez, about the year 1962, claim that we know is false, because the third Huilense Notebook that is the Angel Sierra Basto Dimensions is the year 1963, as Narration of the Living Faces of Julian Polanía Perez. The solution is given almost equal to the group Beat and beatnik, in the sixties, immersed in countercultural movements. It could happen in the year 1964, with the departure of Gustavo Andrade of Colombia to Costa Rica, hoping some of consecrated as playwright abroad (which succeeded being awarded the prize of the Paris Theatre, among others), or the death of Julian Perez Polanía in a car accident in 1965.

== Papelipolas, The Movie ==
In 2013, the writer and filmmaker Oliver Lis and the Spanish producer Blanca Rosa de Aguilar, began shooting the film The Papelípolas, Twilight of a Poetic Generation with the survivors Armando Ceron Castillo and Dario Silva Silva. Colombian-French-Spanish production, attended by the former Minister of Justice of Colombia, Guillermo Plazas Alcid, the former governor of Huila, Julio Enrique Ortiz, and the writers Jorge Guebely Ortega and Delimiro Moreno, as the descendants of the poets. The film is part of what its author called Phenomenological Cinema.

== Sources ==
- HUILA'S HISTORY ACADEMY, Revista Huila – Órgano de la Academia Huilense de Historia, Vol. XI – edición N° 53, enero-junio de 2003, págs. 156 y s.s.
- HUILA'S HISTORY ACADEMY, Revista Huila – Órgano de la Academia Huilense de Historia, Vol. XIII – edición N° 58, diciembre de 2007.
- ANDRADE RIVERA, Gustavo, 'Cuadernos Huilenses', Departamental Publishing House, Neiva [1958-1963].
- ANDRADE RIVERA, Gustavo, 'Remington 22 y otras piezas de teatro', Colombian Institute of Culture, Canal Ramírez, Bogotá, 1973.
- ANDRADE RIVERA, Gustavo, 'Teatro de Gustavo Andrade Rivera', Cuadernos Huilenses, # 3, Imprenta Departamental, 1959, Neiva, ed. 2, 1965.
- CERÓN, Armando, 'Antología Poética', Departament of the Huila, Artes Gráficas García Artunduaga & Cia. Ltda. Caliche Impresores, 2003.
- CERÓN, Armando, 'Sinopsis de Vibraciones Poéticas', unedit, 2007.
- GARCÉS, Esmir, 'Memoria Secreta de la Infancia [compilación de varios autores]', Trilce y Altazor Editores, Bogotá, 2004, pág. 36.
- CORTÉS VARGAS, Víctor y SERRANO MONTENEGRO, Ernesto, 'Estatutos de la Fundación Jorge Eliécer Gaitán', two editions, 1971.
- CORTÉS VARGAS, Víctor y SERRANO MONTENEGRO, Ernesto, 'Estatutos del Club Cívico del Huila', Fundación Jorge Eliécer Gaitán, 1971.
- DIARIO DEL HUILA, editions of 24 de September 1972 [pág. 2A], 25 of April 1980 [pág. 4A]; 6 of march of 1989; 26 of October 1992; 18 of January 1994 [page 6A]; 21 of October 1996 [pág. 4A]; 20 of July 1997 [page 2b]; 24 of may of 2007; y 8 of November 2007.
- SEMANARIO EL DEBATE, several volumes, drafted almost all by Víctor Manuel Cortés Vargas with various pseudonyms. Privated library of Guillermo Plazas Alcid, 1968-1980.
- DIARIO LA NACIÓN, editions of 12 of may of 2007 and 27 of may of 2007.
- ECHAVARRÍA, Rogelio, Antología de la Poesía Colombiana, Bogotá, El Áncora Editores, 1997.
- ECHAVARRÍA, Rogelio, Antología de la Poesía Contemporánea, Bogotá, Presidencia de la República, 1997.
- FUNDACIÓN PARA LA ENSEÑANZA Y LA PROMOCIÓN DE LOS OFICIOS Y LAS ARTES TIERRA DE PROMISIÓN, Facetas [culture supplement, circulating Sunday with Diario del Huila], in numbers 1, 38, 53, 62, 70, 78, 79, 118, 138, 140 y 166, into others [2004-2007]. Diario del Huila's archive.
- GUEBELLY, Jorge, Soledad y Orfandad del Hombre Moderno en la Poesía Huilense, Ed. Universidad Surcolombiana, 1987.
- LETRAS NACIONALES, Revista de Literatura Segunda Época # 24, mayo-junio de 1974.
- LICONA, Pedro, Crónica Poética del Huila, Instituto de Cultura Popular de Neiva, 1996.
- LIS, Óliver, Villoria López-Villoria Rojas, Descendientes de Pedro Suárez de Figueroa, Editorial López, Popayán, 2009.
- LIS, Óliver, Los Papelípolas, Antología Poética e su Quincuagésimo Aniversario, 2007.
- LIS, Óliver, Vida y Obra del Poeta Papelípola Ángel Sierra Basto, Editorial Samava, Popayán, 2010.
- LOSADA, Félix Ramiro, Literatura Huilense, Ediciones Centenario, 2005.
- LUNA, Luis Ernesto, Memoria del Silencio. Poetry. Cuadernos de Extensión Cultural del Instituto Huilense de Cultura, Empresa de Publicaciones del Huila, Neiva, 1988.
- MORENO, Delimiro, Los Papelípolas, Ensayo Sobre Una Generación Poética, Vargas Editores, Bogotá, 1995.
- PERIÓDICO EL LIBERAL SURCOLOMBIANO, first half of March 1977.
- PERIÓDICO PREGÓN DEL HUILA, April 11, 1973, p 2, and the second half of February 1974, p. 19 and 23.
- PERIÓDICO [MENSUAL] PRESENTE, Founded by Felio Andrade, and Romulo Gonzalez. Directed by Ismael Polanía. November 1992 edition.
- PLAZAS SÁNCHEZ, Francisco de Paula, Genealogías de la Provincia de Neiva, Kelly, Bogotá, 1965.
- POLANÍA PÉREZ, Julián, Noción de Pesadumbre, in “Cuadernos Huilenses” # 1, Imprenta Departamental, Neiva, 1958.
- POLANÍA PÉREZ, Julián, Narración de los Rostros Vivientes, in “Hojas de Cultura Huilense”, Imprenta Departamental, Neiva, 1963.
- POLANÍA POLANÍA, Antonio, Memorias Sobre Julián Polanía Pérez, manuscript, 1995.
