= Lis (given name) =

Lis is a female given name, sometimes short for Elisabeth. People with that name include:

- Lis Ahlmann (1894–1979), Danish weaver and textile designer
- Lis Brack-Bernsen (born 1946), Danish and Swiss mathematician, historian of science, and historian of mathematics
- Lis Frost (born 1961), Swedish cross country skier
- Lis Groes (1910–1974), Danish politician
- Lis Harris, American author and critic
- Lis Hartel (1921–2009), Danish equestrian
- Lis Howell, British journalist, television executive, and academic
- Lis Jacobsen (1882–1961), Danish philologist, archaeologist and writer
- Lis Jensen (born 1952), Danish social worker and politician
- Lis Jeppesen (born 1956), Danish ballerina
- Lis Lauritzen (born 1971), Danish cruise ship captain
- Lis Lewis, American voice coach
- Lis Løwert (1919–2009), Danish film actress
- Lis Mellemgaard (1924–2019), Danish ophthalmologist and resistance fighter
- Lis Møller (1918–1983), Danish journalist and politician
- Lis Nilheim (1944–2025), Swedish actress
- Lis Rhodes (born 1942), British artist and feminist filmmaker
- Lis Sladen (1946–2011), English television actress
- Lis Sørensen (born 1955), Danish pop singer
- Lis Verhoeven (1931–2019), German actress and theatre director
- Lis Wiehl (born 1961), American novelist, legal scholar, and television personality

== See also ==
- Lis Shoshi, Kosovan basketball player
- Lis (surname)
