= Klaus-Dieter Liss =

German-Australian physicist

Klaus-Dieter Liss, German: Liß, (born 10 June 1962) is a German-Australian physicist working in the field of experimental X-ray and neutron scattering and their applications. Liss research is on in-situ and real-time experiments with synchrotron and neutron radiation for the characterization of thermo-mechanical processes in metals; the investigation of phase transformations; the evolution of microstructures; and the kinetics of defects. His experimental achievements are the development of the Materials oscilloscope and the realization of the X-ray photon storage.

Liss has majored in physics at the Technical University of Munich (diploma in 1990, institute E21 under Wolfgang Gläser and Anton Zeilinger) and received his doctorate at RWTH Aachen in 1995 under Tasso Springer and Dieter Richter, while he prepared his thesis on neutron and X-rays optics at the Laue-Langevin Institute in Grenoble. After a short postdoc he became the responsible scientist and manager of the high-energy beamline at the European Synchrotron Radiation Facility, senior scientist at DESY, at the Helmholtz-Zentrum Geesthacht – Center for Materials and Coastal research and the Hamburg University of Technology. He is honorary professor at the University of Wollongong and has been working at a senior research fellow and principal scientist at the Bragg Institute of the Australian Nuclear Science and Technology Organisation in New South Wales (2004–2017). He has been one of the instrument scientists at the Wombat neutron diffractometer and the Dingo neutron radiography station.

Liss is actually a full Research Professor within the University of Tennessee - Oak Ridge Innovation Institute, and joint faculty at UTK Materials Science and Engineering. He still holds a full Honorary Professor title at University of Wollongong. Previously, as of October 2017, Liss became a full professor at the Technion – Israel Institute of Technology to act as one of the first fully employed research professors at the faculty of the Guangdong Technion – Israel Institute of Technology (GTIIT) in Shantou, China.

He has authored over 130 scientific publications.
