= Ukraine's 201st electoral district =

Electoral district in Chernivtsi Oblast, Ukraine

Coordinates: 48.28556963041753°N 25.934023099999987°E

- Electoral district for the Verkhovna Rada
- Region: Chernivtsi Oblast

Current Electoral district
- Created: 2012
Party
Olena Lys
Servant of the People

Ukraine's 201st electoral district is a Verkhovna Rada (parliament) constituency in Chernivtsi Oblast. Established in its current form in 2012, it comprises part of the oblast's capital, Chernivtsi (along with the larger 203rd district). The district includes 107 polling stations.

The constituency is bordered by the 202nd electoral district to the west, the 203rd district to the east and south, and the 204th electoral district to the north.

== People's Deputies ==
Party	Member	Portrait	Election
Batkivshchyna	Mykola Fedorchuk		2012
People's Front	Mykola Fedorchuk		2014
Servant of the People	Olena Lys		2019

== Elections ==
=== 2019 ===
2019 Ukrainian parliamentary election
Party	Candidate	Votes	%
Servant of the People	Olena Lys	24,243	34.7%
Independent	Mykola Fedorchuk	9,298	13.3%
Opposition Platform — For Life	Vitalii Mykhailishyn	8,711	12.5%
European Solidarity	Nataliia Frunze	4,266	6.1%
Holos	Maksym Kyiak	3,450	5.0%
Svoboda	Vasyl Zazuliak	2,954	4.2%
Independent	Mykhailo Yarynych	2,859	4.1%
Batkivshchyna	Oleksandr Purshaha	2,821	4.0%
Independent	Valentyna Radchuk	2,766	4.0%
Independent	Volodymyr Didukh-Kobzar	2,133	3.0%
SiCh	Halyna Zhuk	1,984	2.8%
Independent	Andrii Bezborodko	1,093	1.6%
Self Reliance	Inna Kubai	759	1.1%
Others		2,615	3.6%
Total votes		69,952	100.0%
Servant of the People gain from People's Front		Swing	New

=== 2014 ===
2014 Ukrainian parliamentary election
Party	Candidate	Votes	%
People's Front	Mykola Fedorchuk	29,525	34.9%
Petro Poroshenko Bloc	Nataliia Yakymchuk	24,775	29.3%
Independent	Vitalii Mykhailishyn	13,693	16.2%
Batkivshchyna	Yurii Bureha	13,693	6.5%
Radical Party	Nazar Horuk	3,133	3.7%
Independent	Valerii Marchuk	1,645	1.9%
URP	Nataliia Strelchuk	1,292	1.5%
Strong Ukraine	Yevhen Motovylin	948	1.1%
Others		2,063	4.9%
Total votes		84,693	100.0%
People's Front gain from Batkivshchyna		Swing	New

=== 2012 ===
2012 Ukrainian parliamentary election
Party	Candidate	Votes	%
Batkivshchyna	Mykola Fedorchuk	52,901	52.0%
Party of Regions	Vitalii Mykhailishyn	34,472	33.9%
UDAR	Halyna Mararash	6,656	6.5%
People's	Viktor Bachynskyi	2,413	2.4%
KPU	Ivan Bordiian	2,050	2.0%
Others		3,148	3.2%
Total votes		101,640	100.0%
Batkivshchyna win (new seat)			

== See also ==
- Electoral districts of Ukraine
- Foreign electoral district of Ukraine
