= Ukraine's 202nd electoral district =

Electoral district in Chernivtsi Oblast, Ukraine

Coordinates: 48.16035919508813°N 25.7215662°E

- Electoral district for the Verkhovna Rada
- Region: Chernivtsi Oblast

Current Electoral district
- Created: 2012
Party
Maksym Zaremskyi
Servant of the People

Ukraine's 202nd electoral district is a Verkhovna Rada (parliament) constituency in Chernivtsi Oblast. Established in its current form in 2012, it comprises the western part of the oblast, including Vyzhnytsia Raion and parts of Chernivtsi Raion. Prior to the administrative division reform, it included Vyzhnytsia, Kitsman, and Putyla raions, as well as part of Storozhynets Raion. The district includes 166 polling stations.

The constituency is bordered by the 89th electoral district in Ivano-Frankivsk Oblast to the west, the 201st, 203rd, and 204th electoral districts to the east, the 89th and 204th districts to the north, and Romania to the south.

== People's Deputies ==
Party	Member	Portrait	Election
Batkivshchyna	Oleksandr Fyshchuk		2012
Petro Poroshenko Bloc	Ivan Rybak		2014
Servant of the People	Maksym Zaremskyi		2019

== Elections ==
=== 2019 ===
2019 Ukrainian parliamentary election
Party	Candidate	Votes	%
SN	Maksym Zaremskyi	26,023	34.7%
Independent	Ivan Rybak	12,084	17.2%
Batkivshchyna	Andrii Makovei	9,016	12.8%
Independent	Petro Frei	9,016	4.7%
Independent	Mykola Orendovych	3,234	4.6%
Independent	Ivan Tychyna	2,158	3.1%
OPZZh	Vitalii Kysylytsia	1,940	2.8%
SiCh	Oleksandr Fyshchuk	1,922	2.7%
Radical Party	Volodymyr Hiliuk	1,890	2.7%
Svoboda	Rostyslav Poklitar	1,528	2.2%
YeS	Oleksandr Kupchanko	1,516	2.2%
Independent	Kateryna Shapovalova	1,155	1.6%
Self Reliance	Mykhailo Chornei	1,054	1.5%
APU	Iryna Antoniuk	862	1.2%
Independent	Vasyl Toderenchuk	795	1.1%
Opposition Bloc	Ihor Kozak	692	1.0%
Others		1,102	3.9%
Total votes		70,260	100.0%
SN gain from Petro Poroshenko Bloc		Swing	New

=== 2014 ===
2014 Ukrainian parliamentary election
Party	Candidate	Votes	%
Petro Poroshenko Bloc	Ivan Rybak	17,794	21.3%
People's Front	Oleksandr Fyshchuk	16,437	19.7%
Independent	Andrii Makovei	9,121	10.9%
Independent	Mykola Karliichuk	8,137	9.7%
Civil Position	Vasyl Filipchuk	7,292	8.7%
Batkivshchyna	Heorhii Filipchuk	5,312	6.4%
Radical Party	Inha Makovetska	3,744	4.5%
Independent	Mykola Sobko	3,195	3.8%
Independent	Vasyl Tkachuk	2,421	2.9%
Independent	Volodymyr Hnatyshyn	2,323	2.8%
Strong Ukraine	Frants Fedorovych	2,121	2.5%
Independent	Stepan Ternovetskyi	1,633	2.0%
Independent	Roman Chobotar	1,449	1.7%
Bloc of Left Forces of Ukraine	Emiliia Choban	1,045	1.2%
Others		1,578	1.9%
Total votes		83,602	100.0%
Petro Poroshenko Bloc gain from Batkivshchyna		Swing	New

=== 2012 ===
2012 Ukrainian parliamentary election
Party	Candidate	Votes	%
Batkivshchyna	Oleksandr Fyshchuk	39,540	40.3%
Party of Regions	Mykhailo Bauer	25,915	26.4%
Independent	Ivan Rybak	14,258	14.5%
UDAR	Klavdiia Nazarenko	6,162	6.3%
Independent	Vasyl Liubomyrskyi	3,430	3.5%
Independent	Ihor Baskevych	2,243	2.3%
People's	Mykhailo Seretskyi	1,788	1.8%
KPU	Leonid Shvyhar	1,575	1.6%
Sobor Party	Heorhii Manchulenko	1,205	1.2%
Independent	Oleksandr Lysiuk	1,186	1.2%
Others		784	0.8%
Total votes			100.0%
Batkivshchyna win (new seat)			

== See also ==
- Electoral districts of Ukraine
- Foreign electoral district of Ukraine
