= Materials oscilloscope =

A materials oscilloscope is a time-resolved synchrotron high-energy X-ray technique to study rapid phase composition and microstructural related changes in a polycrystalline sample. Such device has been developed for in-situ studies of specimens undergoing physical thermo-mechanical simulation.

== Principle ==
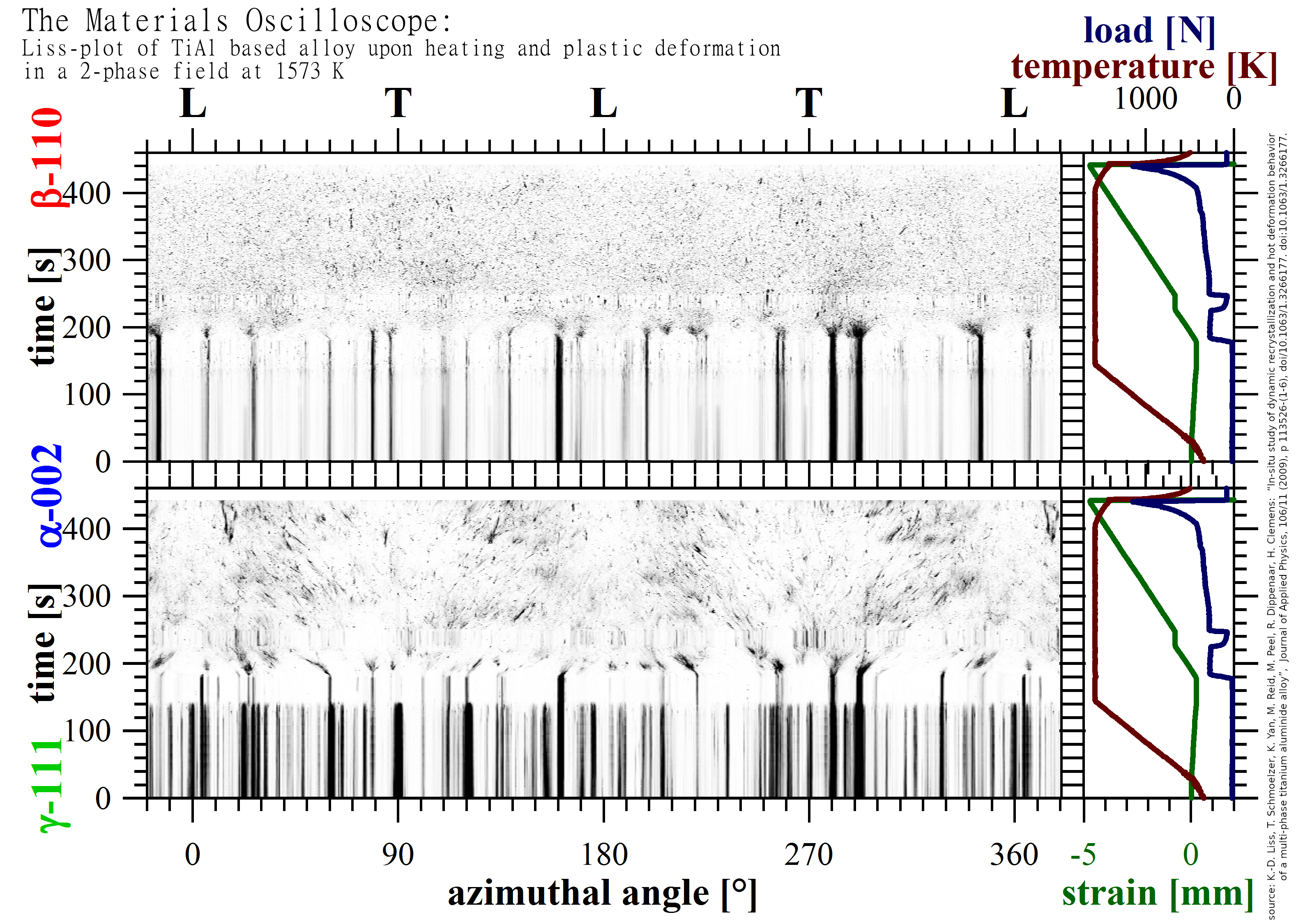
Typical materials oscilloscope traces of a two-phase metal under plastic deformation at high temperature.

Two-dimensional diffraction images of a fine synchrotron beam interacting with the specimen are recorded in time frames, such that reflections stemming from individual crystallites of the polycrystalline material can be distinguished. Data treatment is undertaken in a way that diffraction rings are straightened and presented line by line streaked in time. The traces, so-called timelines in azimuthal-angle/time plots resemble to traces of an oscilloscope, giving insight on the processes happening in the material, while undergoing plastic deformation, or heating, or both, These timelines allow to distinguish grain growth or refinement, subgrain formation, slip deformation systems, crystallographic twinning, dynamic recovery, dynamic recrystallization, simultaneously in multiple phases.

== History ==
The development has been undertaken from a project on modern diffraction methods for the investigation of thermo-mechanical processeses, and started with cold deformation of a copper specimen at the ESRF in 2007, followed by hot deformation of zirconium alloy at APS in 2008. Soon afterwards, a series of other materials has been tested and experience with the timeline traces gained. While ESRF and APS played the major role in experimental facilities, the Japanese high-energy synchrotron in the round, SPring-8 followed in 2013 by performing feasibility studies of this kind. Meanwhile, the new PETRA III synchrotron at DESY built a dedicated beamline for this purpose, opening the Materials Oscilloscope investigations to a larger public. The name materials oscilloscope was introduced in 2013 and used onward upon conferences such as MRS and TMS.

== Implementation ==
Besides setups in multi-purpose facilities, the first dedicated end-station has been built at the PETRA-III storage ring, where this technique is routinely applied.
