= M'Liss =

M'Liss may refer to:

- M'Liss: An Idyll of Red Mountain, a novella by Bret Harte
  - M'Liss (play), an 1877 play co-authored by Clay M. Greene, adapted from the 1860 short story "The Work on Red Mountain" by Bret Harte, and its subsequent expansion into a larger serialized novel by Harte in 1863

After the success of this play, either the play or Harte's original source material was the basis for several film adaptations:

- M'Liss (1915 film)
- M'Liss (1918 film), starring Mary Pickford
- M'Liss (1936 film)
