= Oliver Lis =

Colombian poet, author and film director

- Born: Andres Oliver Ucros & Licht; 17 October 1984 (age 41); Bogotá, Colombia
- Occupation: Writer
- Years active: 2010–present

Óliver Lis or Andres Oliver Ucros & Licht (born 17 October 1984) is a Colombian editor, literary agent, author, psychologist, film producer, screenwriter, international journalist.

== Oeuvre ==
Lis has written 17 books of genealogy, ontology, epistemology, history and poetry and is the founder of the Alternative Academy of History.

=== Genealogy and history ===
Among the 17 books are published by Lis: Founding Families of Popayán and Neiva (2013), The Papelipolas, First Cultural & Literary Movement of the Huila (Huila Magazine – Huila's Academy of History, Volume XIII – Issue No. 58, 2007), Life & Oeuvre of the Papelipola's Poet Angel Sierra Basto – Xenias and Apophoretas of Menein Laos (editorial Samava, Popayan, two editions, 2009 and 2010); Villoria Lopez / Villoria Rojas, Genealogies Cauca & Huila, Descendants of Pedro Suarez Figueroa. (editorial Lopez, Popayan, two editions, 2009 and 2010), the last three with the supporting documentation and images of the National Museum of Colombia; the Room of Rare and Manuscripts of the Bank of the Republic of Colombia, the General Archive of the Nation and the Central Archive of Cauca from the University of Cauca.

=== Press ===
He worked for several years in the newspaper The Liberal of Popayán, articles of Facets, from the Diario del Huila, LAS2ORILLAS, El Espectador, among others.

== Biographical summary ==
Born in Bogotá in 1984, the son of Jorge Lis Ucros, who appears in several editions of Who's Who in the World of Science and the lawyer Ines Cortes Rincon, from Pitalito, associated judge of the Superior Court in Neiva. On the paternal side is the grandson of the exsenator Carlos Antonio Lis and Eugenia Ucros Garcia, sister of Eduardo and Jaime Ucrós García, governors of Huila (the last also senator). On the maternal side he is the grandson of the poet cofounder of The Papelipolas and motor of education, Victor Manuel Cortes Vargas (Angel Sierra Basto in the poetry), Pitalito poet by antonomasia, secretary of the President of the Senate of Colombia and his wife, Beatriz Rincon Alvarez.

His education, took place in the Cooperative College Campestre of Rivera. Then in the University of Cauca in laws initially, which had among its teachers constitutionalists Ernesto Saa Velasco, and others. Later political science where he befriended the Afro-colombian writer William Mina Aragon PhD, becoming in his editor; and philosophy courses with Silvio E. Avendaño Cuervo, director of the Utopia's Magazine who was the prologist of the second edition of his first book. Received from the hands of the poet Gloria Cepeda Vargas the Association of Caucan Writers membership in 2009, and 2011 of Gencauca (Genealogists of Greater Cauca) as guest speaker at the III International Congress of Genealogists Guadalajara de Buga.

== Works in Spanish ==
=== Representative books ===
- VILLORIA LÓPEZ / VILLORIA ROJAS, Genealogías Caucanas & Huilenses. Descendientes de Pedro Suárez de Figueroa. Editorial López, 2009. 4 editions. Imágenes del Museo Nacional. ISBN 9789584447272. See more at LABLAA.
- XENIAS & APOPHORETAS DE MENEIN LAOS. Vida y Obra del Poeta Papelípola Ángel Sierra Basto. Editorial Samava, 2009. Dos ediciones. ISBN 9789584461094. See more at LABLAA.
- UCRÓS O DUCROS. Genealogías de Francia, España y Colombia. Siglos XVI al XXI. *Editorial Popayán, diciembre de 2016. *Primera Edición. ISBN 978-958-48-0106-7.

=== Science articles ===
'TRASTORNOS DE PERSONALIDAD Y VIOLENCIA. Artículo de Reflexión para el Posconflicto Colombiano". Revista FACE, categoría C de Colciencias de la Universidad de Pamplona. Volumen 16-N°2 año 2016. Págs. 5 a 19. ISSN Impreso: 1794-9920 – ISSN Electrónico: 2500–9338.

=== Editor ===
As editor of the Intellectual Patrimony Foundation of the Cauca (Fundación Caucana de Patrimonio in Spanish) was educated by the science editor, Ricardo Quintero Rivera, file holder of the most important motion pictures of Cauca and the friendship of Hernán Torres Valencia, PhD, grandson of the poet Guillermo Valencia, publishing over thirty historical and artistic titles. In 2011 Lis created the literary agency, publishing and production house, Heroine S.A.S., accompanied by the former mayor of Neiva, Hernan Velasco Zea. In 2015 founded Editorial Popayán, Special Projects Division of Indugráfica de Occidente, in partnership with Guillermo Muñoz Botina, printer.

=== Literary agent ===
Lis represents through the literary agency Heroine S.A.S. the renowned Colombian writers Víctor Paz Otero, finalist in the Romulo Gallegos award, four times winner of the Latino Book Award N.Y., Elvio Cáceres, winner of the Iberoamerican Jazz Festival of Popayan's Prize; Mariano Ospina, Gordon University historian, Jorge Muñoz Fernández, UBV Poetry Prize, Rodrigo Valencia Quijano, into others.

=== Radio, cinema and television ===
In 2010, Lis participated in television as host of The Time Jazz, programme broadcast on Telmex's Channel with the writer Jairo Grijalba Ruiz, as a continuation of La Tertulia de la Radio of Radio Universidad del Cauca (HJC20 104.1 FM), its management facilitated the Latin American Festival of Jazz and World Music of Popayán. In 2010, Lis was the actor of La Cabellera, University of Cauca's movie, film nominated for best picture at the Caesars prizes; Apple, co-directed and co-produced with Sol Angela Lopez; Lis also directed and produced the documentary Inclusive Education, with Uniminuto, published by the Intellectual Patrimony Foundation of the Cauca. In 2012 started filming proposal The Papelipolas as director and producer, and the radio programme by livestream La Coya de la Radio in Southcolombian Radio, broadcasting programme (1060 AM). He studied film, and production workshops in Colombia and Argentina, where collaborated with film projects. His proposal is the phenomenological cinema.

== Bibliography ==
- "The Liberal", newspaper, 6 April 2009. Several pages.
- Guillermo Plazas Alvid, Justice minister of Colombia, "Memory of Victor Manuel Cortes": In "Life and Oeuvre of the Papelipola's Poet, Angel Sierra Basto" by Oliver Lis. 2009.
