= Liss Platt =

Canadian artist

Liss Platt (born 1965) is a Canadian artist who works in a variety of media, including video, film and installation. Her work is included in the collections of the Whitney Museum of American Art and the RISD Museum.
