= Lis Brack-Bernsen =

Danish and Swiss mathematician

- Born: March 2, 1946 (age 80); Copenhagen, Denmark
- Education: University of Copenhagen; University of Basel
- Scientific career
- Fields: History of science
- Workplaces: University of Regensburg

Lis Brack-Bernsen (born 2 March 1946) is a Danish and Swiss mathematician, historian of science, and historian of mathematics, known for her work on Babylonian astronomy. She is an extraordinary professor of the history of science at the University of Regensburg.

== Education and career ==
Brack-Bernsen was born in Copenhagen on 2 March 1946. She earned a diploma in mathematics with a minor in physics from the University of Copenhagen in 1970, with Olaf Schmidt as a mentor, and completed her Ph.D. in the history of mathematics in 1974 at the University of Basel, also with studies at Stony Brook University. Her dissertation was Die Basler Mayatafeln; astronomische Deutung der Inschriften auf den Türstürzen 2 und 3 aus Tempel IV in Tikal, and was promoted by J. O. Fleckenstein.

She worked as a lecturer at the University of Copenhagen for 1974–1975, as a researcher at Stony Brook University from 1975 to 1977, and as a researcher in Grenoble and Regensburg from 1977 to 1979. However, at this time she left research to raise a family.

In 1997 she completed her habilitation at Goethe University Frankfurt. She worked as a privatdozentin at Goethe University until 1999, when she moved to the University of Regensburg.

== Contributions ==
Brack-Bernsen founded the “Regensburg” workshop series, which assembled specialists in Babylonian astronomy for intense and productive discussions about critical areas in the field. Following her inaugural 2002 workshop in Regensburg, which lent its name to the series, subsequent workshops were held in Amsterdam in 2004, Durham in 2008, and Berlin in 2014.

=== Lunar Six ===
One of Brack-Bernsen's most important contributions to the field of the history of the exact sciences was her identification of a method used by Babylonian astronomers for predicting the time between the rising and setting of the moon and sun, called the lunar six, that are preserved on tablet TU 11. The lunar six are a group of six time interval measurements used in Babylonian astronomy, consisting of four intervals measured around the full moon in the middle of the Babylonian lunar month, and two measured around the new moon. The four values measured in the middle of the month, often called the lunar four, include ŠU_{2} (moonset to sunrise), NA (sunrise to moonset), ME (moonrise to sunset), and GE_{6} (sunset to moonrise). ŠU_{2} and NA can be seen as measuring the same quantity — if the moon sets first, the interval is labelled ŠU_{2}, while if the sunset comes first it is called NA. ME and GE_{6} are both measured on the eastern horizon, while ŠU_{2} and NA are both measured on the western horizon. At the beginning of the month, the interval NA measures the time from sunset to moonset, and on the day when the moon is seen for the last time the interval KUR measures moonrise to sunset. While much of Babylonian astronomy is rooted in the observation of these phenomena, astronomers developed ways of predicting values for the lunar six to both aid and supplement observational records.

Brack-Bernsen identified a process for predicting lunar six values based on the Saros cycle. Babylonian astronomers were able to measure the daily retardation of the setting of the full moon by combining lunar six values ŠU_{2} + NA for the full moon, and daily retardation of the rising moon by combining lunar six values ME + GE_{6}. These values repeat after one full Saros cycle (223 months), but the Saros cycle is on average 1/3 of a day longer than a whole day (see below for further discussion on the varying length of this time period). So using a formula based on the old value for a lunar six variable from one Saros cycle previous plus one third of one of these values for the daily retardation of the setting or rising of the moon, astronomers were able to predict the lunar six values for a new month.

NA_{n} = NA_{n-223} - 1/3(ŠU_{2} + NA)_{n-223}

ŠU_{n} = ŠU_{n-223} + 1/3(ŠU_{2} + NA)_{n-223}

ME_{n} = ME_{n-223} + 1/3(ME+GE_{6})_{n-223}

Where n = the current/goal month and n-223 = one Saros cycle earlier.

Brack-Bernsen identified and outlined this method in TU 11, and its use is bolstered by the inclusion in Goal-Year texts of lunar six values from one Saros period earlier. However, the daily retardation of a new moon cannot be measured directly due to the lack of visibility around conjunction (except in the event of an eclipse). To compensate for this, Babylonian astronomers took measurement of the daily retardation of a full moon six months prior, which is a fairly accurate measurement for this hard-to-see value.

NA_{n} = NA_{n-223} - 1/3(ŠU_{2} + NA)_{n-229}

Brack-Bernsen uncovered a method for predicting these lunar six values that had been lost to modern researchers but that informed the development of their lunar astronomical systems and observational programs. Lunar six values were integral in the development of Babylonian lunar theory. Values of the lunar six seem to have played a role in establishing the contribution of lunar anomaly to the Babylonian lunar theory System A. The length of the Saros cycle is established as 223 synodic months, which corresponds to 6585 days + 6 to 11 hours. The variability in the number of hours is caused by the combination of lunar and solar anomaly and the fact that the Saros cycle does not equate to a whole number anomalistic months, and, therefore, does not indicate an exact return of lunar velocity. However, lunar anomaly, while important for a lunar theory, is not directly observable and its effects are intertwined with the effects of solar anomaly. This is where lunar six data becomes valuable — because these intervals are measured just before and after the full moon and on both horizons, their combination ends up cancelling out all contributing factors except lunar anomaly. In particular, the lunar four measured around the full moon — ME, ŠU_{2}, GE_{6}, and NA — combine to allow for the approximation of the effect of lunar anomaly.

The sum of these lunar four values provides approximately the same period and roughly the same magnitude and variation of what we find in the column designated Φ in System A lunar ephemerides. We can therefore view column Φ as a representation of lunar anomaly, drawing from observations of the lunar four and with solar anomaly assumed to be at its maximum. Originally, this column was understood to just represent the excess in the length of the Saros cycle over 6585 days, but it turns out that it becomes one of the four necessary inputs into system (along with zodiacal position at syzygy (column B), lunar node, and some original syzygy) upon which the data in the other columns depend. In fact, column Φ is the first column listed in a System A ephemeris after the date, perhaps indicating its importance to the system.

This interpretation of column Φ and the importance of the lunar six intervals was proposed by Brack-Bernsen, and was bolstered by the discovery of 7th century BCE tablets recording lunar six data by Huber and Steele, implying enough time to calculate cycles of lunar six data. Despite the prevalence of lunar four data in the development of Lunar theory System A, however, System B Lunar theory uses a simpler zigzag model of lunar anomaly that does not seem to rely on lunar four or lunar six measurements. Some of Brack-Bernsen's most recent work focuses on a new understanding of column Φ in Babylonian lunar theory, and how this column relied on some of the lunar six values to predict the times and durations of lunar eclipses.

Brack-Bernsen's work also provided an early exploration into the relationship between observation and theory in Babylonian astronomy and the observational and procedural texts produced from these practices. Her identification of methods of prediction provided the ability to look for records of unobserved phenomena in texts like the Babylonian astronomical diaries in order to gain a better understanding of the intricate ways in which observations inform the ability to predict astral phenomena, which in turn guide observations and, in some cases, are recorded as observations.

== Recognition ==
Brack-Bernsen was elected to the Academy of Sciences Leopoldina in 2009.

A festschrift, Studies on the Ancient Exact Sciences in Honour of Lis Brack-Bernsen (John Steele and Mathieu Ossendrijver, eds.) was published by Edition Topoi in 2017.

== Select publications ==
=== Articles ===
- "On the Construction of Column B in System A of the Astronomical Cuneiform Texts" (as Lis Bernsen). Centaurus 14.1 (1969): 23–28.
- "Some Investigations on the Ephemerides of the Babylonian Moon Texts, System A." Centaurus 24.1 (1980): 36–50.
- "Bisectable Trapezia in Babylonian Mathematics" (with Olaf Schmidt). Centaurus 33.1 (1990): 1–38.
- "On the Babylonian Lunar Theory: A Construction of Column Φ from Horizontal Observations." Centaurus 33.1 (1990): 39–56.
- "On the Foundations of the Babylonian Column Φ: Astronomical Significance of Partial Sums of the Lunar Four" (with Olaf Schmidt). Centaurus 37.3 (1994): 183–209.
- "The Babylonian Zodiac: Speculations on Its Invention and Significance" (with Hermann Hunger). Centaurus 41.4 (1999): 280–292.
- "TU 11: A Collection of Rules for the Prediction of Lunar Phases and of Month Lengths" (with Hermann Hunger). SCIAMVS 3 (2003): 3–90.
- "The Path of the Moon, the Rising Points of the Sun, and the Oblique Great Circle on the Celestial Sphere." Centaurus 45 (2003): 16–31.
- "Analyzing Shell Structure from Babylonian and Modern Times" (with Matthias Brack). International Journal of Modern Physics (Series E) 13 (2004): 247–260.
- "The 'Days in Excess' from MUL.APIN: On the 'First Intercalation' and 'Water Clock' Schemes from MUL.APIN." Centaurus 47.1 (2005): 1–29.
- "Eclipse Prediction and the Length of the Saros in Babylonian Astronomy" (with John M. Steele). Centaurus 47.3 (2005): 181–206.
- "On the 'Atypical Astronomical Cuneiform Text E': A Mean-Value Scheme for Predicting Lunar Attitude" (with Hermann Hunger). Archiv für Orientforschung 51 (2005/2006): 96–107.
- "BM 42282+42294 and the Goal-Year Method" (with Hermann Hunger). SCIAMVS 9 (2008): 3–23.
- "Prediction of Days and Pattern of the Babylonian Lunar Six." Archiv für Orientforschung 52 (2011): 156–178.
- "Babylonische Astronomie und Mathematik." Mitteilungen der mathematischen Gesellschaft in Hamburg 33 (2013): 47–77.

=== Books ===
- Die Basler Mayatafeln: Astronomische Deutung der Inschriften auf den Türstürzen 2 und 3 aus Tempel IV in Tikal. Basel: Birkhäuser, 1976.
- Zur Entstehung der Babylonischen Mondtheorie: Beobachtung und theoretische Berechnung von Mondphasen. Boethius 40. Stuttgart: Franz Steiner, 1997.
