= Lis (surname) =

Lis is a surname from the Polish word for a fox. Notable people with the name include:

- Andrzej Lis (born 1959), Polish fencer
- Bogdan Lis (born 1952), Polish politician
- Hanna Lis (born 1970), Polish TV journalist
- Iryna Lis (born 1972), Belarusian dressage rider
- Jakub Lis (born 2022), Polish footballer
- Joe Lis (1946–2010), American baseball player
- John T. Lis, American professor
- Lucjan Lis (1950–2015), Polish cyclist
- Oliver Lis (born 1984), Colombian writer
- Tomasz Lis (born 1966), Polish journalist and TV anchor

== See also ==
- Lis (given name)
