= Olena Lys =

Ukrainian politician

- Олена Лис
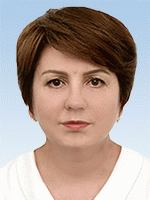
- Official portrait, 2019

People's Deputy of Ukraine
- Incumbent
- Assumed office 29 August 2019
- Preceded by: Mykola Fedoruk
- Constituency: Chernivtsi Oblast, No. 201

Personal details
- Born: 15 June 1971 (age 54) Bradok, Byelorussian SSR, Soviet Union (now Belarus)
- Party: Servant of the People
- Other political affiliations: Independent

Olena Heorhiyivna Lys (Ukrainian: Олена Георгіївна Лис; born 15 June 1971) is a Ukrainian politician currently serving as a People's Deputy of Ukraine from Ukraine's 201st electoral district since 29 August 2019. She is a member of Servant of the People.

== Early life and career ==
Olena Heorhiyivna Lys was born on 15 June 1971 in Bradok, in the Byelorussian Soviet Socialist Republic of the Soviet Union. In 1990, she graduated from Sokorosk Pedagogical School, and began teaching the same year. In 1997, she graduated from Chernivtsi University, majoring in elementary education and practical psychology. From 1996, she worked as a primary school teacher. Lys is married, and has one son and one daughter.

== Political career ==
Lys ran a successful campaign to become a People's Deputy of Ukraine from Ukraine's 201st electoral district in the 2019 Ukrainian parliamentary election as a member of Servant of the People. At the time of her election, she was an independent. According to analytical portal Slovo i Dilo, by February 2021 Lys had fulfilled 23% of her electoral promises, having promised to increase teacher salaries, create a national agency for qualifying education workers, improve the development of transportation in the city of Chernivtsi, and improve the city's sewage system.

Member of the Verkhovna Rada Committee on Education, Science and Innovation, Head of the Subcommittee on General Secondary, Inclusive Education and Education in the Temporarily Occupied Territories.

One of the initiators of the Draft Law on Amendments to the Code of Ukraine on Administrative Offenses regarding liability for propaganda of homosexuality and transgenderism.
