= David Greetham (cricketer) =

English cricketer (born 1975)

Personal information
- Full name: David James Greetham
- Born: 10 July 1975 (age 51); Liss, Hampshire, England
- Batting: Right-handed
- Bowling: Right-arm medium-fast

Domestic team information
- Years: Team
- 2001–2002: Hampshire Cricket Board

Career statistics
Competition	LA
Matches	3
Runs scored	8
Batting average	4.00
100s/50s	0/0
Top score	6*
Balls bowled	120
Wickets	2
Bowling average	52.00
5 wickets in innings	0
10 wickets in match	0
Best bowling	2/52
Catches/stumpings	3/–
- Source: Cricinfo, 29 December 2009

David James Greetham (born 10 July 1975) is a former English cricketer. He was a right-handed batsman and right-arm medium-fast bowler who played for the Hampshire Cricket Board. He was born at Liss, Hampshire in 1975.

Greetham made his debut for the side during the 2001 38-County Cup, taking figures of 2–1 from 3.5 overs in his second of two matches in the competition.

Greetham made his List-A debut in the 2002 Cheltenham & Gloucester Trophy in September 2001 against Ireland, taking the first two wickets of the Ireland innings, and contributing two runs with the bat.

Greetham made two further List A matches in the 2003 Cheltenham & Gloucester Trophy, scoring six runs in his first match in the competition and a duck in the second and final match of his career against Staffordshire.

During the 2006 season, Greetham played for Hursley Park in the Southern Premier Cricket League, though the team finished second-bottom of the table.
