= Louse Creek (Missouri) =

Stream in the American state of Missouri

Louse Creek is a stream in southern Oregon County in the Ozarks of southern Missouri. It is a tributary of Frederick Creek.

The stream headwaters are at 36°32′00″N 91°21′10″W and the confluence with Frederick Creek is at 36°34′56″N 91°18′37″W. The stream source area lies north of Missouri Route 142 and it flows northeast crossing under Missouri Route E and joins Frederick Creek east of Garfield.

Louse Creek was so named on account of the poor hygiene of the locals near its course.

== See also ==
- List of rivers of Missouri
