= Plestor House, Liss =

Coordinates: 51°03′01″N 0°54′04″W

Plestor House is a Grade II listed building in the village of Liss, Hampshire, only a few miles from Selborne. The house has served a variety of purposes in its past, ranging from housing different types of storefronts to being an office building. From July 2001 to August 2008, it was the headquarters for a local company, which described it as being "a building typical of the end of the 1600s or early 1700s with its symmetrical brick façade and sash windows[...] [A]n important location for villagers to communicate and exchanges ideas with each other".
