= Hog louse =

Hog louse may mean:

- Hog louse, Haematopinus suis, a large parasitic louse living on the skin of domestic swine
- Hog-louse or water hog-louse, applied to freshwater isopod crustaceans in the family Asellidae
- Hog-louse or woodlouse, any of the many species of terrestrial isopod crustaceans in the suborder Oniscidea
