= Liss, Hampshire =

Village and civil parish in Hampshire, England

Coordinates: 51.04290°N 0.89184°W

Liss
- Location within Hampshire
- Population: 6,291 (2011 Census)
- OS grid reference: SU785275
- Civil parish: Liss
- District: East Hampshire
- Shire county: Hampshire
- Region: South East
- Country: England
- Sovereign state: United Kingdom
- Post town: LISS
- Postcode district: GU33
- Dialling code: 01730
- Police: Hampshire and Isle of Wight
- Fire: Hampshire and Isle of Wight
- Ambulance: South Central
- UK Parliament: East Hampshire

Liss (previously spelt Lys or Lyss) is a village and civil parish in the East Hampshire district of Hampshire, 3.3 miles (5.3 km) north-east of Petersfield, on the A3 road, on the West Sussex border. It covers 3,567 acres (14 km^{2}) of semi-rural countryside in the South Downs National Park. Liss railway station is on the Portsmouth Direct line. The village comprises an old village at West Liss and a modern village round the 19th-century station. They are divided by the River Rother. Suburbs later spread towards Liss Forest.

== Heritage ==
=== Prehistory ===
Flint spearheads, arrowheads, scrapers, flakes and cores dating from Palaeolithic and Mesolithic times have been found.

Evidence of Neolithic activity is present in axe heads and flint implements. An Irish decorated axe and two bracelets engraved with parallel lines and chevrons have been found, and there are plentiful Bronze Age features on the chalk hangers above the village and at Berry Grove, the Wylds and at Peacewood, Farther Common. There was settlement in the Rother Valley by the Bronze Age. Bowl barrows and other Bronze Age features exist at Berry Grove (bowl barrow located in the garden, 12 m in diameter and 1.5 m high, with two large oaks growing on it), the Wylds (bowl barrow 23.0 m in diameter, and 2.0 m high, surrounded by a tree ring of dry stone walling planted with fir trees; traces of human and animal hair were found in a tree trunk coffin burial), and at Peacewood, Farther Common (an almost circular enclosure on a slight northern slope, containing trees).

=== Roman archaeology ===
There is evidence of Roman settlement in Liss.

=== Saxons ===
No direct evidence of habitation or Anglo-Saxon architecture exists in the current Liss village area, and the early Saxon period is also slightly represented archaeologically in the whole area of East Hampshire. It seems unlikely that there was any major community on the site of the original or the current villages.

However, the comparative remoteness was useful when in the late Saxon at 900 Alfred the Great created an Abbey at Lyss Place under the control of St. Mary's Abbey at Winchester as a retreat for nuns.

In the time of Edward the Confessor (1042–1066), the penultimate Anglo-Saxon king, there was a mill in operation at Liss paying an annual rent.

Local historians indicate their belief that St Peter's Church has Saxon footings, and that the remaining plan reflects an earlier Saxon Church on the site. However, Taylor and Taylor do not list St Stephen's and no fabric is evident. Hopefully future opportunities for specialist archaeological work will clarify the order of construction.

=== Norman period ===
The earliest written mention of Liss (as Lyss or Lis) may be that found in the 1086 Domesday Book in the Hundred of Meonstoke.

At the time of the Domesday Survey, the manor of Liss might have formed part of the original endowment of the Abbey of St. Mary at Winchester. The manor was later known as Liss Abbess, and the Abbess and nuns of Winchester kept the land until the Dissolution of the Monasteries in 1538.

The earliest wooden church is normally regarded as one of the two churches mentioned as being held by two priests of the manor of Odiham in Domesday Book. It would have been deeded by King Stephen, with the churches of Bentworth and Odiham for the master of the Choristers' School of Salisbury and the chancellor of the cathedral.

=== 13th century on ===
The village centre in what is now West Liss around Church Street and the nearby triangular patch of ground, the Plestor (derived from 'playstow', or playground – see Plestor House). The Village Stocks were sited here, near an ancient oak which, now entirely hollow, remains in front of the current Spread Eagle Inn.

Liss developed economically in the three centuries following Domesday although being of limited significance politically or economically other than in relation to the monastic establishment at Lyss Place. Part of Liss Place Farm, West Liss. dates from the 14th century with an addition of 19th-century date, and a prosperous farming community can reasonably be assumed. Farms existed throughout the parish. To the East, timber-framed houses and farms were constructed in the 17th and 18th centuries.

A traditional fair was held in May in the field between the Spread Eagle Inn and Church Street, opposite the glebe meadow where Liss Cricket Club now plays.

Serving the community, St Peter's Church, (West) Liss, was built in stone in the 13th century, replacing the earlier timber structure. The Chancel, parts of tower, and octagonal piers of arcade date from C.13. The existing Octagonal font, mullioned and transomed window in south aisle and indeed the distinctive weatherboard top stage of tower are later.

Liss Church was attached to the church of Odiham which appointed the curate-in-charge and remained so until 1867 when it was separated and the Rev. W. French, who had been the curate, was appointed the first Rector of Liss by the Bishop of Winchester.

The manor, Liss Abbess, remained in the hands of the Abbess and nuns of Winchester until the Dissolution of the Monasteries in 1538. It then remained Crown property until about 1610. The monastic establishment at Lyss Place then passed into private ownership and was subsequently held variously by the Cole, Fitzpatrick, Taylor and Hawkshaw families.

One route of the Pilgrims' Way between Winchester and Canterbury passes through Stodham, Balls Farm, Woodlands Farm, Barn Place Farm, Ciddy Hall Farm, Palmers Farm (resting place for pilgrims), Reeds Farm leaving the parish past Brewells Farm.

=== Victorian period ===
Liss remained primarily an agricultural village in an open setting, but became known in the 19th century for the production of peppermint, an industry sponsored by the Money family of Stodham Park. The mint was grown, distilled and sold at 4d a pint.

Stodham Park House was built about 1820 as part of the Money family Estate. It has three storeys and a basement with an imposing four-pillared porch with steps to the main door. Clara Maria Burdett married into the Money-Coutts of Stodham Park (died 22 December 1899) and lived at the house. The family donated the existing Village Hall.

The village was radically altered in 19th century, essentially being moved eastwards by new developments. The newer centre is late Victorian in character. The Southern Railway came from the North East to East Liss (and then along the Rother Valley towards Portsmouth) in 1859. East Liss became the Village of Liss.

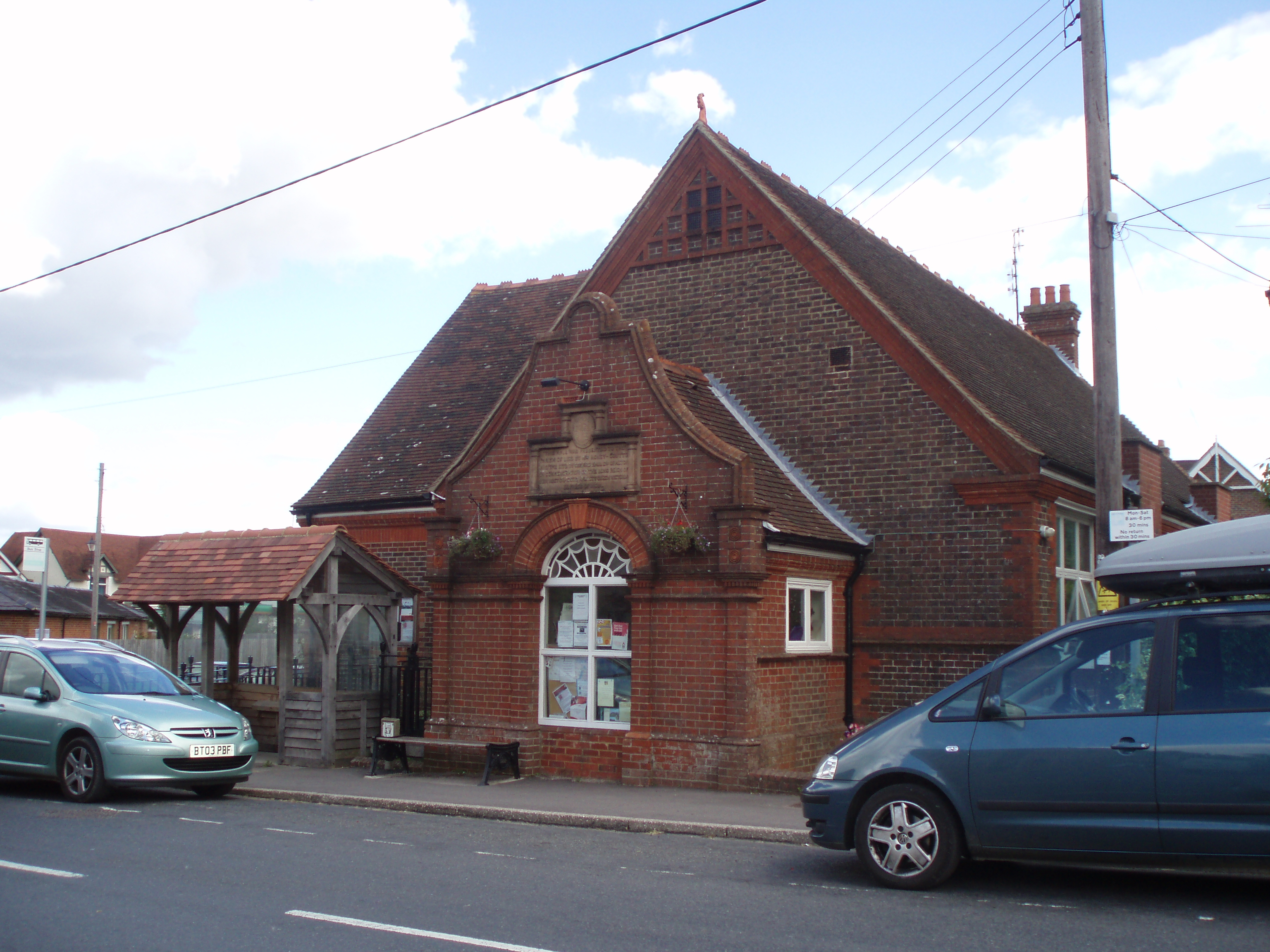
Village hall

The enclosure of the commons and wastelands occurred by an inclosure act in 1864. Station Road, St Mary's Road, Western Road, the shopping area, the beginning of Hill Brow Road, Andlers Ash Road, Liss Forest Road, Mint Road, the original village school and the Village Hall were all built on enclosed land. Under the Inclosure Award the West Liss Recreation Ground, the four allotments sites "for the labouring poor of the parish" and a number of roads were created. Under the local-government reforms of 1894, management of the village's affairs passed from Vestry to the new Parish Council.

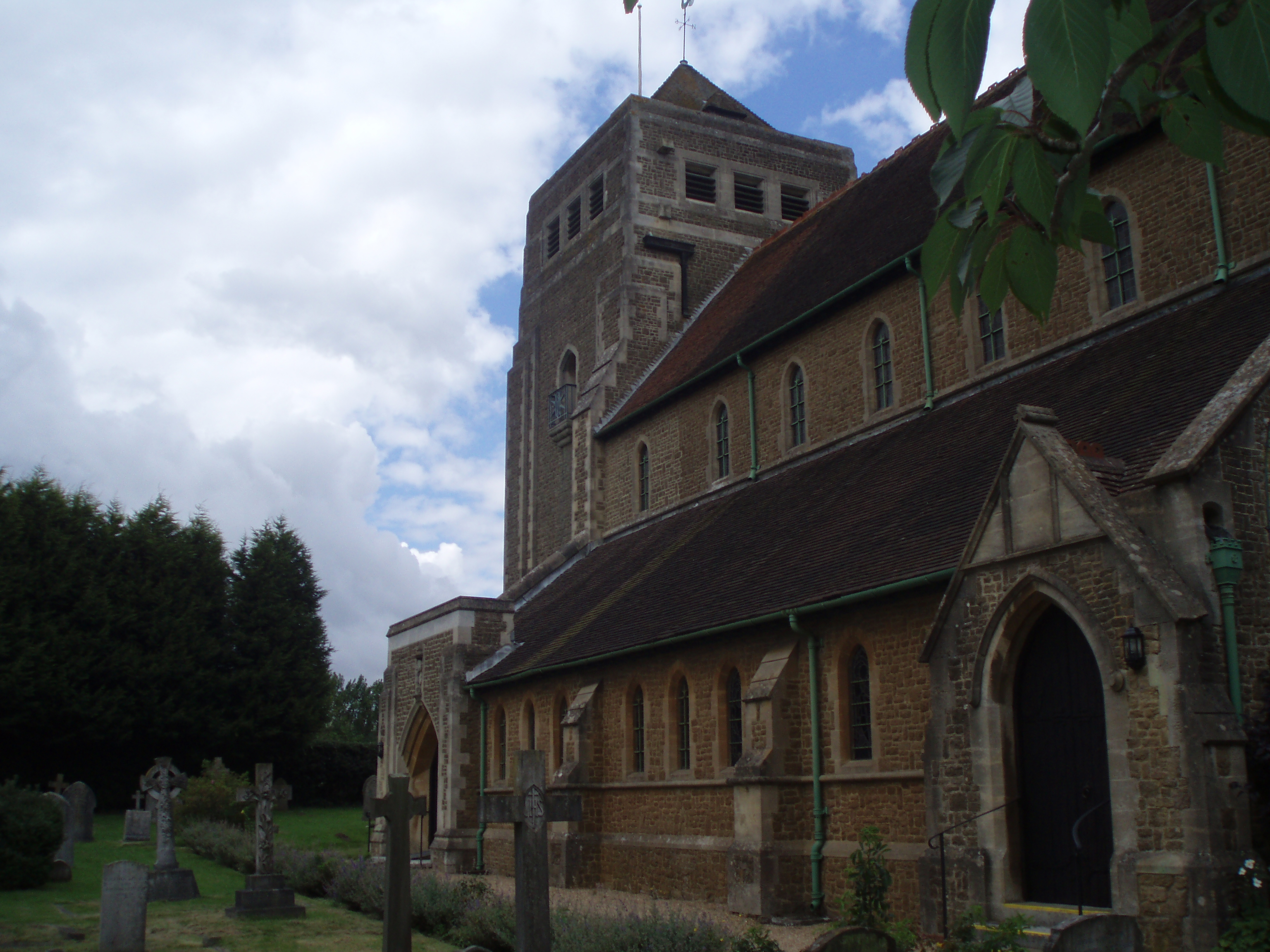
Parish church of St Mary

St Mary's Church was built in 1892–94 (Arthur Blomfield) to serve the new parts of the village, replacing St Peter at West Liss, which remains an intact 13th-century structure with its few later additions. The original construction of St Mary's consisted of a chancel with a north transept for the organ and a vestry, and a nave with north and south aisles and a north porch in plain 13th-century style. It is built of local sandstone with dressed quoins, with brick lining.

The tower, designed by Edward Maufe (well known for his work at Guildford Cathedral) was completed in 1932, and a ring of eight bells was cast in 1937 by the firm Mears & Stainbank at Whitechapel Bell Foundry. The bells are hung for traditional Change ringing, and the heaviest weighs 630kg (12cwt-1qtr-16lbs).

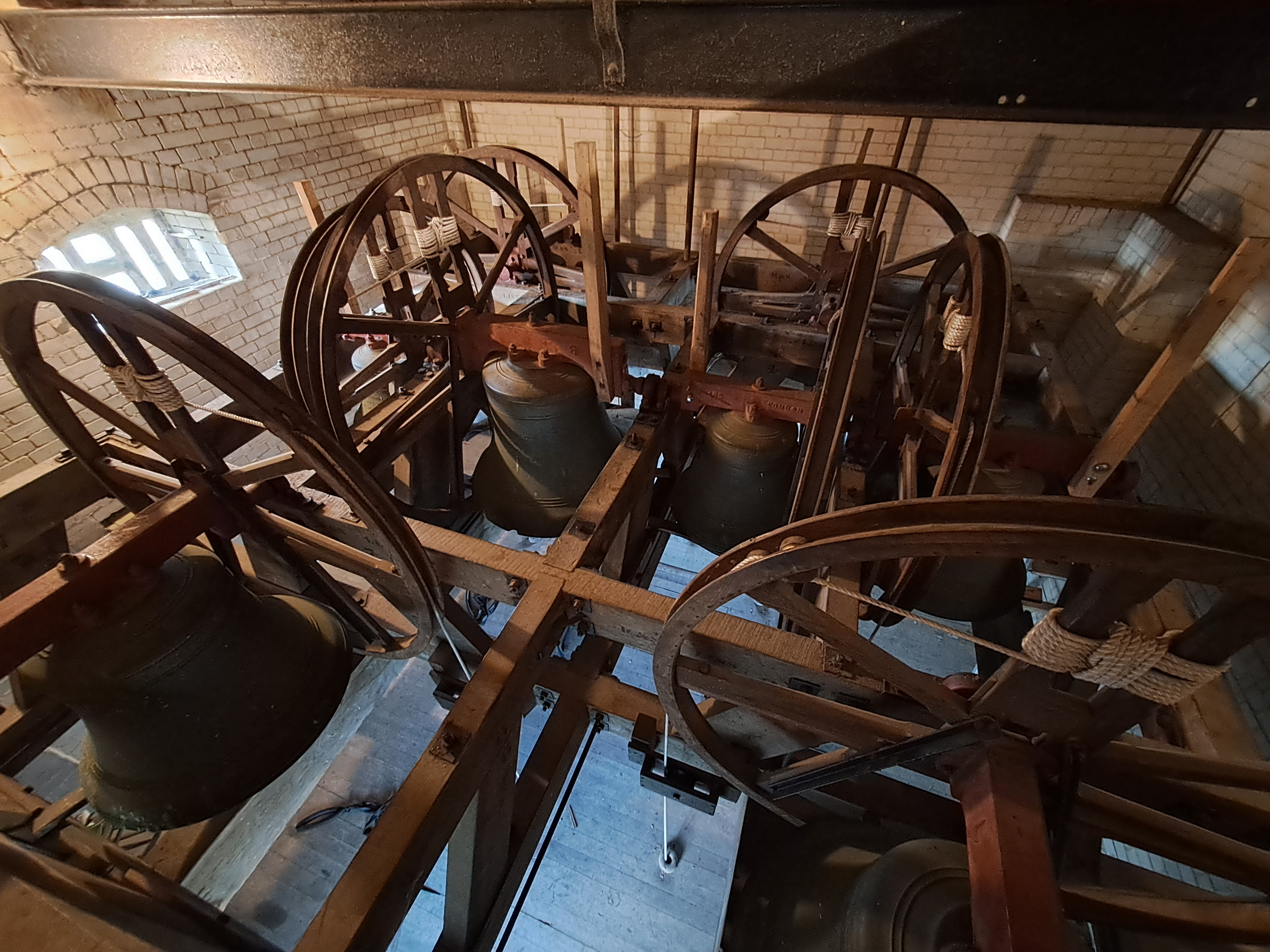
The eight bells in the tower of St Mary's Church, Liss, Hants.

The Education Board Schools were built in 1872, and enlarged in 1878 and again in 1888.

In 1911, an iron mission hall is recorded at Hill Brow with a Wesleyan chapel at East Liss, and for Plymouth Brethren a meeting-house at West Liss.

=== Military railway ===
In 1933 a military railway known as the Longmoor Military Railway was built from Liss Station to the Longmoor Military Camp. This caused a further increase in population. The railway was used as a set for many films including The Great St Trinian's Train Robbery and Chitty Chitty Bang Bang.

In light of the reducing role of the British military in the 1960s, it was decided by the Ministry of Defence to close the railway. Local locomotive preservation groups, on hearing of its impending closure, became interested in acquiring the complete rail system to establish a unique transport museum. Bids were placed to purchase the LMR along with the airstrip at Gypsy Hollow. However the MOD rejected the proposal, although it was backed by the Association of Railway Preservation Societies and The Transport Trust. Instead the Army offered to hand over the last 1½ miles of line from Liss Forest Road to Liss. The offer was accepted by the societies and a provisional lease was drawn up while planning permission was sought for developments at Liss.

However some in Liss did not share the enthusiasm for a rail museum and opposed the planning permission. A residents group raised £9,100 in a successful bid to buy this last piece of line. Longmoor Military Railway closed down with a ceremonial last day of operation on 31 October 1969, though for another two years some locomotives and stock remained on site, and there were occasional movements. Three items of rolling stock (a van, a brake van, and a bogie flat) still remain on the Longmoor site as part of the FIBUA training village.

=== Modern period ===
Immediately after World War II, local authority housing was built in East Liss under the William Beveridge programmes. Since the mid-1960s, a number of large new estates have extended the village and increased its population. The 1965 Harcos development at Patrick's Copse and Greenfields etc. has been extended several times since the 1970s to cover existing landscaped open ground and traditional marshland.

The early estates contain houses of different sizes, and initially of uniform 1960s estate style. Such development is now subject to much criticism in relation to local architectural style and appropriate rural village design (see Poundbury Village, Dorchester). Newer, and smaller developments on brownfield sites have been necessitated by increasing population pressure, and government policy which continues.

In the early 1990s Liss Junior School moved from its central village location to a site 300 yards from the village centre on the Hill Brow Road. Some of the old school building has been reused as the Triangle Centre; other buildings were demolished to make way for new housing and playing fields. The mid-1990s junior school was designed by Hampshire County Council's Architecture and Design Service.

In the 1980s new red brick shopping areas and housing have extended the centre of the village where rough grazing for horses previously existed, and added a new supermarket unit, other shops and office space. The 1920s white façade of Smiths Garage nearby, has recently (2007) been demolished and the land cleared for new housing completed in 2016.

The Village Hall was modernised and a green oak bus shelter added in 2006. Hampshire County Council's Mobile Library Service has served Liss since the 1960s. There are three East Hampshire District Council car parks in Liss.

- Station Road Car Park, Station Road, Liss
- Village Centre Car Park (short stay), Station Road
- Hill Brow Car Park, Hill Brow Road (used by the mobile library)

The construction of the Petersfield & Liphook bypass (A3 road) as a four-lane limited-access dual carriageway past West Liss, has removed much through traffic from the centres of Petersfield and Liphook, and some traffic from the old A3 (now the B2070) and Farnham Rd, West Liss (formerly part of the A325 between Petersfield and Farnham).

The large "Ham Barn" roundabout has been created to distribute vehicles from the A3 on the B3006 towards Liss and Selborne. Areas of West Liss are now close to the carriageways, which has changed their rural and medieval character. Dependent on the wind direction, the sound from the road can be heard in East and West Liss and throughout the area, in the Hangars and Hill Brow. Environmental damage and limited effectiveness of new road building has been predicted by groups such as Road Alert.

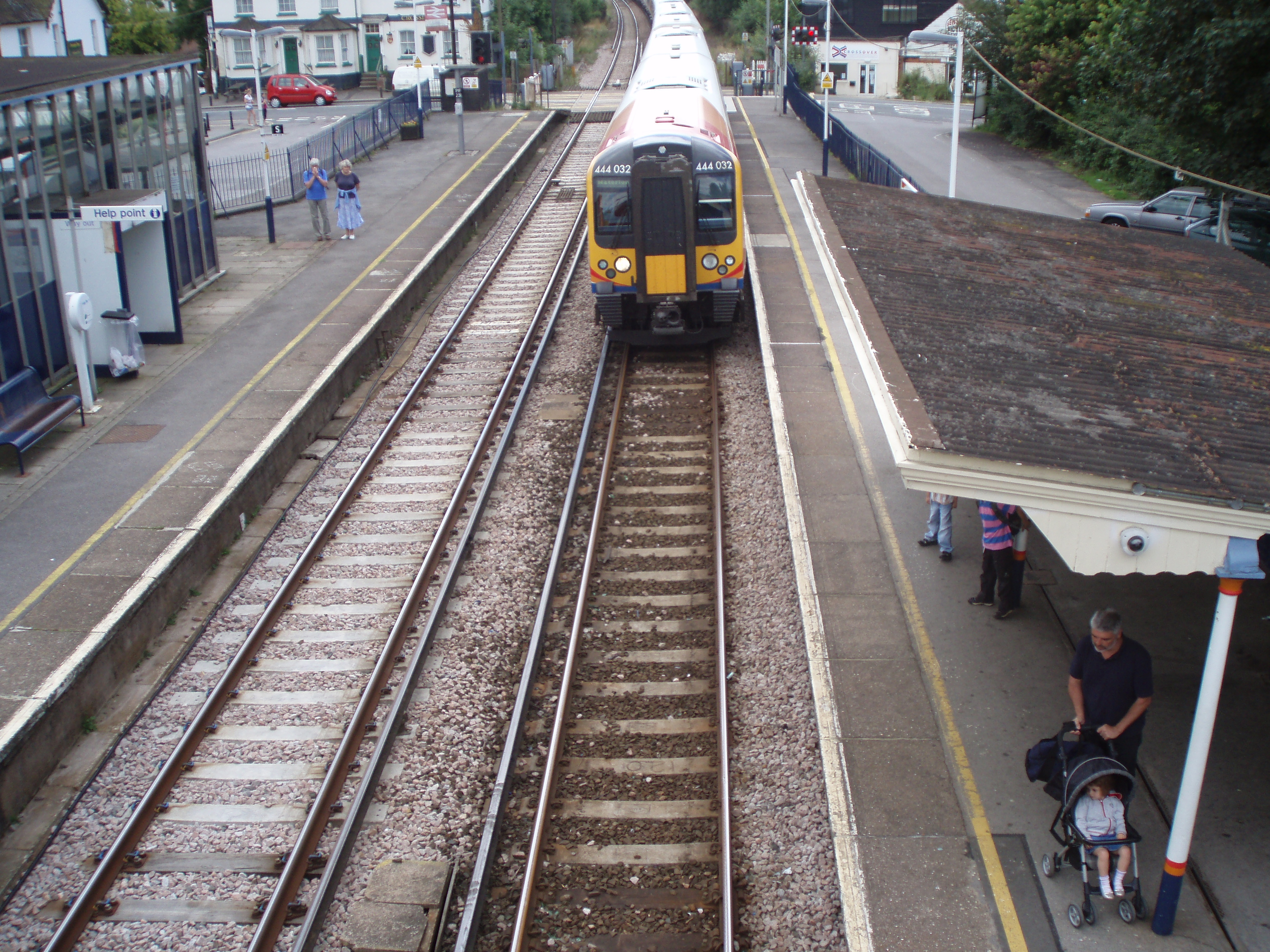
Liss train station

The population of Liss is approximately 6,000. It is assumed that the demographic profile has shifted from a largely rural base to accommodate commuters due to good road (A3) and railway (Portsmouth Direct Line) links to London. Liss is served by Liss railway station.

The local newspapers are the broadsheet Petersfield Herald, and the tabloid Petersfield Post.

=== Listed buildings ===
There are 23 listed buildings in the civil parish.

== Education ==
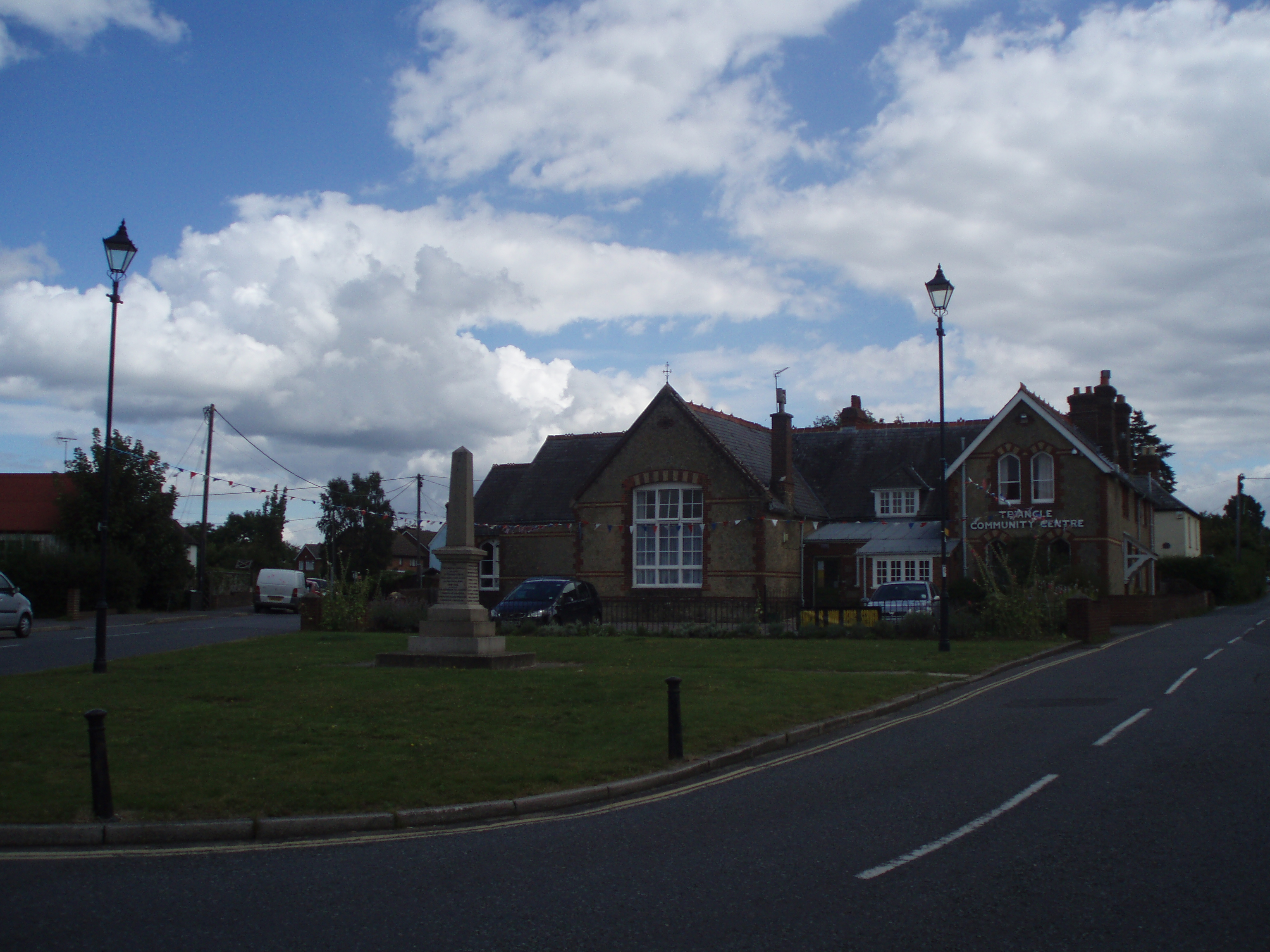
Old school and war memorial

Liss Infants School caters for children aged 4–7, (years R–2). The school is federated with Liss Junior School, which is on the same site. Liss Junior school is a state school catering for children aged 7–11 (years 3–6). This was opened in 1994 after moving from the centre of the village. Both schools have a Resourced Provision which cater for children with moderate learning difficulties. There are a number of pre-school nurseries. One situated in the Triangle Community Centre was previously the village school.

== Sport and leisure ==
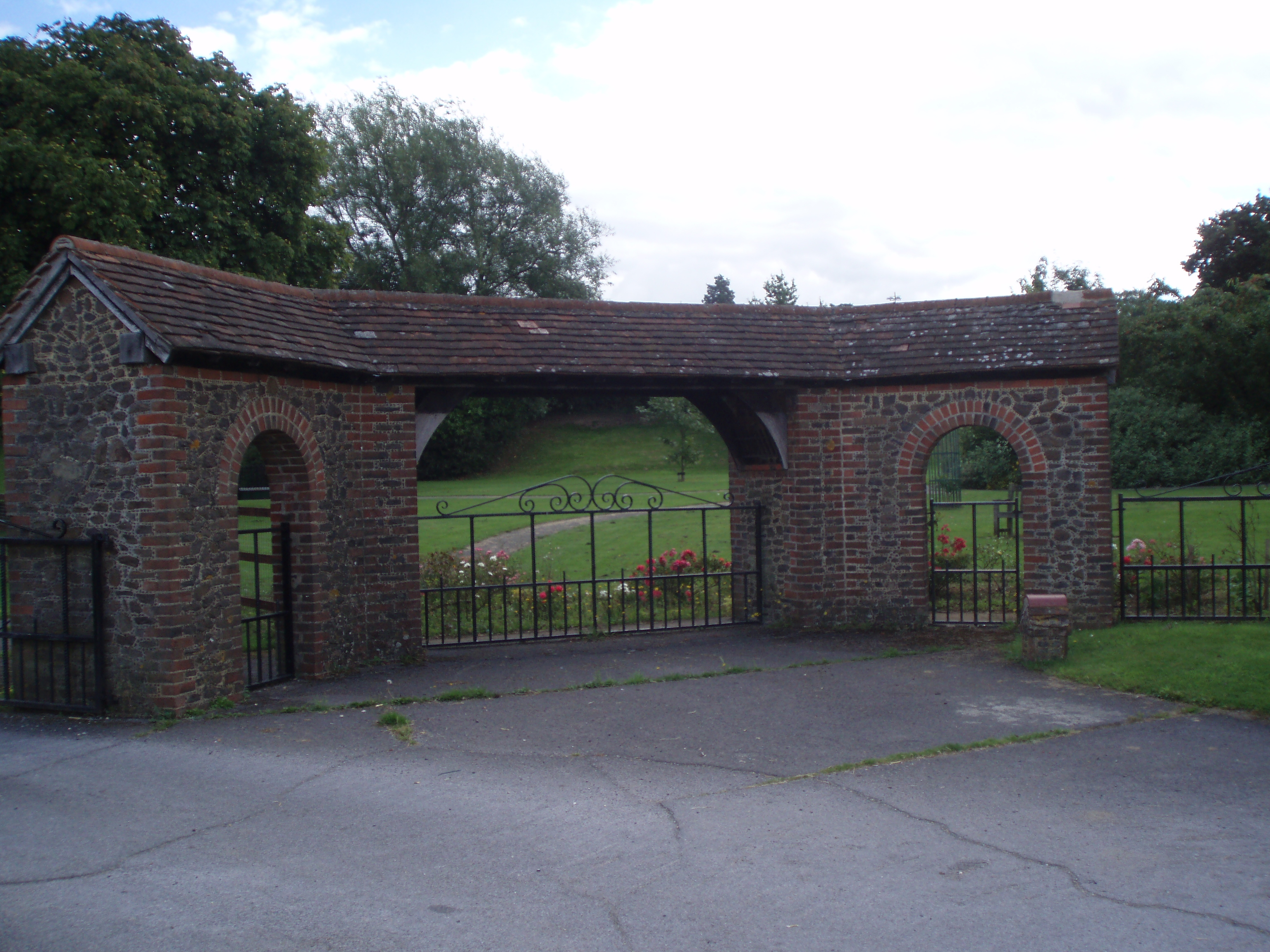
Entrance to Newman Collard Park

Liss has a Non-League football club Liss Athletic F.C., which plays at The Newman Collard Park. Liss has a successful Road Running Club, Liss Runners, and a long-established cricket club. There is also a tennis club, the Newman Collard, and a new Petersfield Golf Club on the site of Tankerdale Farm. The sports and other amenities in Liss are being improved by the charity the Newman Collard Pavilion Fund.

== Notable residents ==
- Gary Bond (1940–1995), actor
- Rosine de Bounevialle (1916-1999), who lived for much of her life in Liss Forest, writer and magazine editor.
- Tanya Brady (1973–2022), rower, died in Liss
- Richard Dering (c. 1580 – 1630), composer
- David Greetham (born 1975), cricketer
- Ian Hay (1876–1952), novelist and playwright, died in Liss.
- Michael John Hurd (1928–2006), composer and author
- Selwyn Jepson (1899–1989), author and screenwriter
- Cliff Lazarenko (born 1952), professional darts player
- Richard Purchase (1757–1837), cricketer
- Francis Rose (1921–2006), botanist
- Monica Storrs (1888–1967), pioneer and missionary, lived in Liss.
- Henryk Zygalski (1908-1978) Polish mathematician and cryptologists who in 1932 co-broke German Enigma ciphers and worked on in that field during World War II, died in Liss.
