= Gate lice =

Airport passengers waiting at boarding gates early

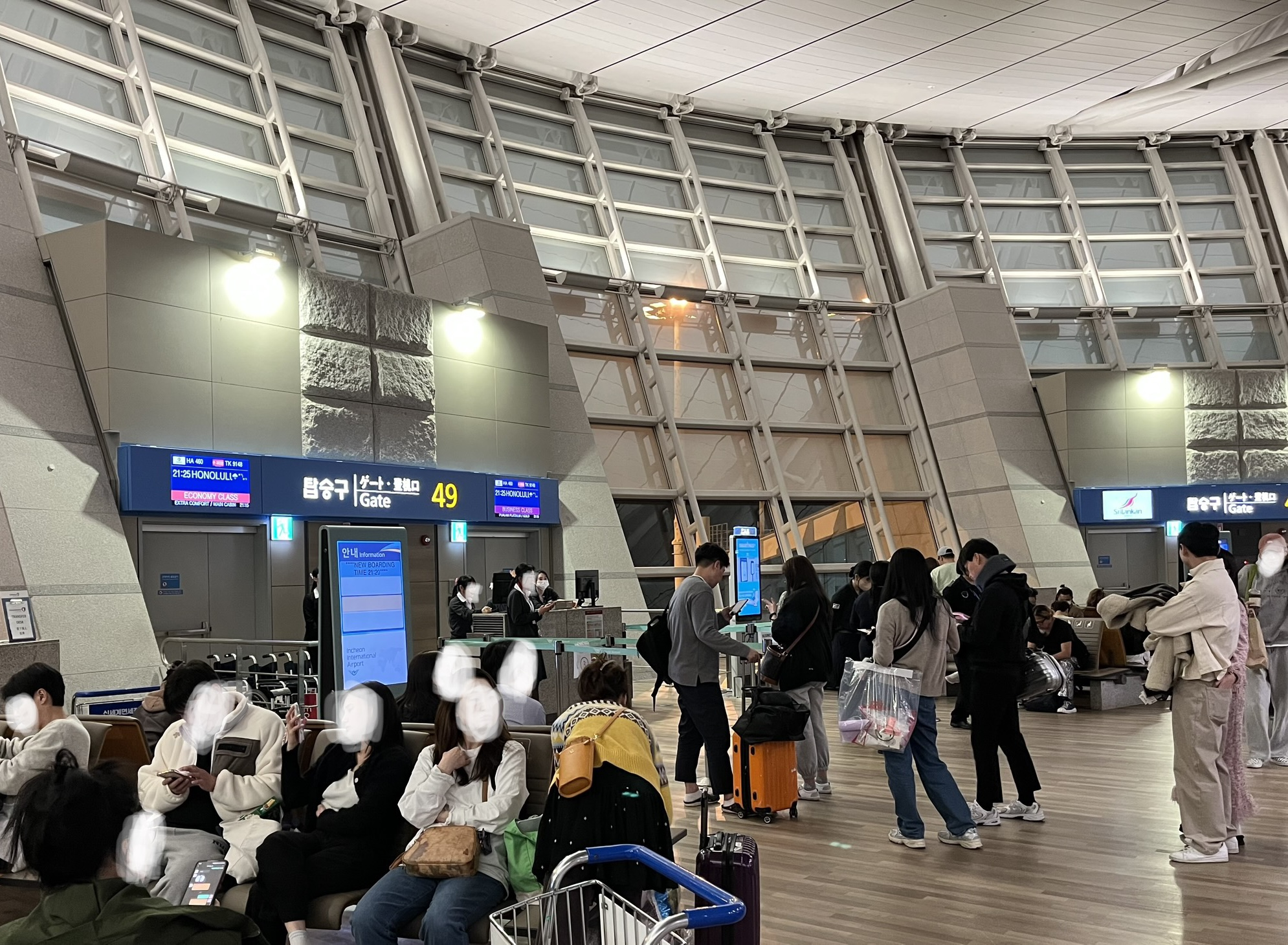
The individuals waiting around the boarding area before their designated boarding time are sometimes called gate lice

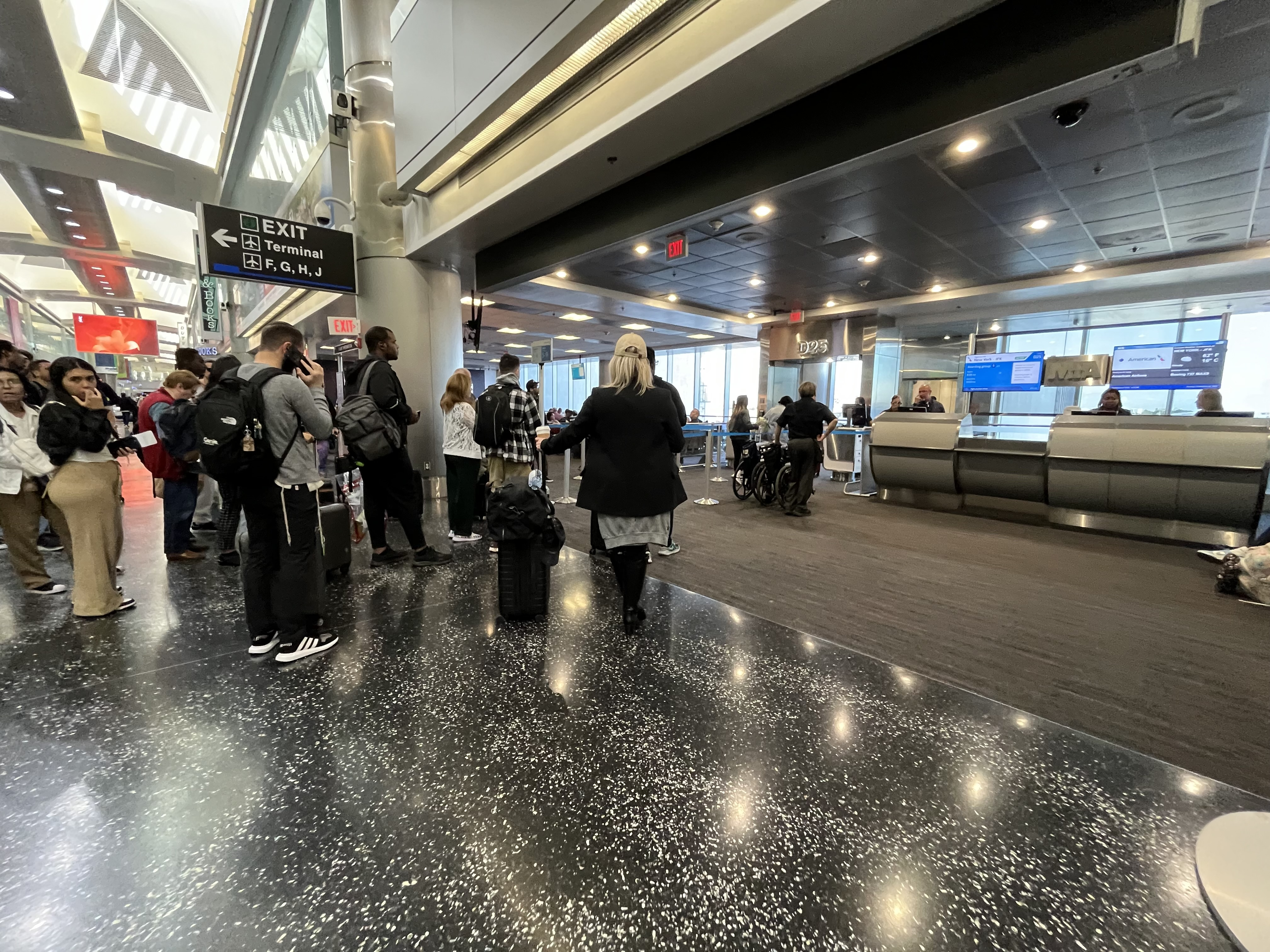
Phenomenon at Miami International Airport

Gate lice is a pejorative term used to describe a phenomenon observed among air travelers where passengers gather in front of boarding gates before their designated boarding time. The term has gained recognition within the community of frequent flyers, particularly on platforms such as Flyertalk. This phenomenon may make the boarding process more cumbersome. For instance, it can lead to congestion, longer wait times for those who have prioritized boarding, and confusion. To avoid behaving in this manner, it is recommended to remain in one's seat until one's boarding group is called.

== Contributing factors ==
The rationale for gate lice behavior may be due to various contributing factors. Some attribute it to the inexperience of certain travelers who may not fully comprehend airline boarding procedures. Additionally, the presence of elite fliers with priority boarding privileges board early, forming clusters in front of the gate and contributing to congestion. Airport gate designs can also play a role, for example at O'Hare International Airport gate layouts are conducive for congestion. The baggage fees may also play a role, as some passengers may seek to board early to secure overhead bin space to potentially avoid fees. Also, people may seek the overhead bin space to avoid lost luggage. In some cases, people may seek overhead bin space to store items required on the flight.

Psychological factors may also play a role. When people see other people crowding the boarding area, there may be a social tendency to move towards conformity. Also, the overhead bin space may be viewed as a limited resource leading to competition. The underlying uncertainty and competition may lead to anxiety and hostility. Waiting in line may also help bring a sense of control as well as relieve anxiety.

Following the COVID-19 pandemic, the phenomenon has increased possibly as travelers have become more anxious.

== Industry response ==
Some airlines have implemented measures to address the challenges posed by gate lice. This includes the creation of dedicated lanes for elite flyers and the removal of special pre-boarding privileges for families with small children. Various airlines, such as United, American, Delta, and Southwest, have introduced priority boarding programs catering to specific customer groups.

As of October 2024, American Airlines was testing a program in several U.S. airports that alerts gate agents to passengers who attempt to board before their assigned boarding group. The system creates an audible signal when the passenger's boarding pass is scanned before their boarding group is called.
