= Lisses =

Commune in Île-de-France, France

- Commune
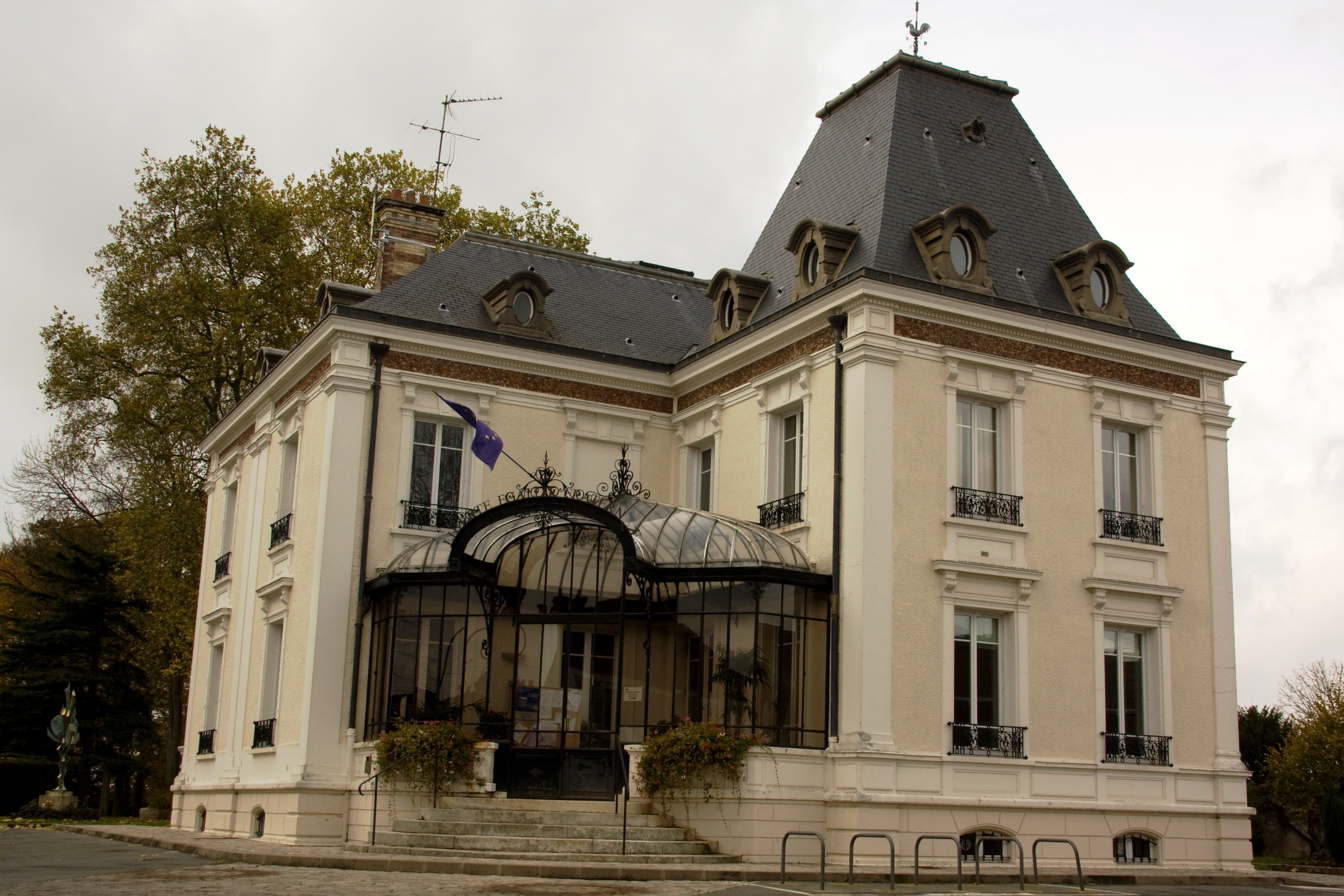
- The town hall in Lisses
- Location of Lisses
- Location within France Location within Île-de-France (region)
- Coordinates: 48°35′53″N 2°25′28″E
- Country: France
- Region: Île-de-France
- Department: Essonne
- Arrondissement: Évry
- Canton: Corbeil-Essonnes
- Intercommunality: CA Grand Paris Sud Seine-Essonne-Sénart

Government
  - Mayor (2024–2026): Jean-Marc Morin
- Area^{1}: 10.40 km^{2} (4.02 sq mi)
- Highest elevation: 89 m (292 ft)
- Lowest elevation: 38 m (125 ft)
- Population (2023): 7,373
  - Density: 708.9/km^{2} (1,836/sq mi)
- Time zone: UTC+01:00 (CET)
  - Summer (DST): UTC+02:00 (CEST)
- INSEE/Postal code: 91340 /91090
- ^{1} French Land Register data, which excludes lakes, ponds, glaciers > 1 km^{2} (0.386 sq mi or 247 acres) and river estuaries.

Lisses (French pronunciation: [lis]) is a commune in the Essonne department in Île-de-France in northern France.

== Origin of the city name ==
The name origin of this commune is not well known. One hypothesis is that Lisses is coming from the Latin Licia villa, as the initial village developed around the Lisses estate. Another hypothesis is that Lisses has German origins: Listja, meaning barrier. This commune was created in 1793 under its current name.

== Population ==
Historical population
Year	Pop.	±% p.a.
1968	681	—
1975	738	+1.15%
1982	4,343	+28.81%
1990	6,860	+5.88%
1999	7,206	+0.55%
2007	6,871	−0.59%
2012	7,447	+1.62%
2017	7,445	−0.01%
2023	7,373	−0.16%
Source: INSEE

== Twin city ==
Lisses is partnered with Aue-Fallstein in Germany.

== Education ==
The commune has three primary school groups (combined preschool and elementary school), Frédéric Mistral, Jean-Baptiste Corot, and Joachim du Bellay; as well as one junior high school, Collège Rosa Luxemburg.

== Lisses in art and culture ==
- The name of this commune is used to identify a rest area on the A6 motorway
- Parkour was developed in Lisses and nearby Courcouronnes, having been created by David Belle, who has resided in Lisses since the 1980s.

== See also ==
- Communes of the Essonne department
