= List of water deities =

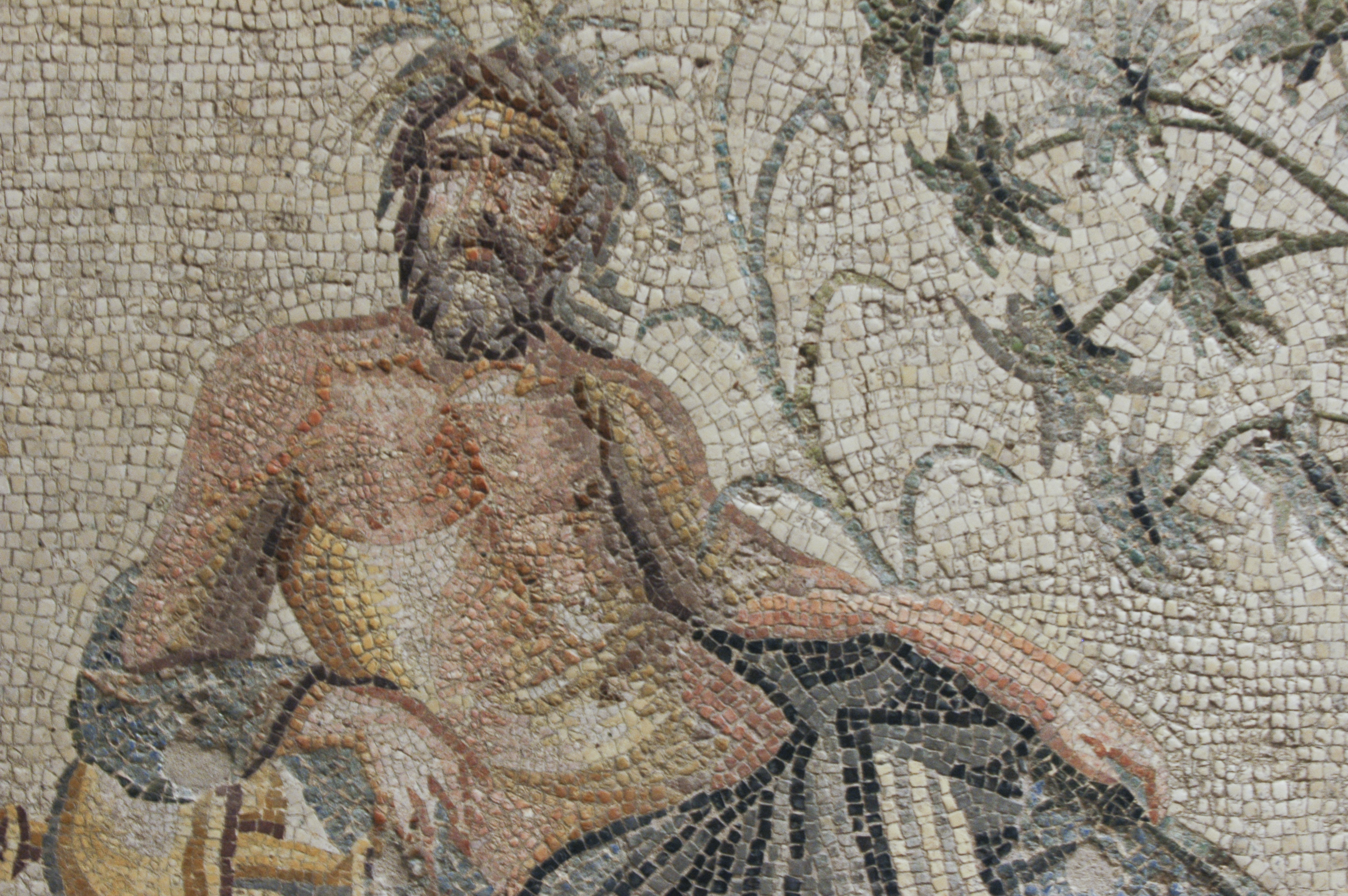
Water god in an ancient Roman mosaic. Zeugma Mosaic Museum, Gaziantep, Turkey

A water deity is a deity in mythology associated with water or various bodies of water. Water deities are common in mythology and were usually more important among civilizations in which the sea or ocean, or a great river was more important. Another important focus of worship of water deities has been springs or holy wells.

As a form of animal worship, whales and snakes (hence dragons) have been regarded as godly deities throughout the world (as are other animals such as turtles, fish, crabs, and sharks). In Asian lore, whales and dragons sometimes have connections. Serpents are also common as a symbol or as serpentine deities, sharing many similarities with dragons.

== Africa ==
=== Akan ===
- Bosompo, primordial embodiment of the oceans
- Abena Mansa, sea goddess associated with gold
- Ashiakle, goddess of the treasures at the bottom of the ocean
- Tano (Ta Kora), god of the Tano river
- Bia, god of the Bia river
- Birim, goddess of the Birim River
- Bosomtwe, antelope god of the Bosomtwe River
- Ayensu, god of the Ayensu River
- Densu, three headed god of the Densu River, often represented as red, and having a bad temper

=== Bantu ===
- Bunzi, goddess of rain, rainbow and waters.
- Chicamassichinuinji, king of oceans.
- Funza, goddess of waters, twin phenomenon and malformations in children. Wife of Mbumba.
- Jengu, Sawabantu water spirits
- Kalunga, Bantu Supreme Creator
- Kimbazi, goddess of sea storms.
- Kuitikuiti, serpent god of Congo river.
- Lusunzi, god of spring and waters.
- Mamba Muntu, goddesses of waters and sexuality.
- Makanga.
- Mbantilanda.
- Mbumba, rainbow serpent of terrestrial waters and warriors.
- Mboze.
- Mpulu Bunzi, Bakongo god of rain and waters.
- Nyami Nyami, Batonga river spirit
- Simbi, Bakongo ancestral water spirits

=== Dahomey ===
- Erzulie, goddess of sweet water, beauty, and love.

=== Dogon ===
- Nommos, amphibious spirits that are worshipped as ancestors.

=== Egypt ===
- Anuket, goddess of the Nile and nourisher of the fields.
- Bairthy, goddess of water, was depicted with a small pitcher on her head, holding a long spear-like sceptre.
- Hapi, god of the annual flooding of the Nile.
- Heh, frog headed god of the primordial waters.
- Heqet, wife of Khnum, also with the head of a frog.
- Khnum, god of the source of the Nile.
- Nephthys, goddess of rivers, death, mourning, the dead, and night.
- Nu, uncreated god, personification of the primordial waters.
- Osiris, god of the dead and afterlife; originally a god of water and vegetation.
- Satet, goddess of the Nile River's floods.
- Sobek, god of the Nile river, is depicted as a crocodile or a man with the head of a crocodile.
- Tefnut, goddess of water, moisture, and fertility.
- Wadj-wer, personification of the Mediterranean Sea or represented the lagoons and lakes in the northernmost Nile Delta.

=== Ewe / Fon ===
- Agwé, a sea loa.
- Clermeil, a river loa.
- Mami Wata, a water loa.
- Pie, a lake and river loa.

=== Lugandan ===
- Sezibwa, goddess of the Sezibwa River.

=== Serer ===
- Mindiss (or Mindis) is not a deity in Serer religion, but a pangool with goddess–like attributes. She is a female protector of the Fatick Region. Offerings are made in her name at the River Sine. She appears to humans in the form of a manatee, She is one of the best known fangool (singular of pangool). She possess the attributes of a typical water fangool, yet at the same time, she is a blood fangool. The Senegalese Ministry of Culture added the Mbind Ngo Mindiss site to its list of monuments and historic sites in Fatick. It is the site where offerings are made, situated on the arms of the sea which bears her name, in the Sine.

=== Yoruba ===
- Oshun, an orisha of fresh "sweet" waters and the Osun River.
- Olokun, an ocean orisha. In Yoruba religion they are the deity of all waters.
- Yemoja, originally the orisha of the Ogun River (largest river in Yorubaland) but became the orisha over the sea waves by way of the Trans-Atlantic Slave Trade. In some traditional myths she aided Ọbatala with the creation of humans.
- Olosa, consort of Olokun, orisha over lagoons.
- Ọya, orisha of storms and the Niger River.
- Ọba, orisha of the Oba River.
- Yewá, orisha of the Yewa River.
- Otin, orisha of the Otin River.
- Yemòó, original wife of Ọbatala and orisha over waters and maternity. Said to be the original form of most female water orishas.

=== Igbo ===
- Nmuo Mmiri or Nne Mmiri, The Water goddess.

== Asia-Pacific and Oceania ==
=== East Asia ===
==== Taoism and Chinese folk religion ====
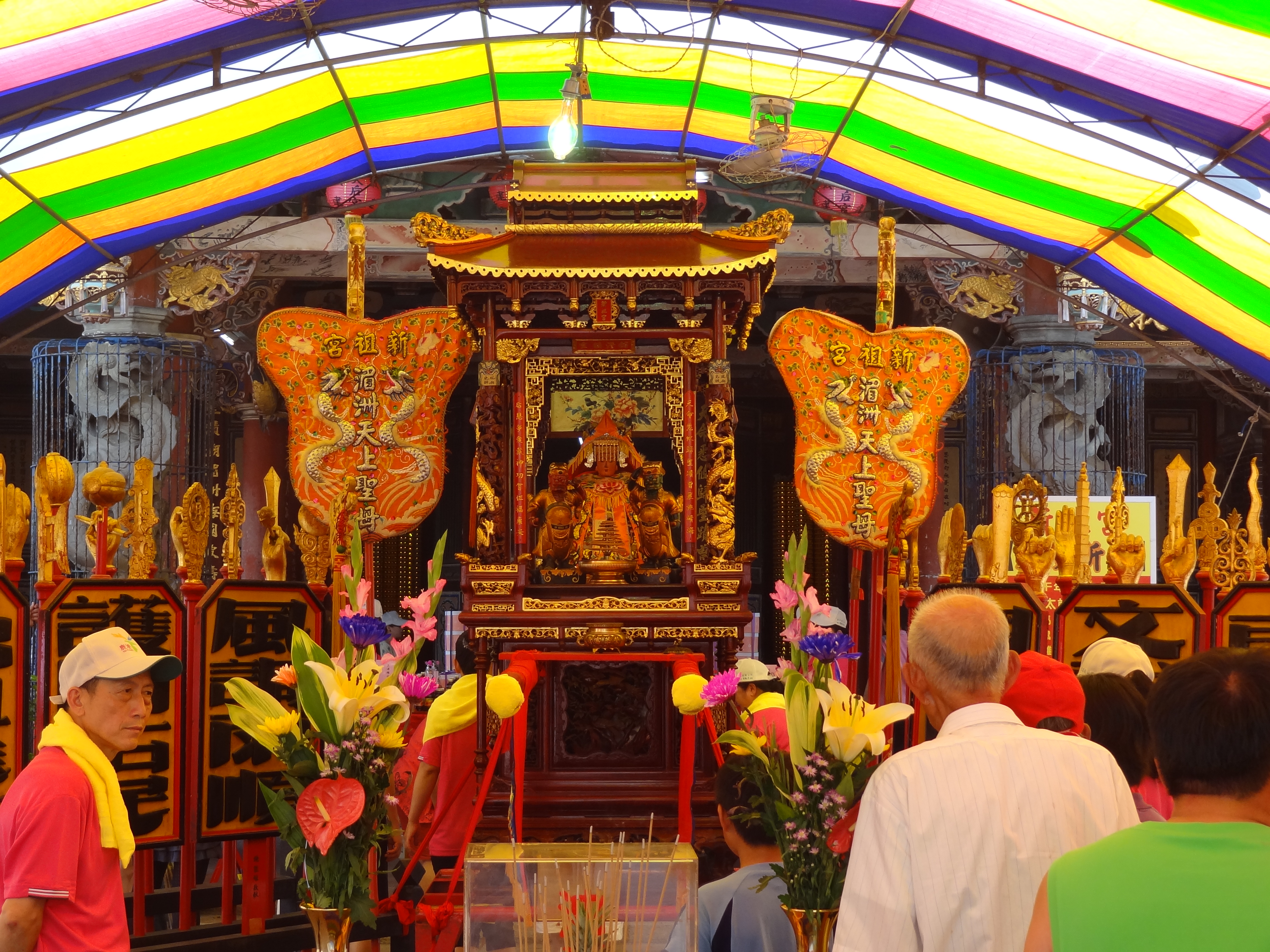
Chinese sea goddess Mazu

- Emperor the Water Official (shuǐguān)
- Ehuang & Nuying, goddesses of the Xiang River.
- Gonggong, red-haired dragon with the head of a man and water god who, together with his associate Xiang Yao, is responsible for the great floods.
- Hebo, god of the Yellow River.
- Longmu, goddess of the Xijiang River in the Lingnan area.
- Mazu, goddess of the sea and protector of seafarers.
- Shuimu, goddess of the water.
- Shui Wei Niang, goddess of the water.
- Shuidexianjun (水德星君)
- Tam Kung, sea deity worshiped in Hong Kong and Macau with the ability to forecast weather.
- Honorable Kings of the Water Immortals (Shuixian Zunwang).
  - Han Ao or Lu Ban, the inventors.
  - Qu Yuan, Wu Zixu, and Xiang Yu, famous suicides lost in rivers.
  - Yu the Great, tamer of China's Great Flood.
- Dragon Kings of the Four Seas.
  - Ao Kuang, Dragon King of the Eastern Sea.
  - Ao Qin, Dragon King of the Southern Sea.
  - Ao Run, Dragon King of the Western Sea.
  - Ao Shun, Dragon King of the Northern Sea.

==== Japanese ====
- Ebisu, god of fortunes and fishery, often being referred to marine megafaunas such as whales and whale sharks (hence being also called "Ebisu-shark").
- Funadama, sea god said to protect boats and sailors.
- Hanzaki Daimyojin, gigantic Japanese giant salamander and master of the water.
- Kuraokami, one of Suijin.
- Mizuchi, Japanese dragon and sea god.
- Ōyamatsumi, god of mountains, sea and war.
- Ryūjin or Watatsumi, Japanese dragon and tutelary deity of the sea.
- Suijin, Shinto god of water.
- Sumiyoshi sanjin, god of ocean and sailing.
- Susanoo, Shinto god of storms and the sea.
- Watatsumi, dragon king and ocean god.
- Yamata no Orochi, serpentine monster but also regarded as an incarnation of violent river.

Ainu

- Amemasu, monster in the lakes.
- Rep-un-kamuy, god of the sea, often referring to orca.

==== Korean ====
- Imoogi or Imugi, giant serpents of Korean folklore which later become true dragons.
- King Munmu, a king who wished to become a dragon before his death to protect Korea from the Donghae.
- Yongwang, an undersea deity believed to determine the fortunes of fishermen and sailors.

=== South Asia ===
==== Hindu ====
In Hindu culture, each water body is worshipped as a form of God. Hence, the rivers are worshipped as goddesses and the ocean is worshipped as a god.

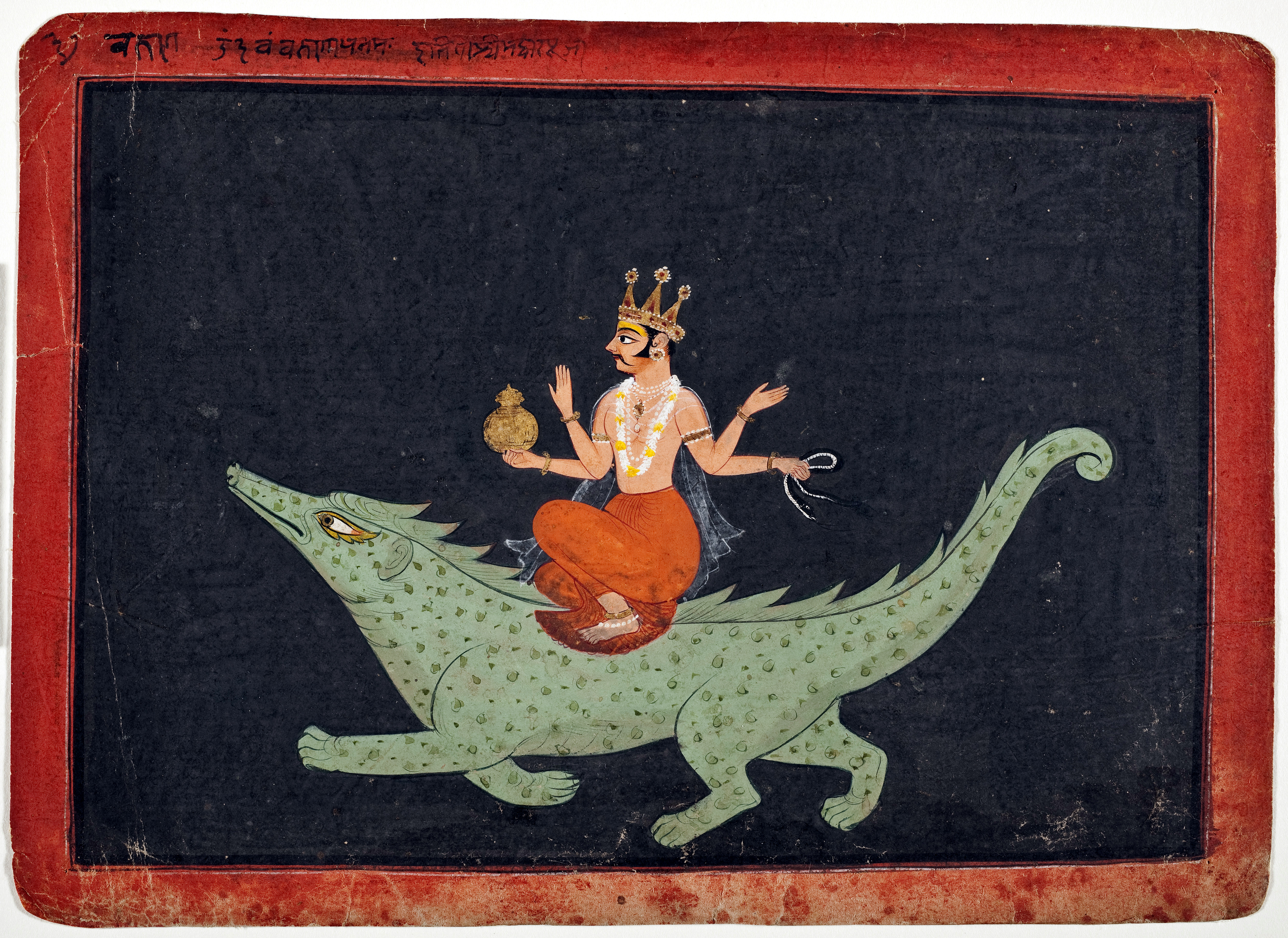
Varuna, the Lord of All the Water Bodies

- Ap, group of water goddesses.
- Matsya, avatar of Vishnu in piscine form
- Apam Napat, god of fresh water, such as in rivers and lakes.
- Danu, goddess of primordial waters, mother of Vritra and the Danavas.
- Makara, mystical creature of waters.
- Varuna, the God of the ocean and rains and water.
- Indra, King of the Gods, God of weather, and bringer of rain, thunderstorms and clouds.
- Saptasindhu, the seven holy rivers of India, namely:
  - Ganga, the Goddess of the Ganges River.
  - Yamuna, the Goddess of the Yamuna River.
  - Saraswati, the divine Goddess of knowledge and wisdom who was personified as a river that dried up in ancient times.
  - Indus, also called Sindhu. The river is considered the eldest daughter of the Himalaya mountains.
  - Narmada, the river Goddess often worshipped as a deity and daughter of Lord Shiva.
  - Godavari, the longest river of South India. The river is also considered as Dakshina Ganga aka South(ern) Ganga.
  - Kaveri, a river of South India, worshipped by people as a goddess who was previously incarnated as Lopamudra, the wife of Sage Agastya.
- Rivers such as Tapi, also known as Tapati, is worshipped as a daughter of the sun god, Surya.
- The river Krishna, worshipped as Krishnaveni Devi/Krishna Mai, is considered to be Lord Vishnu born as a river.
- Tungabhadra, a tributary of Krishna, is worshipped as a goddess. The river is also known as Pampa.
- Pamba River and Suvarnamukhi River flowing past the holy temple towns of Sabarimala in Kerala and Tirupati and Srikalahasti in Andhra Pradesh, respectively.
- The river Brahmaputra is the only river to have a male personification, whose name means "son of Brahma", the creator.
- Mariamman, regional goddess of the rain and medicine

==== Meitei ====
- Wangbren, the Sea God who holds storm, rain and disaster .
- Poubi Lai, the giant dragon who ruled its tyranny in the Loktak lake.
- Irai Leima, the Goddess of water and aquatic life.
- Ngāreima, goddess of fish
- Thongjarok Lairembi of Thongjaorok River
- Iril Lairembi of Iril River
- Imphal Turel Lairembi of Imphal River
- Kongba Turel Lairembi of Kongba River
- Loktak Ima of Loktak Lake
- Pumlenpat Lairembi of Pumlenpat Lake

=== Southeast Asia ===
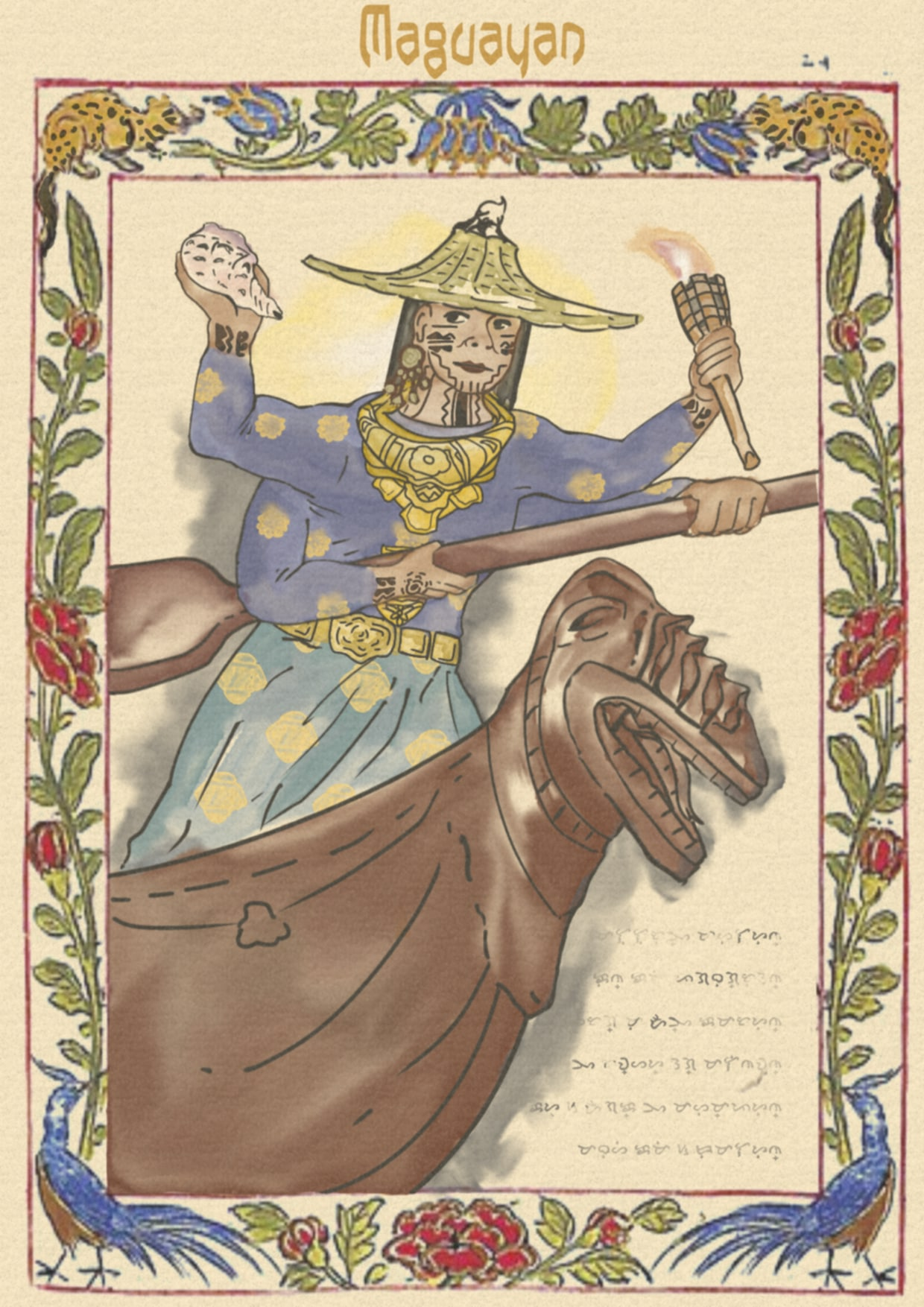
Magwayen

==== Filipino ====
- Sirinan: the Isnag spirit of the river
- Limat: the Gaddang god of the sea
- Oden: the Bugkalot deity of the rain, worshiped for its life-giving waters
- Ocean Deity: the Ilocano goddess of the ocean whose waters slammed the ediface of salt being built by Ang-ngalo and Asin, causing the sea's water to become salty
- Gods of the Pistay Dayat: Pangasinense gods who are pacified through the Pistay Dayat ritual, where offerings are given to the spirits of the waters who pacify the gods
- Anitun Tauo: the Sambal goddess of win and rain who was reduced in rank by Malayari for her conceit
- Sedsed: the Aeta god of the sea
- Apûng Malyari: the Kapampangan moon god who lives in Mt. Pinatubo and ruler of the eight rivers
- Lakandanum: variant of the Kapampangan Naga, known to rule the waters
- Bathala: the Tagalog supreme god and creator deity, also known as Bathala Maykapal, Lumilikha, and Abba; an enormous being with control over thunder, lightning, flood, fire, thunder, and earthquakes; presides over lesser deities and uses spirits to intercede between divinities and mortals
- Anitun Tabu: the Tagalog goddess of wind and rain and daughter of Idianale and Dumangan
- Lakapati: the Tagalog hermaphrodite deity and protector of sown fields, sufficient field waters, and abundant fish catch
- Amanikable: the Tagalog god of the sea who was spurned by the first mortal woman; also a god of hunters
- Amansinaya: the Tagalog goddess of fishermen
- Haik: the Tagalog god of the sea who protects travelers from tempests and storms
- Bulan-hari: one of the Tagalog deities sent by Bathala to aid the people of Pinak; can command rain to fall; married to Bitu-in
- Makapulaw: the Tagalog god of sailors
- Great Serpent of Pasig: a giant Tagalog serpent who created the Pasig river after merchants wished to the deity; in exchange for the Pasig's creation, the souls of the merchants would be owned by the serpent
- Quadruple Deities: the four childless naked Tau-buid Mangyan deities, composed of two gods who come from the sun and two goddesses who come from the upper part of the river; summoned using the paragayan or diolang plates
- Afo Sapa: the Buhid Mangyan owner of rivers
- Apu Dandum: the Hanunoo Mangyan spirit living in the water
- Tubigan: the Bicolano god of the water
- Dagat: the Bicolano goddess of the sea
- Bulan: the Bicolano moon god whose arm became the earth, and whose tears became the rivers and seas
- Magindang: the Bicolano god of fishing who leads fishermen in getting a good fish catch through sounds and signs
- Onos: the Bicolano deity who freed the great flood that changed the land's features
- Hamorawan Lady: the Waray deity of the Hamorawan spring in Borongan, who blesses the waters with healing properties
- Maka-andog: an epic Waray giant-hero who was friends with the sea spirits and controlled wildlife and fish; first inhabitant and ruler of Samar who lived for five centuries; later immortalized as a deity of fishing
- Magwayen: the Visayan goddess who rules over the oceans as her kingdom; mother of Lidagat; wife of Kaptan
- Magauayan: the Bisaya sea deity who fought against Kaptan for eons until Manaul intervened
- Lidagat: the Bisaya sea deity married to the wind; daughter of Maguayan
- Bakunawa: the Bisaya serpent deity who can coil around the world; sought to swallow the seven "Queen" moons, successfully eating the six, where the last is guarded by bamboos
- Makilum-sa-tubig: the Bisaya god of the sea
- Kasaray-sarayan-sa-silgan: the Bisaya god of streams
- Magdan-durunoon: the Bisaya god of hidden lakes
- Santonilyo: a Bisaya deity who brings rain when its image is immersed at sea
- Magyawan: the Hiligaynon god of the sea
- Manunubo: the Hiligaynon and Aklanon good spirit of the sea
- Launsina: the Capiznon goddess of the sun, moon, stars, and seas, and the most beloved because people seek forgiveness from her
- Kapapu-an: the Karay-a pantheon of ancestral spirits from whom the supernatural powers of shamans originated from; their aid enables specific types of shamans to gush water from rocks, leap far distances, create oil shields, become invisible, or pass through solid matter
- Neguno: the Cuyonon and Agutaynen god of the sea that cursed a selfish man by turning him into the first shark
- Polo: the benevolent Tagbanwa god of the sea whose help is invoked during times of illness
- Diwata Kat Sidpan: a deity who lives in the western region called Sidpan; controls the rains
- Diwata Kat Libatan: a deity who lives in the eastern region called Babatan; controls the rain
- Tagma-sa-Dagat: the Subanon god of the sea
- Tagma-sa-uba: the Subanon god of the rivers
- Diwata na Magbabaya: simply referred as Magbabaya; the good Bukidnon supreme deity and supreme planner who looks like a man; created the earth and the first eight elements, namely bronze, gold, coins, rock, clouds, rain, iron, and water; using the elements, he also created the sea, sky, moon, and stars; also known as the pure god who wills all things; one of three deities living in the realm called Banting
- Dadanhayan ha Sugay: the evil Bukidnon lord from whom permission is asked; depicted as the evil deity with a human body and ten heads that continuously drools sticky saliva, which is the source of all waters; one of the three deities living in the realm called Banting
- Bulalakaw: the Bukidnon guardian of the water and all the creatures living in it
- Python of Pusod Hu Dagat: the gigantic Bukidnon python living at the center of the sea; caused a massive flood when it coiled its body at sea
- Bulalakaw: the Talaandig deity who safeguards the creatures in the rivers; the lalayon ritual is offered to the deity
- Tagbanua: the Manobo god of rain
- Yumud: the god of water
- Pamulak Manobo: the Bagobo supreme deity and creator of the world, including the land, sea, and the first humans; throws water from the sky, causing rain, while his spit are the showers
- Eels of Mount Apo: two giant Bagobo eels, where one went east and arrived at sea, begetting all the eels of the world; the other went west, and remained on land until it died and became the western foothills of Mount Apo
- Fon Eel: the Blaan spirit of water
- Fu El: the T'boli spirit of water
- Fu El Melel: the T'boli spirit of the river
- Segoyong: the Teduray guardians of the classes of natural phenomena; punishes humans to do not show respect and steal their wards; many of them specialize in a class, which can be water, trees, grasses, caves behind waterfalls, land caves, snakes, fire, nunuk trees, deer, and pigs
- Tunung: the Maguindanao spirits who live in the sky, water, mountain, or trees; listens to prayers and can converse with humans by borrowing the voice of a medium; protects humans from sickness and crops from pests
- Tonong: divine Maranao spirits who often aid heroes; often lives in nonok trees, seas, lakes, and the sky realm
- Umboh Tuhan: also called Umboh Dilaut, the Sama-Bajau god of the sea and one of the two supreme deities; married to Dayang Dayang Mangilai
- Umboh Kamun: the Sama-Bajau totem of mantis shrimp
- Sumangâ: the Sama-Bajau spirit of sea vessels; the guardian who deflects attacks

==== Indonesian ====
- Dewi Danu, Balinese Hindu water goddess.
- Dewi Lanjar, Javanese Queen of the North Sea.
- Nyai Roro Kidul, Javanese Queen of the South Sea (Indian Ocean).

==== Cambodia ====
- Yeay Mao, a neak ta divinity in Khmer Buddhism that is the patron guardian of sailors, travelers, and hunters.

==== Vietnamese ====
- Động Đình Quân, Kinh Dương Vương's father-in-law, grandfather of Lạc Long Quân, he was a Long Vương who lived in Dongting Lake.
- Lạc Long Quân, he is the ancestor of the Vietnamese people and is also one of the top Long Vươngs under the Water Palace.
- Bát Hải Long Vương or Vua Cha Bát Hải Động Đình, he is a Long Vương and also the father of Mẫu Thoải. He is the son of Lạc Long Quân and one of the heads of the Water Palace.
- Đông Hải Long Vương, was the 25th son of Lạc Long Quân and Âu Cơ who ruled the whole Bồ Sào region, ruled the Red River, gathered people scattered because of floods to re-explore the hamlets, and kept quiet villages throughout the delta form Ngã ba Hạc to the sea estuary.
- Mẫu Thoải, the head goddess of all rivers, lakes and seas. She governs water and all things related to water.
- Long Vương, the Long Vương is a common name for the gods who rule over the sea and ocean.
- Tô Lịch Giang Thần, god of Tô Lịch River.
- Hà Bá, the god who manages the rivers (note that each river has its own governing god, and each person's power may be less or more powerful than Hà Bá).
- Bà Thủy, goddess has the same function as Hà Bá
- Cá Ông, this god often appears in the form of large fish (such as whales, dolphins, sperm whales,...) to help ships that have accidents due to weather at sea.
- Độc Cước, god of protection for the people of the sea.
- Thuồng Luồng or Giao Long, They can be water monsters, they can also be water gods.

=== Western Asia and Central Asia ===
==== Armenian ====
- Astłik, goddess of water sources.
- Tsovinar, goddess of seas and storms.

==== Canaanite ====
- Yam (god), god of the sea.
- Asherah (Goddess), goddess of water, fertility, mother goddess, queen of gods and heaven.
- Atargatis, fertility goddess tied to fish and identified with a mermaid figure.
- Marah, goddess of water, Anat's twin sister being described as benevolent.

==== Hebrew ====
- Leviathan, sea serpent.

==== Hittite ====
- Aruna, god of the sea.

==== Mesopotamian ====
- Abzu, god of fresh water, father of all other gods.
- Enbilulu, god of rivers and canals.
- Enki, god of water and of the river Tigris.
- Kulullû, the "fish man", monster servant of Marduk.
- Marduk, god associated with water, vegetation, judgment, and magic.
- Nammu, goddess of the primeval sea.
- Nanshe, goddess of the Persian Gulf, justice, prophecy, fertility and fishing.
- Tiamat, goddess of salt water and chaos, also mother of all gods.
- Sirsir, god of mariners.

==== Ossetia ====
- Donbettyr, master of all waters.

==== Iranic and Zoroastrian ====
- Ahurani, Ahurani is a water goddess from ancient Persian mythology who watches over rainfall as well as standing water.
- Anahita, the divinity of "the Waters" (Aban) and associated with fertility, healing, and wisdom.
- Apam Napat, the divinity of rain and the maintainer of order.
- Haurvatat, the Amesha Spenta associated with water, prosperity, and health in post-Gathic Zoroastrianism.
- Tishtrya, Zoroastrian benevolent divinity associated with life-bringing rainfall and fertility.

==== Turkic ====
- Talay, god of ocean.

=== Polynesian ===
==== Fijian ====
- Dakuwaqa, a shark god.
- Daucina, god of seafaring.

==== Hawaiian ====
- Kāmohoaliʻi, shark god.
- Kanaloa or Tangaroa, god of the ocean and magics and underworld with forms of cephalopod.
- Kāneikokala, shark god who rescued shipwrecked sailors.
- Nāmaka, sea goddess.
- Nanaue, another shark god.
- Ukupanipo, shark god who controls the amount of fish close enough for the fisherman to catch.

==== Māori ====
- Ikatere, a fish god, the father of all the sea creatures including mermaids.
- Kiwa, a guardian of the sea.
- Rongomai, a whale god.
- Ruahine, an eel god.
- Taniwha, deities or monsters (often take forms resembling dragons).
- Tangaroa, god of the sea.
- Tawhirimātea, god of the weather, rain, storms and wind
- Tinirau, a guardian of the sea.
- Tohora (Maori name for southern right whales), the great whale who saved legendary hero Paikea, famously known as the Whale Rider, (also the Maori name for humpback whales) from drowning and carried him to land. This led to the creation of New Zealand.

=== Samoan ===
==== other island nations ====
- Agunua, serpentine god of the sea of Solomon Islands.
- Ayida Wedo, serpentine spirit among several island nations.

Cook Islands

- Tangaroa, God of the Ocean and Seas
- Momoke, fair maidens, said to be water spirits with skin as pale as milk. These 'white ones' approach those on land during the night, emerging from deep pools of water to collect food or to seduce men before returning to the water depths. It is said that the Momoke come from an underwater nation, though some have said that this watery kingdom is also 'Avaiki'; paradise, heaven and the source of all of creation.

==== Aboriginal Australian ====
- Eingana, mother of all.
- Rainbow Serpents, creators of dreamtime.
- Ungud, serpent god bring fortunes.
- Wirnpa, creator of rain.
- Yurlungur, the copper serpent.

== Europe ==
=== Baltic ===
==== Lithuanian ====
- Bangpūtys, god of sea and storm.
- Laumė, goddess of wild spaces, including waters.

=== Celtic ===
- Belisama, goddess of lakes and rivers, fire, crafts, and light.
- Grannus, a god associated with spas, the sun, fires and healing thermal and mineral springs.
- Nantosuelta, river goddess of fire, the earth, healing, and fertility.
- Nodens, god associated with healing, the sea, hunting and dogs.
- Damona, water goddess associated with healing and rivers
- Selkie, a mythological creature associated with seals.

==== Gaulish ====
- Acionna, a water goddess/genius loci of the Orleanais region and the Essonne.
- Condatis, god of the River Wear and healing.
- Segeta, goddess of the Loire.
- Sequana, goddess of the River Seine.
- Souconna, goddess of the Saône.
- Sirona, a goddess associated with healing springs.
- Coventina, a goddess of springs, wells and fresh water from Britain and Roman Gaul.
- Nehelennia, a Belgiian Gaulish goddess of the sea, sailors and trading.

==== Irish ====
- Brigid, a goddess sometimes associated with water and where three streams join (relating to her being a Triple Goddess).
- Boann, goddess of the River Boyne.
- Danu (Dana), Continental Celtic river goddess. Her Irish variation was an ancestor/mother goddess.
- Manannán mac Lir, god of the sea.
- Lí Ban, water goddess.
- Lir, god of the sea.
- Sinann, goddess of the River Shannon.

==== Welsh ====
- Dylan Eil Ton, god of the sea
- Llŷr, god of the sea.

==== Lusitanian ====
- Bandua, theonym associated with fountains.
- Duberdicus, god of the sea and rivers.
- Durius, personification of the Douro river.

=== Germanic ===
==== Ancient ====
- Ægir, personification of the sea.
- Freyr, god of rain, sunlight, fertility, life, and summer.
- Nehalennia, goddess of the North Sea.
- Nerthus, mostly an earth goddess, but is also associated with lakes, springs, and holy waters.
- Nine Daughters of Ægir, who personify the characteristics of waves.
- Nix, water spirits who usually appear in human form.
- Njörðr, god of the sea, particularly of seafaring.
- Rán, sea goddess of death who collects the drowned in a net, wife of Ægir.
- Rhenus Pater, god of the Rhine river
- Rura, goddess of the Rur river
- Sága, wisdom goddess who lives near water and pours Odin a drink when he visits.

==== English folklore ====
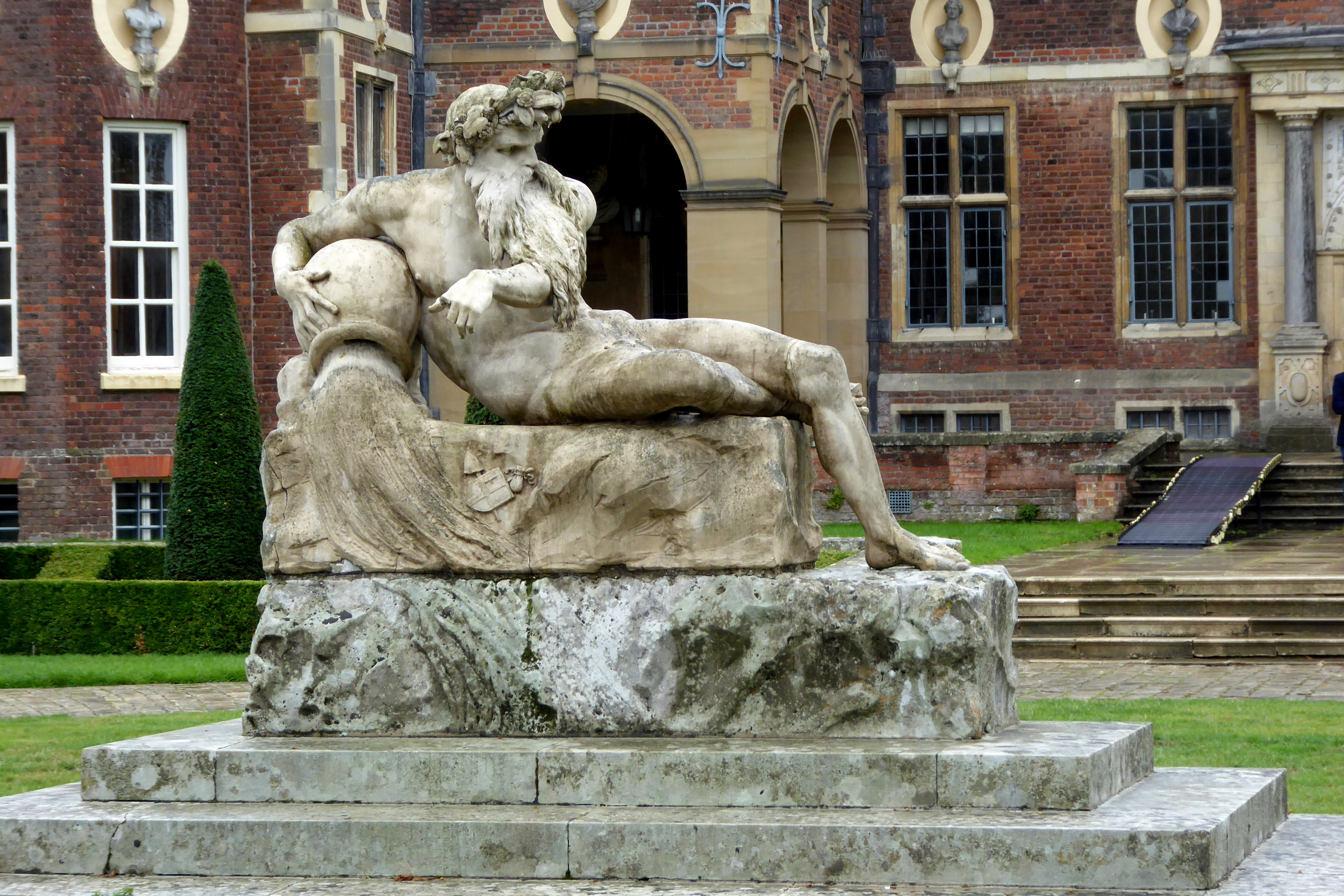
Late 18th-century statue of Father Thames by John Bacon the elder at Ham House, near Richmond, London

- Father Thames, human manifestation and/or guardian of the River Thames that flows through Southern England, while his ancient worship is obscure, he has become a popular symbol of the river in modern times, it being the subject of the song "Old Father Thames" and the model of several statues and reliefs scattered around London.
- Davy Jones, the Devil of the seas in Western piratical lore.
- Tiddy Mun, a bog deity once worshiped in Lincolnshire, England who had the ability to control floods.

==== Scandinavian folklore ====
- Sjörå, female lake spirits in Swedish folklore

=== Greek ===
- Achelous, Greek river god.
- Aegaeon, god of violent sea storms and ally of the Titans.
- Alpheus, river god in Arcadia.
- Amphitrite, sea goddess and consort of Poseidon and thus queen of the sea.
- Anapus, river god of eastern Sicily.
- Asopus, river god in Greece
- Asterion, river-god of Argos
- Brito-Martis, the goddess Brito-Martis is always depicted in arms.
- Brizo, goddess of sailors.
- Carcinus, a giant crab who allied itself with the Hydra against Heracles. When it died, Hera placed it in the sky as the constellation Cancer.
- Ceto, goddess of the dangers of the ocean and of sea monsters.
- Charybdis, a sea monster and spirit of whirlpools and the tide.
- Cymopoleia, a daughter of Poseidon and goddess of giant storm waves.
- Doris, goddess of the sea's bounty and wife of Nereus.
- Dynamene sea nymph and daughter of Nereus, associated with the power and might of ocean waves.
- Eidothea, prophetic sea nymph and daughter of Proteus.
- Electra, an Oceanid, consort of Thaumas.
- Enipeus, a river god
- Eurybia, goddess of the mastery of the seas.
- Galene (Γαλήνη), goddess of calm seas.
- Glaucus, the fisherman's sea god.
- Gorgons, three monstrous sea spirits.
  - Euryale
  - Medusa
  - Stheno
- The Graeae, three ancient sea spirits who personified the white foam of the sea; they shared one eye and one tooth between them.
- Hippocampi, the horses of the sea.
- The Ichthyocentaurs, a pair of centaurine sea-gods with the upper bodies of men, the lower fore-parts of horses, ending in the serpentine tails of fish.
- Kymopoleia, daughter of Poseidon and goddess of violent sea storms.
- Leucothea, a sea goddess who aided sailors in distress.
- Nerites, watery consort of Aphrodite and/or beloved of Poseidon.
- Nereus, the old man of the sea, and the god of the sea's rich bounty of fish.
- Nymphs
  - Naiades, freshwater nymphs.
  - Nereides, sea nymphs.
  - Oceanides, nymphs of freshwater sources.
- Oceanus, Titan god of the Earth-encircling river Okeanos, the font of all the Earth's fresh water.
- Palaemon, a young sea god who aided sailors in distress.
- Phorcys, god of the hidden dangers of the deep.
- Pontus, primeval god of the sea, father of the fish and other sea creatures.
- Poseidon, Olympian god of the sea and king of the sea gods; also god of flood, drought, earthquakes, and horses. His Roman equivalent is Neptune.
- Proteus, a shape-shifting, prophetic old sea god, and the herdsman of Poseidon's seals.
- Psamathe, goddess of sand beaches.
- River gods, deities of rivers, fathers of Naiads, brothers of the Oceanids, and as such, the sons of Oceanus and Tethys.
- Scylla, a sea monster, later authors made up a backstory of her being a Nereid transformed into a monster due to Circe's jealousy.
- The Telchines, sea spirits native to the island of Rhodes; the gods killed them when they turned to evil magic.
- Tethys, Titan goddess of the sources fresh-water, and the mother of the rivers, springs, streams, fountains and clouds.
- Thalassa, primordial goddess of the sea.
- Thaumas, god of the wonders of the sea and father of the Harpies and the rainbow goddess Iris.
- Thetis, leader of the Nereids who presided over the spawning of marine life in the sea, mother of Achilles.
- Triteia, daughter of Triton and companion of Ares.
- Triton, fish-tailed son and herald of Poseidon.
- Tritones, fish-tailed spirits in Poseidon's retinue.
- Aspidochelone, colossal sea monster from the medieval bestiary Physiologus.

=== Slavic ===
- Morana, a goddess associated with the winter, death and rebirth. Death and the afterlife itself are tightly connected to the bodies of water, while the effigy of Morana is thrown into a river at the end of winter so it can carry her away.
- Mokosh, a mother goddess associated with wetness.
- Rusalka a type of water spirit connected to floods and death.
- Vodyanoy, a water spirit often drowning people and collecting their souls.
- Bolotnik, a dangerous spirit of muddy waters and swamps.
- Topielec and utopce, spirits of people who were killed by Topielec (or who died drowning) and who now stay in the body of water where they died.
- Zmej or smok, a snake or dragon, often dangerous and living in or controlling a body of water.

=== Illyrian ===
- Bindus, Illyrian deity equated to Poseidon

=== Roman ===
- Arno, the personification of the Arno River

=== Uralic ===
Finnish

- Ahti, god of the depths and fish.
- Iku-Turso, a malevolent sea monster.
- Vedenemo, a goddess of water.
- Vellamo, the wife of Ahti, goddess of the sea, lakes, and storms.

== Americas ==
=== North America ===
==== Aztec ====
- Atlaua, god of water, archers, and fishermen.
- Chalchiuhtlicue, goddess of water, lakes, rivers, seas, streams, horizontal waters, storms, and baptism.
- Opochtli, god of fishing and birdcatchers.
- Tlāloc, god of water, fertility, and rain.
- Tlaloque, a group of rain, water, and mountain gods.

==== Inuit ====
- Aipaloovik, an evil sea god associated with death and destruction.
- Alignak, a lunar deity and god of weather, water, tides, eclipses, and earthquakes.
- Arnapkapfaaluk, a fearsome sea goddess.
- Idliragijenget, god of the ocean.
- Kanajuk, the scorpionfish god and husband of the goddesses Nuliajuk and Isarraitaitsoq.
- Nootaikok, god who presided over icebergs and glaciers.
- Nuliajuk and Isarraitaitsoq, goddesses of the sea's depths and its creatures among the Netsilik Inuit.
- Sedna, goddess of the sea and its creatures.

==== Other ====
- Qʼumakwa, Nuxalk god of the sea.
- Kumugwe, Kwakwakaʼwakw god of the sea.

=== Central America and the Caribbean ===
Lencan

- Ilangipuca, goddess of fertility, earth, and all bodies of water

==== Mayan ====
- Kukulcan, god of the seas.

==== Pech ====
- Kaeki Kaska, goddess of the lakes, rivers, and the fish

==== Taíno ====
- Atabey (goddess), Mother goddess of fresh water and fertility. Female counterpart of the god Yúcahu.

=== South America ===
==== Tupi-Guarani (Brazilian Myth) ====
- Boto, A deity that is capable of impregnating unmarried women.
- Amanasy, Goddess of the rain and frogs.
- Iara, Guardian of the water and of the Amazon River.
- Ipupiara, Guardian of the sea.
- Luruaçu, Goddess of the storms.
- Tupã, God of the thunder, weather, storms and clouds.

==== Incan ====
- Amaru, a colossal winged dragon-like celestial deity that can manipulate all the elements of nature.
- Mama Qucha, goddess of water, lakes, rivers, seas, streams, ponds, rain, thunderstorms, and all sources of water.
- Pariacaca, god of water, winds, and rainstorms.
- Paricia, god who sent a flood to kill humans who did not respect him adequately.
- Tunupa, god of fire, volcanoes, the sky and water.

==== Panche/Muisca ====
- Mohan, a mischievous entity associated with rivers, lakes and water in general.

== See also ==
- Ekendriya
- Holy wells
- Nature worship
- Sea monster
- Water spirit
