= Zenjibu-ji =

- 禅師峰寺
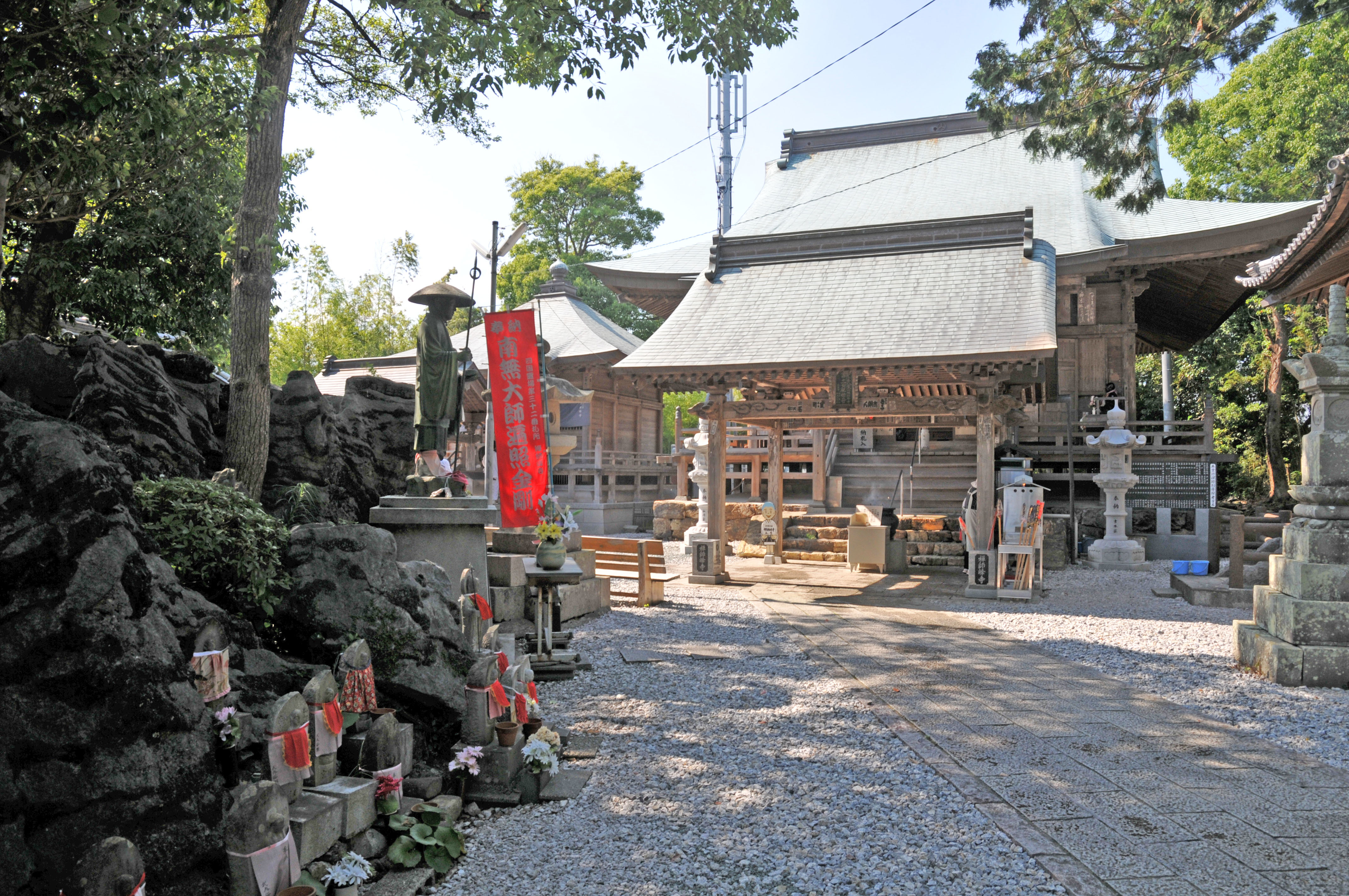

Religion
- Affiliation: Shingon

Location
- Location: Kōchi-ken
- Country: Japan
- Interactive map of Zenjibu-ji
- Coordinates: 33.526694°N 133.611389°E

Website
- http://www.88shikokuhenro.jp/32zenjibuji/

Zenjibu-ji is a Shingon Buddhist Temple located in Nankoku, Kōchi, Japan. It is the 32nd temple of the Shikoku 88 Temple Pilgrimage.

== History ==
According to the temple records, the temple hall was created under imperial decree from Emperor Shōmu in order to pray for the safety of Gyōki during a sea voyage. Later, Kūkai sensed that the hall was a sacred place, and carved Kannon as the honzon of the temple while performing a goma. Because the mountain the temple was located on was shaped like the eight-leafed lotus and Mount Potalaka, Kūkai prayed to Akasagarbha, and named the temple Gumonji-in Zenjibu-ji (求聞持院禅師峰寺).

The Honzon is called Funadama Kannon (船魂（ふなだま）の観音 lit. ship spirit Kannon) as it was an area that fishermen would gather in prayer, and used a temple to pray for safe voyage since the rule of Yamauchi Kazutoyo, often prior to departure towards Edo for the sankin-kotai.

== Shikoku 88 temple pilgrimage circuit ==
Zenjibu-ji is the 32nd temple on the 88 temple Shikoku pilgrimage. It is located 5.6 kilometers from Chikurinji, the 31st temple, and 7.8 kilometers from Sekkeiji, the 33rd temple.
