= Essonne (river) =

River in France

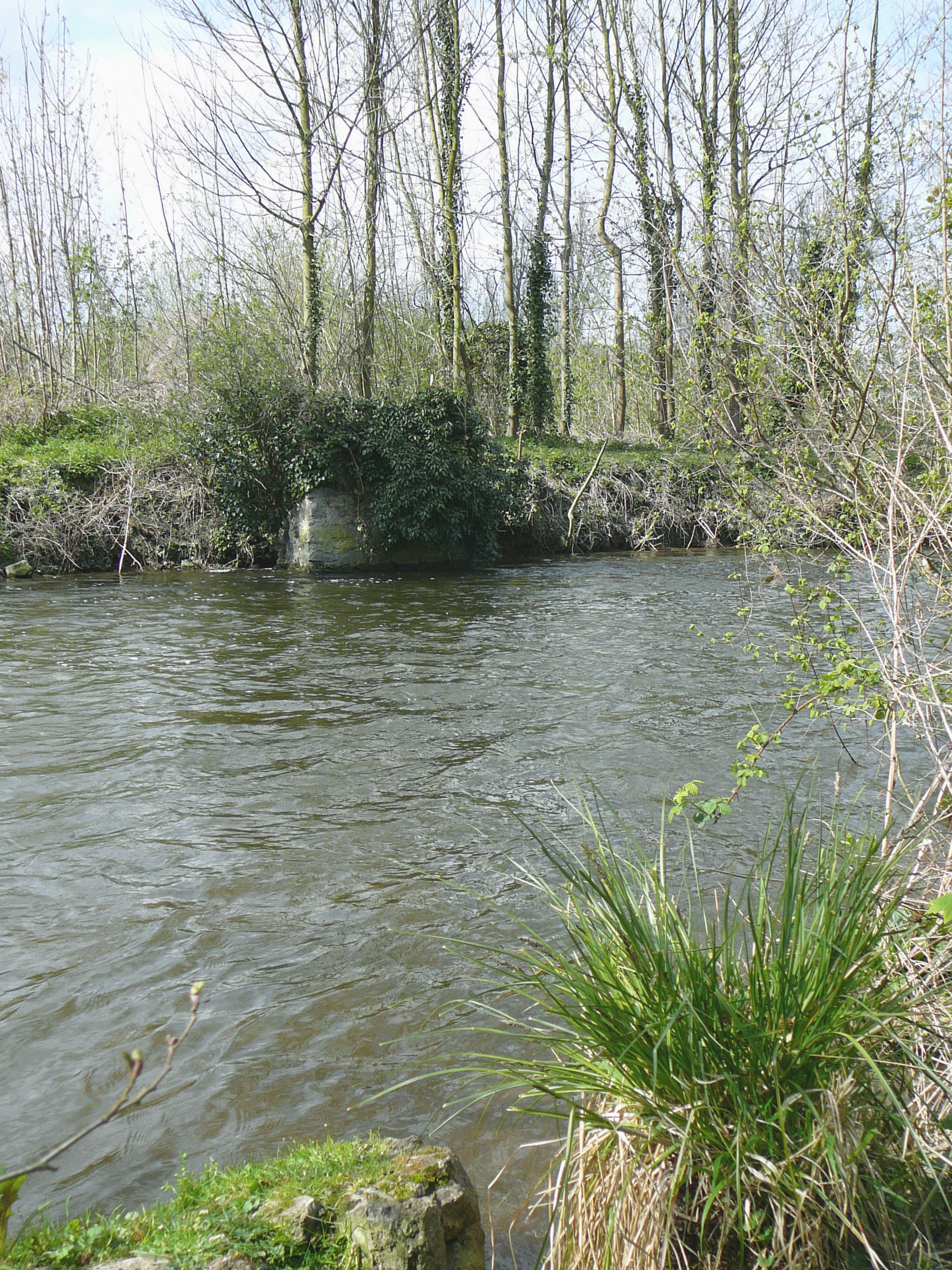

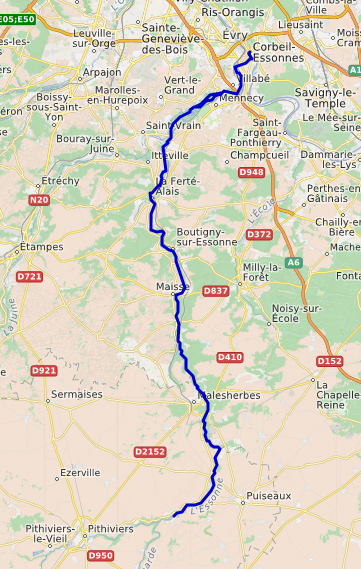
- Etymology: Latin Exona or Axonia, from the Celtic water goddess Acionna

Location
- Country: France

Physical characteristics
- Source
  - location: Gâtinais
- Mouth
  - location: Seine
  - coordinates: 48°36′52″N 2°28′52″E
- Length: 101 km (63 mi)

Basin features
- Progression: Seine→ English Channel

The Essonne (French pronunciation: [ɛsɔn]) is a 101-kilometre (63 mi) long French river. It is a left tributary of the Seine. Its course crosses the departments of Loiret and Essonne, and it gives its name to the latter. The Essone's name and the present name of its higher course (the Œuf) originate in Acionna, a Gallo-Roman river goddess attested at Orléans (Genabum).

== Geography ==
It begins on the Gâtinais plateau at La Neuville-sur-Essonne through the confluence of two rivers, the Œuf—whose source is near Chilleurs-aux-Bois, Loiret, at 130 metres (430 ft) above sea level—and the Rimarde—whose source is near Nibelle, Loiret, 182 metres (597 ft). Notably it runs through Malesherbes and La Ferté-Alais, before running into the Seine at Corbeil-Essonnes.

Notable among the Essonne's tributaries is the Juine, 53 kilometres (33 mi) long, which enters from the left. The other tributaries are short streams (the Velvette, the Ru de D’Huison, the Ru de Misery off the left bank; Ru de Boigny and the Ru de Ballancourt off the right bank).

From Corbeil-Essonnes to its terminus at Malesherbes, the RER D runs along the valley of the Essonne. Part of the basin feeding the Essonne, as well as its course between Malesherbes and La Ferté-Alais, are in the parc naturel régional du Gâtinais français.

== Communes ==
The Essonne runs through the communes of:

In Loiret
La Neuville-sur-Essonne ~ Aulnay-la-Rivière ~ Ondreville-sur-Essonne ~ Briarres-sur-Essonne ~ Dimancheville ~ Orville ~ Augerville-la-Rivière

In Seine-et-Marne
Boulancourt ~ Buthiers

In Loiret
Malesherbes

In Seine-et-Marne
Nanteau-sur-Essonne

In Essonne
Boigneville ~ Prunay-sur-Essonne ~ Buno-Bonnevaux ~ Gironville-sur-Essonne ~ Maisse ~ Courdimanche-sur-Essonne ~ Boutigny-sur-Essonne ~ Vayres-sur-Essonne ~ Guigneville-sur-Essonne ~ La Ferté-Alais ~ Baulne ~ Itteville ~ Ballancourt-sur-Essonne ~ Vert-le-Petit ~ Fontenay-le-Vicomte ~ Écharcon ~ Mennecy ~ Lisses ~ Ormoy ~ Villabé ~ Corbeil-Essonnes
