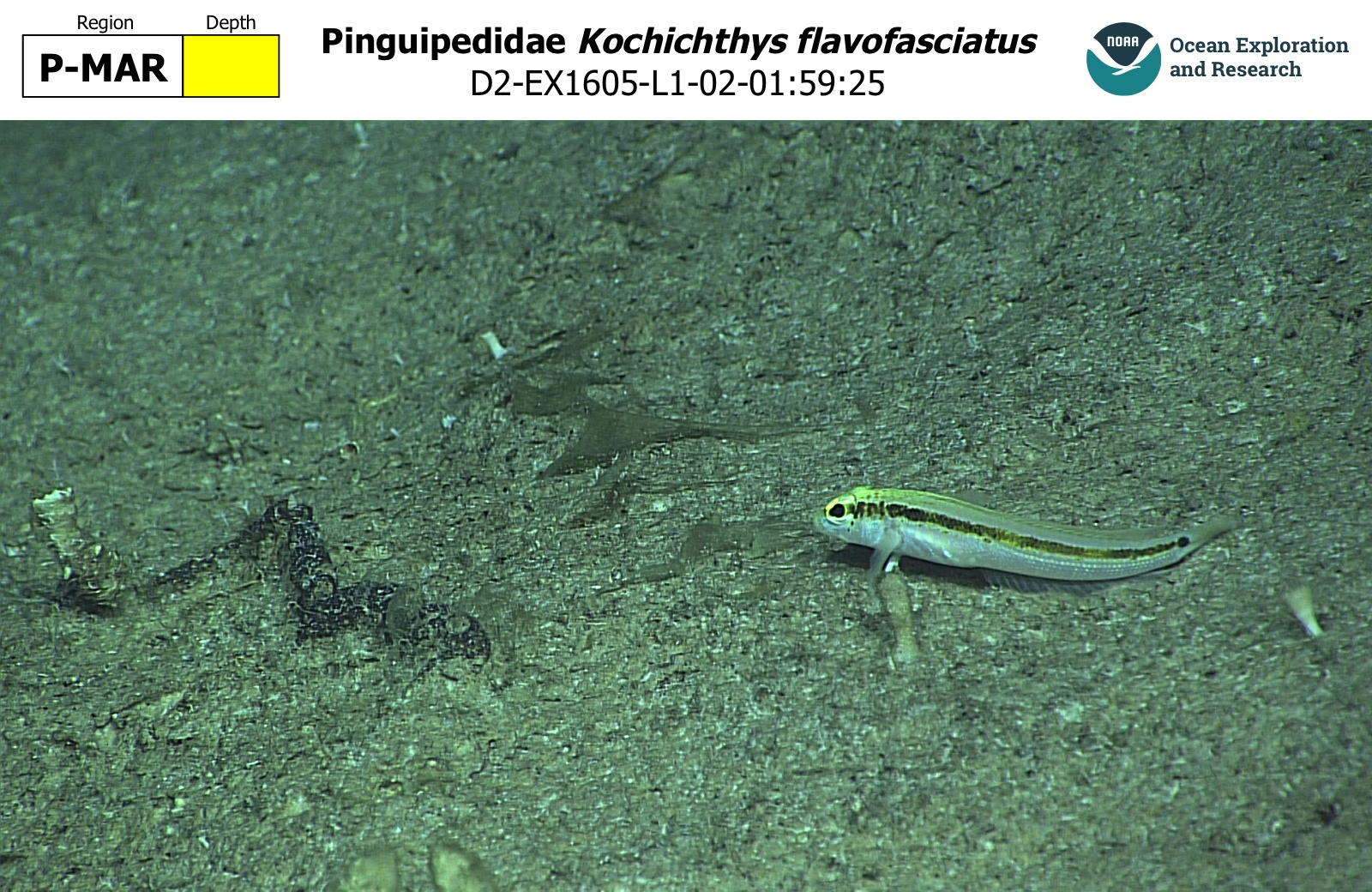

Scientific classification
- Kingdom: Animalia
- Phylum: Chordata
- Class: Actinopterygii
- Order: Labriformes
- Family: Pinguipedidae
- Genus: Kochichthys; Kamohara, 1961
- Species: K. flavofasciatus

Binomial name
- Kochichthys flavofasciatus (Kamohara, 1936)

Synonyms
- Neopercis flavofasciata Kamohara, 1936; Kochichthys flavofasciata (Kamohara, 1936)

= Kochichthys =

Genus of ray-finned fishes

Kochichthys is a monotypic genus of percomorph fish from the family Pinguipedidae. The only species in the genus, Kochichthys flaviofasciatus, is found in the western Pacific in the waters around Japan, having been recorded only from Tosa Bay in Kōchi Prefecture on the island of Shikoku.
