= Vellamo =

Finnish water goddess

- Mistress of Water
- Vellamo pictured as a mermaid in the coat of arms of Päijät-Häme.
- Other names: Vellimys (Kainuu); Ruotakatar (North Karelia)
- Gender: Female
- Ethnic group: Finns, Karelians

Genealogy
- Spouse: Ahti
- Offspring: Vellamo's maiden

Equivalents
- Estonian: Vete-ema
- Erzyan: Ved-ava

Vellamo (Finnish pronunciation: [ˈʋelːɑmo], also spelled Wellamo), is the goddess of water, lakes and seas in Finnish mythology. She is called Veen emäntä 'Mistress of Water'.

Vellamo's husband is the Finnish sea god Ahti. In Finnish fishing spells, Vellamo and Ahti are asked to bring their cattle (fish) into fishing nets.

== Name ==
The name "Vellamo" has been theorized to come from the Finnish word velloa, which means 'to churn', describing the movement of water and waves.

Kaarle Krohn and Uno Harva considered the name Vellamo to be a later-formed name from the term vellova vetonen 'churning water'. Kaarle Krohn also thought the name could've originally been Vetramo or Vetrimys, because runic songs include a mention of Veitikan vesi 'water of Veitikka' which Krohn saw as having originally been Vetrikka.

In 1551, Mikael Agricola did not mention the name Vellamo in his list of Finnish pagan gods, but he did mention Wedhen Eme 'Mother of Water', who brought fish into nets. In 1789, Christfried Ganander equated Weden Emä 'Mother of Water' with Mistress of Water, yet not mentioning the name Vellamo. Seeing the water goddess as a "Water Mother" lines with many other Finno-Ugric people's views, such as the Mordvin Ved-ava.

== In runic songs ==
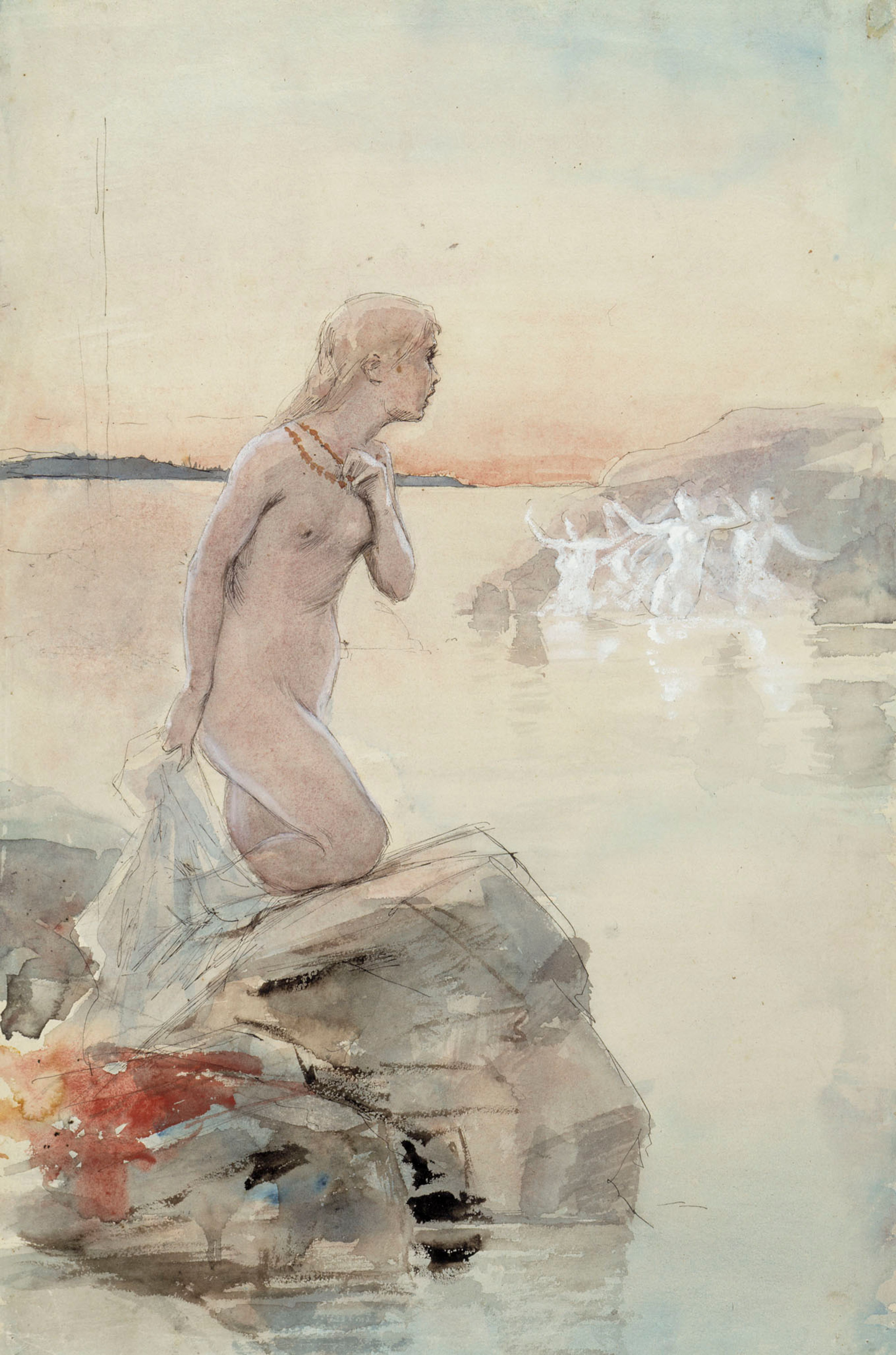
Aino and water maidens which were inspired by the "Watery maiden of Vellamo, Ahti's only child". "Aino" by Albert Edelfelt (1935).

In runic songs, the Mistress of Water is said to have risen on land, sitting on a rock with her breast on grass, to listen to Väinämöinen playing the kantele.

The Mistress of Water also had cows. She often helped poor people by sending them cattle. It was also possibly to get one of her cows if it had risen to the beach, and one could go around the cow while holding an iron object. When the Mistress's cows were on the beach eating, she herself is sitting a bit further away on a rock, combing her hair. There is also a story of fishermen catching one of her cows in a fishing net. The cows were often named Kirjo, Karjo and Haluna, but the names Lumikki, Verkuna, Torstikki, Omena and Maatinki also appear.

She was especially respected by fishermen; if you saw her, even far away, while seining, you were guaranteed to get plenty of fish. Kainuu fishing spells describe her having a shirt made of reeds and ask her and Ahti to bring their cattle, which means fish, into the fishnet.

A Karelian runic song describes a hero, such as Väinämöinen, catching a fish he tries to cut and eat. The fish jumps away, revealing herself to be a "watery maiden of Vellamo" and "Ahti's only child", mocking the hero for not noticing this. This song was one of the multiple ones Elias Lönnrot used to create the character of Aino in the Kalevala. According to some interpretations, this song describes a water maiden named Vellamo, making Vellamo Ahti's daughter.

A South Karelian runic song calls the Nixie (Näkki) the offspring of Vellamo and Ahti.

One South Savonian runic song gives the Mistress of Water the name Mieluutar, which in other runic songs refers to the Mistress of Forest, Mielikki.

== Epithets ==
Epithet	Epithet meaning	Regions
Vellamo, veen emäntä Vellimys, veen emäntä	'Vellamo, Mistress of Water'	Central Finland, Kainuu, North Karelia, North Savo, Satakunta, South Karelia, White Karelia
Meren emäntä	'Mistress of the Sea'	Central Finland, Ingria, Ladoga Karelia, North Karelia, South Ostrobothnia
Vellamo, veen kuninkas	'Vellamo, King of Water'	White Karelia and/or North Ostrobothnia
Vellamo, veen emonen Vellamo, veten emä	'Vellamo, mother of water'	North Savo, Olonets Karelia
Veen eukko, ruokorinta	'Old woman of water, breast of reed'	Kainuu, Olonets Karelia, White Karelia
Vellamo, veneen äiti	'Vellamo, mother of boat'	Kainuu
Sataharjun hallihtija	'Ruler of a hundred eskers'	Kainuu
Salon sinisilmä piika pikkarainen	'Little blue-eyed maid of deep forest'	North Savo

== In contemporary culture ==
Ambient Folk artist Archaic Earth has a track "Vellamo's Song" on the EP Hiraeth.

The Maritime Center Vellamo, which is located in the city of Kotka, Finland, is named after Vellamo.
