= Guigneville-sur-Essonne =

Commune in Île-de-France, France

- Commune
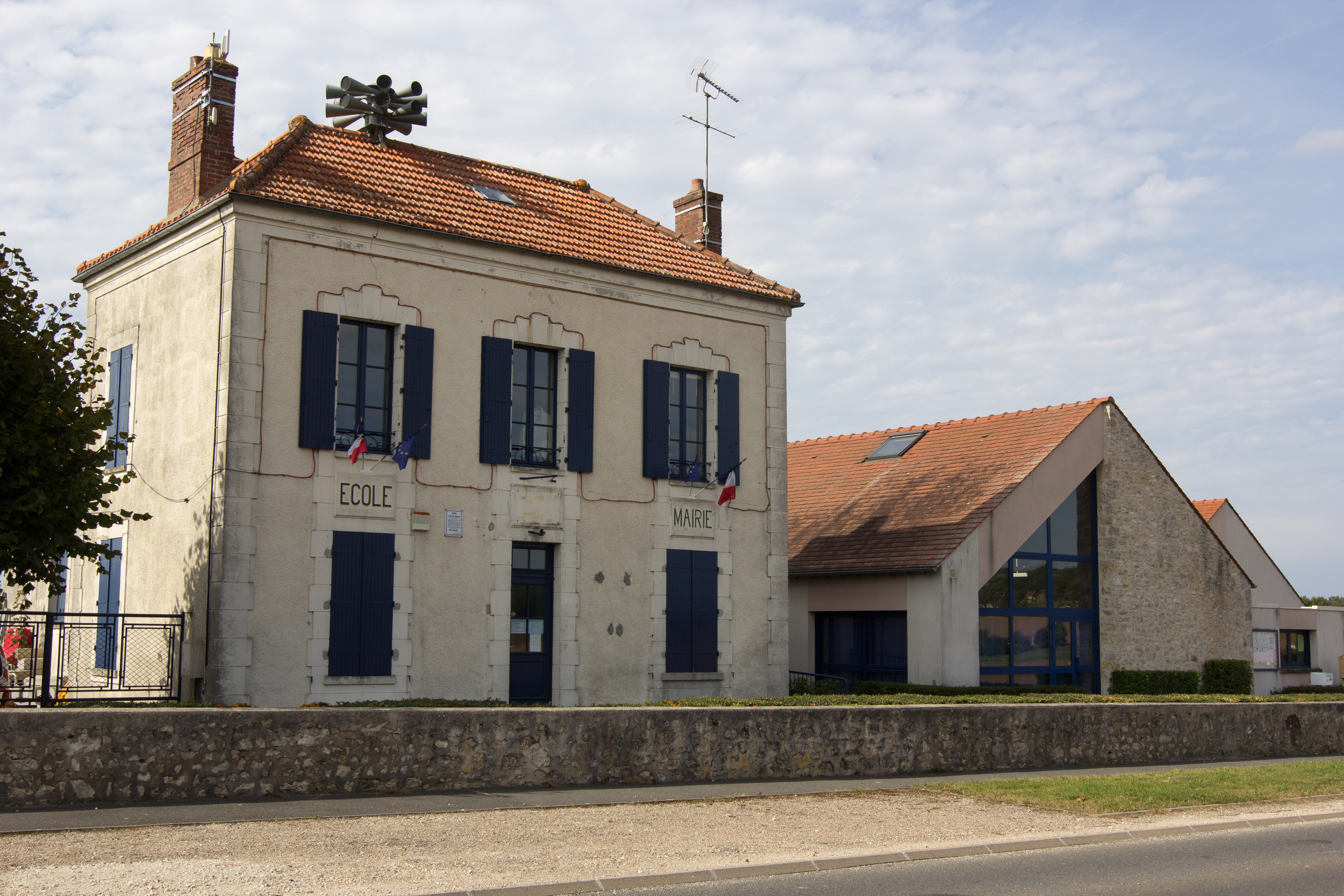
- The town hall in Guigneville-sur-Essonne

- Coat of arms
- Location of Guigneville-sur-Essonne
- Location within France Location within Île-de-France (region)
- Coordinates: 48°28′04″N 2°21′12″E
- Country: France
- Region: Île-de-France
- Department: Essonne
- Arrondissement: Étampes
- Canton: Mennecy

Government
  - Mayor (2020–2026): Gilles Le Page
- Area^{1}: 9.19 km^{2} (3.55 sq mi)
- Highest elevation: 146 m (479 ft)
- Lowest elevation: 53 m (174 ft)
- Population (2023): 904
  - Density: 98.4/km^{2} (255/sq mi)
- Time zone: UTC+01:00 (CET)
  - Summer (DST): UTC+02:00 (CEST)
- INSEE/Postal code: 91293 /91590
- ^{1} French Land Register data, which excludes lakes, ponds, glaciers > 1 km^{2} (0.386 sq mi or 247 acres) and river estuaries.

Guigneville-sur-Essonne (French pronunciation: [ɡiɲvil syʁ ɛsɔn], literally Guigneville on Essonne) is a commune in the Essonne department in Île-de-France in northern France.

Inhabitants of Guigneville-sur-Essonne are known as Guignevillois.

== See also ==
- Communes of the Essonne department
