= La Neuville-sur-Essonne =

- Commune
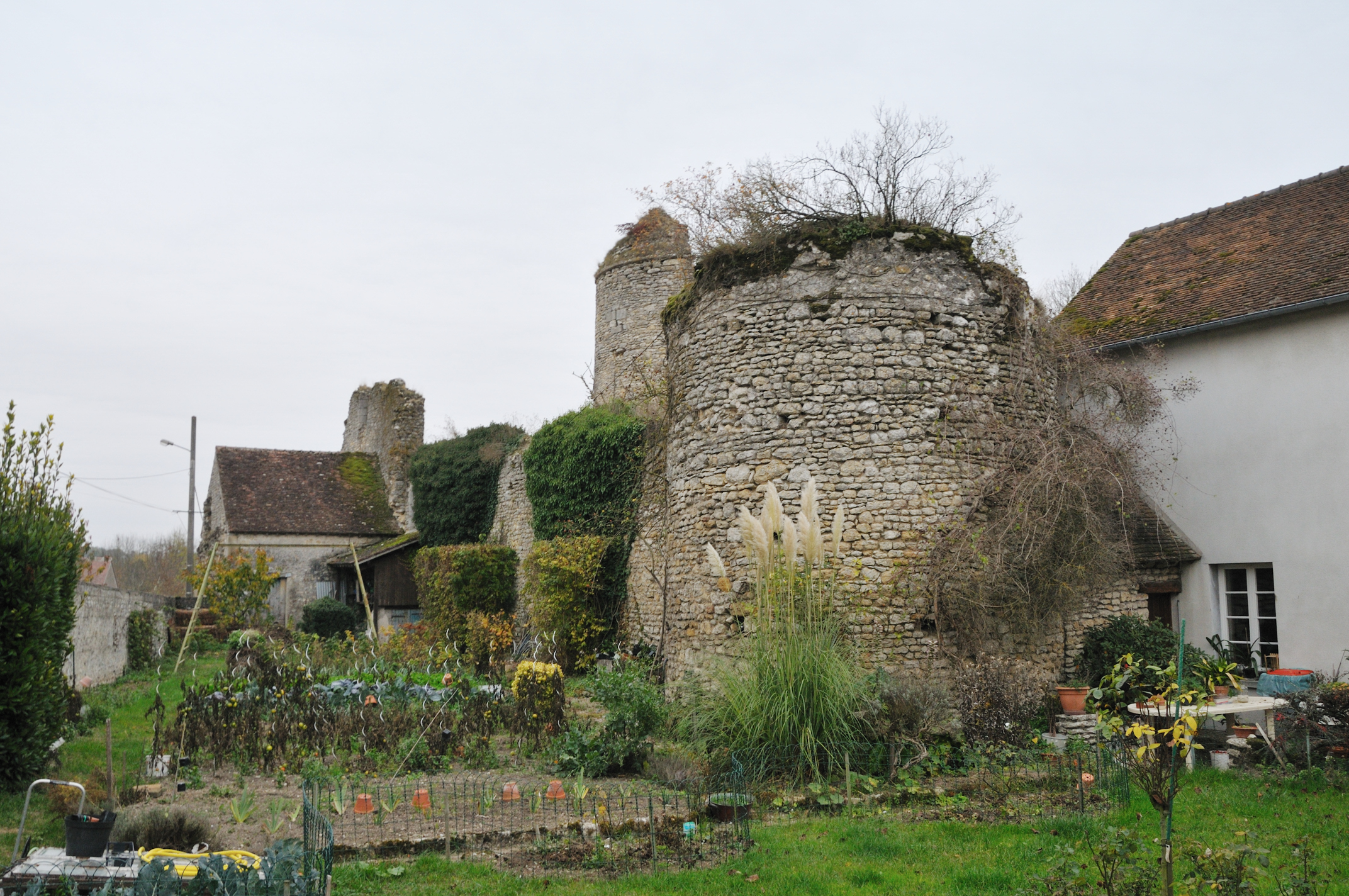
- The chateau in La Neuville-sur-Essonne

- Coat of arms
- Location of La Neuville-sur-Essonne
- Location within France Location within Centre-Val de Loire
- Coordinates: 48°11′12″N 2°22′35″E
- Country: France
- Region: Centre-Val de Loire
- Department: Loiret
- Arrondissement: Pithiviers
- Canton: Le Malesherbois
- Intercommunality: Pithiverais-Gâtinais

Government
  - Mayor (2020–2026): William Riviere
- Area^{1}: 9.19 km^{2} (3.55 sq mi)
- Highest elevation: 129 m (423 ft)
- Lowest elevation: 87 m (285 ft)
- Population (2023): 359
  - Density: 39.1/km^{2} (101/sq mi)
- Time zone: UTC+01:00 (CET)
  - Summer (DST): UTC+02:00 (CEST)
- INSEE/Postal code: 45225 /45390
- ^{1} French Land Register data, which excludes lakes, ponds, glaciers > 1 km^{2} (0.386 sq mi or 247 acres) and river estuaries.

La Neuville-sur-Essonne (French pronunciation: [la nøvil syʁ ɛsɔn], literally La Neuville on Essonne) is a commune in the Loiret department in north-central France.

This commune is the death place of Romanian conductor Sergiu Celibidache.

== Notable residents ==
- Sergiu Celibidache

== See also ==
- Communes of the Loiret department
