= Vayres-sur-Essonne =

Commune in Île-de-France, France

- Commune
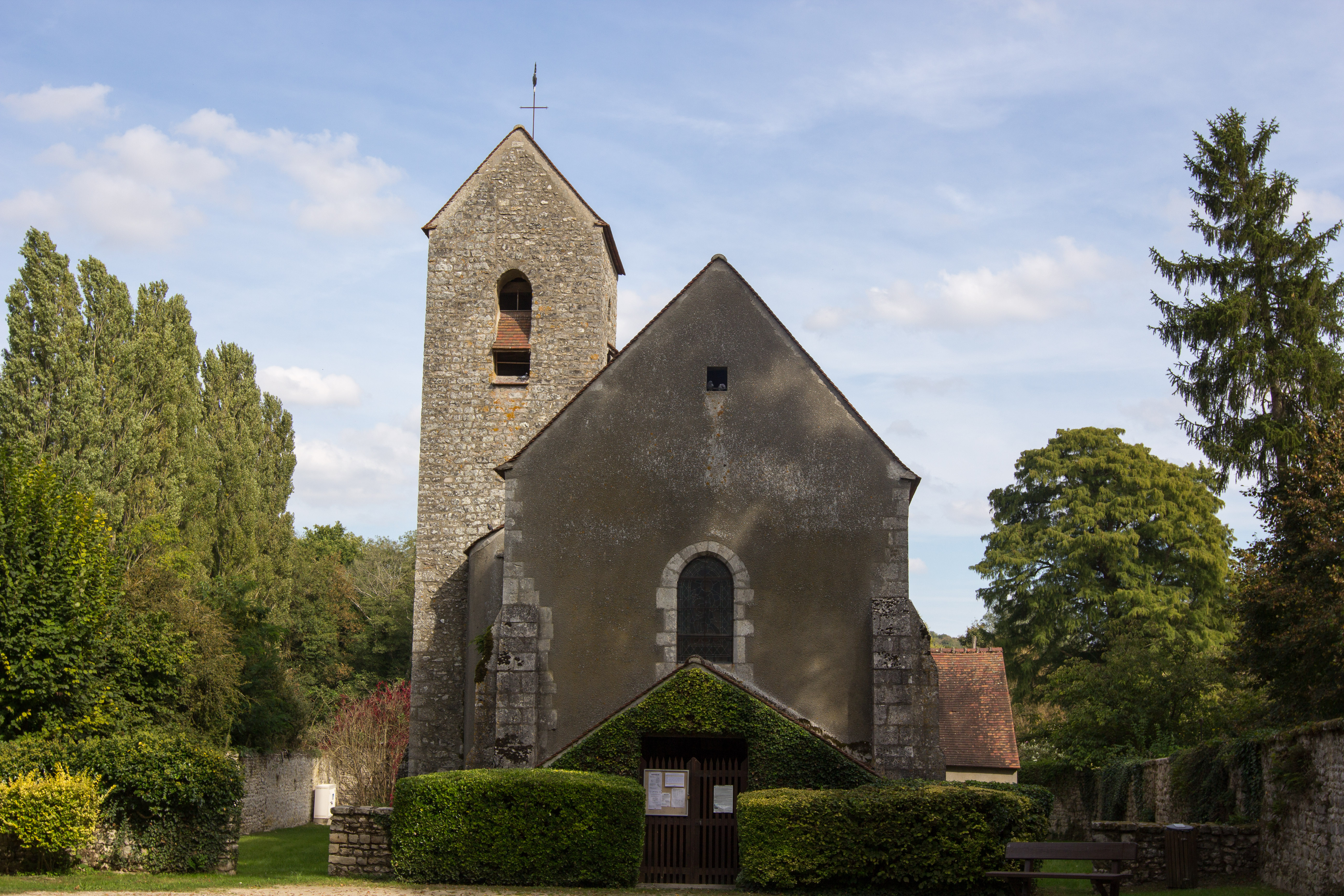
- The church in Vayres-sur-Essonne

- Coat of arms
- Location of Vayres-sur-Essonne
- Location within France Location within Île-de-France (region)
- Coordinates: 48°26′16″N 2°21′12″E
- Country: France
- Region: Île-de-France
- Department: Essonne
- Arrondissement: Étampes
- Canton: Étampes
- Intercommunality: Le Val d’Essonne

Government
  - Mayor (2020–2026): Jocelyne Boiton
- Area^{1}: 8.46 km^{2} (3.27 sq mi)
- Highest elevation: 145 m (476 ft)
- Lowest elevation: 57 m (187 ft)
- Population (2023): 978
  - Density: 116/km^{2} (299/sq mi)
- Time zone: UTC+01:00 (CET)
  - Summer (DST): UTC+02:00 (CEST)
- INSEE/Postal code: 91639 /91820
- ^{1} French Land Register data, which excludes lakes, ponds, glaciers > 1 km^{2} (0.386 sq mi or 247 acres) and river estuaries.

Vayres-sur-Essonne (French pronunciation: [vɛʁ syʁ ɛsɔn], literally Vayres on Essonne) is a commune in the Essonne department in Île-de-France in northern France. Prior to 1 January 1968, Vayres-sur-Essonne was part of the Yvelines department.

Inhabitants of Vayres-sur-Essonne are known as Vayrois.

== See also ==
- Communes of the Essonne department
