= Canton of Corbeil-Essonnes =

Coordinates: 48.61°N 2.48°E

The canton of Corbeil-Essonnes is an administrative division of the Essonne department, Île-de-France region, northern France. It was created at the French canton reorganisation which came into effect in March 2015. Its seat is in Corbeil-Essonnes.

It consists of the following communes:

1. Corbeil-Essonnes
2. Écharcon
3. Lisses
4. Villabé
