= Ondreville-sur-Essonne =

- Commune
- Coat of arms
- Location of Ondreville-sur-Essonne
- Location within France Location within Centre-Val de Loire
- Coordinates: 48°11′59″N 2°24′32″E
- Country: France
- Region: Centre-Val de Loire
- Department: Loiret
- Arrondissement: Pithiviers
- Canton: Le Malesherbois
- Intercommunality: Pithiverais-Gâtinais

Government
  - Mayor (2020–2026): Jean-Claude Mangeant
- Area^{1}: 6.57 km^{2} (2.54 sq mi)
- Highest elevation: 127 m (417 ft)
- Lowest elevation: 82 m (269 ft)
- Population (2023): 400
  - Density: 61/km^{2} (160/sq mi)
- Demonym: Grenouillard
- Time zone: UTC+01:00 (CET)
  - Summer (DST): UTC+02:00 (CEST)
- INSEE/Postal code: 45233 /45390
- Website: ondreville.online
- ^{1} French Land Register data, which excludes lakes, ponds, glaciers > 1 km^{2} (0.386 sq mi or 247 acres) and river estuaries.

Ondreville-sur-Essonne (French pronunciation: [ɔ̃dʁəvil syʁ ɛsɔn], literally Ondreville on Essonne) is a commune in the Loiret department in north-central France.

== See also ==
- Communes of the Loiret department
