= Briarres-sur-Essonne =

- Commune
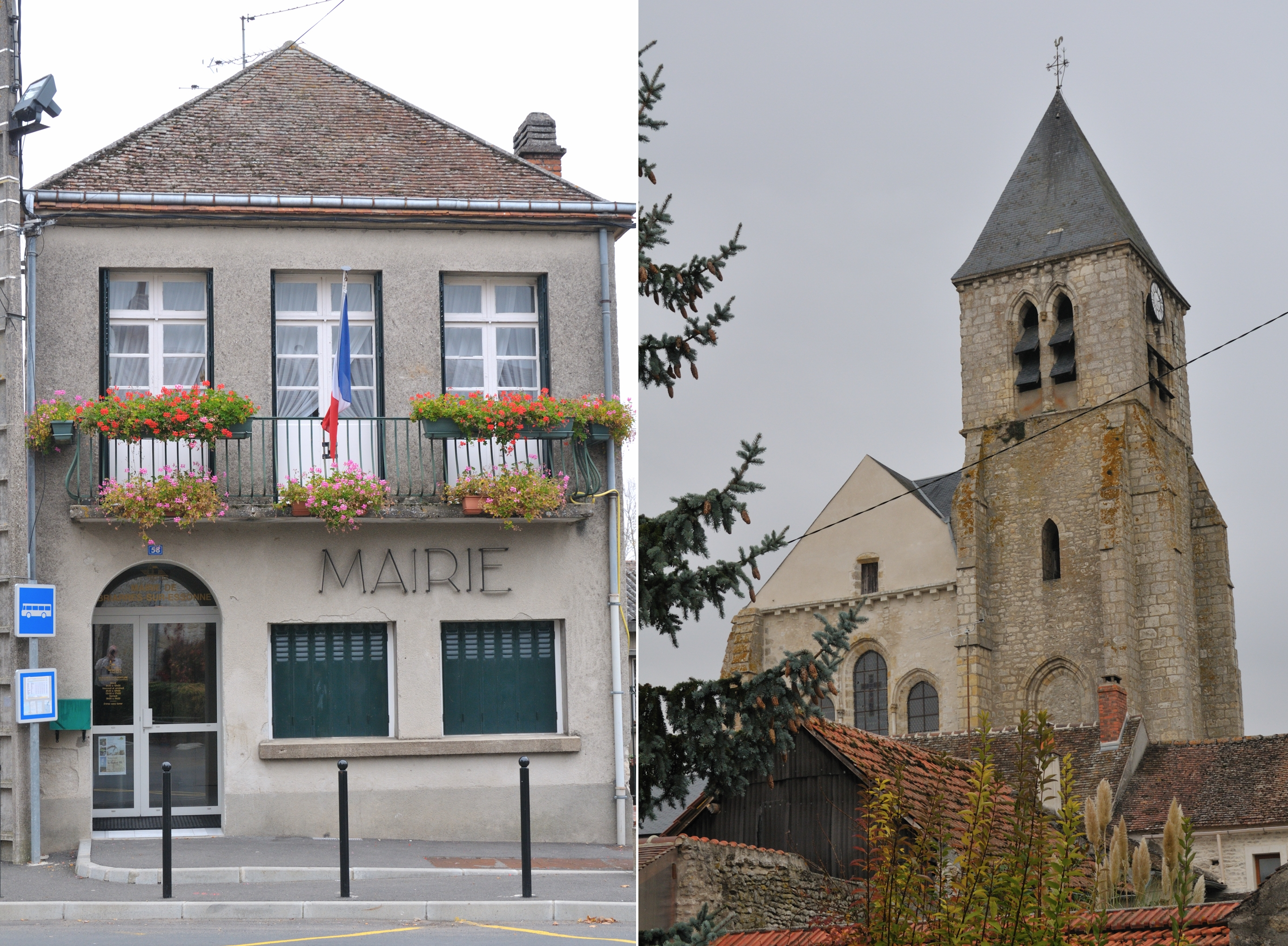
- The town hall and church in Briarres-sur-Essonne

- Coat of arms
- Location of Briarres-sur-Essonne
- Location within France Location within Centre-Val de Loire
- Coordinates: 48°13′41″N 2°25′41″E
- Country: France
- Region: Centre-Val de Loire
- Department: Loiret
- Arrondissement: Pithiviers
- Canton: Le Malesherbois
- Intercommunality: Pithiverais-Gâtinais

Government
  - Mayor (2020–2026): Christophe Bonniez
- Area^{1}: 8.23 km^{2} (3.18 sq mi)
- Highest elevation: 135 m (443 ft)
- Lowest elevation: 77 m (253 ft)
- Population (2023): 527
  - Density: 64.0/km^{2} (166/sq mi)
- Time zone: UTC+01:00 (CET)
  - Summer (DST): UTC+02:00 (CEST)
- INSEE/Postal code: 45054 /45390
- ^{1} French Land Register data, which excludes lakes, ponds, glaciers > 1 km^{2} (0.386 sq mi or 247 acres) and river estuaries.

Briarres-sur-Essonne (French pronunciation: [bʁijaʁ syʁ ɛsɔn], literally Briarres on Essonne) is a commune in the Loiret department in north-central France.

== Population ==
Historical population
Year	Pop.	±% p.a.
1968	267	—
1975	278	+0.58%
1982	294	+0.80%
1990	491	+6.62%
1999	532	+0.90%
2007	580	+1.09%
2012	510	−2.54%
2017	544	+1.30%
2023	527	−0.53%
Source: INSEE

== See also ==
- Communes of the Loiret department
