= Ahti =

Water deity of Finnish mythology

- King of the Sea; King of Water
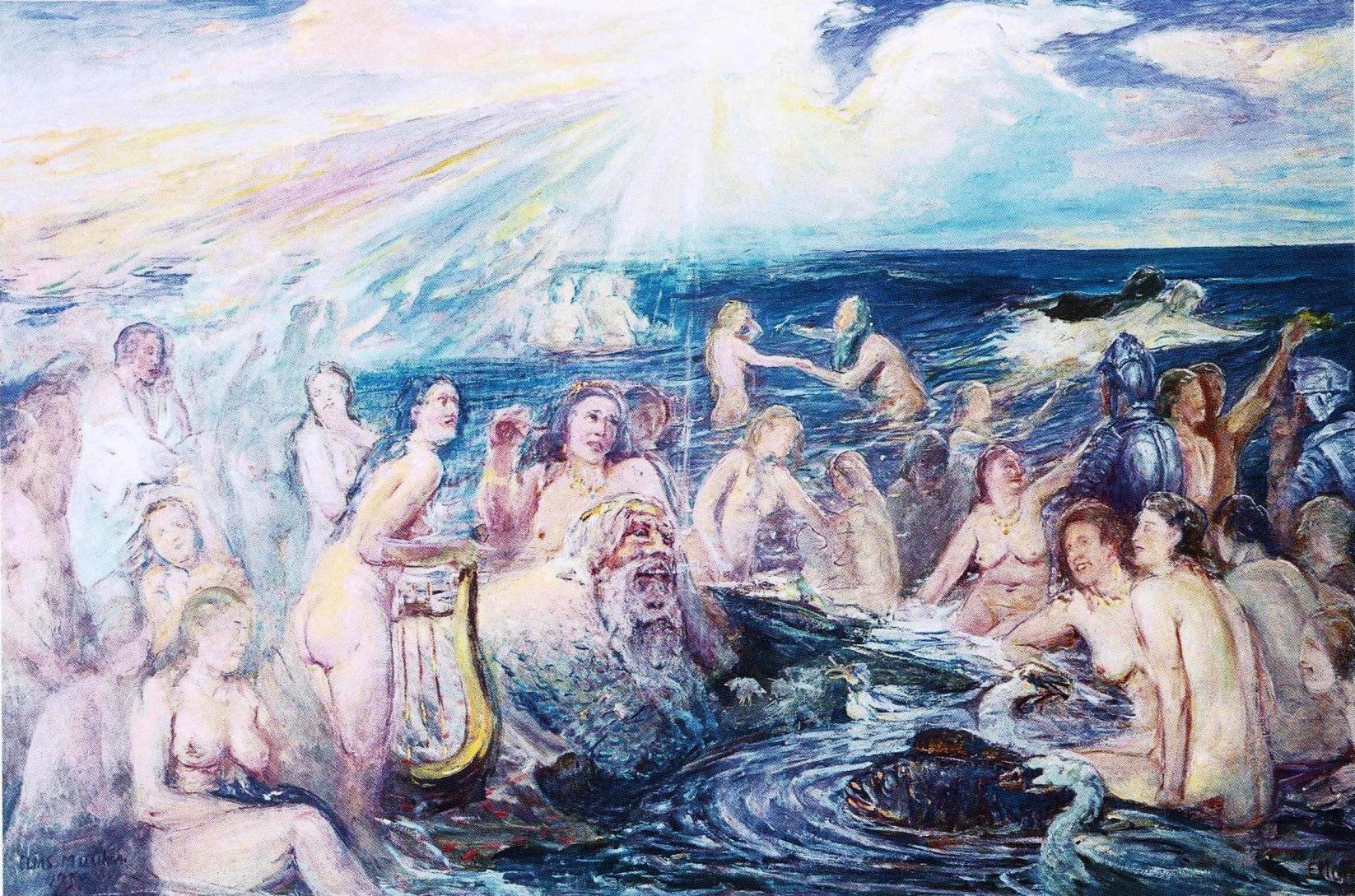
- In the Kingdom of Ahti (1934) by Elias Muukka
- Other names: Ahto, Ahvo
- Abode: Water
- Gender: Male
- Ethnic group: Finns, Karelians

Genealogy
- Spouse: Vellamo
- Offspring: Vellamo's maiden

Ahti is a water god in Finnish mythology.

In the Kalevala, he is referred to with the name Ahto in order to not confuse him with the separate character Ahti Saarelainen.

== Name ==
In the 18th century, the name Ahti was connected to Greek: Nils Idman connected the name to the epithet Áktios 'coastal', which is given to Pan by Theocritus and to Apollo by Apollonius of Rhodes. Christfried Ganander connected the name to Actaeon in his 1789 book Mythologia Fennica.

Initial theory for the origin of the name Ahti was in the North Germanic word ahva 'water', or in the same family of words (ægir, 'sea'). Domenico Comparetti connected the name to the North Germanic word agi, aga 'restlessness, sailing'. Torsten Evert Karsten pointed out how the name Ahti appears for multiple different individuals in runic songs, and saw it as a shorter form of the Viking name Ahti-hariʀ, which later developed into Óttarr (Ohthere). Kaarle Krohn wondered if Ahti is a proper noun at all, or if it simply has the meaning 'haltija'. He also tried to prove the name actually means Saint Andrew.

According to a later theory, Ahti's name could come from the verb ahtaa 'to hang fishnets to dry'. A net drying rack is ahde. Similar words are found across Uralic languages. This would make Ahti a god who guarantees luck in seining. Mikko K. Heikkilä thought the name came from Sámi *āhččē 'father, master spirit'. Martti Haavio connected the name Ahti to the Ingrian word nahti 'seal', making Ahti the haltija of seals, but this etymology is uncertain.

== Description ==
Ahti was first mentioned in writing in 1551 by Mikael Agricola as the one who gave fish from water (Achti wedhest caloia toi). Ganander called Ahti a sea haltija who gave fish and who shipwrecked fishermen called for help. In this function, as a giver of fish, he only appears in runic songs from Kainuu, addressed as Meren kultanen kuninkas, / Meren Ahti armollinen 'Golden King of the Sea, merciful Ahti of the Sea' and asked to give perches. Vellamo is also mentioned as the Mistress of Water and the ruler of Ahti's trench. The only other mention of Ahti (Ahto in this song) as a giver of fish is from a song written down by Zacharias Topelius the Elder from possibly North Ostrobothnia, but the authenticity of this song has been questioned. Haavio suggested this song could've been created by Anders Aspegren (1678–1751), but pointed out that the form Ahto was not invented by any one person but also exists among folk tradition. Based on Aspegren, Daniel Juslenius called Ahti "Neptune, sea god, Nixie". Gustaf Renvall saw Ahti as female.

The name Ahti does also appear in other contexts in runic songs. He is said to have "given" something earlier and is asked to come as money is being shared. Ganander called Ahti the "God of Wealth". These verses are connected to hunting songs, where the "Golden King of the Forest, merciful Ahti of the Forest" is asked to give prey. Ahti also appears in healing spells in various forms: Ahti of the Sea, Water, Forest, Land, and Wind. White Karelian healing spells describe, for example, if an illness came from the forest and you used water to heal it, you prayed to Ahti of the Forest and Ahti of Water. Ahti of Water's sacred healing water had to be "bought" with gold and silver.

In Ingria, the name Ahti appears in hylje spells. Hylje means a seal, as well as various skin inflammations which were healed with seal fat. The runic songs speak of "pile of fat, merciful Ahti of Water", leading Haavio to assume Ahti was originally Nahti, the divine ancestor of seals. Anna-Leena Siikala thought the runic songs did not prove this theory of Ahti as a seal haltija, as the Kainuu songs point towards seine fishing, though as the ruler over water he was in control of seals as well.

The Kainuu line went Anna Ahti ahvenia 'Ahti, give us perches'. The more widespread version goes Anna Antti ahvenia, Pekka pieniä kaloja 'Andrew give us perches, Peter (give us) small fish'. Siikala considered the line with Ahti to be more archaic, and the one with Christian saints to be a later-born catchphrase.

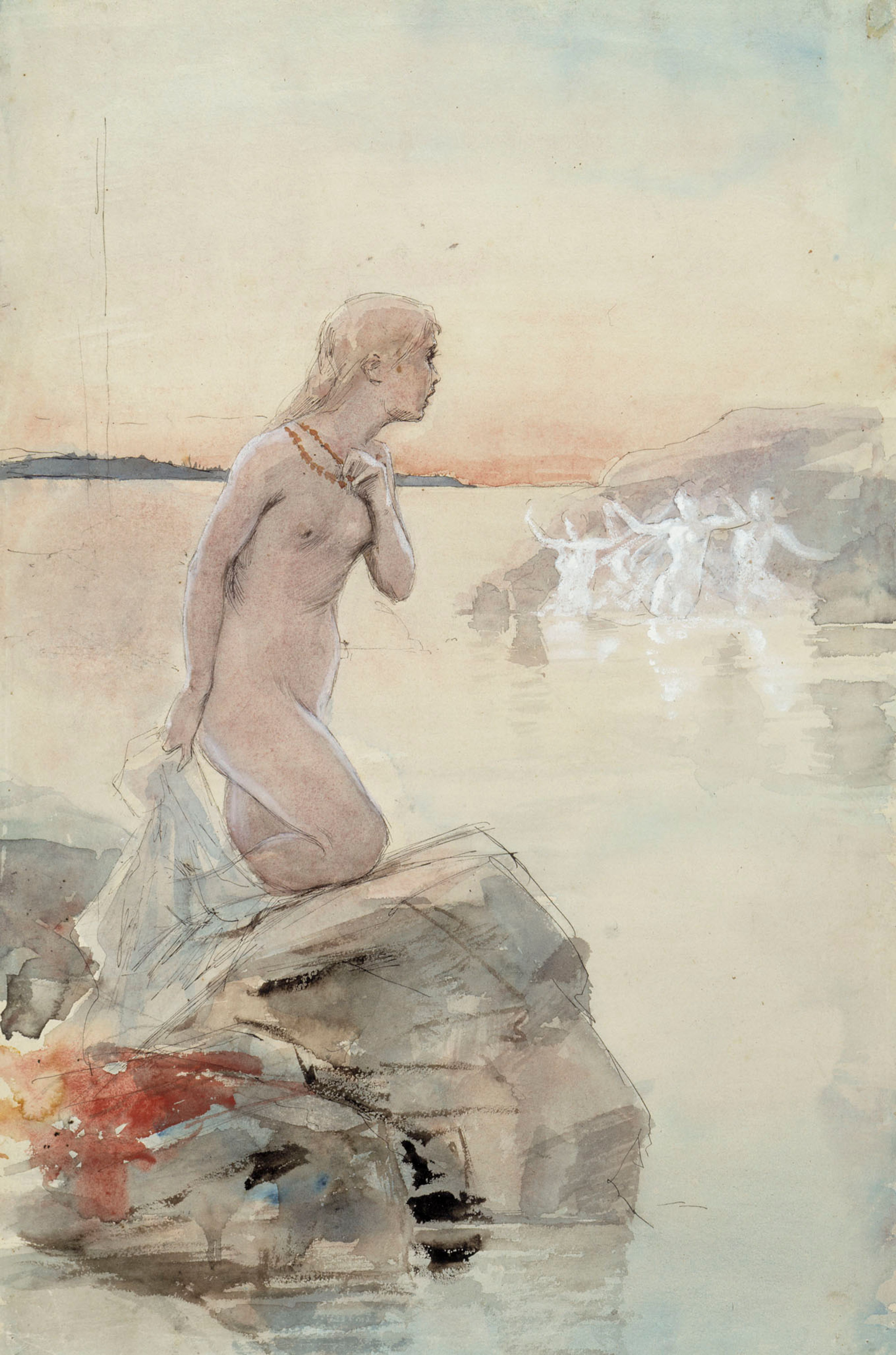
Aino and water maidens which were inspired by the Watery maiden of Vellamo, Ahti's only child. "Aino" by Albert Edelfelt (1935).

A Karelian runic song describes a hero, such as Väinämöinen, catching a fish he tries to cut and eat. The fish jumps away, revealing herself to be a "watery maiden of Vellamo" and "Ahti's only child", mocking the hero for not noticing this. A similar song exists from Estonia, but in the Estonian version the fish is caught by seining and only begs to be spared when already taken indoors. The Karelian song was one of the multiple ones Elias Lönnrot used to create the character of Aino in the Kalevala.

== Epithets ==
Epithet	Epithet meaning	Regions
Meren kultainen kuningas Veen kultainen kuningas	'Golden King of the Sea' 'Golden King of Water'	Kainuu, Ladoga Karelia, North Ostrobothnia, Olonets Karelia, White Karelia
Meren Ahti armollinen Veen Ahti armollinen Vien Ahvo armohiinen	'Merciful Ahti of the Sea' 'Merciful Ahti of Water'	Ingria, Kainuu, North Ostrobothnia, South Karelia, White Karelia
Meren Ahti vaahtivaippa Vein Ahti vaahtipaita	'Ahti of the Sea in a cloak of foam' 'Ahti of the Sea in a shirt of foam'	North Karelia, White Karelia
Meren ukko, ruokorinta Vein ukko, ruohoparta	'Old man of the sea, breast of reed' 'Old man of water, beard of grass'	North Ostrobothnia, White Karelia
Veen Ahti auollinen	'Blissful Ahti of Water'	White Karelia
Hylehytty, rasvamytty	'Seal hytty, pile of fat' *Hytty has meant structures in which tar was burned or bog iron was processed	Ingria
Vien kaunone kananen	'Beautiful chicken of water'	Ingria
Vein Ahti, aimo poika	'Ahti of Water, proper lad'	Olonets Karelia
Ahti aaltoen isäntä	'Ahti, master of waves'	White Karelia
Satahauvan hallitsija	'Ruler of a hundred trenches'	White Karelia

== In the Kalevala ==
Ahti is the name of the king or god of the sea, and Ahtola is his sea-castle. His wife is Vellamo, and they live together at the bottom of the sea. The Sampo comes into his possession and he is unwilling to return it.

In the Kalevala, Ahto appears in Rune XLI; in Rune XLII, where Väinämöinen charms him with his magic harp playing; in Rune XLIII, where the Sampo is lost in the sea; and in Rune XLVIII, where he is briefly mentioned.

In a fable similar to Mercury and the Woodman, Ahto dives to return the lost knife of a shepherd, out of pity. He first finds a gold knife, and then a silver knife, but the shepherd does not claim them as his. The third knife Ahto retrieves is the correct one; as a reward for his honesty, Ahto gives the shepherd all three.
