= Pierre (lwa) =

Pierre (also Pié/Pyé) is a lwa and family thereof of Haitian Vodou, largely unique to Northern Haiti. Pierre is the syncretized form of the Christian Saint Peter: anthropologist George Eaton Simpson writes that further than the Christian syncretism present in Haitian Vodou, Pierre has been fully integrated as a lwa into the Northern Haitian Vodou pantheon.

Pierre and the Pierre family of lwa are favored in Northern Haiti over the macabre, vulgar Gede lwa; Haitian writer Déita pointed to the influence of 19th-century Catholic evangelism in Haiti, particularly by the Brothers of Christian Instruction, for "instilling the fear of death" into Northern Haitian vodouisants.

== List of lwa ==
- Anaisa Pye
- Pié Anfalo
- Pié Damballa
- Pierre Balawe
- Pierre Dambala
- Pierre Dambara

=== Papa Pierre ===
Papa Pierre is a stoic, martial lwa that causes floods. He lives beneath fresh water. He wears a red and gray robe, and prefers the colors red, white and black. Typical offerings to Papa Pierre are tafia, roosters and goats.
