= Villabé =

Commune in Île-de-France, France

- Commune
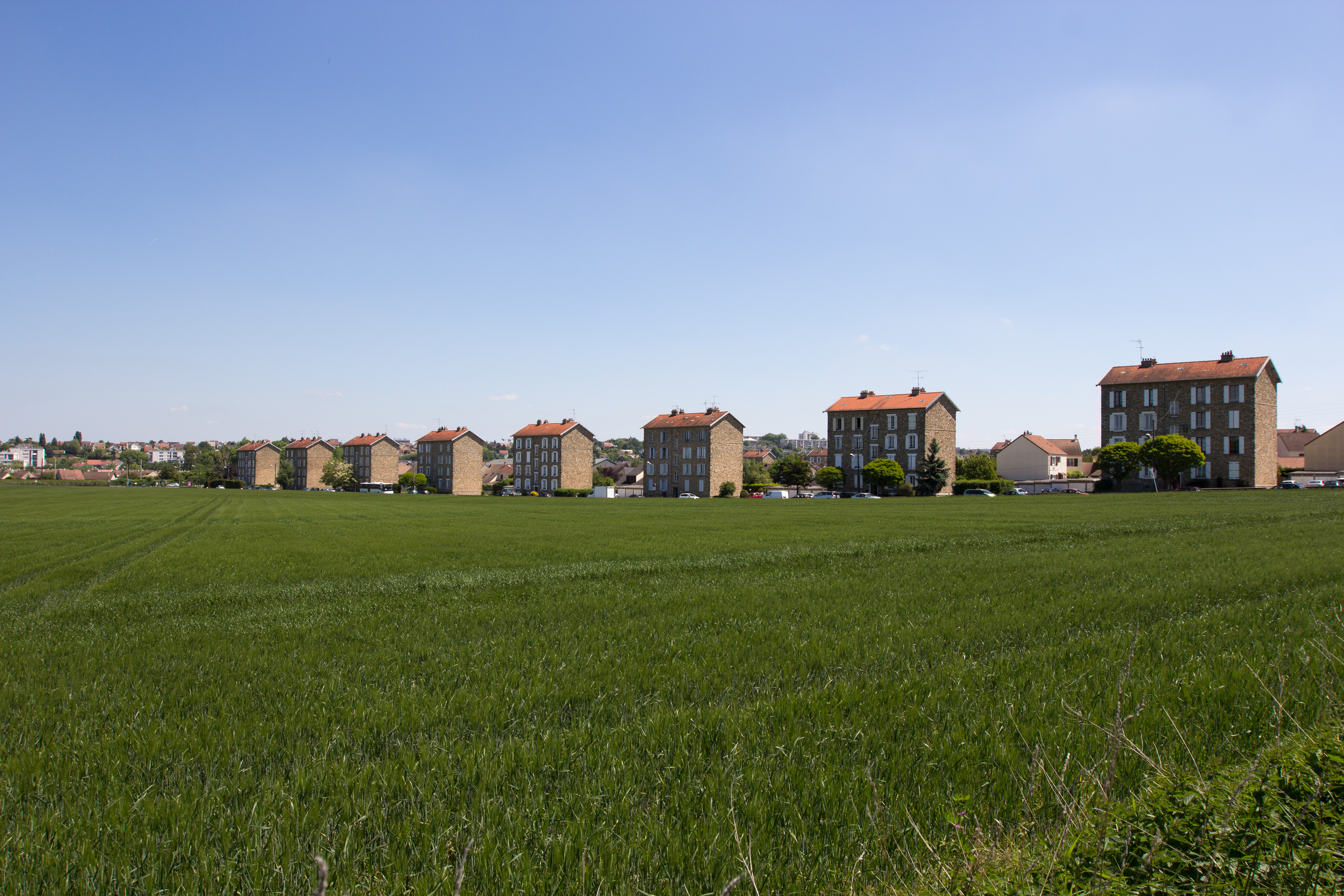
- Buildings in Villabé

- Coat of arms
- Location of Villabé
- Location within France Location within Île-de-France (region)
- Coordinates: 48°35′20″N 2°27′13″E
- Country: France
- Region: Île-de-France
- Department: Essonne
- Arrondissement: Évry
- Canton: Corbeil-Essonnes
- Intercommunality: CA Grand Paris Sud Seine-Essonne-Sénart

Government
  - Mayor (2020–2026): Karl Dirat
- Area^{1}: 4.56 km^{2} (1.76 sq mi)
- Highest elevation: 89 m (292 ft)
- Lowest elevation: 40 m (130 ft)
- Population (2023): 5,830
  - Density: 1,280/km^{2} (3,310/sq mi)
- Time zone: UTC+01:00 (CET)
  - Summer (DST): UTC+02:00 (CEST)
- INSEE/Postal code: 91659 /91100
- ^{1} French Land Register data, which excludes lakes, ponds, glaciers > 1 km^{2} (0.386 sq mi or 247 acres) and river estuaries.

Villabé (French pronunciation: [vilabe]) is a commune in the Essonne department in Île-de-France in northern France.

== Population ==
Inhabitants of Villabé are known as Villabéens in French.

Historical population
Year	Pop.	±% p.a.
1968	1,727	—
1975	1,980	+1.97%
1982	2,554	+3.70%
1990	2,995	+2.01%
1999	4,832	+5.46%
2007	4,852	+0.05%
2012	5,168	+1.27%
2017	5,438	+1.02%
2023	5,830	+1.17%
Source: INSEE

== See also ==
- Communes of the Essonne department
