= Sekkei-ji =

Buddhist temple in Kōchi, Japan

- 雪蹊寺
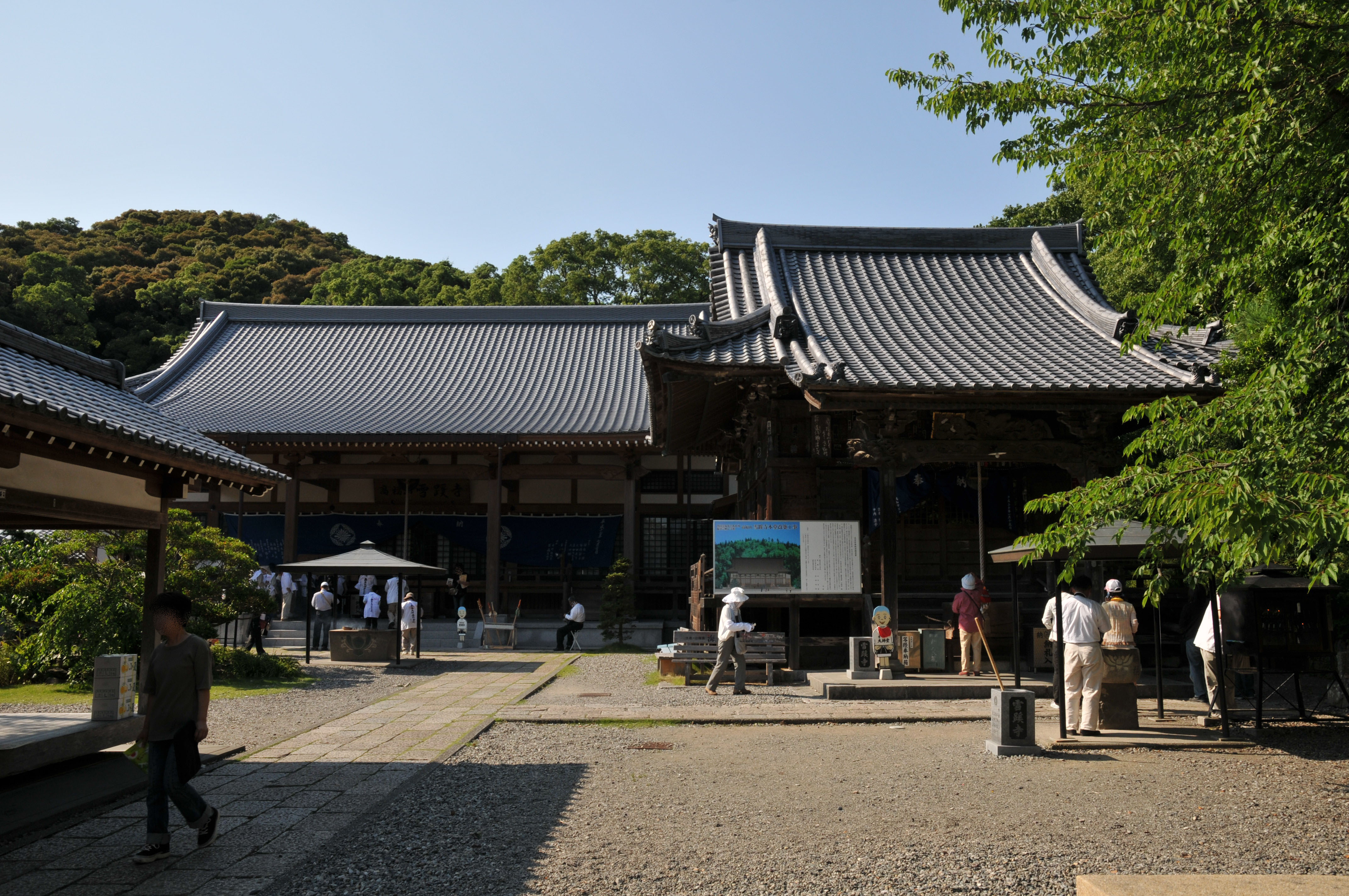

Religion
- Affiliation: Shingon

Location
- Location: Kōchi-ken
- Country: Japan
- Interactive map of Sekkei-ji
- Coordinates: 33.5008°N 133.5431°E

Website
- http://www.88shikokuhenro.jp/33sekeiji/

Sekkei-ji is a Shingon Buddhist Temple located in Kōchi, Kōchi, Japan. It is the 33rd temple of the Shikoku Pilgrimage.

== History ==
According to the temple records, Kukai founded the temple, and named it Shourinsan Koufukuji (少林山高福寺 lit. Small Grove Mountain, Great Luck Temple).

The statues that flank the main Honzon on the left and right are thought to be created by the great sculptor Tankei in the year at the beginning of the Karoku era, 1225. However there are no records of Tankei having any relation to the Tosa domain. There is also an explanation that sometime during the Kamakura period, Unkei along with his eldest son Tankei had arrived at the temple and renamed it “Keiun-ji” (慶運寺).

Following the Kamakura period, the temple was in ruins, but during the Tensho era (1573-1593) a new priest that was a supporter of Chosokabe Motochika during the Sengoku period, revived the temple as a Rinzai Zen temple. During the fourth year of the Keicho era (1599) Chosokabe Motochika died of illness, and the temple became the bodaiji of the Chosokabe family. The present day temple name was taken from the posthumous priest name of Chosokabe Motochiki to become Sekkei-ji.

Following the expulsion of Buddhism during the Meiji era, the temple was abandoned in 1870, the following year Hada Shrine was built in order to house the statue shintai of Chosokabe Motochika.
