= Écharcon =

Commune in Île-de-France, France

- Commune
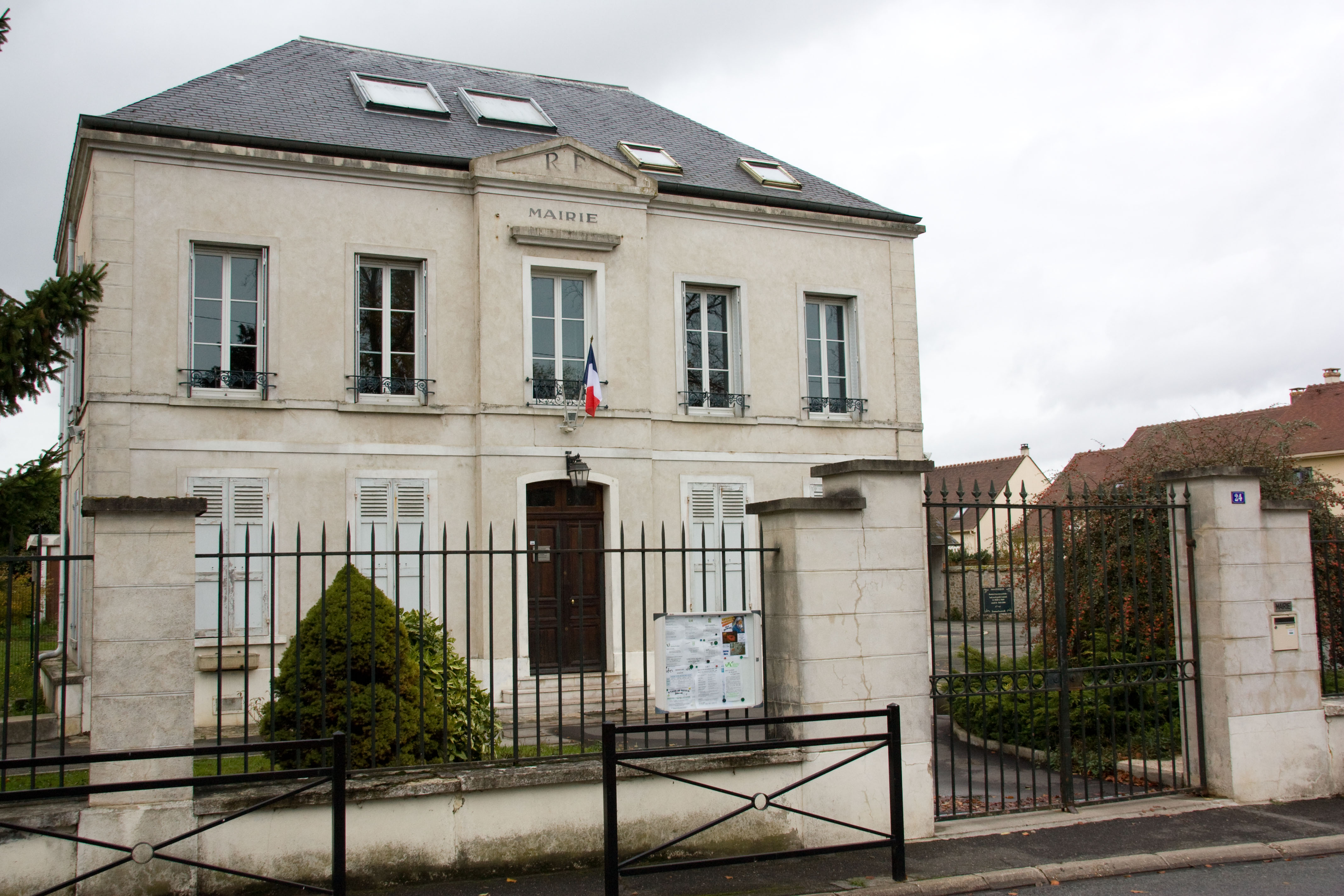
- The town hall of Echarcon

- Coat of arms
- Location of Écharcon
- Location within France Location within Île-de-France (region)
- Coordinates: 48°34′23″N 2°24′50″E
- Country: France
- Region: Île-de-France
- Department: Essonne
- Arrondissement: Évry
- Canton: Corbeil-Essonnes
- Intercommunality: Val d'Essonne

Government
  - Mayor (2020–2026): Gérard Rassier
- Area^{1}: 6.81 km^{2} (2.63 sq mi)
- Highest elevation: 115 m (377 ft)
- Lowest elevation: 44 m (144 ft)
- Population (2023): 708
  - Density: 104/km^{2} (269/sq mi)
- Time zone: UTC+01:00 (CET)
  - Summer (DST): UTC+02:00 (CEST)
- INSEE/Postal code: 91204 /91540
- ^{1} French Land Register data, which excludes lakes, ponds, glaciers > 1 km^{2} (0.386 sq mi or 247 acres) and river estuaries.

Écharcon (French pronunciation: [eʃaʁkɔ̃]) is a commune in the Essonne department in Île-de-France in northern France.

Inhabitants of Écharcon are known as Écharconnais.

== See also ==
- Communes of the Essonne department
