= Acionna =

Gallo-Roman water goddess in the Orléanais region

Acionna was a Gallo-Roman water goddess, attested in the Orléanais region.

In 1822, Jean-Baptiste Jollois, one of the founding fathers of archaeology in the region, carried out excavations on the so-called "fontaine de l'Étuvée", an ancient water-source which he artificially drained to rediscover if it could still supply the town's public water fountains. In a former cesspit, he found a roughly square (0.6m by 0.55m) stone tablet with a well-preserved votive inscription, datable by its style to the 2nd century. It reads:

AUG(ustae) ACIONNAE
SACRUM
CAPILLUS ILLIO
MARI F(ilius) PORTICUM
CUM SUIS ORNA
MENTIS V(otum) S(olvit) L(ibens) M(erito)

"To August Acionna, Capillus son of Illiomarus [offered] this portico with these ornaments, in willing and right fulfillment of his vow"

Acionna is not attested in any other sources, but the ending -onna indisputably indicates a Latinized Gallic name. The stela's findspot in an ancient source suggests that she is a water goddess. Her name may be linked to that of the river Essonne - Axiona, Exona, in medieval texts - whose source is in the slopes to the north of the forêt d'Orléans (this river's upper course is today called the Œuf and only takes up the name Essonne at its junction with the Rimarde). Another river of the forêt d'Orléans, the "Esse" or "Ruisseau des Esses", flowing south into the sea in the Bionne (a Celtic name), might also have borne this name.

Acionna probably had her sanctuary at the Fontaine de l'Etuvée in the commune of Orléans and remains of a Gallo-Roman temple and a section of an aqueduct were excavated in 2007.

== Bibliography ==
- Jollois, J.-B.- Notice sur les nouvelles fouilles entreprises dans l'emplacement de la fontaine de l'Étuvée et sur les antiquités qu'on y a découvertes, in : Annales de la Société royale des Sciences, Belles-Lettres et Arts d'Orléans, tome 7, 1824, pp. 143–167 - (publication princeps de l'inscription et reproduction lithographiée);
- CIL, XIII, 3063;
- Debal, J.- Cenabum, Aurelianis, Orléans.- Presses universitaires de Lyon, 1996 - (coll. Galliæ civitates) ISBN 2-7297-0554-6
