= Nootaikok =

Inuit deity

In Inuit mythology, Nootaikok was a spirit who presided over and lived inside icebergs and glaciers. Along with Agloolik, the spirit led hunters to seals.
