= Tosa Bay =

Bay in Kochi Prefecture, Japan

Coordinates: 33°10′N 133°33′E

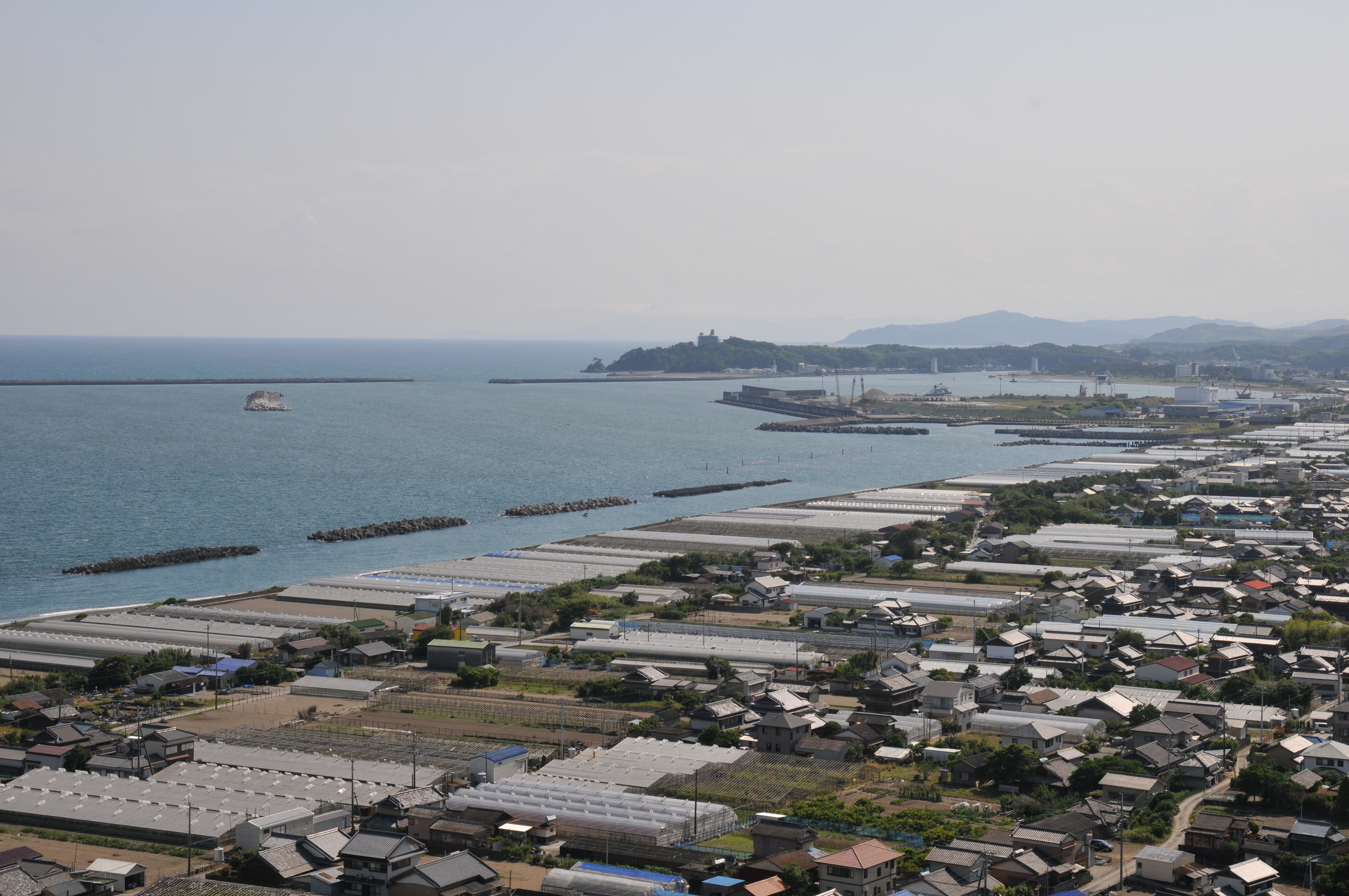
from Zenjibu-ji

Location of Tosa Bay

Tosa Bay (Japanese: 土佐湾) is a bay north of the line connecting Cape Muroto and Cape Ashizuri in Kochi Prefecture, Japan. Tosa Bay is one of the better fishing grounds in Japan, and strongly affected by the Kuroshio Current.
