= Funadama =

Japanese deity said to protect boats

- God of protection and luck at sea
- Other names: Funadamagū (船玉宮), Funadama Myōjin (船玉明神), Funadama Bosatsu (船玉菩薩)
- Kanji.: 船霊, 船玉, or 船魂
- Abodes: Ships, the sea
- Gender: Female

Equivalents
- Chinese folk religion equivalent: Mazu
- Shinto equivalents: Sumiyoshi, Sarutahiko Ōkami, Konpira Gongen, Watatsumi, Takeminakata, Ototachibana-hime, Ryūjin, Ōmononushi
- Buddhist equivalents: Śākyamuni Buddha, Vairocana, Guanyin, Bhaisajyaguru, Avalokiteśvara, Shuyajin, Benzaiten

Funadama (船霊, 船玉, or 船魂; lit. “Spirit of the Ship”) is a kami in Japanese mythology that protects boats and sailors. Usually identified as female, she is variably said to be either a single god or a group.

== History ==
Funadama is first mentioned in the Shoku Nihongi, within an entry dated to 763, stating that Japanese envoys were able to return home from a storm due to prayers to Funadama.

The first ship we sent to Goryeo was called Noto 能登. On the day of return, the wave was deadly and the ship drifted at sea. [Upon return] they prayed to Funadama, saying, “Thanks to the protection of Funadama, we returned safely to Japan. We are now asking the government to reward the envoy with a cotton crown.”

— The Shoku Nihongi

Later, in the 10th century, the Funadama were described as a group of four gods from present-day Wakayama Prefecture who assisted Empress Jingū’s campaign in Korea.

In the mid-Heian period, several shrines to Funadama (Funadama Jinja, 船玉神社) were built, mostly as subsidiaries of larger shrines. The Engishiki describes a subsidiary shrine of Sumiyoshi Shrine in Osaka dedicated to Funadama. These shrines continued in popularity throughout medieval times.

In the Tokugawa period, belief in Funadama was very popular among sailors and fishermen. No longer restrained to shrines, ships began to insert a hole in the mast, in which a pair of figures representing Funadama and other objects were placed. The Matsunoya hikki reads:

Inside the hole of the mast were a pair of god figurines, a lock of hair of the ship owner’s wife, and sugoroku 双六 (double six, a Japanese board game). They called these three items Funadama.

— Tomokiyo Oyamada, Matsunoya hikki

People would also pray to Funadama for good luck when a new ship was launched, and a ceremony at the beginning of each year had fishermen pray to her for a plentiful harvest and the ability to return home safely.

It is speculated that Funadama belief began with the belief that ships have souls, and a later belief in the Edo period, as a result of fusion with the goddess Mazu, led to Funadama being identified and named as a god that protects ships.

== Identification ==
Funadama has been identified with many gods. Of these gods, Mazu is the most associated. By the late 18th century, images of Funadama had increasingly looked like Mazu.

Tanikawa Kotosuga's Wakun shiori and Terashima Ryōan's Wakan sansai zue aligned Funadama with both Sumiyoshi and Mazu. Some sources aligned the Funadama with Sarutahiko. Other texts preferred a Buddhist view of Funadama, associating her with Śākyamuni Buddha, Dainichi Nyorai, and Kannon.

Other gods identified with Funadama include:

From Shinto; Konpira no kami, Ōwata-sumi no kami, Suwa Daimyōjin, Ebisu, Toyotamahime, Ototachibanahime, Ryūjin, and Ōsugi Daimyōjin.

From Buddhism; Yakushi Nyorai, Kanzeon Bosatsu, Shuyajin, and Benzaiten.

== Modern worship ==
The Nagatoro Funadama Festival (Funadama Matsuri) is held yearly on August 15th in Nagatoro, Saitama. The festival dates back to the Tokugawa period.
