= Ved-ava =

Deity

- Fertility and water goddess
- Other names: Vedmastor-ava; Ved-azěrava
- Adherents: Newlyweds; Women trying to conceive
- Ethnic group: Mordvin

Ved-ava, also called Vedmastor-ava (water-mother) or Ved-azěrava (water-hostess) is a water and fertility deity, common to several Finno-Ugric peoples traditionally dependent on fishing. Among the Mordvins (an area in what is now Western Russia) she was the Water Mother, ruler of the waters and their bounty, as well as an important fertility deity.

== Description ==
She is generally depicted as a water creature resembling a mermaid, with long hair, large breasts, and the lower body of a fish complete with tail, and is sometimes said to play or sing, seducing humans with her music. Ved-ava also sometimes appears as a young girl or as a grown woman with hanging breasts. Fishermen sacrificed to her the first of their catch and observed numerous taboos related to her while fishing. She was originally mainly a fertility goddess, with her form as a mermaid and association with drowning coming later.

In Mordvin tradition, she was the protector of marriage, childbirth, love, and fertility. Young couples hoping to have children would pray to her, and infertility was often ascribed to her being angry with whomever was suffering it.

== Rituals ==
One important ritual for Mordvins was that newly married women would be taken straight from the nuptial bed to the river, so she could be submerged. This was to allow Ved-ava to assist in the delivery of the woman's future children.

Another ritual, this one performed when there is difficulty conceiving a child, involves a woman tying small bells to a live rooster, then taking it to the river at midnight. She would then pray to Ved-ava, and then toss the rooster into the water as an offering. Another common offering to Ved-ava is a basket containing oatmeal, millet, hops, and a kopek. In this case, after the offering is given, the woman knocks on the door of her house and says "The wood to be dried up, I to be swollen up,". Prayers for forgiveness were usually done alongside these rituals.
