= Ken Norton (disambiguation) =

Ken Norton (1943–2013) was an American professional boxer.

Ken Norton may also refer to:

- Ken Norton Jr. (born 1966), American football coach and former linebacker
- Kendrick Norton (born 1997), American football defensive tackle
- Ken Norton (basketball) (c. 1914–1996), American basketball coach
- Ken Norton (cricketer) (1932–2018), English cricketer

== See also ==
- Ken Morton (born 1947), English footballer
