= Alexander Harvey (physicist) =

British physicist (1904–1987)

Alexander Harvey CPhys FInstP
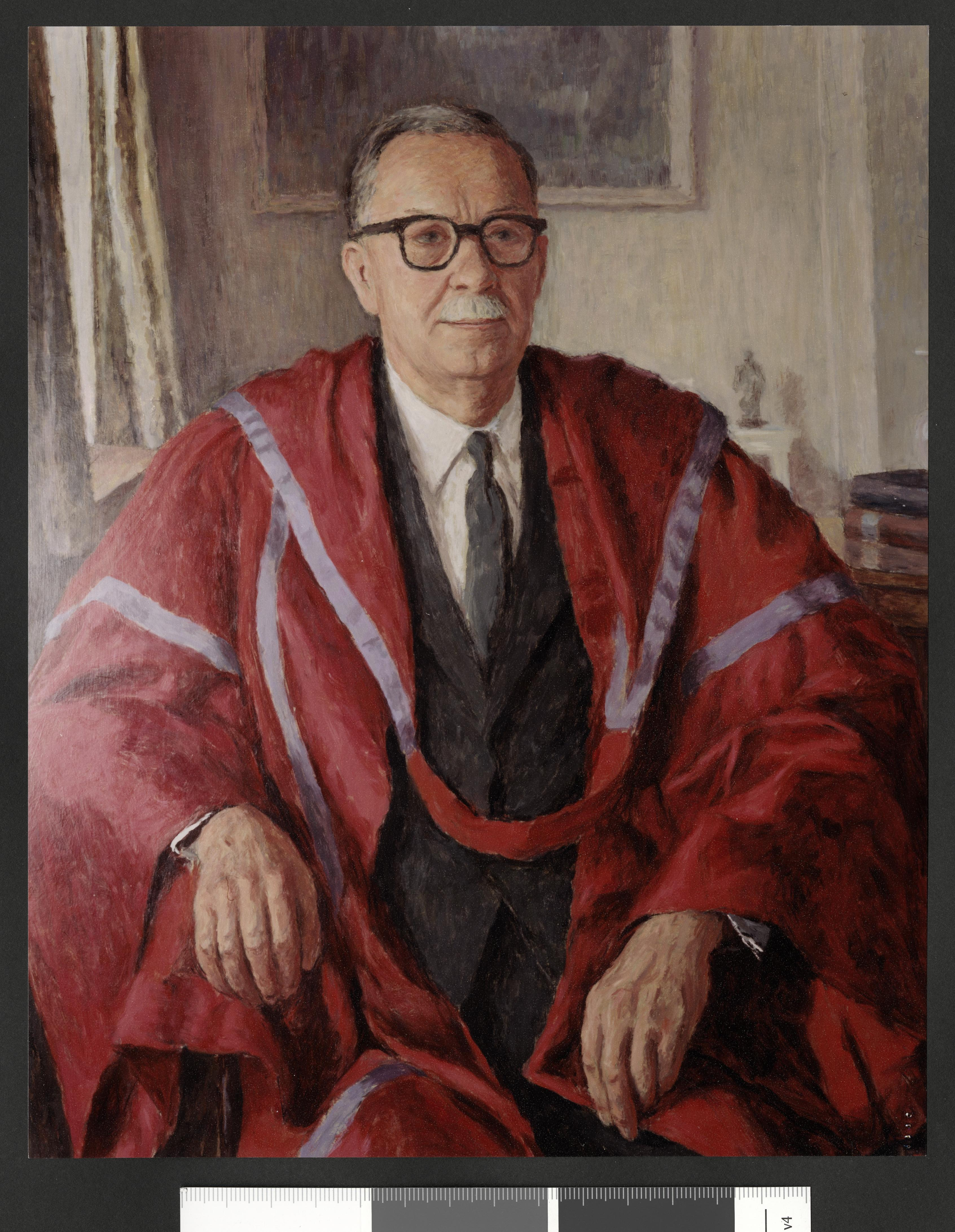
- Portrait of Principal Alexander Harvey by Evan Charlton, c. 1970s
- Born: 21 September 1904; Tyneside, England
- Died: 16 October 1987 (aged 83); Ely Hospital, Cardiff, Wales
- Resting place: Thornhill Cemetery
- Education: Gateshead Grammar School; Armstrong College, Durham University
- Scientific career
- Fields: Physics
- Workplaces: University of California; Adam Hilger, Ltd; University of Manchester; Wigan Mining and Technical College; Scunthorpe Technical School; University of Wales Institute of Science and Technology

Alexander Harvey (21 September 1904 – 16 October 1987) was an English physicist and educator, best known for his 22-year tenure as principal of University of Wales Institute of Science and Technology (a predecessor of the present day Cardiff University) from 1946 to 1968.

== Early life and education ==
Harvey was born on 21 September 1904 in Tyneside, England. His father, Andrew Harvey, was originally from Bangor, County Down, Northern Ireland. He was educated at Gateshead Grammar School and Armstrong College, Durham University (now Newcastle University). He earned a Bachelor of Science in Physics and later a Doctor of Philosophy degree for his work on molecular spectra.

== Career ==
Harvey was a Commonwealth Fund Fellow in Physics at University of California, Berkeley from 1929 to 1931. Returning to England, he worked as a scientific assistant at Adam Hilger, Ltd in London from 1931 to 1933 before becoming an assistant lecturer at University of Manchester from 1933 to 1934. For the next 8 years he headed the Physics department of Wigan Mining and Technical College. He became principal of Scunthorpe Technical School in 1942 and served in this post until 1946.

Harvey served as principal of Cardiff Technical College from 1946 to 1968. His tenure saw the institution transitioning from a technical college to a university, renaming to Welsh College of Advanced Technology in 1966 and eventually University of Wales Institute of Science and Technology in 1968. The college was also expanded during this time, marked by the construction of the Redwood Building in Cathays Park in 1961.

== Publications ==
- Bryson, Thomas; Harvey, Alexander (1938). Science For Miners.
- Harvey, Alexander (1973) [1966]. "One Hundred Years of Technical Education in Cardiff". In Williams, Stewart (ed.). Glamorgan Historian. Vol. 9. pp. 173–190.
