= Gateshead High School =

Gateshead High School may refer to:

- Gateshead High School for Boys, previous school on the site of Gateshead Grammar School
- Gateshead High School for Girls, previous name of one of the schools which merged to form Newcastle High School for Girls
