= JLC =

JLC may refer to:

- Jaeger-LeCoultre, a Swiss watch and clock manufacturer
- Jewish Labor Committee
- Jewish Leadership Council, British charity
- John Leggott College, a college in North Lincolnshire, England

== People ==
- Joshua Lawrence Chamberlain, American Civil War general
- Jenna-Louise Coleman, an English actress
- John le Carré, pen name of British author David Cornwell
- Justin Lee Collins, a British comedian, radio and television presenter
- Jamie Lee Curtis, an American actress
- John Lloyd Cruz, Filipino actor
- Jason La Canfora, an American sports writer and television analyst
