= Kathleen Gales =

English statistician and academic (1927–1995)

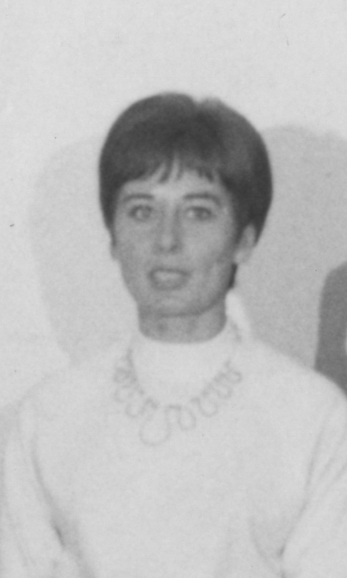
- Gales in 1969
- Born: Kathleen Emily Gales; 2 December 1927
- Died: 5 April 1995 (aged 67)
- Other names: Kathleen Emily Spitz; Mrs Heinz Spitz
- Education: Gateshead Grammar School; Newnham College, Cambridge; Ohio University
- Spouse: Heinz Spitz (m. 1970)
- Scientific career
- Fields: Statistics
- Workplaces: Foster Wheeler; Birmingham Municipal Statistical Office; London School of Economics

Kathleen Emily Gales (2 December 1927 – 5 April 1995) was an English statistician, known for being the first woman lecturer at the Department of Statistics at the London School of Economics (LSE).

== Career ==
Gales was educated at Gateshead Grammar School before matriculating at Newnham College, Cambridge, where she earned her BA in 1950. A scholarship recipient, she went on to earn a Master's degree from Ohio University in 1951. Before becoming a lecturer at LSE, Gales worked as an assistant statistician at Foster Wheeler and as a statistician at the Municipal Statistical Office in Birmingham. She was elected as a Fellow of the Royal Statistical Society in 1954.

Gales joined LSE in 1955 as a research assistant and part-time lecturer. She was promoted to Senior Lecturer in 1966 and held this position until her retirement in 1990.

=== Research ===
In 1964, Gales worked with Brian Abel-Smith on a study of British and Irish doctors' migration patterns. They found that of the doctors who had migrated away from the UK and Ireland, "expressed general objections to the principle of a National Health Service", contrary to the views of John R. Seale.

Gales was briefly a visiting professor in the Department of Sociology at University of California, Berkeley from 1964 to 1965. Her visiting professorship coincided with the start of the Free Speech Movement on campus, which was the subject of one of her studies, published in the British Journal of Sociology in 1966. Returning to the UK, Gales collaborated on another study of student activism at LSE in 1967 alongside Tessa Blackstone (later Baroness Blackstone), Roger Hadley, and Wyn Lewis. The work was published as a monograph in 1970.

== Personal life ==
In 1970, Gales married Heinz Spitz, a schoolteacher of Maths and Sciences based in London. Spitz was a Jewish refugee who had fled Nazi-occupied Austria and arrived in the UK as part of the Kindertransport scheme in 1939. Gales died in 1995.

== Publications ==
- Moser, C. A.; Gales, Kathleen; Morpurgo, P. W. R. (1962). Dental Health and the Dental Services: An Assessment of Available Data. Oxford University Press and the Nuffield Provincial Hospitals Trust.
- Abel-Smith, Brian; Gales, Kathleen (1964). British doctors at home and abroad. Occasional Papers on Social Administration. Vol. 8. Codicote Press.
- Blackstone, Tessa; Gales, Kathleen; Hadley, Roger; Lewis, Wyn (1970). Students in Conflict: LSE in 1967. LSE Research Monographs. Vol. 5. London School of Economics and Political Science.

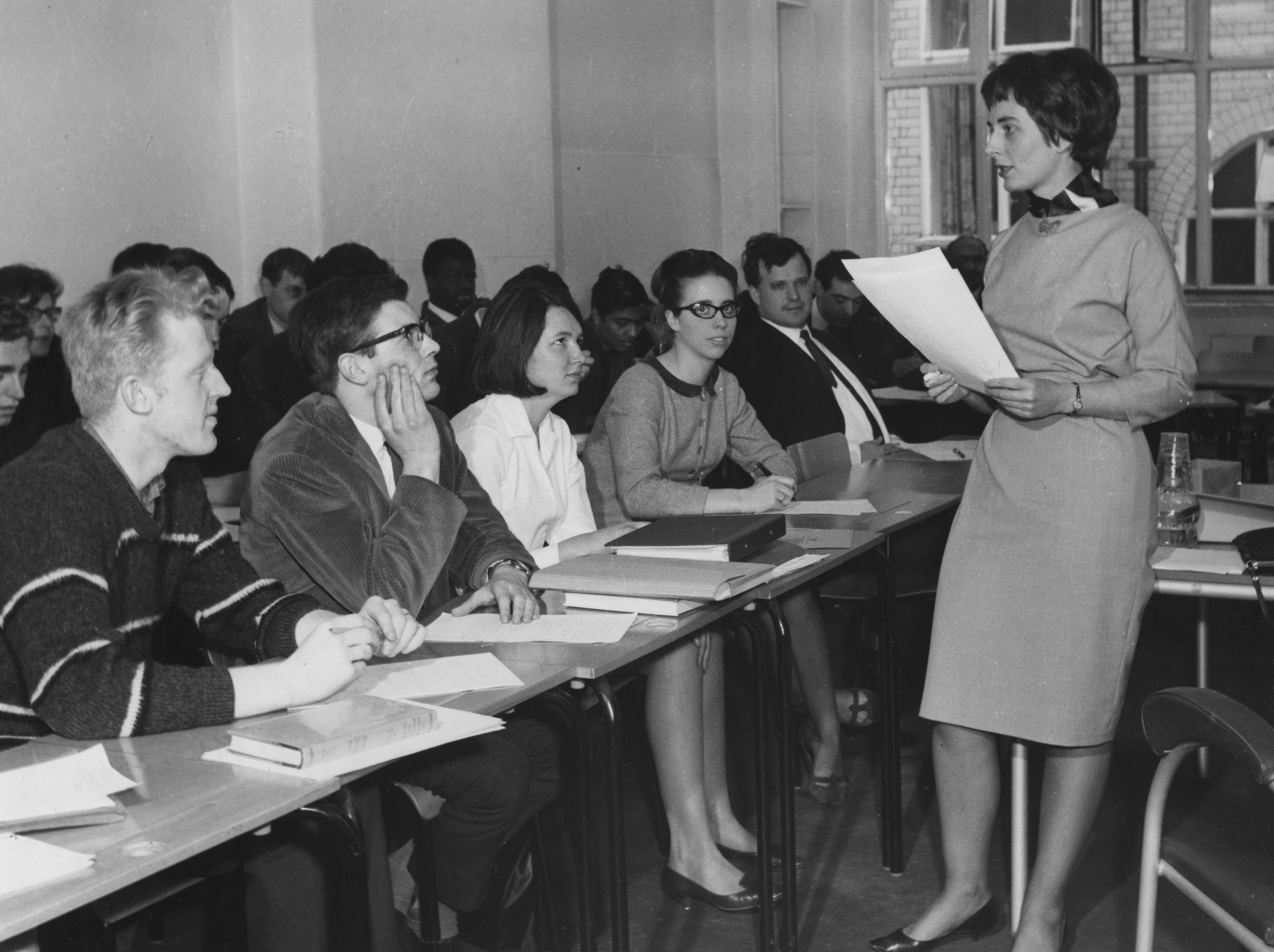
Gales delivering a lecture at LSE in 1964.

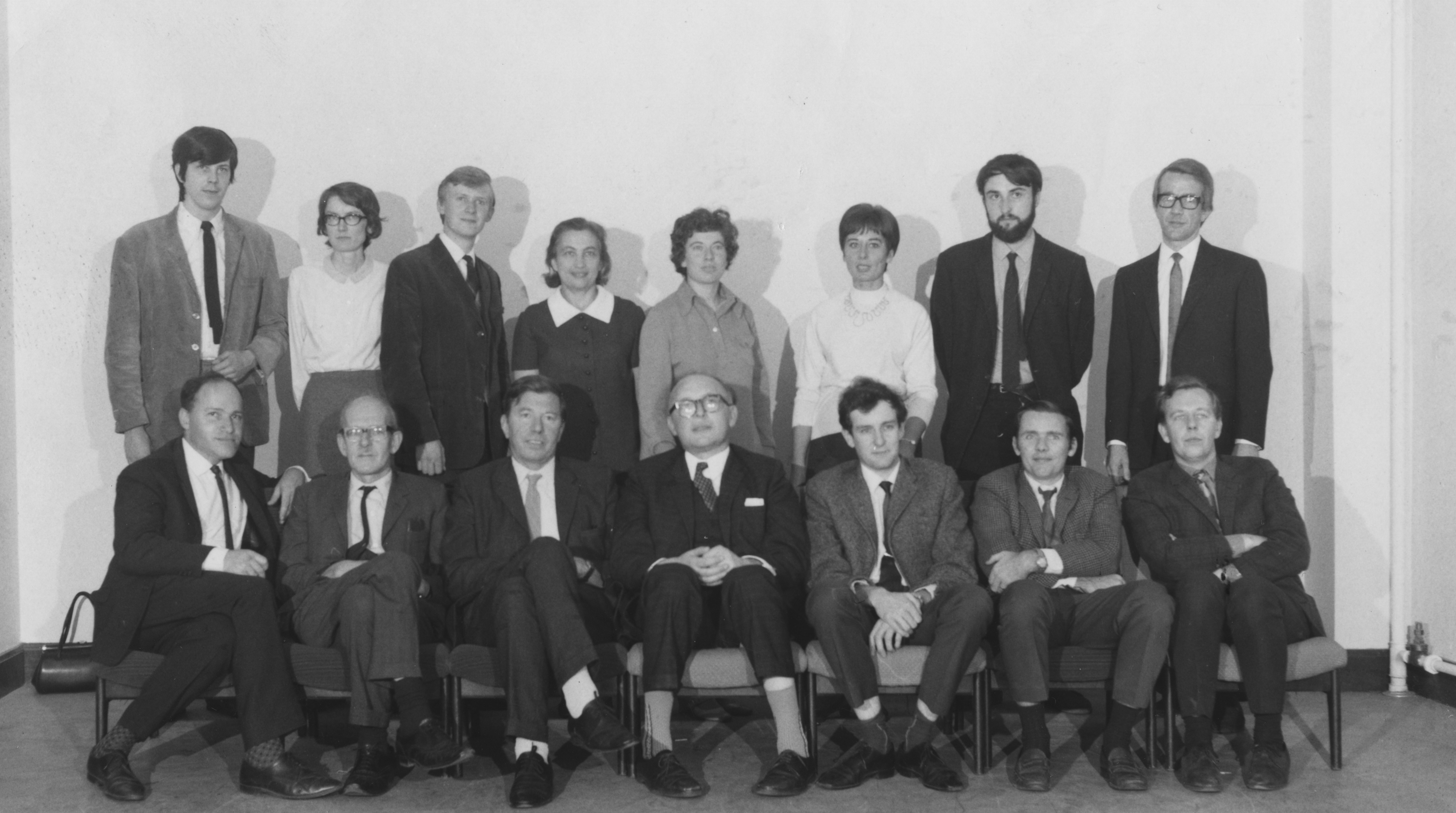
Gales (standing, third from the right) with colleagues at LSE's Department of Statistics in 1969.
