= Lyndon LaRouche =

American political activist (1922–2019)

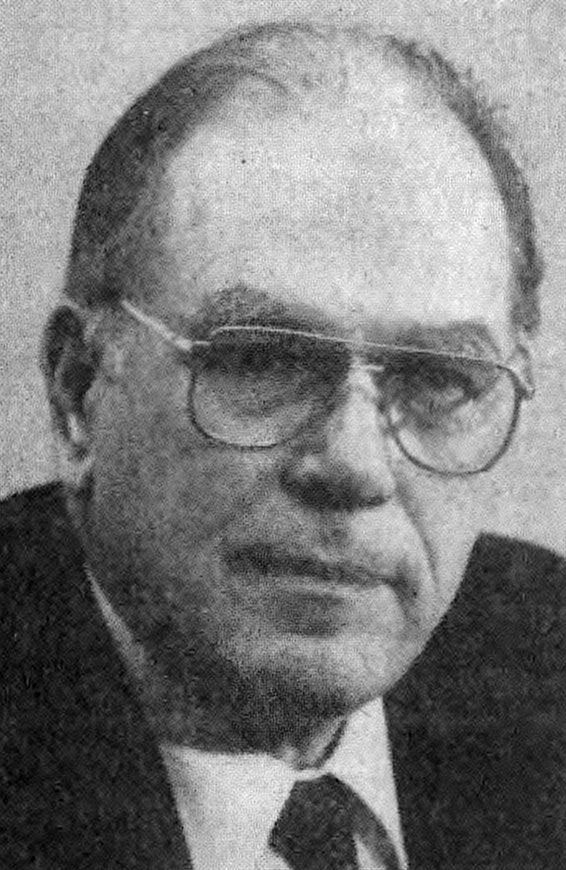
- LaRouche in 1988
- Born: Lyndon Hermyle LaRouche Jr. September 8, 1922; Rochester, New Hampshire, U.S.
- Died: February 12, 2019 (aged 96)
- Other name: Lyn Marcus
- Education: Northeastern University (no degree)
- Organization: National Caucus of Labor Committees
- Political party: Socialist Workers (1949–1964); U.S. Labor (1973–1979); Democratic (from 1979)
- Movement: LaRouche movement
- Spouses: Janice Neuberger (m. 1954; div. 1963); Helga Zepp (m. 1977)

Signature

Leader of the U.S. Labor Party
- In office 1973–1979
- Preceded by: Party established
- Succeeded by: Party dissolved

Lyndon Hermyle LaRouche Jr. (September 8, 1922 – February 12, 2019) was an American political activist who founded the LaRouche movement and its main organization, the National Caucus of Labor Committees (NCLC). He was a prominent conspiracy theorist and perennial presidential candidate. He began in far-left politics in the 1940s and later supported the civil rights movement; however, in the 1970s, he moved to the far-right. His movement is sometimes described as, or likened to, a cult. Convicted of fraud, he served five years in prison from 1989 to 1994.

Born in Rochester, New Hampshire, LaRouche was drawn to socialist and Marxist movements in his twenties during World War II. In the 1950s, while a Trotskyist, he was also a management consultant in New York City. By the 1960s, he became engaged in increasingly smaller and more radical splinter groups. During the 1970s, he created the foundation of the LaRouche movement and became more engaged in conspiratorial beliefs and violent and illegal activities. Instead of the radical left, he embraced radical right politics and antisemitism. At various times, he alleged that he had been targeted for assassination by Queen Elizabeth II, Zionist mobsters, his own associates (whom he said had been drugged and brainwashed by CIA and British spies), in addition to others.

It is estimated that the LaRouche movement never exceeded a few thousand members, but it had an outsized political influence, raising more than $200 million by one estimate, and running candidates in more than 4,000 elections in the 1980s. It was noted for disguising its candidates as conservative Democrats and harassing opponents. It reached its height in electoral success when Larouchite candidates won the Democratic primaries for the 1986 Illinois gubernatorial election and related state offices; this alarmed Democratic Party officials, whose national spokesman called the Larouchites "kook fringe". The defeated mainstream Democratic candidates ran in the general election as members of the Illinois Solidarity Party; the Larouchite Democrats all finished a distant third. Later in the 1980s, as part of the LaRouche criminal trials, criminal investigations led to convictions of several LaRouche movement members, including LaRouche himself. He was sentenced to 15 years' imprisonment but served only five.

LaRouche was a perennial candidate for President of the United States. He ran in every election from 1976 to 2004 as a candidate of third parties established by members of his movement, peaking at around 78,000 votes in the 1984 United States presidential election. He also tried to gain the Democratic presidential nomination. In the 1996 Democratic Party presidential primaries, he received 5% of the total nationwide vote. In 2000, he received enough primary votes to qualify for delegates in some states, but the Democratic National Committee refused to seat his delegates and barred LaRouche from attending the Democratic National Convention.

== Early life ==
LaRouche was born in Rochester, New Hampshire, the oldest of three children of Jessie Lenore (née Weir) and Lyndon H. LaRouche Sr. His paternal grandfather's family emigrated to the United States from Rimouski, Quebec, whereas his maternal grandfather was born in Scotland. His father worked for the United Shoe Machinery Corporation in Rochester before the family moved to Lynn, Massachusetts.

His parents became Quakers after his father converted from Catholicism. They forbade him from fighting with other children, even in self-defense, which he said led to "years of hell" from bullies at school. As a result, he spent much of his time alone, taking long walks through the woods and identifying in his mind with great philosophers. He wrote that, between the ages of 12 and 14, he read philosophy extensively, embracing the ideas of Leibniz and rejecting those of Hume, Bacon, Hobbes, Locke, Berkeley, Rousseau, and Kant. He graduated from Lynn English High School in 1940. In the same year, the Lynn Quakers expelled his father from the group, for reportedly accusing other Quakers of misusing funds, while writing under the pen name Hezekiah Micajah Jones. LaRouche and his mother resigned in sympathy with his father.

=== University studies, Marxism, marriage ===
LaRouche attended Northeastern University in Boston and left in 1942. He later wrote that his teachers "lacked the competence to teach me on conditions I was willing to tolerate". As a Quaker, he was a conscientious objector during World War II and joined a Civilian Public Service camp in lieu of military service. In 1944, he decided to enlist in the United States Army and served with the Medical Corps in India and Burma during the Burma campaign. At the end of the war, he was working as a clerk in the Ordnance Corps, and later described his decision to enlist as the most important decision of his life. In his 1988 autobiography, LaRouche said that being asked to express his views on the death of President Franklin D. Roosevelt to a group of fellow G.I.s led him to define his "principal lifelong political commitment, that the United States should take postwar world leadership in establishing a world order dedicated to promoting the economic development of developing nations.

LaRouche wrote that, while in the conscientious objector camp, he discussed Marxism, and while traveling home on the SS General Bradley in 1946, he met Donald Merrill, a fellow soldier, also from Lynn, who converted him to Trotskyism. Back in the U.S., he resumed his education at Northeastern University but dropped out. He returned to Lynn in 1948 and the next year joined the Socialist Workers Party (SWP) to recruit at the GE River Works there, adopting the name "Lyn Marcus" for his political work. He arrived in New York City in 1953, where he worked as a management consultant. In 1954 he married Janice Neuberger, a member of the SWP. Their son, Daniel, was born in 1956.

== Career ==
=== 1960s ===
==== Teaching and the National Caucus of Labor Committees ====
Twenty to thirty students would ... sit on the floor surrounding LaRouche, who now sported a very shaggy beard ... LaRouche gave them esoteric assignments, such as searching through the writings of Georges Sorel to discover Rudd's anarchistic origins, or studying Rosa Luxemburg's The Accumulation of Capital.

— Tim Wohlforth

By 1961, the LaRouches were living on Central Park West in Manhattan, and LaRouche's activities at that time were mostly focused on his career and not on the SWP. He and his wife separated in 1963, and he moved into a Greenwich Village apartment with another SWP member, Carol Schnitzer, also known as Larrabee. In 1964 he began an association with an SWP faction called the Revolutionary Tendency, a faction later expelled from the SWP, and came under the influence of British Trotskyist leader Gerry Healy.

For six months, LaRouche worked with American Healyite leader Tim Wohlforth, who later wrote that LaRouche had a "gargantuan ego" and "a marvelous ability to place any world happening in a larger context, which seemed to give the event additional meaning, but his thinking was schematic, lacking factual detail and depth." Leaving Wohlforth's group, LaRouche briefly joined the rival Spartacist League before announcing his intention to build a new Fifth International.

In 1967, LaRouche began teaching classes on Marx's dialectical materialism at New York City's Free School, and attracted a group of students from Columbia University and the City College of New York, recommending that they read Das Kapital, as well as Hegel, Kant, and Leibniz. During the 1968 Columbia University protests, he organized his supporters under the name National Caucus of Labor Committees (NCLC). The aim of the NCLC was to win control of the Students for a Democratic Society (SDS) branch – the university's main activist group – and build a political alliance between students, local residents, organized labor, and the Columbia faculty. By 1973, the NCLC had over 600 members in 25 cities – including West Berlin and Stockholm – and produced what LaRouche's biographer, Dennis King, called the most literate of the far-left papers, New Solidarity. The NCLC's internal activities became highly regimented over the next few years. Members gave up their jobs and devoted themselves to the group and its leader, believing it would soon take control of America's trade unions and overthrow the government.

=== 1970s ===
==== 1971: Intelligence network ====
Robert J. Alexander writes that LaRouche first established an NCLC "intelligence network" in 1971. Members all over the world sent information to NCLC headquarters, which would distribute the information via briefings and other publications. LaRouche organized the network as a series of news services and magazines, which critics say was done to gain access to government officials under press cover. The publications included Executive Intelligence Review, founded in 1974. Other periodicals under his aegis included New Solidarity, Fusion Magazine, 21st Century Science and Technology, and Campaigner Magazine. His news services and publishers included American System Publications, Campaigner Publications, New Solidarity International Press Service, and The New Benjamin Franklin House Publishing Company. LaRouche acknowledged in 1980 that his followers impersonated reporters and others, saying it had to be done for his security. In 1982, U.S. News & World Report sued New Solidarity International Press Service and Campaigner Publications for damages, alleging that members were impersonating its reporters in phone calls.

U.S. sources told The Washington Post in 1985 that the LaRouche organization had assembled a worldwide network of government and military contacts, and that his researchers sometimes supplied information to government officials. Bobby Ray Inman, the CIA's deputy director in 1981 and 1982, said LaRouche and his wife had visited him, offering information about the West German Green Party. A CIA spokesman said LaRouche met Deputy Director John McMahon in 1983 to discuss one of LaRouche's trips overseas. An aide to Deputy Secretary of State William Clark said when LaRouche's associates discussed technology or economics, they made good sense and seemed qualified. Norman Bailey, formerly with the U.S. National Security Council, said in 1984 that LaRouche's staff comprised "one of the best private intelligence services in the world. ... They do know a lot of people around the world. They do get to talk to prime ministers and presidents." Several government officials feared a security leak from the government's ties with the movement. According to critics, the supposed behind-the-scenes processes were more often flights of fancy than inside information. Douglas Foster wrote in Mother Jones in 1982 that the briefings consisted of disinformation, "hate-filled" material about enemies, phony letters, intimidation, fake newspaper articles, and dirty tricks campaigns. Opponents were accused of being gay or Nazis, or were linked to murders, which the movement called "psywar techniques".

From the 1970s to the first decade of the 21st century, LaRouche founded several groups and companies. In addition to the National Caucus of Labor Committees, there was the Citizens Electoral Council (Australia), the National Democratic Policy Committee, the Fusion Energy Foundation, and the U.S. Labor Party. In 1984, he founded the Schiller Institute in Germany with his second wife, and three political parties there – the Europäische Arbeiterpartei, Patrioten für Deutschland, and Bürgerrechtsbewegung Solidarität – and in 2000 the Worldwide LaRouche Youth Movement. His printing services included Computron Technologies, Computype, World Composition Services, and PMR Printing Company, Inc, or PMR Associates.

==== 1973: Political shift; "Operation Mop-Up" ====
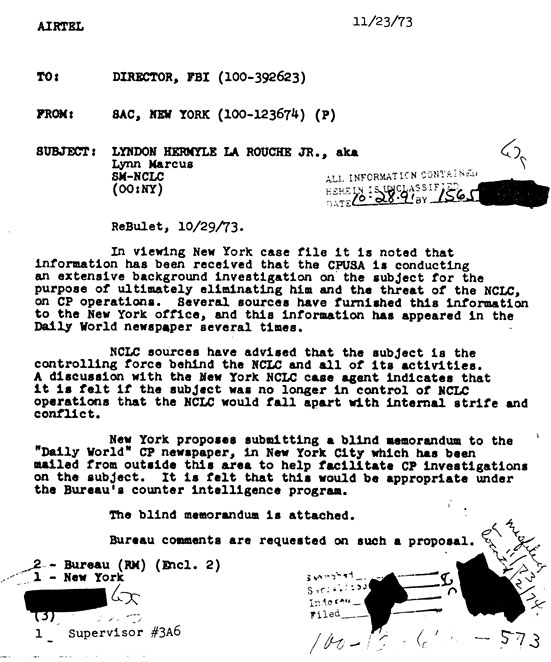
A 1973 internal FBI letter, noting the Communist Party's efforts to eliminate LaRouche, and suggesting submission of a "blind memorandum" to the Communist Party's newspaper

LaRouche wrote in his 1987 autobiography that violent altercations had begun in 1969 between his NCLC members and several New Left groups when Mark Rudd's faction began assaulting LaRouche's faction at Columbia University. Press accounts alleged that between April and September 1973, during what LaRouche called "Operation Mop-Up", NCLC members began physically attacking members of leftist groups that LaRouche classified as "left-protofascists"; an editorial in LaRouche's New Solidarity said of the Communist Party that the movement "must dispose of this stinking corpse". Armed with chains, bats, and martial-art nunchuk sticks, NCLC members assaulted Communist Party, SWP, and Progressive Labor Party members and Black Power activists on the streets and during meetings. At least 60 assaults were reported. The operation ended when police arrested several of LaRouche's followers; there were no convictions, and LaRouche maintained they had acted in self-defense. Journalist and LaRouche biographer Dennis King writes that the FBI may have tried to aggravate the strife, using measures such as anonymous mailings, to keep the groups at each other's throats. LaRouche said he met representatives of the Soviet Union at the United Nations in 1974 and 1975 to discuss attacks by the Communist Party USA on the NCLC and propose a merger, but said he received no assistance from them. One FBI memo, obtained under the Freedom of Information Act, proposes assisting the CPUSA in an investigation "for the purpose of ultimately eliminating him [LaRouche] and the threat of the NCLC" (see image to left).

LaRouche's critics, such as King and Antony Lerman, allege that in 1973, with little warning, LaRouche adopted more extreme ideas, a process accompanied by a campaign of violence against his opponents on the left, and the development of conspiracy theories and paranoia about his personal safety. According to these accounts, he began to believe he was under threat of assassination from the Soviet Union, the CIA, Libya, drug dealers, and bankers. He also established a "Biological Holocaust Task Force", which, according to LaRouche, analyzed the public health consequences of International Monetary Fund (IMF) austerity policies for impoverished nations in Africa, and predicted that epidemics of cholera as well as possibly entirely new diseases would strike Africa in the 1980s.

==== 1973: U.S. Labor Party ====
LaRouche founded the U.S. Labor Party in 1973 as the political arm of the NCLC. At first, the party was "preaching Marxist revolution"; however, by 1977, it shifted from left-wing to right-wing politics. A two-part article in The New York Times in 1979 by Howard Blum and Paul L. Montgomery alleged that LaRouche had turned the party (at that point with 1,000 members in 37 offices in North America, and 26 in Europe and Latin America) into an extreme-right, antisemitic organization, despite the presence of Jewish members. LaRouche denied the newspaper's charges, and said he had filed a $100 million libel suit; his press secretary said the articles were intended to "set up a credible climate for an assassination hit".

The Times alleged that members had taken courses in how to use knives and rifles; that a farm in upstate New York had been used for guerrilla training; and that several members had undergone a six-day anti-terrorist training course run by Mitchell WerBell III, an arms dealer and former member of the Office of Strategic Services who said he had ties to the CIA. Journalists and publications the party regarded as unfriendly were harassed, and it published a list of potential assassins it saw as a threat. LaRouche expected members to devote themselves entirely to the party, place their savings and possessions at its disposal, and take out loans on its behalf. Party officials decided who each member should live with, and if someone left the movement, the remaining member was expected to live separately from the ex-member. LaRouche questioned spouses about their partner's sexual habits, the Times said, and in one case reportedly ordered a member to stop having sex with his wife, because it was making him "politically impotent".

==== 1973: "Ego-stripping" and "brainwashing" allegations ====
LaRouche began writing in 1973 about the use of certain psychological techniques on recruits. In an article called "Beyond Psychoanalysis", he wrote that a worker's persona had to be stripped away to arrive at a state he called "little me", from which it would be possible to "rebuild their personalities around a new socialist identity", according to The Washington Post. The New York Times wrote that the first such session – which LaRouche called "ego-stripping" – involved a German member, Konstantin George, in the summer of 1973. LaRouche said that during the session he discovered that a plot to assassinate him had been implanted in George's mind.

He recorded sessions with a 26-year-old British member, Chris White, who had moved to England with LaRouche's former partner, Carol Schnitzer. In December 1973 LaRouche asked the couple to return to the U.S. His followers sent tapes of the subsequent sessions with White to The New York Times as evidence of an assassination plot. According to the Times, "[t]here are sounds of weeping, and vomiting on the tapes, and Mr. White complains of being deprived of sleep, food and cigarettes. At one point someone says 'raise the voltage', but [LaRouche] says this was associated with the bright lights used in the questioning rather than an electric shock." The Times wrote: "Mr. White complains of a terrible pain in his arm, then LaRouche can be heard saying, 'That's not real. That's in the program'." LaRouche told the newspaper White had been "reduced to an eight-cycle infinite loop with look-up table, with homosexual bestiality". He said White had not been harmed and that a physician – a LaRouche movement member – had been present throughout. White ended up telling LaRouche he had been programmed by the CIA and British intelligence to set up LaRouche for assassination by Cuban exile frogmen.

According to The Washington Post, "brainwashing hysteria" took hold of the movement. One activist said he attended meetings where members were writhing on the floor saying they needed deprogramming. In two weeks in January 1974, the group issued 41 separate press releases about brainwashing. One activist, Alice Weitzman, expressed skepticism about the claims.

=== 1974: Contacts with far-right groups, intelligence gathering ===
LaRouche established contacts with Willis Carto's Liberty Lobby and elements of the Ku Klux Klan in 1974. Frank Donner and Randall Rothenberg wrote that he made successful overtures to the Liberty Lobby and George Wallace's American Independent Party, adding that the "racist" policies of LaRouche's U.S. Labor Party endeared it to members of the Ku Klux Klan. George Michael, in Willis Carto and the American Far Right, says that LaRouche shared with Carto an antipathy towards the Rockefeller family. The Liberty Lobby defended its alliance with LaRouche by saying the U.S. Labor Party had been able to "confuse, disorient, and disunify the Left".

Gregory Rose, a former chief of counter-intelligence for LaRouche who became an FBI informant in 1973, said that while the LaRouche movement had extensive links to the Liberty Lobby, there was also copious evidence of a connection to the Soviet Union. George and Wilcox say neither connection amounted to much – they assert that LaRouche was "definitely not a Soviet agent" and state that while the contact with the Liberty Lobby is often used to imply "'links' and 'ties' between LaRouche and the extreme right", it was in fact transient and marked by mutual suspicion. The Liberty Lobby soon pronounced itself disillusioned with LaRouche, citing his movement's adherence to "basic socialist positions" and his softness on "the major Zionist groups" as fundamental points of difference. According to George and Wilcox, American neo-Nazi leaders expressed misgivings over the number of Jews and members of other minority groups in his organization, and did not consider LaRouche an ally. George Johnson, in Architects of Fear, similarly states that LaRouche's overtures to far right groups were pragmatic rather than sincere. A 1975 party memo spoke of uniting with these groups only to overthrow the established order, adding that once that goal had been accomplished, "eliminating our right-wing opposition will be comparatively easy".

Howard Blum wrote in The New York Times that, from 1976 onward, party members sent reports to the FBI and local police regarding members of left-wing organizations. In 1977, he wrote, commercial reports on U.S. anti-apartheid groups were prepared by LaRouche members for the South African government, student dissidents were reported to the Shah of Iran's Savak secret police, and the anti-nuclear movement was investigated on behalf of power companies. Johnson says the intelligence network was made up of "obnoxious devotees commandeering WATS lines and tricking bureaucrats into giving them information". By the late 1970s, members were exchanging almost daily information with Roy Frankhouser, a government informant and infiltrator of both far right and far left groups who was involved with the Ku Klux Klan and the American Nazi Party. The LaRouche organization believed Frankhouser to be a federal agent who had been assigned to infiltrate right-wing and left-wing groups, and that he had evidence that these groups were actually being manipulated or controlled by the FBI and other agencies. LaRouche and his associates considered Frankhouser to be a valuable intelligence contact, and took his links to extremist groups to be a cover for his intelligence work. Frankhouser played into these expectations, misrepresenting himself as a conduit for communications to LaRouche from "Mr. Ed", an alleged CIA contact who did not exist in reality.

Blum wrote, at around this time, that LaRouche's Computron Technologies Corporation included Mobil Oil and Citibank among its clients, that his World Composition Services had one of the most advanced typesetting complexes in the city and had the Ford Foundation among its clients, and that his PMR Associates produced the party's publications and some high school newspapers.

Around the same time, according to Blum, LaRouche was telling his membership several times a year that he was being targeted for assassination, including by the Queen of the United Kingdom, Zionist mobsters, the Council on Foreign Relations, the Justice Department, and Mossad. LaRouche sued the City of New York in 1974, saying the CIA and British spies had tortured and drugged his associates to brainwash his associates into killing him. According to The Patriot-News of Harrisburg, Pennsylvania, LaRouche said he had been "threatened by Communists, Zionists, narcotics gangsters, the Rockefellers and international terrorists." LaRouche later said:

Since late 1973, I have been repeatedly the target of serious assassination threats and my wife has been three times the target of attempted assassination. ... My enemies are the circles of McGeorge Bundy, Henry Kissinger, Soviet General Secretary Yuri Andropov, W. Averell Harriman, certain powerful bankers, and the Socialist and Nazi Internationals, as well as international drug traffickers, Colonel Gaddafi, Ayatollah Khomeini, and the Malthusian lobby.

==== 1975–1976: presidential campaign ====
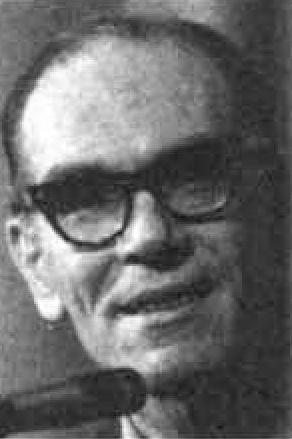
LaRouche, 1976

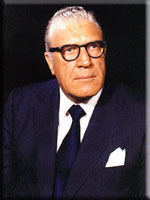
In 1975 Clarence M. Kelley, FBI Director, called the NCLC a "violence-oriented organization".

In March 1975, Clarence M. Kelley, director of the FBI, testified before the House Appropriations Committee that the NCLC was "a violence-oriented organization of 'revolutionary socialists' with a membership of nearly 1,000 in chapters in some 50 cities". He said that during the previous two years its members had been "involved in fights, beatings, using drugs, kidnappings, brainwashings, and at least one shooting. They are reported to be armed, to have received defensive training such as karate, and to attend cadre schools and training schools to learn military tactics".

In 1975, under the name Lyn Marcus, LaRouche published Dialectical Economics: An Introduction to Marxist Political Economy, described by its only reviewer as "the most peculiar and idiosyncratic" introduction to economics he had ever seen. Mixing economics, history, anthropology, sociology and a surprisingly large helping of business administration, the work argued that most prominent Marxists had misunderstood Marx, and that bourgeois economics arose when philosophy took a wrong, reductionist turn under British empiricists like Locke and Hume.

In 1976, LaRouche campaigned for the first time in a presidential election as a U.S. Labor Party candidate, polling 40,043 votes (0.05%). It was the first of eight consecutive presidential elections in which he ran between 1976 and 2004. It enabled him to attract $5.9 million in federal matching funds; candidates seeking their party's presidential nomination qualify for matching funds if they raise $5,000 in each of at least 20 states. His platform predicted financial disaster by 1980 accompanied by famine and the virtual extinction of the human race within 15 years, and proposed a debt moratorium; nationalization of banks; government investment in industry especially in the aerospace sector, and an "International Development Bank" to facilitate higher food production. When Legionnaires' disease appeared in the U.S. that year, he said it was a continuation of the swine flu outbreak, and that senators who opposed vaccination were suppressing the link as part of a "genocidal policy".

His campaign included a paid half-hour television address, which allowed him to air his views before a national audience, something that became a regular feature of his later campaigns. There were protests about this, and about the NCLC's involvement in public life generally. Writing in The Washington Post, Stephen Rosenfeld said LaRouche's ideas belonged to the radical right, neo-Nazi fringe, and that his main interests lay in disruption and disinformation; Rosenfeld called the NCLC one of the "chief polluters" of political democracy. Rosenfeld argued that the press should be "chary" of offering them print or airtime: "A duplicitous violence-prone group with fascistic proclivities should not be presented to the public, unless there is reason to present it in those terms." LaRouche wrote in 1999 that this comment had "openly declared ... a policy of malicious lying" against him.

==== 1977: Second marriage ====
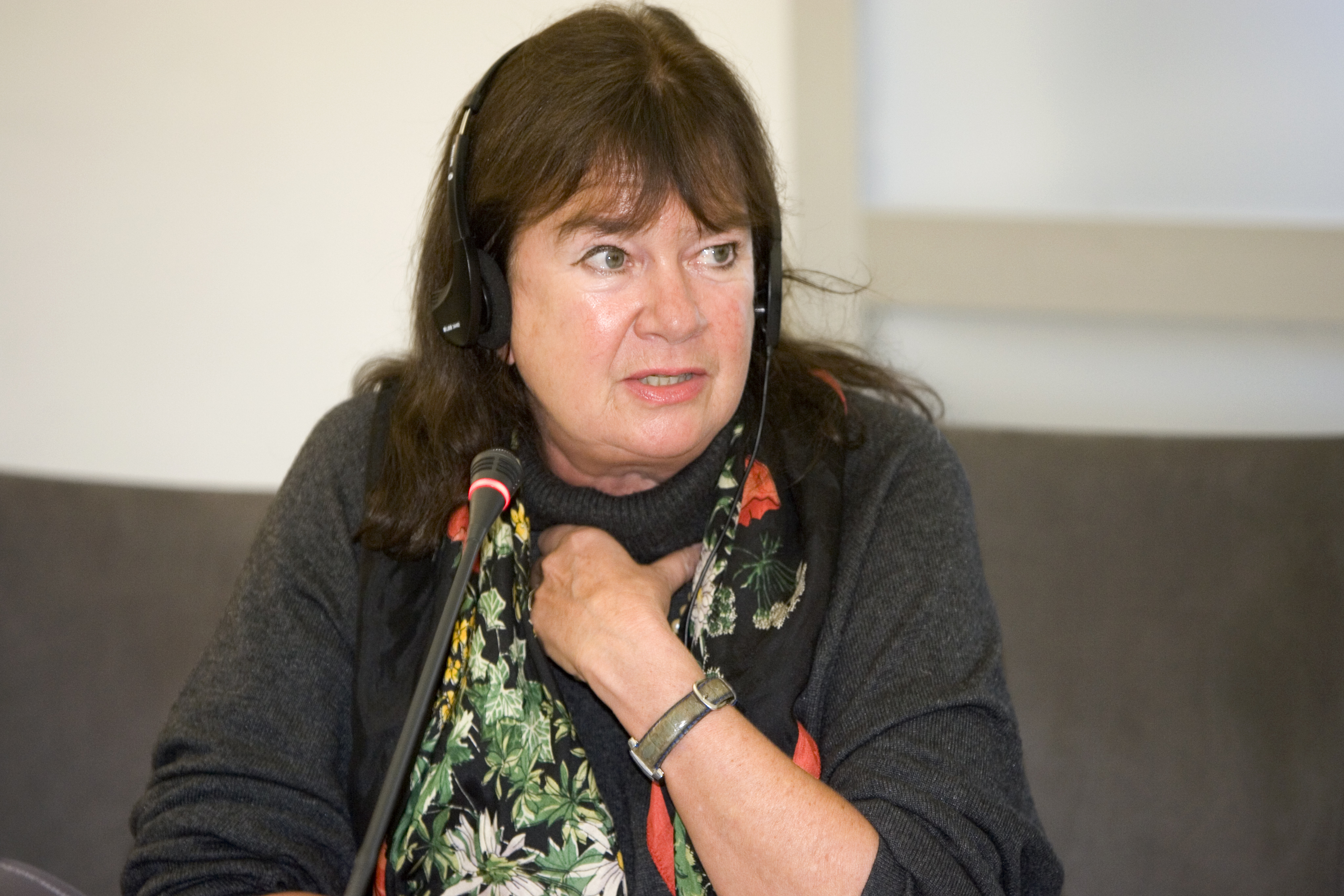
Helga Zepp in 2005

LaRouche married again in 1977. His wife, Helga Zepp, was then a leading activist in the West German branch of the movement. She went on to work closely with LaRouche for the rest of her career, standing for election in Germany in 1980 for his Europäische Arbeiterpartei (European Workers Party), and founding the Schiller Institute in Germany in 1984.

=== 1980s ===
==== National Democratic Policy Committee, "October Surprise" theory ====
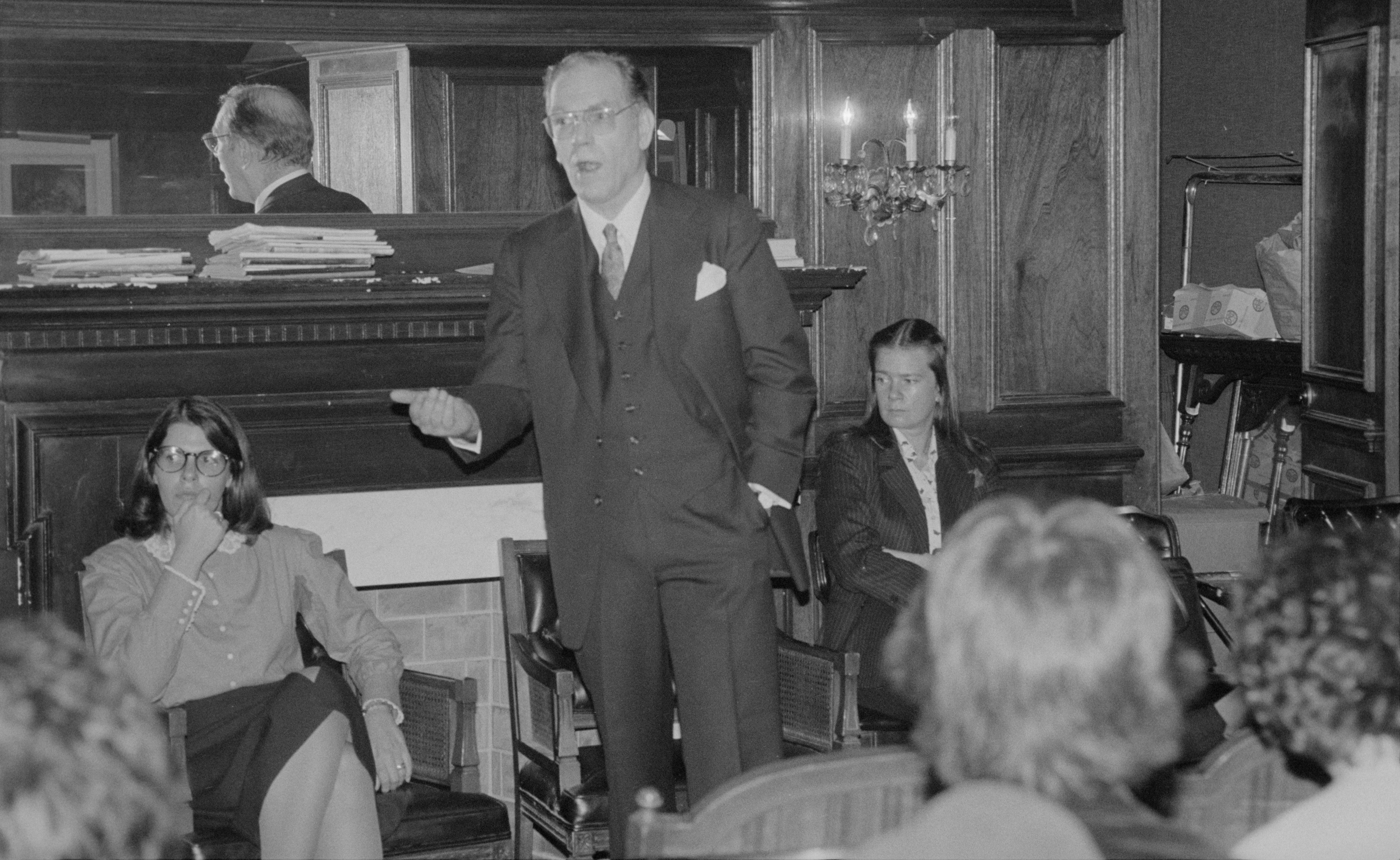
LaRouche speaking to a group of people in November 1979

From the third quarter of 1979, the LaRouche movement conducted most of its U.S. electoral activities as the National Democratic Policy Committee (NDPC), a political action committee. The name drew complaints from the Democratic Party's Democratic National Committee. Democratic Party leaders refused to recognize LaRouche as a party member, or to seat the few delegates he received in his seven primary campaigns as a Democrat. In its 2019 obituary of LaRouche, New York magazine reported that LaRouche's attempts to pose as a Democrat were originally an attempt at a spoiler operation to divide the opponents of Ronald Reagan.

LaRouche's campaign platforms advocated a return to the Bretton Woods system, including a gold-based national and world monetary system; fixed exchange rates; and abolishing the International Monetary Fund. He supported the replacement of the central bank system, including the U.S. Federal Reserve System, with a "national bank"; a war on drug trafficking and prosecution of banks involved in money laundering; building a tunnel under the Bering Strait; the building of nuclear power plants; and a crash program to build particle-beam weapons and lasers, including support for elements of the Strategic Defense Initiative (SDI). He opposed the Soviet Union and supported a military buildup to prepare for imminent war; supported the screening and quarantine of AIDS patients; and opposed environmentalism, deregulation, outcome-based education, and abortion:

No more will the United States fight World Wars to save the British Empire in any shape or guise. No more will the United States tolerate the British system, whether colonial or neo-colonial. No more will the United States tolerate the economics of Adam Smith in any part of the world. We are going to take this aching, poor, hungry world and we're going to transform it with American methods. We're going to transform it through the export and development of high technology, we're going to have Manhattan Projects and NASA projects and every dirigiste, Federally-directed, scientific crazed program that we deem necessary.

— Lyndon LaRouche, at the opening of the National Democratic Policy Committee, 1979

In December 1980, LaRouche and his followers started what came to be known as the "October Surprise" allegation, namely that in October 1980 Ronald Reagan's campaign staff conspired with the Iranian government during the Iran hostage crisis to delay the release of 52 American hostages held in Iran, with the aim of helping Reagan win the 1980 United States presidential election against Jimmy Carter. The Iranians had agreed to this, according to the theory, in exchange for future weapons sales from the Reagan administration. The first publication of the story was in LaRouche's Executive Intelligence Review on December 2, 1980, followed by his New Solidarity on September 2, 1983, alleging that Henry Kissinger, one of LaRouche's regular targets, had met Iran's Ayatollah Beheshti in Paris, according to Iranian sources in Paris. The theory was later echoed by former Iranian President Abolhassan Banisadr and former Naval intelligence officer and National Security Council member Gary Sick.

==== 1983: Move from New York to Loudoun County ====
The Washington Post wrote that LaRouche and his wife moved in August 1983 from New York to a 13-room Georgian mansion on a 250-acre section of the Woodburn Estate, near Leesburg, Loudoun County, Virginia. The property was owned at the time by a company registered in Switzerland. Companies associated with LaRouche continued to buy property in the area, including part of Leesburg's industrial park, purchased by LaRouche's Lafayette/Leesburg Ltd. Partnership to develop a printing plant and office complex.

Neighbors said they saw LaRouche guards in camouflage clothes carrying semi-automatic weapons, and the Post wrote that the house had sandbag-buttressed guard posts nearby, along with metal spikes in the driveway and concrete barriers on the road. One of his aides said LaRouche was safer in Loudoun County: "The terrorist organizations which have targeted Mr. LaRouche do not have bases of operations in Virginia." LaRouche said his new home meant a shorter commute to Washington. A former associate said the move also meant his members would be more isolated from friends and family than they had been in New York. According to the Post in 2004, local people who opposed him for any reason were accused in LaRouche publications of being communists, homosexuals, drug pushers, and terrorists. He reportedly accused the Leesburg Garden Club of being a nest of Soviet sympathizers, and a local lawyer who opposed LaRouche on a zoning matter went into hiding after threatening phone calls and a death threat. In leaflets supporting his application of concealed weapons permits for his bodyguards in Leesburg, Virginia, he wrote:

I have a major personal security problem ... [Without the permits] the assassination teams of professional mercenaries now being trained in Canada and along the Mexico border may be expected to start arriving on the streets of Leesburg ... If they come, there will be many people dead or mutilated within as short an interval as 60 seconds of fire.

Of LaRouche's paramilitary security force, armed with semi-automatic weapons, a spokesperson said that it was necessary because LaRouche was the subject of "assassination conspiracies".

==== 1984: Schiller Institute, television spots, contact with Reagan administration ====
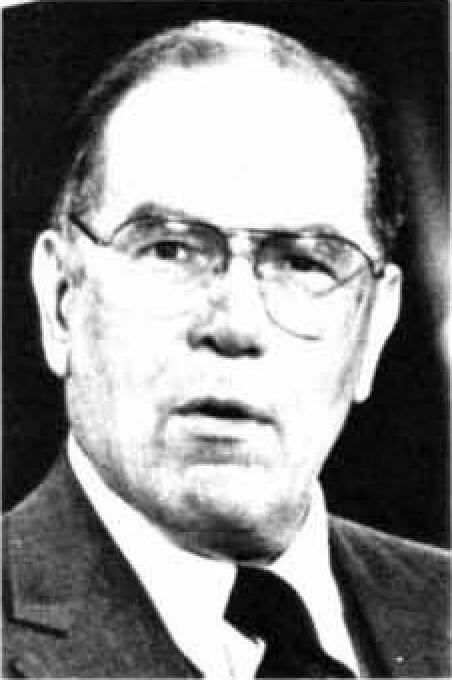
LaRouche during his 1984 presidential campaign

Helga Zepp-LaRouche founded the Schiller Institute in Germany in 1984. In the same year, LaRouche raised enough money to purchase 14 television spots, at $330,000 each, in which he called Walter Mondale—the Democratic Party's presidential nominee—a Soviet agent of influence, triggering over 1,000 telephone complaints. On April 19, 1986, NBC's Saturday Night Live aired a sketch satirizing the ads, portraying the Queen of the United Kingdom and Henry Kissinger as drug dealers. LaRouche received 78,773 votes in the 1984 presidential election.

In 1984, media reports stated that LaRouche and his aides had met some Reagan administration officials, including Norman Bailey, senior director of international economic affairs for the National Security Council (NSC), and Richard Morris, special assistant to William P. Clark, Jr. There were also reported contacts with the Drug Enforcement Administration, the Defense Intelligence Agency, and the CIA. The LaRouche campaign said the reporting was full of errors. In 1984 two Pentagon officials spoke at a LaRouche rally in Virginia; a Defense Department spokesman said the Pentagon viewed LaRouche's group as a "conservative group ... very supportive of the administration." White House spokesman Larry Speakes said the Administration was "glad to talk to" any American citizen who might have information. According to Bailey, the contacts were broken off when they became public. Three years later, LaRouche blamed his criminal indictment on the NSC, saying he had been in conflict with Oliver North over LaRouche's opposition to the Nicaraguan Contras. According to a LaRouche publication, a court-ordered search of North's files produced a May 1986 telex from Iran–Contra defendant General Richard Secord, discussing the gathering of information to be used against LaRouche. According to King, LaRouche's Executive Intelligence Review was the first to report important details of the Iran–Contra affair, predicting that a major scandal was about to break months before mainstream media picked up on the story.

==== Strategic Defense Initiative ====
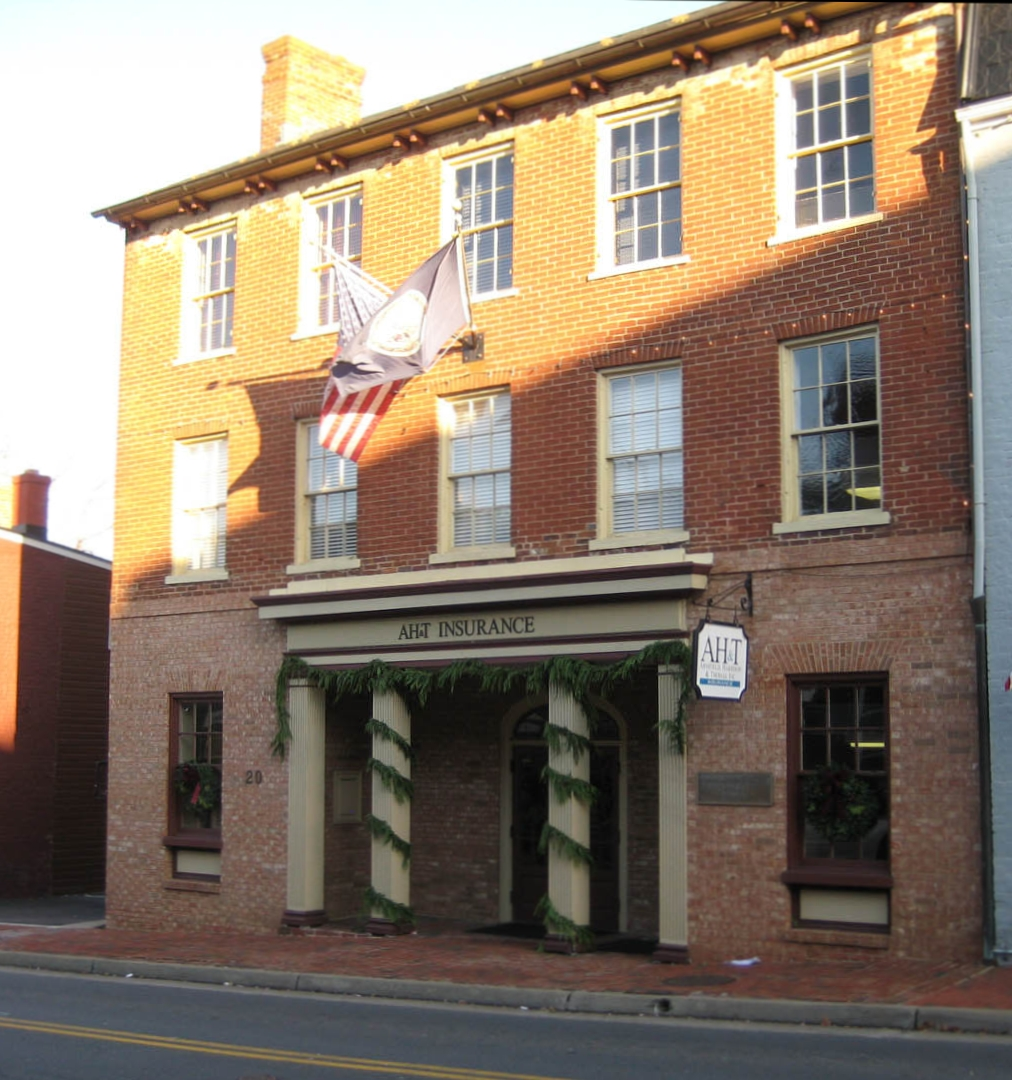
The Wheat Building in Leesburg, Virginia, which housed the Fusion Energy Foundation in the 1980s

The LaRouche campaign supported Reagan's Strategic Defense Initiative (SDI). Dennis King wrote that LaRouche had been speculating about space-based weaponry as early as 1975. He set up the Fusion Energy Foundation, which held conferences and tried to cultivate scientists, with some success. In 1979, FEF representatives attended a Moscow conference on laser fusion. LaRouche began to promote the use of lasers and related technologies for both military and civilian purposes, calling for a "revolution in machine tools."

According to King, LaRouche's associates had for some years been in contact with members of the Reagan administration about LaRouche's space-based weapons ideas. LaRouche proposed the development of defensive beam technologies as a policy that was in the interest of both the U.S. and the Soviet Union, as the alternative to an arms race in offensive weapons and as a generator of spin-off economic benefits. Between February 1982 and February 1983, with the NSC's approval, LaRouche met with Soviet embassy representative Evgeny Shershnev to discuss the proposal. During this period, Soviet economists also began to study LaRouche's economic forecasting model. But after Reagan's public announcement of the SDI in March 1983, Soviet representatives broke off contact with LaRouche and his representatives.

Physicist Edward Teller, a proponent of SDI and X-ray lasers, told reporters in 1984 that he had been courted by LaRouche but had kept his distance. LaRouche began calling his plan the "LaRouche-Teller proposal," though they had never met. Teller said LaRouche was "a poorly informed man with fantastic conceptions."

LaRouche later attributed the collapse of the Soviet Union to its refusal to follow his advice to accept Reagan's offer to share the technology. Former Secretary of Defense Donald Rumsfeld reported in his 2011 memoir that at a 2001 dinner in Russia with leading officials, he was told by General Yuri Baluyevsky, then the second highest-ranking officer in the Russian military, that LaRouche was the brains behind SDI. Rumsfeld said he believed LaRouche had had no influence on the program, and surmised that Baluyevsky must have obtained the information off the Internet. In 2012 the former head of the Russian bureau of Interpol, General Vladimir Ovchinsky, also described LaRouche as the man who proposed the SDI.

==== 1984: NBC lawsuit ====
In January 1984, NBC aired a news segment about LaRouche, and in March a "First Camera" report produced by Pat Lynch. The reports called LaRouche "the leader of a violence-prone, anti-Semitic cult that smeared its opponents and sued its critics", as Lynch wrote in 1985 in the Columbia Journalism Review. In interviews, former members of the movement gave details about their fundraising practices, and alleged that LaRouche had spoken about assassinating President Jimmy Carter. The reports said an investigation by the Internal Revenue Service would lead to an indictment, and quoted Irwin Suall, the Anti-Defamation League's fact-finding director, who called LaRouche a "small-time Hitler". After the broadcast, LaRouche members picketed NBC's office carrying signs saying "Lynch Pat Lynch," and the NBC switchboard said it received a death threat against her. Another NBC researcher said someone placed fliers around her parents' neighborhood saying she was running a call-girl ring from her parents' home. Lynch said LaRouche members began to impersonate her and her researchers in telephone calls, and called her "Fat Lynch" in their publications.

LaRouche filed a defamation suit against NBC and the ADL, arguing that the programs were the result of a deliberate campaign of defamation against him. The judge ruled that NBC need not reveal its sources, and LaRouche lost the case. NBC won a countersuit, the jury awarding the network $3 million in damages, later reduced to $258,459, for misuse of libel law, in what was called one of the more celebrated countersuits by a libel defendant. LaRouche failed to pay the damages, pleading poverty, which the judge described as "completely lacking in credibility." LaRouche said he had been unaware since 1973 who paid the rent on the estate, or for his food, lodging, clothing, transportation, bodyguards, and lawyers. The judge fined him for failing to answer. After the judge signed an order to allow discovery of LaRouche's personal finances, a cashier's check was delivered to the court to end the case. When LaRouche appealed, the Fourth Circuit Court of Appeals, rejecting his arguments, set forth a three-pronged test, later called the "LaRouche test," to decide when anonymous sources must be named in libel cases.

==== 1985–1986: PANIC, LaRouche's AIDS initiative ====
LaRouche interpreted the AIDS pandemic as fulfillment of his 1973 prediction that an epidemic would strike humanity in the 1980s. According to Christopher Toumey, his subsequent campaign followed a familiar LaRouche pattern: challenging the scientific competence of government experts, and arguing that LaRouche had special scientific insights, and his own scientific associates were more competent than government scientists. LaRouche's view of AIDS agreed with orthodox medicine in that HIV caused AIDS, but differed from it in arguing that HIV spread like the cold virus or malaria, by way of casual contact and insect bites – which, if true, would make HIV-positive people extremely dangerous. He advocated testing anyone working in schools, restaurants, or healthcare, and quarantining those who tested positive. Some of LaRouche's views on AIDS were developed by John Seale, a British venereological physician who proposed that AIDS was created in a Soviet laboratory. Seale's highly speculative writings were published in three prestigious medical journals, lending these ideas some appearance of being hard science.

LaRouche and his associates devised a "Biological Strategic Defense Initiative" that would cost $100 billion per annum, which they said would have to be directed by LaRouche. Toumey writes that those opposing the program, such as the World Health Organization and Centers for Disease Control, were accused of "viciously lying to the world," and of following an agenda of genocide and euthanasia. In 1986 LaRouche proposed that AIDS be added to California's List of Communicable Diseases. Sponsored by his "Prevent AIDS Now Initiative Committee" (PANIC), Proposition 64 – or the "LaRouche initiative" – qualified for the California ballot in 1986, with the required signature gatherers mostly paid for by LaRouche's Campaigner Publications. Seale, presented as an AIDS expert by PANIC, supported the LaRouche initiative, but disagreed with several of LaRouche's views, including that HIV could be spread by insects, and described the group's political beliefs and conspiracy theories as "rather odd". According to David Kirp, professor of public policy at the University of California at Berkeley, the proposal would have required that 300,000 people in the area with HIV or AIDS be reported to public health authorities; might have removed over 100,000 of them from their jobs in schools, restaurants and agriculture; and would have forced 47,000 children to stay away from school.

The proposal was opposed by leading scientists and local health officials as based on inaccurate scientific information and, as the public health schools put it, running "counter to all public health principles." It was defeated, reintroduced two years later, and defeated again, with two million votes in favor the first time, and 1.7 million the second. AIDS became a leading plank in LaRouche's platform during his 1988 presidential campaign.

==== 1986: Electoral success in Illinois; press conference allegations ====
In March 1986, Mark Fairchild and Janice Hart – LaRouche National Democratic Policy Committee candidates – unexpectedly won the Democratic primary for statewide offices in Illinois, gaining national attention for LaRouche. The Democratic gubernatorial candidate, Adlai Stevenson III, withdrew his nomination rather than run on the same slate as LaRouche members, and told reporters the party was "exploring every legal remedy to purge these bizarre and dangerous extremists from the Democratic ticket." A spokesman for the Democratic National Committee said it would have to do a better job of communicating to the electorate that LaRouche's National Democratic Policy Committee was unrelated to the Democratic Party. The New York Times wrote that Democratic Party officials were trying to identify LaRouche candidates in order to alert voters, and asked the LaRouche organization to release a full list of its candidates.

A month later, LaRouche held a press conference to accuse the Soviet government, British government, drug dealers, international bankers, and journalists of being involved in multiple conspiracies. Flanked by bodyguards, he said: "If Abe Lincoln were alive, he'd probably be standing up here with me today," and that there was no criticism of him that did not originate "with the drug lobby or the Soviet operation ..." He said he had been in danger from Soviet assassins for over 13 years, and had to live in safe houses. He refused to answer a question from an NBC reporter, saying "How can I talk with a drug pusher like you?" He called the leadership of the United States "idiotic" and "berserk," and its foreign policy "criminal or insane." He warned of the imminent collapse of the banking system and accused banks of laundering drug money. Asked about the movement's finances, he said "I don't know. ... I'm not responsible, I'm not involved in that."

==== 1986–1988: Raids and criminal convictions ====
In October 1986, hundreds of state and federal officers raided LaRouche offices in Virginia and Massachusetts. A federal grand jury indicted LaRouche and twelve of his associates on credit card fraud and obstruction of justice. The charges stated that they had attempted to defraud people of millions of dollars, including several elderly people, by borrowing money they did not intend to repay. LaRouche disputed the charges, alleging that they were politically motivated.

When LaRouche's "heavily fortified" estate was surrounded, he at first warned law-enforcement officials not to arrest him, saying that any attempt to do so would be an attempt to kill him. A spokesman would not rule out the use of violence against officials in response. While surrounded, LaRouche sent a telegram to president Ronald Reagan saying that an attempt to arrest him "would be an attempt to kill me. I will not submit passively to such an arrest, ... I will defend myself."

In 1987, a number of LaRouche entities, including the Fusion Energy Foundation, were taken over through an involuntary bankruptcy proceeding. The government's use of a sealed order in this proceeding was regarded as a rare legal maneuver.

On December 16, 1988, LaRouche was convicted of conspiracy to commit mail fraud involving more than $30 million in defaulted loans; eleven counts of actual mail fraud involving $294,000 in defaulted loans; and a single count of conspiring to defraud the U.S. Internal Revenue Service. He was sentenced to 15 years in federal prison, but was released on parole after serving five years on January 26, 1994.

Thirteen associates were sentenced to prison terms ranging from one month to 77 years for mail fraud and conspiracy.

The trial judge called LaRouche's claim of a political vendetta "arrant nonsense", and said "the idea that this organization is a sufficient threat to anything that would warrant the government bringing a prosecution to silence them just defies human experience."

Defense lawyers filed unsuccessful appeals that challenged the conduct of the grand jury, the contempt fines, the execution of the search warrants, and various trial procedures. At least ten appeals were heard by the United States Court of Appeals, and three were heard by the U.S. Supreme Court.

Former Attorney General Ramsey Clark joined the defense team for two appeals, writing that the case involved "a broader range of deliberate and systematic misconduct and abuse of power over a longer period of time in an effort to destroy a political movement and leader, than any other federal prosecution in my time or to my knowledge."

In his 1988 autobiography, LaRouche says the raid on his operation was the work of Raisa Gorbachev. In an interview that same year, he said that the Soviet Union opposed him, because he had invented the Strategic Defense Initiative. "The Soviet government hated me for it. Gorbachev also hated my guts and called for my assassination and imprisonment and so forth." He asserted that he had survived these threats, because he had been protected by unnamed U.S. government officials. "Even when they don't like me, they consider me a national asset, and they don't like to have their national assets killed."

LaRouche received 25,562 votes in the 1988 presidential election.

==== 1989: Musical interests and Verdi tuning initiative ====
LaRouche had an interest in classical music up to the period of Brahms. A motto of LaRouche's European Workers' Party is "Think like Beethoven"; movement offices typically include a piano and posters of German composers, and members are known for their choral singing at protest events and for using satirical lyrics tailored to their targets. LaRouche abhorred popular music; he said in 1980, "Rock was not an accidental thing. This was done by people who set out in a deliberate way to subvert the United States. It was done by British intelligence," and wrote that the Beatles were "a product shaped according to British Psychological Warfare Division specifications."

LaRouche movement members have protested at performances of Richard Wagner's operas, denouncing Wagner as an anti-Semite who found favor with the Nazis, and called a conductor "satanic" because he played contemporary music.

In 1989, LaRouche advocated that classical orchestras should use a concert pitch based on A above middle C (A_{4}) tuned to 432 Hz, which the Schiller Institute called the "Verdi pitch", a pitch that Verdi had suggested as optimal, though he also composed and conducted in other pitches such as the French official diapason normal of 435 Hz, including his Requiem in 1874.

The Schiller Institute initiative attracted support from more than 300 opera stars, including Joan Sutherland, Plácido Domingo, and Luciano Pavarotti, who according to Opera Fanatic may not have been aware of LaRouche's politics. A spokesman for Domingo said Domingo had simply signed a questionnaire, had not been aware of its origins, and would not agree with LaRouche's politics. Renata Tebaldi and Piero Cappuccilli, who were running for the European Parliament on LaRouche's "Patriots for Italy" platform, attended Schiller Institute conferences as featured speakers. The discussions led to debates in the Italian parliament about reinstating "Verdi" legislation. LaRouche gave an interview to National Public Radio on the initiative from prison. The initiative was opposed by the editor of Opera Fanatic, Stefan Zucker, who objected to the establishment of a "pitch police," and argued that LaRouche was using the issue to gain credibility.

=== 1990s ===
==== Imprisonment, release on parole, attempts at exoneration, visits to Russia ====
LaRouche began his sentence in 1989, serving it at the Federal Medical Center in Rochester, Minnesota. From there he ran for Congress in 1990, seeking to represent the 10th District of Virginia, but he received less than one percent of the vote. He ran for president again in 1992 with James Bevel as his running mate, a civil rights activist who had represented the LaRouche movement in its pursuit of the Franklin child prostitution ring allegations. It was only the second-ever campaign for president from prison. He received 26,334 votes, standing again as the "Economic Recovery" party. For a time he shared a cell with televangelist Jim Bakker. Bakker later wrote of his astonishment at LaRouche's detailed knowledge of the Bible. According to Bakker, LaRouche received a daily intelligence report by mail, and at times had information about news events days before they happened. Bakker also wrote that LaRouche believed their cell was bugged. In Bakker's view, "to say LaRouche was a little paranoid would be like saying that the Titanic had a little leak."

Viktor Kuzin, a member of the Moscow City Council and a founder of the Democratic Union in Russia, travelled to Minnesota in 1993 to meet LaRouche in prison, and afterwards participated in international campaigns to exonerate LaRouche. An advertisement calling for exoneration was published in several U.S. newspapers, signed by Kuzin, Civil Rights attorney J. L. Chestnut, former Ugandan president Godfrey Binaisa, and others. Chestnut was interviewed in the Tuscaloosa News saying that when he met LaRouche, "I told him that he might as well be black and in Alabama."

The exoneration campaigns garnered the support of a number of State Representatives and State Senators in the U.S., as well as a former justice of the Washington State Supreme Court.

LaRouche was released on parole in January 1994, and returned to Loudoun County. The Washington Post wrote that he would be supervised by parole and probation officers until January 2004. Also in 1994, his followers joined members of the Nation of Islam to blame the Anti-Defamation League for what they alleged were crimes and conspiracies against African Americans, reportedly one of several such meetings since 1992.

Former U.S. Attorney General Ramsey Clark wrote a letter in 1995 to then-Attorney General Janet Reno in which he said that the case against LaRouche involved "a broader range of deliberate and systematic misconduct and abuse of power over a longer period of time in an effort to destroy a political movement and leader, than any other federal prosecution in my time or to my knowledge". He asserted that, "The government, ex parte, sought and received an order effectively closing the doors of these publishing businesses, all of which were involved in First Amendment activities, effectively preventing the further repayment of their debts." He called the convictions "a tragic miscarriage of justice which at this time can only be corrected by an objective review and courageous action by the Department of Justice". The LaRouche movement organized two panels to review the cases: the Curtis Clark Commission, and the Mann-Chestnut hearings.

Beginning in 1994, LaRouche made numerous visits to Russia, participating in conferences of the Vernadsky State Geological Museum of the Russian Academy of Sciences (RAS), the RAS Institute of the Far East, and other places. He addressed seminars at the RAS Institute of Economics, the RAS Institute of Oriental Studies. He spoke at hearings in the State Duma of the Russian Federation on measures to ensure the development of the Russian economy at the point of destabilization of the world financial system. Two of his books were translated into Russian.

On September 18, 1996, a full-page advertisement appeared in the New Federalist, a LaRouche publication, as well as The Washington Post and Roll Call. Entitled "Officials Call for LaRouche's Exoneration", its signatories included Arturo Frondizi, former president of Argentina; figures from the 1960s American civil rights movement such as Rosa Parks, Amelia Boynton Robinson (a leader of the Larouche-affiliated Schiller Institute), and James Bevel (a Larouche movement participant); former Minnesota Senator and Democratic presidential candidate Eugene McCarthy; Mervyn Dymally, who chaired the Congressional Black Caucus; and artists such as classical vocalist William Warfield and violinist Norbert Brainin, former 1st Violin of the Amadeus Quartet.

In 1996, LaRouche was invited to speak at a convention organized by the Nation of Islam's Louis Farrakhan and Ben Chavis, then of the National African American Leadership Summit. As soon as he began speaking, he was booed off the stage.

In the 1996 Democratic Party presidential primaries, he received enough votes in Louisiana and Virginia to get one delegate from each state, but before the primaries began, the Democratic National Committee chair, Donald Fowler, ruled that LaRouche was not a "bona fide Democrat" because of his "expressed political beliefs ... which are explicitly racist and anti-Semitic," and because of his "past activities, including exploitation of and defrauding contributors and voters." Fowler instructed state parties to disregard votes for LaRouche.

LaRouche opposed attempts to impeach President Bill Clinton, charging it was a plot by the British Intelligence to destabilize the U.S. government. In 1996 he called for the impeachment of Pennsylvania governor Tom Ridge.

Efforts to clear LaRouche's name continued, including in Australia, where the Parliament acknowledged receipt of 1,606 petition signatures in 1998.

In 1999, China's press agency, the Xinhua News Agency, reported that LaRouche had criticized the Cox Report, a congressional investigation that accused the Chinese of stealing U.S. nuclear weapons secrets, calling it a "scientifically illiterate hoax." On October 13, 1999, during a press conference to announce his plans to run for president, he predicted the collapse of the world's financial system, saying, "There's nothing like it in this century. ... it is systematic and therefore inevitable." He said the U.S. and other nations had built the "biggest financial bubble in all history," which was close to bankruptcy.

=== 2000s ===
==== 2000–2003: Worldwide LaRouche Youth Movement, September 11 attacks, presidential run ====
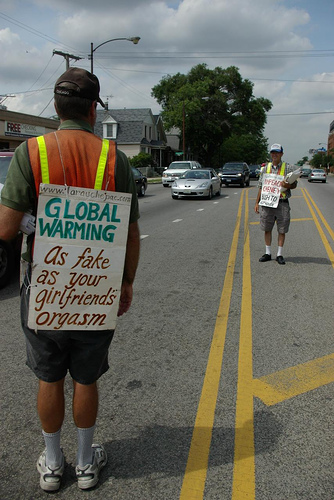
LaRouche supporters in Chicago, 2007

LaRouche founded the Worldwide LaRouche Youth Movement (WLYM) in 2000, saying in 2004 that it had hundreds of members in the U.S. and a lesser number overseas. During the Democratic primaries in June 2000, he received 53,280 votes, or 22% of the total, in Arkansas. Despite finishing above the 15% threshold needed to obtain delegates, LaRouche was denied any delegates and was barred from attending the 2000 Democratic National Convention.

In 2002, LaRouche's Executive Intelligence Review argued that the September 11 attacks in 2001 had been an "inside job" and "attempted coup d'etat", and that Iran was the first country to question it. The article received wide coverage in Iran, and was cited by senior Iranian government officials, including Akbar Hashemi Rafsanjani and Hassan Rouhani. Mahmoud Alinejad wrote that, in a subsequent telephone interview with the Voice of the Islamic Republic of Iran, LaRouche said the attacks had been organized by rogue elements inside the U.S., aiming to use the incident to promote a war against Islam, and that Israel was a dictatorial regime prepared to commit Nazi-style crimes against the Palestinians.

In 2003, LaRouche was living in a "heavily guarded" rented house in Round Hill, Loudoun County, Virginia.

LaRouche again entered the primary elections for the Democratic Party's nomination in 2004, setting a record for the number of consecutive presidential campaigns; Democratic Party officials did not allow him to participate in candidate forum debates. He did not run in 2008.

As during the preceding decade, LaRouche and his followers denied that human civilization had harmed the environment through DDT, chlorofluorocarbons, or carbon dioxide. According to Chip Berlet, "Pro-LaRouche publications have been at the forefront of denying the reality of global warming".

==== 2003–2012: Overseas press coverage, financial crisis ====
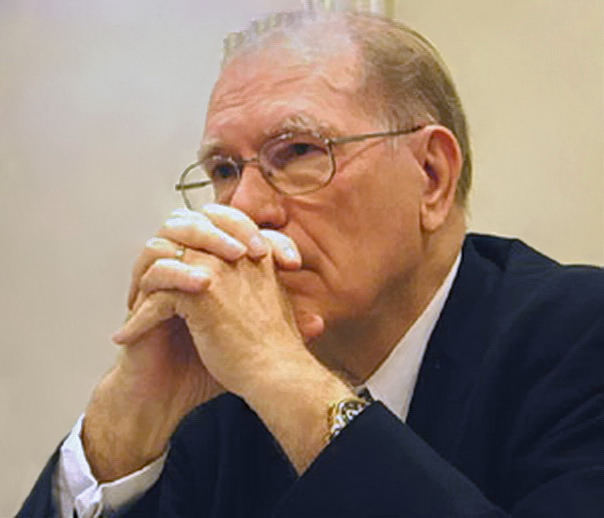
LaRouche circa 2006

Iqbal Qazwini wrote in the Arabic-language daily Asharq Al-Awsat in 2003 that LaRouche was one of the first to predict the fall of the Berlin Wall in 1988 and German reunification. He said LaRouche had urged the West to pursue a policy of economic cooperation similar to the Marshall Plan for the advancement of the economy of the socialist countries. According to Qazwini, recent years have seen a proliferation of LaRouche's ideas in China and South Asia. Qazwini referred to him as the spiritual father of the revival of the new Silk Road or Eurasian Landbridge, which aims to link the continents through a network of ground transportation.

In 2005, the People's Daily of China covered LaRouche's economic forecasts and published an eight-part interview with him; the interviewer wrote that LaRouche was "quite famous in mainland China today".

In 2007, LaRouche began a national lobbying campaign to restore the Glass-Steagall Act, saying that it would be possible to save the U.S. banking system by reorganizing it under bankruptcy protection. Also in 2007, he proposed a "Homeowners and Bank Protection Act". This called for the establishment of a federal agency that would "place federal- and state-chartered banks under protection, freeze all existing home mortgages for a period of time, adjust mortgage values to fair prices, restructure existing mortgages at appropriate interest rates, and write off speculative debt obligations of mortgage-backed securities". The bill envisioned a foreclosure moratorium, allowing homeowners to make the equivalent of rental payments for an interim period, and an end to bank bailouts, forcing banks to reorganize under bankruptcy laws. In spring 2007 he was an honorary foreign guest at a ceremony in honor of the 80th birthday of Stanislav Menshikov at the Russian Academy of Sciences.

==== 2009: U.S. health care reform ====
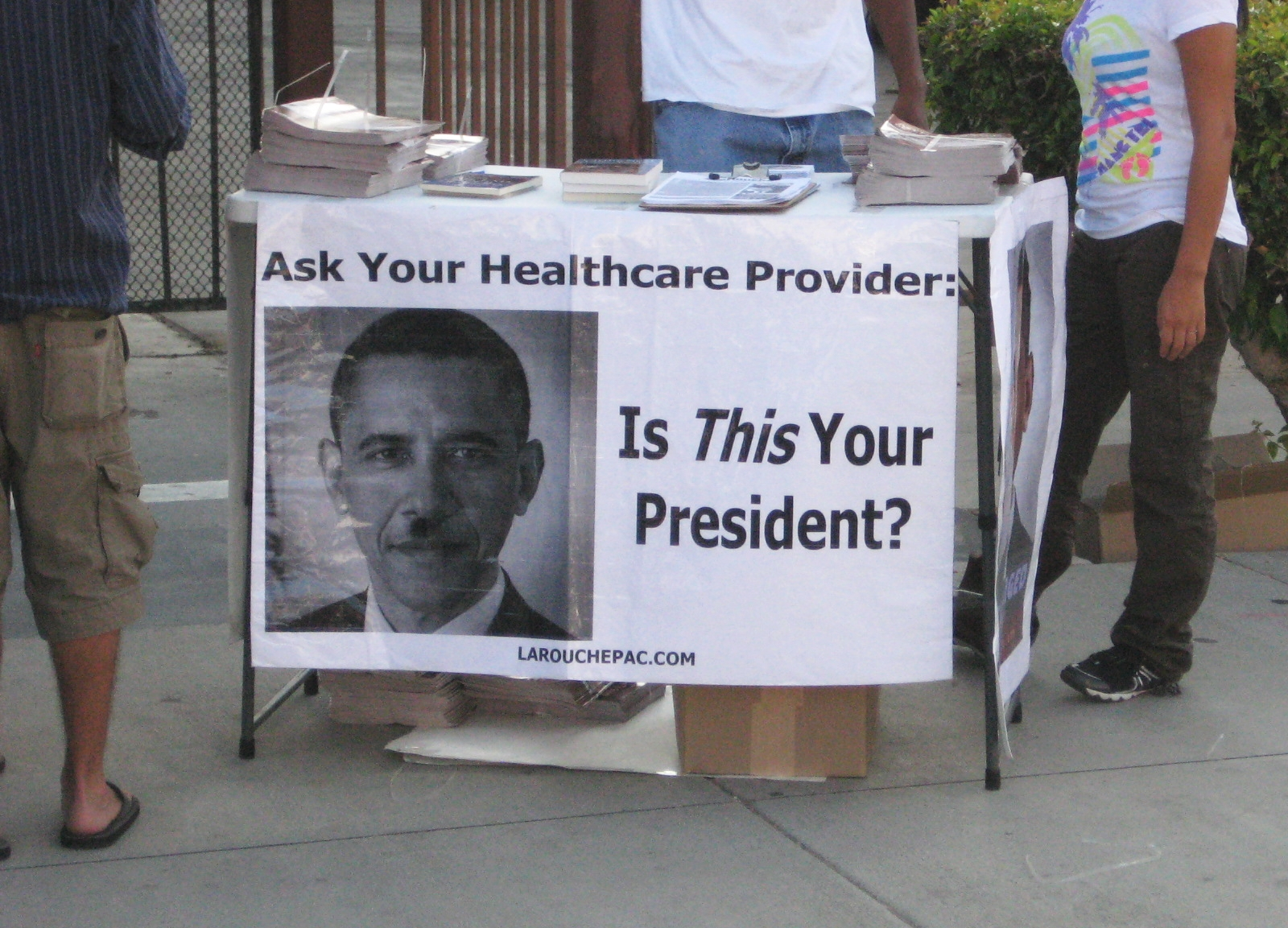
LaRouche poster of Barack Obama with a 'Hitler mustache'

During the discussion of U.S. health care reform in 2009, LaRouche advocated a single-payer health care bill and took exception to what he described as President Barack Obama's proposal that "independent boards of doctors and health care experts [should] make the life-and-death decisions of what care to provide, and what not, based on cost-effectiveness criteria." LaRouche said the proposed boards would amount to the same thing as the Nazis' Action T4 euthanasia program. A press release from his political action committee asserted: "Lyndon LaRouche and the LaRouchePAC are the source of the campaign to expose the Obama 'health care' policy as modeled on that of Hitler in 1939."

Images at tables of volunteers compared Obama to Adolf Hitler, and at least one had a picture of Obama with a Hitler-style mustache. In Seattle, police were called twice in response to people threatening to attack the volunteers. During one widely reported public meeting, Congressman Barney Frank called the images "vile, contemptible nonsense."

== Ideology and beliefs ==
University of Notre Dame political philosophers Catherine Zuckert and Michael Zuckert write of LaRouche that "[I]t must be nearly unique in American politics that a presidential candidate ... makes the interpretation of Plato a major issue in his campaign."

According to George Johnson, LaRouche saw history as a battle between Platonists, who believe in absolute truth, and Aristotelians, who rely on empirical data. Johnson characterizes LaRouche's views as follows: the Platonists include figures such as Beethoven, Mozart, Shakespeare, Leonardo da Vinci, and Leibniz. LaRouche believed that many of the world's ills result from the dominance of Aristotelianism as embraced by the empirical philosophers (such as Hobbes, Locke, Berkeley, and Hume), leading to a culture that favors the empirical over the metaphysical, embraces moral relativism, and seeks to keep the general population uninformed. Industry, technology, and classical music should be used to enlighten the world, LaRouche argued, whereas the Aristotelians use psychotherapy, drugs, rock music, jazz, environmentalism, and quantum theory to bring about a new Dark Age in which the world will be ruled by oligarchs. Left and right are false distinctions for LaRouche; what matters is the Platonic versus Aristotelian outlook, a position that has led him to form relationships with groups as disparate as farmers, nuclear engineers, Black Muslims, Teamsters, and anti-abortion advocates.

In Architects of Fear (1983), Johnson compares LaRouche's view to an Illuminati conspiracy theory; Johnson writes that after he wrote about LaRouche in The Minneapolis Star, LaRouche's followers denounced him as part of a conspiracy of elitists that began in ancient Egypt. But according to LaRouche, Aristotelians are not necessarily in communication or coordination with one another: "From their standpoint, [they] are proceeding by instinct," LaRouche said. "If you're asking how their policy is developed – if there is an inside group sitting down and making plans – no, it doesn't work that way ... History doesn't function quite that consciously."

In 2011, Stephen E. Adkins's Encyclopedia of Right-Wing Extremism In Modern American History called LaRouche "the leading neo-fascist politician in the United States".

== Controversy ==
LaRouche was described as having "fascistic tendencies", taking positions on the far right (despite his self-identification with the left and some left-wing policies), and creating disinformation.

=== Designation as a conspiracy theorist ===
LaRouche was commonly regarded as a conspiracy theorist: for example, in his Fox News obituary. An article in the Southern Poverty Law Center website names him as "a fringe ideologue and conspiracy theorist whom Chip Berlet, senior analyst at Political Research Associates and an expert on the radical right calls "the man who brought us fascism wrapped in an American flag". An NPR obituary is titled Conspiracy Theorist And Frequent Presidential Candidate Lyndon LaRouche Dies At 96. The Washington Post obituary reports he was "often described as an extremist crank and fringe figure" and that he "built a worldwide following based on conspiracy theories, economic doom, anti-Semitism, homophobia and racism".

=== Allegations of antisemitism ===
Beginning in the mid-1970s, allegations began to appear saying that LaRouche had fascist and antisemitic tendencies.

In 1977, LaRouche married his second wife, Helga Zepp-LaRouche, a German. Her 1984 book, The Hitler Book, argues that "We need a movement that can finally free Germany from the control of the Versailles and Yalta treaties, thanks to which we have staggered from one catastrophe to another for an entire century." Helga founded the Schiller Institute, which has been described as promoting antisemitic conspiracy theories by the Berliner Zeitung and Political Research Associates, a nonprofit research group that studies right-wing, white supremacist, and militia groups.

LaRouche said he was anti-Zionist, not antisemitic. When the Anti-Defamation League (ADL) accused LaRouche of antisemitism in 1979, he filed a $26-million libel suit; the case failed when Justice Michael Dontzin of the New York Supreme Court ruled that it was fair comment and that the facts "reasonably give rise" to that description. LaRouche started a campaign against the ADL and set up a group called "The Provisional Committee to Clean Up B'nai Brith".

LaRouche said in 1986 that descriptions of him as a neo-fascist or anti-Semite stemmed from "the drug lobby or the Soviet operation – which is sometimes the same thing"; in 2006, he wrote that "religious and racial hatred, such as antisemitism, or hatred against Islam, or, hatred of Christians, is, on record of known history, the most evil expression of criminality to be seen on the planet today." Antony Lerman wrote in 1988 that LaRouche used "the British" as a code word for "Jews", a theory also propounded by Dennis King, author of Lyndon LaRouche and the New American Fascism (1989). George Johnson argued that King's presentation failed to take into account that several members of LaRouche's inner circle were Jewish. Daniel Pipes wrote in 1997 that LaRouche's references to the British really were to the British, though he agreed that an alleged British–Jewish alliance lay at the heart of LaRouche's conspiracism.

As of 2016, the Jewish Virtual Library states that "The international organization run by Lyndon LaRouche is a major source of such masked antisemitic theories globally. In the U.S. the LaRouchites spread these conspiracy theories in an alliance with aides to Minister Louis Farrakhan of the Nation of Islam. A series of LaRouchite pamphlets calls the neoconservative movement the 'Children of Satan', which links Jewish neo-conservatives to the historic rhetoric of the blood libel."

=== Allegations of racism ===
Manning Marable of Columbia University wrote in 1998 that LaRouche tried in the mid-1980s to build bridges to the black community. Marable argued that most of the community was not fooled and quoted the A. Philip Randolph Institute, an organization for African American trade unionists, declaring that "LaRouche appeals to fear, hatred and ignorance. He seeks to exploit and exacerbate the anxieties and frustrations of Americans by offering an array of scapegoats and enemies: Jews, Zionists, international bankers, blacks, labor unions – much the way Hitler did in Germany." During LaRouche's slander suit against NBC in 1984, Roy Innis, leader of the Congress of Racial Equality, took the stand for LaRouche as a character witness, stating under oath that LaRouche's views on racism were "consistent with his own." Asked whether he had seen any indication of racism in LaRouche's associates, he replied that he had not.

=== Disputed record as economist and forecaster ===
LaRouche material frequently acclaims him as the world's greatest economist and the world's most successful forecaster— for example, in his book titled The Economics of the Noösphere: Why Lyndon LaRouche Is the World's Most Successful Economic Forecaster of the Past Four Decades. However, a website of ex-movement leaders lists incorrect predictions of sudden world economic collapse, war or depression in 1956, 1961–1970, 1972, 1975–1992, and 1994–2011.

Apart from the numerous failed predictions are claimed some successful predictions or proposals: the eventual reunification of Germany, the Star Wars initiative, the New Silk Road (claimed as a precursor to the Chinese One Belt One Road initiative.)

== Movement ==
Estimates of the size of LaRouche's movement have varied over the years; most say there is a core membership of 500 to 2,000. The estimated 600 members in 1978 paid monthly dues of $24. Johnson wrote in 1983 that both the Fusion Energy Foundation and the National Democratic Policy Committee had attracted some 20,000 members, as well as 300,000 magazine subscribers.

According to Christopher Toumey, LaRouche's charismatic authority within the movement was grounded on members' belief that he possessed a unique level of insight and expertise. He identified an emotionally charged issue, conducted in-depth research into it, and then proposed a simplistic solution, which usually involved restructuring of the economy or national security apparatus. He and the membership portrayed anyone opposing him as immoral and part of the conspiracy.

=== Description as a cult ===
The LaRouche movement has been described as a cult or cult-like by critics and anti-cult organizations.

A 1987 article by John Mintz in The Washington Post reported that members of the LaRouche movement lived hand-to-mouth in crowded apartments, with their basic needs paid for by the movement. They worked raising money or selling newspapers for LaRouche, doing research for him, or singing in a group choir, spending almost every waking hour together.

The group is known for its caustic attacks on opponents and former members. It has justified what it calls "psywar techniques" as necessary to shake people up; Johnson in 1983 quoted a LaRouche associate: "We're not very nice, so we're hated. Why be nice? It's a cruel world. We're in a war and the human race is up for grabs". Charles Tate, a former LaRouche associate, told The Washington Post in 1987 that members see themselves as exempt from the ordinary laws of society: "They feel that the continued existence of the human race is totally dependent on what they do in the organization, that nobody would be here without LaRouche. They feel justified in a peculiar way doing anything whatsoever."

== Death ==
LaRouche's death was announced on the website of one of his organizations. He died on February 12, 2019, at age 96. Neither the place nor cause of his death was specified.

== Publications ==
- The Third Stage of Imperialism(as Lyn Marcus). New York: West Village Committee for Independent Political Action (1967).
- Mass Action, with Tony Papert. Ann Arbor, Michigan: SDS Regional Labor Committee (1968).
- The Philosophy of Socialist Education. New York: National Caucus of Labor Committees (1969).
- Centrism as a Social Phenomenon: How Not to Build a Revolutionary Party (as Lyn Marcus), with Uwe Henke von Parpart. New York: National Caucus of SDS Labor Committees (1970).
- Education, Science and Politics. New York: National Caucus of Labor Committees (1972).
- The Question of Stalinism Today. Archived October 24, 2022, at the Wayback Machine New York: Campaigner Publications (1975). The Campaigner, vol. 8, no. 9 (Nov. 1975).
- How the International Development Bank Will Work. Archived October 24, 2022, at the Wayback Machine New York: Campaigner Publications (1975).
- A Presidential Campaign White Paper on Agricultural Production. New York: New Solidarity International Press Service (1975).
- The Rothschilds, from Pitt to Rockefeller (1976). OCLC 4895071.
- Dialectical Economics An Introduction to Marxist Political Economy.New York: Heath (1975). ISBN 0669853089.
- The Case of Walter Lippmann: A Presidential Strategy.New York: Campaigner Publications (1977). ISBN 0918388066.
- How to Defeat Liberalism and William F. Buckley: 1980 Campaign Policy.New York: New Benjamin Franklin House (1979). ISBN 0933488033.
- The Power of Reason: A Kind of Autobiography.New York: New Benjamin Franklin House (1979). ISBN 0933488017.
- Will the Soviets Rule During the 1980s?New York: New Benjamin Franklin House (1979). ISBN 0933488025.
- Basic Economics for Conservative Democrats. New York: New Benjamin Franklin House (1980). ISBN 0933488041.
- What Every Conservative Should Know About Communism.New York: New Benjamin Franklin House (1980). ISBN 0933488068.
- Why Revival of "SALT" Won't Stop War.New York: New Benjamin Franklin House (1980). ISBN 0933488084.
- The Ugly Truth About Milton Friedman, with David P. Goldman. New York: New Benjamin Franklin House (1980). ISBN 0933488092.
- Operation Juárez: Mexico/Ibero-America Policy Study. New York: Executive Intelligence Review (1982).
- There Are No Limits to Growth. Archived June 16, 2022, at the Wayback Machine New York: New Benjamin Franklin House (1983). ISBN 0933488319.
- So, You Wish to Learn All About Economics? A Text on Elementary Mathematical Economics.New York: New Benjamin Franklin House (1984). ISBN 0943235138.
- Imperialism: The Final Stage of Bolshevism.New York: New Benjamin Franklin House (1984). ISBN 0933488335.
- The Power of Reason, 1988: An Autobiography. Washington, D.C.: Executive Intelligence Review (1987). ISBN 0943235006.
- In Defense of Common Sense. Washington, D.C.: Schiller Institute (1989). ISBN 0962109533.
- The Science of Christian Economy. Washington, D.C.: Schiller Institute (1991). ISBN 0962109568.
- Cold Fusion: A Challenge to U.S. Science Policy, with Paul Gallager. Washington, D.C.: Schiller Institute (1992). ISBN 0962109576.
- Now, Are You Ready to Learn About Economics? Washington, D.C.: EIR News Service (2000). ISBN 0943235189.
- The Economics of the Nöosphere. Washington, D.C.: EIR News Service (2001). ISBN 0943235200.
