= Gateshead Grammar School =

Former school in Gateshead, Tyne and Wear, England

Location
- Prince Consort Road; Low Fell, Gateshead, County Durham; England

Information
- Type: Grammar school
- Motto: Toil No Soil
- Established: 1883 (1945)
- Closed: 1967
- Local authority: County Borough of Gateshead
- Gender: Boys
- Age: 11 to 18
- Publication: The Apple Cart
- Alumni: Old Goats
- Website: http://www.gateshead-grammar.com

Gateshead Grammar School was a school in Gateshead, Tyne and Wear, England, that operated from 1883 to 1967.

== History ==
The private school Gateshead High School For Boys opened in 1883 at the junction of Durham Road and Prince Consort Road. It was purchased by Gateshead School Board in 1894 and became a coeducational "Higher Grade School" called Gateshead Secondary School. Publicly owned Higher Grade Schools were a new breed of school, similar to the privately owned Grammar Schools but putting much more emphasis on science and art.

It was renamed Gateshead Grammar School after World War II, still coeducational, but it became boys only in 1956. The school was on the former A1.

=== Comprehensive ===
It was rebuilt on the same site in 1963, and in 1968 it became Saltwell Senior High School - a coeducational comprehensive school which lasted until the 1990s when it was closed and mostly demolished, and the youngsters were transferred to Kingsmeadow Community Comprehensive School at Dunston.

=== Headmasters ===
Past headmasters included Mr. John Bidgood, Mr. W. Walton, Mr. G.L.R. Brown and Dr. Caffrey.

=== Teachers ===
Former teachers include:

- Prof John Tuck, Professor of Education from 1974 to 1976 at Newcastle University (taught English from 1936 to 1938)

== Traditions ==
Its motto "Toil No Soil" was unusually in English (not Latin, Greek or French) and was taken from a quote of the Greek Poet Hesiod in his poem Works and Days, Toil is no disgrace, it is idleness which is a disgrace. The motto is interpreted as Toil (is) No Soil (soil being a synonym of disgrace) Included in list of mottos

== Notable alumni ==
- Prof H. T. Dickinson (1939–2024), Richard Lodge Professor of British History at the University of Edinburgh, and President from 2002 to 2005 of the Historical Association
- Muriel Forbes CBE (1894–1991), chairman from 1960 to 1961 of Middlesex County Council
- Kathleen Gales (1927–1995), medical statistician
- Alex Glasgow, songwriter
- Alexander Harvey (1904–1987), Principal from 1946 to 1968 of the University of Wales Institute of Science and Technology (part of Cardiff University since 1988)
- Arthur Holmes (1890–1965), geologist, forerunner in dating the Earth by radiometric dating and also proposed mantle convection as the driving mechanism for plate tectonics
- John Morton, Chief Executive from 2005 to 2008 of the Engineering and Technology Board, and Professor of Engineering from 1986 to 1993 at Virginia Polytechnic Institute and State University
- Ken Norton (cricketer)
- Prof Bruce Pattison, Professor of Education from 1948 to 1976 at the Institute of Education
- Sir George Russell CBE, Chief Executive from 1982 to 1992 of British Alcan, chairman from 1988 to 1992 of the Independent Broadcasting Authority and from 1991 to 1996 of the Independent Television Commission, and now an ITV executive
- David Skinner, Chief Executive from 1992 to 1996 of the Co-operative Wholesale Society
- John Steel (drummer), with The Animals
- Dame Muriel Stewart, President from 1964 to 1965 of the National Union of Teachers
- Prof Alan Stuart, Professor of Geology from 1957 to 1959 at the University of Exeter
- Donald Tyerman CBE (1908–1981), editor from 1956 to 1965 of The Economist
- Sylvia Waugh, writer of children's books
- Peter Wilsher, journalist for The Sunday Times
- E. H. Young (1880–1949), novelist
