= John Leggott College =

The John Leggott Sixth Form College
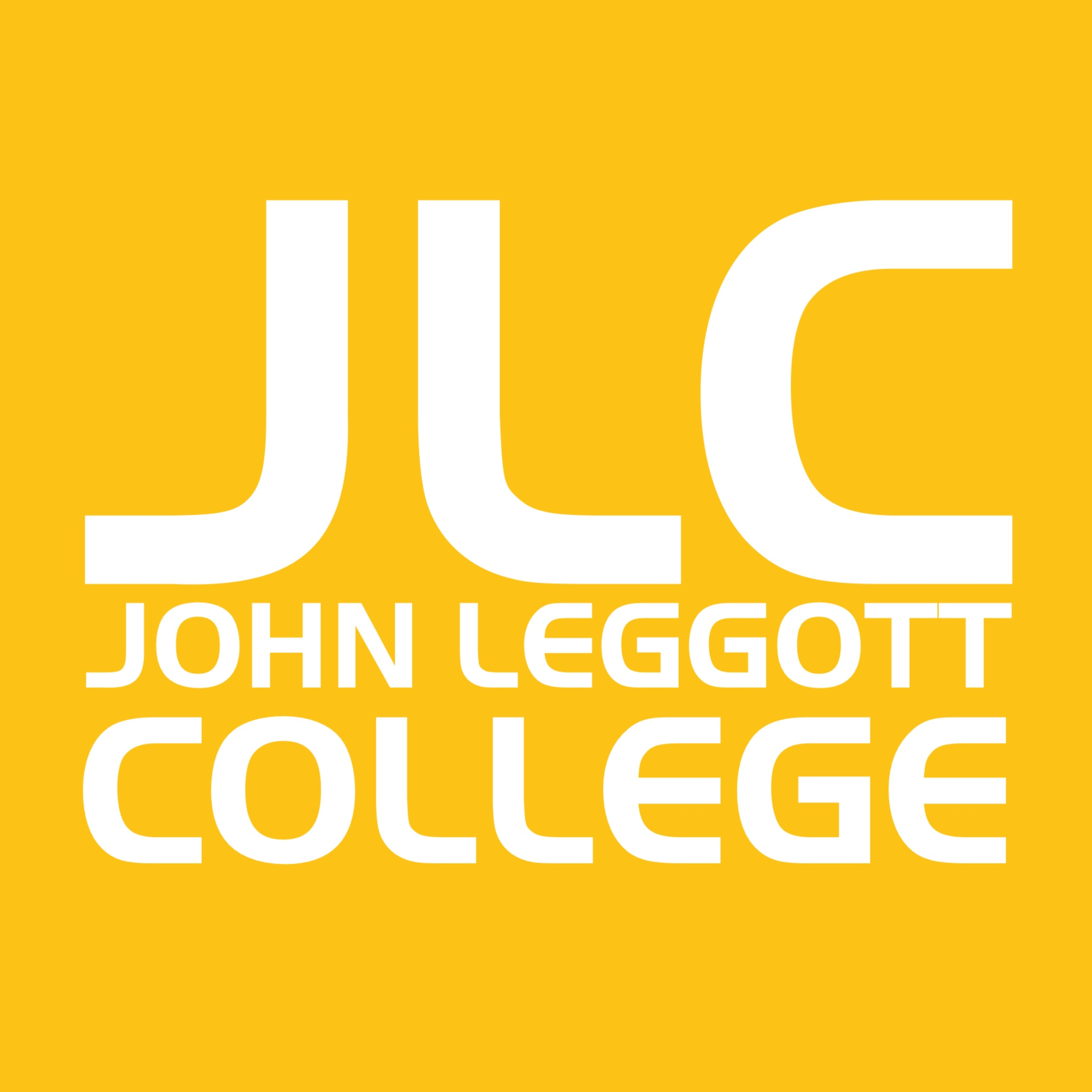

Location
- West Common Lane; Scunthorpe, Lincolnshire, DN17 1DS; England; 53.5745°N 0.66857°W

Information
- Type: Sixth form college
- Motto: Inspiring Education
- Established: 1968
- Local authority: North Lincolnshire
- Department for Education URN: 130588 Tables
- Ofsted: Reports
- Principal: Leon Riley
- Staff: 170
- Gender: Coeducational
- Age: 16+
- Enrolment: 5146
- Website: http://www.leggott.ac.uk

John Leggott College is a sixth form college on West Common Lane, in Old Brumby, Scunthorpe, North Lincolnshire, England.

== History ==
=== Technical school ===
Scunthorpe Central Technical School began around 1923. In the late 1930s, it was called the Scunthorpe Technical School.

In 1944, it became the Scunthorpe Technical High School on Cole Street, run by Lindsey County Council Education Committee, based in Lincoln, although its Scunthorpe Divisional Executive was based on Wells Street; this followed on from the Central School in Scunthorpe. There were 500 boys and girls, and the headmaster was John R. Leggott BSc. It had a sixth form, from 1948. The school focussed on technical skills which were of help to Scunthorpe's steel industry. Until the technical college opened in 1953, the technical high school provided most of the technical education in evening classes for the town. In 1957, for one year, the school became Scunthorpe Grammar Technical School.

John Leggott lived at 38 Glanville Avenue. He was president of the Scunthorpe Head Teachers' Association. He died suddenly, at home, on Friday 19 April 1957, aged 60, when he was the headmaster. In September 1957 it was decided to name the school after him. The new head was appointed in July 1957, aged 41. Some parents complained if their child was allocated to the John Leggott Grammar School, and not Scunthorpe Grammar School.

=== Grammar school ===
The college was founded in 1958 as John Leggott Grammar School with 600 pupils aged 11–18. German, Spanish and Russian were added by the early 1960s.

Plans from the new site of the grammar school were ready by August 1960, to start building in April 1961, and to open by 1963. In April 1961, it was decided to build, instead, a copy of the Frederick Gough School, to be able to open a year earlier, due to vastly less-original design work and bill of materials that would be required.

The building was to cost £250,000, with an octagonal hall and a swimming pool, but would be largely a copy of the Bottesford Grammar School (renamed the Frederick Gough Grammar School in 1960). Plans for comprehensive education in Scunthorpe were being discussed, and the original plan was for comprehensive education by 1965, with the three grammar schools being 11–19 schools, and the secondary modern schools being for ages 11–16. By December 1962, the cost would be £300,000. There would be 120 in the sixth form.

The new grammar school opened on Tuesday 10 September 1963. The next phase would open in June 1964, for a roll of 720, with six science laboratories, woodwork and metalwork rooms, and a housecraft room. The coat of arms featured Brumby Hall. The staircase and balustrading was made by Metalcraft of Stamford. The first headteacher was Eric Charlesworth. The grammar school catchment area was from the north-east of the borough, towards Winterton and beyond.

From 1963, the three grammar schools, in Scunthorpe, would develop their curriculum together, to elevate the standard of education across the town. But these common high standards would be largely diminished, if not forgotten about, once comprehensive education had taken over, exempting the sixth form college. The first school stage production at the new school was The Rivals in December 1964. A previous production had been in the Civic Theatre (Plowright Theatre).

=== Sixth form college ===
The sixth form college was established in September 1968 due to a reorganisation of education in Scunthorpe. It was the second sixth form college in the country, after Luton Sixth Form College in 1966.

It is commonly known as JLC and now has more than 1600 students. In 1971, there were 500 sixth formers, and by 1973, it was run by the Borough of Scunthorpe Education Committee, in April 1974 run by the Scunthorpe Division of Humberside Education Committee, and in April 1996 by North Lincolnshire.

John Render, aged 20, from Old Row, in Burton-on-Stather, died in the Flixborough disaster. He had played in the college football team.

On 30 November 2010 a number of students from the college participated in the nationwide 2010 UK student protests against the rise in university tuition fees. In 2010, John Leggott principal Nic Dakin retired from his role to represent the Scunthorpe constituency for the Labour Party. David Vasse succeeded him as principal in 2010, to be replaced in 2016 by new principal Leon Riley.

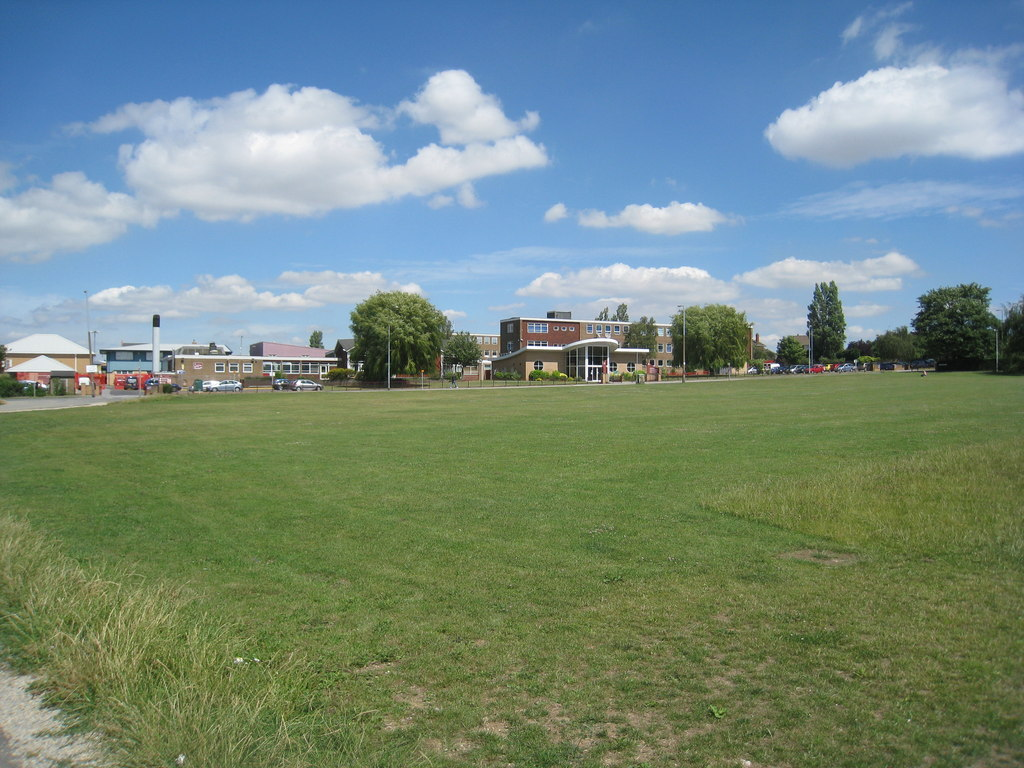
View of the college in July 2010

== Principals ==
- Eric Charlesworth lived in Scawby, died on 3 June 2013, aged 97
- Keith Constable from September 1978, taking over from the first head, having been vice-principal for five years, originally from Colchester, was a Physics teacher, who took part in Morris dancing; he left in December 1989
- 34 year old David Linnell, who studied economics at Leicester, took over in April 1990. He was formerly vice-principal of Colchester Sixth Form College

== Notable alumni ==
- Darren Bett, BBC weather forecaster
- Gina Bramhill, actress
- Gordon Dougan, biochemist
- Neil Priestley, cricketer
- Martin Simpson, folk singer, guitarist and songwriter
- Sheridan Smith OBE, actress
- Rachel de Souza, educationalist, social reformer and Children's Commissioner for England
- Matt Sparrow, footballer until 2010 for Scunthorpe United

=== Scunthorpe Technical High School ===
- Wallace L. W. Sargent, astronomer

== Former teachers ==
- Christina Baxter (1969–73), Head of Religious Education from 1973 to 1976
- Alexander Harvey (1904–1987), Principal of Scunthorpe Technical School from 1942 to 1946
- Richard Vergette, playwright
