= University of Wales Institute of Science and Technology =

- Welsh: Athrofa Gwyddoniaeth a Thechnoleg Prifysgol Cymru
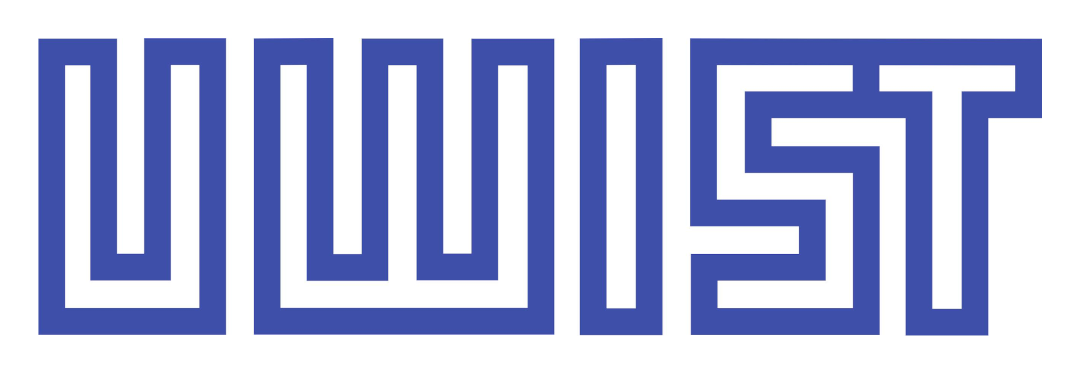
- Former names: Schools of Science and Art; Technical School of the County Borough of Cardiff; City of Cardiff Technical School; Cardiff Technical College; Cardiff College of Technology; Welsh College of Advanced Technology (1957–1968)
- Type: Public
- Active: 1866–1988
- Parent institution: University of Wales
- Principal: Sir Aubrey Trotman-Dickenson
- Location: Cardiff, Wales
- Colors: White and blue

The University of Wales Institute of Science and Technology (UWIST; Welsh: Athrofa Gwyddoniaeth a Thechnoleg Prifysgol Cymru) was a public university college based in the centre of the city of Cardiff, Wales. In 1988, it merged with the University College Cardiff, which later became Cardiff University.

UWIST joined the university sector in 1968 as a college of the University of Wales along with other colleges of advanced technology that became universities following the Robbins Report in 1963. These are sometimes grouped with the plate glass universities that were created at this time.

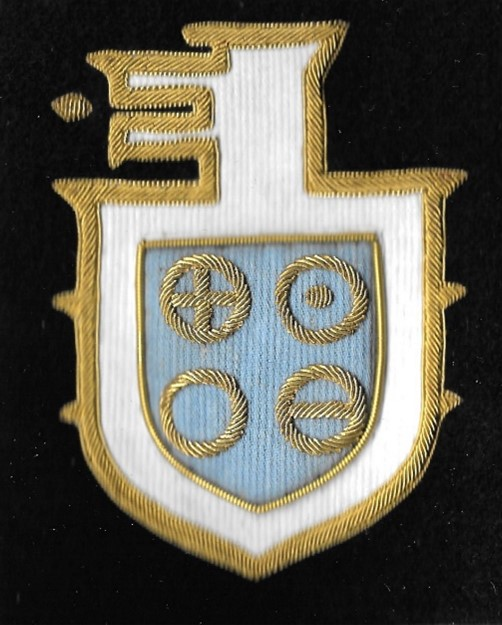
Institutional logo of the University of Wales Institute of Science and Technology, showing symbols for earth, air, fire and water

== History ==
=== Origins ===
The origins of UWIST begin with Schools of Science and Art which was established in 1866 by Cardiff Borough Council to run classes aimed at working people, classes took place at Cardiff Free Library. Between 1900 and 1907 the School was run by the University College of South Wales and Monmouthshire with Viriamu Jones acting as Principal of the Technical School. Control then reverted to Cardiff Borough Council and a new home Bute Building was opened in 1916 to house the City of Cardiff Technical School.

=== College of advanced technology ===
In 1956 following the publication of a government white paper on technical education, the UK government announced the creation of 10 colleges of advanced technology which would provide advanced work. The Cardiff College of Technology was converted to the Welsh College of Advanced Technology in 1957. Further structural changes occurred and on 1 April 1962 the college became an autonomous institution from the Cardiff Borough Council.

The college of advanced technology was granted a royal charter as the University of Wales Institute of Science and Technology on 13 November 1967, and became a constituent member of the University of Wales. The charter was presented by the Duke of Edinburgh, Chancellor of the University of Wales, to the Principal of UWIST at a special congregation of the university held on 19 April 1968.

=== Merger ===
Discussions on the merger of UWIST with University College Cardiff began in the early 1980s. A joint consultative committee chaired by Professor D.G.T. Williams was formed. The merger occurred in 1988 to form the University of Wales College of Cardiff.

== Governance ==
The CAT was governed by a Governing Body and Academic Board, this was replaced in 1968 with a Court, Council, and Senate following the traditional university model.

=== Chairman of CAT ===
- Dr W F Cartwright, nominated by the Department of Education

=== Presidents ===
- Sir Julian Hodge

=== Principals ===
- 1946 to 1966: Dr Alexander Harvey
- 1966 to 1988: Sir Aubrey Trotman-Dickenson

=== Registrar ===
- Mr F Harris-Jones

== Campus ==
The UWIST was based in the Bute Building and Redwood Building part of the Cathays Park complex in Cardiff, Wales.

Student accommodation was provided at Traherne and Heycock Halls and Roy Jenkins Hall amongst others.

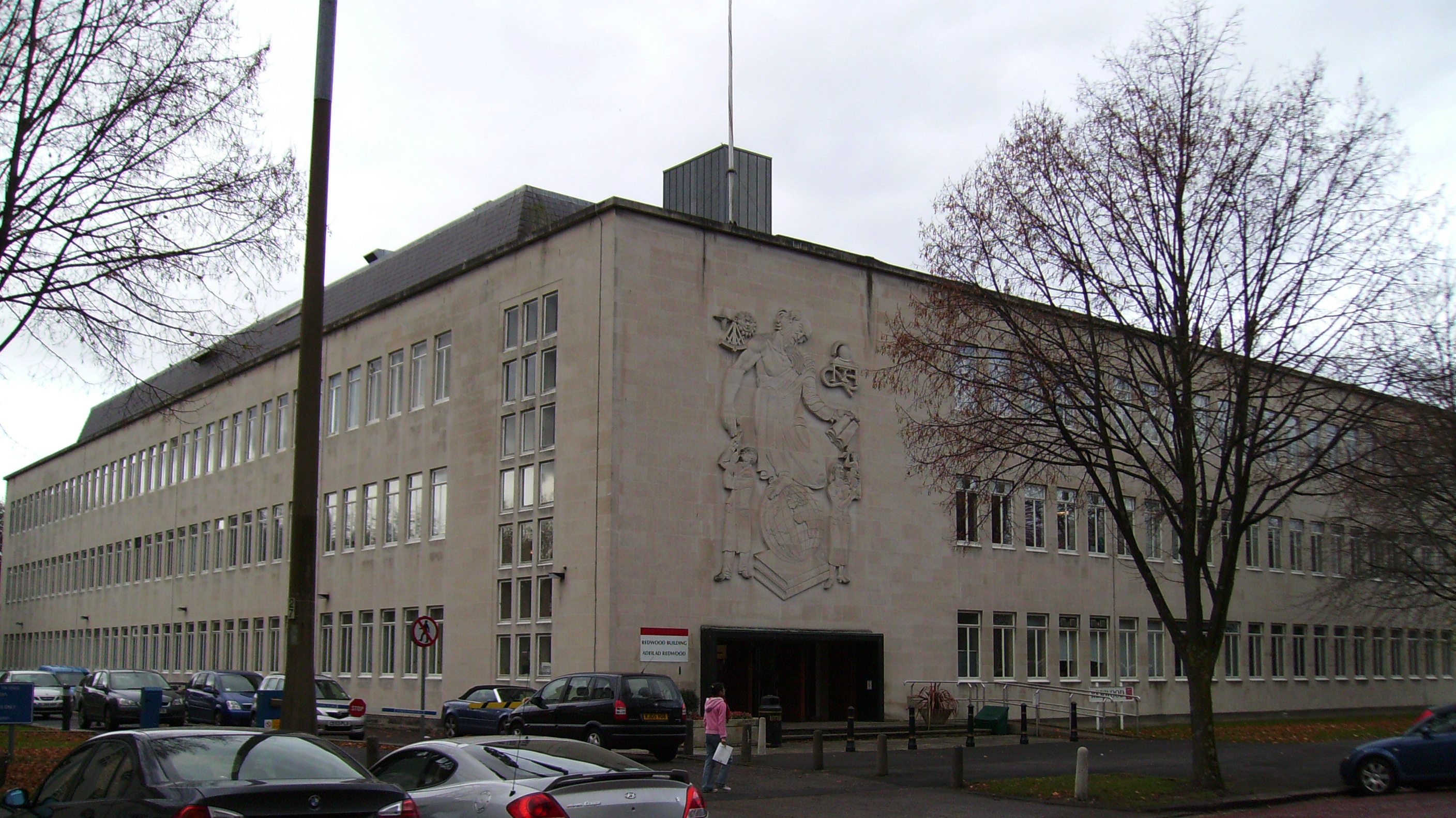

== Departments ==
- Physics

Applied Chemistry

- Electronics and Electrical Engineering
- Mathematics
- Optometry, est 1935
- School of Architecture
- Maritime Studies
- Law
- Applied Psychology
- Applied Pharmacology
- Town Planning
- Applied Biology
- Civil Engineering
- Applied Physics
- Mechanical Engineering and Engineering Production

Welsh School of Pharmacy

== Notable alumni and academics ==
=== Academics ===
- Sir Aubrey Trotman-Dickenson

=== Science ===
- Professor David R Williams
- Professor Emeritus John David Ronald Thomas
- Professor J.W. Griffiths
- Tom Parry Jones
