= John R. Seale =

British venereologist (1927–2020)

John R. Seale MRCP
- Born: John Richard Seale; 7 August 1927; Exeter, England
- Died: 19 April 2020 (aged 92); Devon, England
- Education: St John's College, Cambridge
- Known for: Theories about the origin of HIV
- Medical career
- Profession: Physician
- Sub-specialties: Venereology

John Richard Seale (7 August 1927 – 19 April 2020) was a British venereologist and advocate in the 1980s of the now-discredited theory that HIV which causes AIDS might have been created in a germ-warfare laboratory by gene-editing. His views and writings were subsequently used to back-up the claims of those that proposed a man-made origin for the virus, and in Soviet propaganda against the United States. A collection of papers relating to Seale's views on HIV are held by the Wellcome Collection.

== Early life and education ==
John Richard Seale was born in Exeter on 7 August 1927. He received his BA from St John's College, Cambridge, in 1948 and his MB BChir in 1951. He became a member of the Royal College of Physicians (MRCP) in 1953. Four years later he qualified with an MD.

== Career ==
Early in his career, Seale took an interest in health economics. He was Goodwin Travelling Fellow for St John's College at Harvard Graduate School of Business Administration and wrote on the relative spending on medicine in different countries, publishing on the matter in The Lancet in 1960 when he was senior medical registrar at St Mary's Hospital, London, and at the West Middlesex Hospital, Isleworth.

In 1966, he was appointed consultant venereologist at St Thomas' Hospital in London. He later worked at the Lister Hospital.

Seale was a fellow of the Royal Society of Medicine.

=== Anti-NHS activism ===
In the late 1950s, Seale became a member of the Fellowship for Freedom in Medicine (FFM), a conservative organisation that resisted the state control of medicine in Britain through the National Health Service (NHS). He was elected to the Fellowship's executive in 1962. His writings in support of the FFM's perspective included an article on "The Supply of Doctors" in the British Medical Journal in 1961 and another in 1964 in that journal on the rate of medical emigration from Britain and Ireland. He identified migration of British doctors to countries such as Canada due to poor employment conditions in the NHS and migration to Britain of doctors from Asia whose training and English language skills he questioned, adding a racial component to the class-based and economic opposition of some British doctors to the imposition of the NHS system on them by the British government. Much of the migration from Britain was of general practitioners in what was seen in the 1960s as a crisis in general practice. In 1962 he appeared on an ITV television programme Questions in the House with fellow FFM member and member of Parliament Dr Donald McIntosh Johnson to discuss medical migration.

In 1962 he undertook a speaking tour of the United States, funded by the American Medical Association, as part of efforts to undermine the Kennedy administration's proposed Medicare bill. In a speech in New York on 21 May 1962, President Kennedy criticised Seale's arguments. After seeing this reported in London's Evening Standard, Seale obtained a copy of the speech from the White House and sued the newspaper's publishers for misrepresenting the President's words.

Seale later became influential in health matters with the free-market supporting Institute for Economic Affairs, contributing to their publications such as their occasional paper Towards a Welfare Society in 1967.

=== Views on HIV and AIDS ===
In the 1980s, Seale advocated the now-discredited theory that HIV, which causes AIDS, might have been created in a germ-warfare laboratory by gene-editing and released either deliberately or by accident. In mid 1985, worried by the implications of the spread of the virus, Seale argued that it had national security implications for the west by potentially diminishing the effectiveness of NATO forces to such an extent that the Soviet Union would not need to use nuclear or chemical weapons to win a war, but he continued to believe that the virus had a natural origin in monkeys.

Later, he began to consider the possibility that the virus was man-made after reading an article by Valentin Zapevalov, "Panic in the West: or what Hides Behind the Sensationalism of AIDS", and an interview with professor S. Drozdov, "AIDS: Panic Continues", published in the non-scientific Literaturnaya Gazeta in Russia in October and December 1985 respectively. Zapevalov argued that the virus might have been produced by scientists working for the U.S. military at Fort Detrick in Maryland or at the Centers for Disease Control and Prevention in Atlanta, while Drozdov said that the virus was "apparently taken out from the deepest regions of Central Africa" thus raising the possibility that it was deliberately collected. He also stated that the virus could have been man-made.

Seale argued that centres for biological warfare research had known about the Visna virus in sheep since 1949 which he said had a similar structure to HIV, differing by only one gene, and caused a disease with similar symptoms. He believed that HIV could have been produced by gene-editing as "Inserting an extra gene into a virus is a routine procedure in modern genetic engineering". His view that the virus could have been created in a laboratory was reported in Britain's communist Morning Star and on Radio Moscow who stated that it supported the possibility that the virus was made by the United States as a weapon. Jakob Segal, an East German biologist, later revealed to be a KGB agent, wrote to Seale in support of his views about a man-made origin for the virus.

His views were criticised by exiled Russian dissident Zhores Medvedev in the letters page of the Journal of the Royal Society of Medicine in August 1986 as potentially spreading Soviet disinformation. Seale's reply was printed below in which he made it clear that he did not know for sure where the virus might have been created, but maintaining the likelihood of its man-made origin. He also compared the international spread of the virus to the spread of myxomatosis in rabbits in the 1950s which had been caused by the deliberate release of two infected rabbits on an estate in France.

Seale's theories were supported by his friend at St Thomas's, Henry A. Sanford, with whom he had been a medical student, and Sanford wrote in support of them in the medical and general press. Seale's views and writings, which were mostly in the form of opinion pieces, letters, and book reviews, rather than scientific papers, were used by those that advocated a man-made origin for HIV as evidence of scientific research in support of their position and may have influenced American politician Lyndon LaRouche's views on the need to isolate those with HIV and therefore, indirectly, the proposal in California's Proposition 64 in 1986 to restore AIDS to the list of communicable diseases.

In February 1987, Seale argued in a paper given before the Bristol Medico Chirurgical Society, and later printed in their journal, that the threat from AIDS was so serious that only compulsory government testing and methods to prevent homosexual men infecting each other and non-homosexuals could halt it with an inevitable and justified curtailment of civil rights as occurs when a country faces war. He further argued that the use of condoms would have no effect on the spread of the disease as, in his view, dirty needles, blood, and serum were the most effective methods of transmission. He also blamed homosexuals among AIDS scientists and campaigners for perpetuating, in his view, incorrect ideas about the spread of the disease. In May 1987, Seale and Zhores A. Medvedev argued in an article in the Journal of the Royal Society of Medicine that HIV in Russia was spread primarily through the re-use of poorly sterilised hypodermic needles rather than through sexual activity.

Records relating to Seale's theories and his supporter Henry A. Sanford are held in the Wellcome Collection which received them from Sanford in 2013.

== Personal life and death ==
Seale married Elisabeth C. Grillet in Cambridge in 1949.

Seale died at his home in Devon on 19 April 2020, at the age of 92.

== Selected publications ==
=== 1960s ===
- "Fixed Costs in the Health Service", The Lancet, Vol. 276, No. 7152 (24 September 1960), pp. 696–698. https://doi.org/10.1016/S0140-6736(60)91767-0
- "The Supply of Doctors", British Medical Journal, 2, 9 December 1961, 2, pp. 1554–55.
- The Supply of Doctors and the Future of the British Medical Profession. Fellowship for Freedom in Medicine, London, 1962.
- "Medical Emigration from Great Britain and Ireland", British Medical Journal, 1964, No. 1, pp. 1173–78.
- Seale, JR (1966). "The sexually-transmitted diseases and marriage". Br J Vener Dis. 42 (1): 31–6. doi:10.1136/sti.42.1.31. PMC 1047771. PMID 5952270.

=== 1970s ===
- "Vaginal discharge" in Geoffrey Chamberlain (Ed.) (1977) Contemporary Obstetrics and Gynaecology. London: Northwood.

=== 1980s ===
- Seale, John (1985). "AIDS Virus Infection: Prognosis and Transmission". Journal of the Royal Society of Medicine. 78 (8): 613–615. doi:10.1177/014107688507800801. PMC 1289829. PMID 2991514.
- Seale, J (1987). "The AIDS Epidemic and Its Control". Bristol Med Chir J. 102 (3): 66–68. doi:10.1177/014107688708000402. PMC 5113556. PMID 28906764.
- Seale, JR; Medvedev, ZA (1987). "Origin and transmission of AIDS. Multi-use hypodermics and the threat to the Soviet Union: discussion paper". J R Soc Med. 80 (5): 301–4. doi:10.1177/014107688708000515. PMC 1290815. PMID 3612664.
- Seale, JR; Medvedev, ZA (1987). "Origin and transmission of AIDS. Multi-use hypodermics and the threat to the Soviet Union: discussion paper". J R Soc Med. 80 (5): 301–4. doi:10.1177/014107688708000515. PMC 1290815. PMID 3612664.
- Seale, J (1989). "Origins of the AIDS viruses: HIV-1 and HIV-2, fact or fiction?". J R Soc Med. 82 (8): 508. doi:10.1177/014107688908200829. PMC 1292272. PMID 2778789.
