= Ken Norton (cricketer) =

English cricketer (1932–2018)

Kenneth Norton (2 November 1932 - 16 June 2018 (aged 85)) was an English cricketer. He was a right-handed batsman and left-arm slow bowler who played for Northumberland. He was born in Gateshead and educated at Gateshead Secondary School, later called Gateshead Grammar School.

Norton played in the Minor Counties Championship for Northumberland between 1954 and 1980.

Norton appeared in three List A matches between 1971 and 1977. He did not bat in any of them, took one catch in the outfield, and bowled 18.4 overs in all, taking two wickets.

He still holds the record for the most wickets for Tynedale.

Norton's brother Don was a cricket umpire who stood in three List A matches.
