= Hilger & Watts =

British company

Hilger & Watts was a well-known British manufacturing company that made theodolites and scientific instruments.

== History ==
It was founded on 20 February 1948 when Adam Hilger, Ltd, founded in 1874, merged with Messrs E. R. Watts and Son by Edwin Richard Watts (1833–1901) and George William Watts (c. 1871–1954), founded in 1865. The company was taken over by the Rank Organisation in 1969 and later sold on.

== Structure ==
It employed around 1,300 people in six factories in the late 1940s. It was situated on Camberwell Road (A215 road) in Camberwell, near the junction with the B214, between Walworth (to the north) and Camberwell (to the south) on the western edge of Burgess Park, now part of the London Borough of Southwark. There was a factory in Highbury, together with the head office in Camden Town and a small factory situated between Margate and Ramsgate in Kent. These locations were primarily "Hilger" products, whereas Camberwell was primarily Watts products. The company also had a factory at Loughton (Debden) in Essex

== Products ==
- Optical instruments
- Photometers
- Theodolite and surveying equipment
- Tripods
- Computer controlled X-ray diffractometers

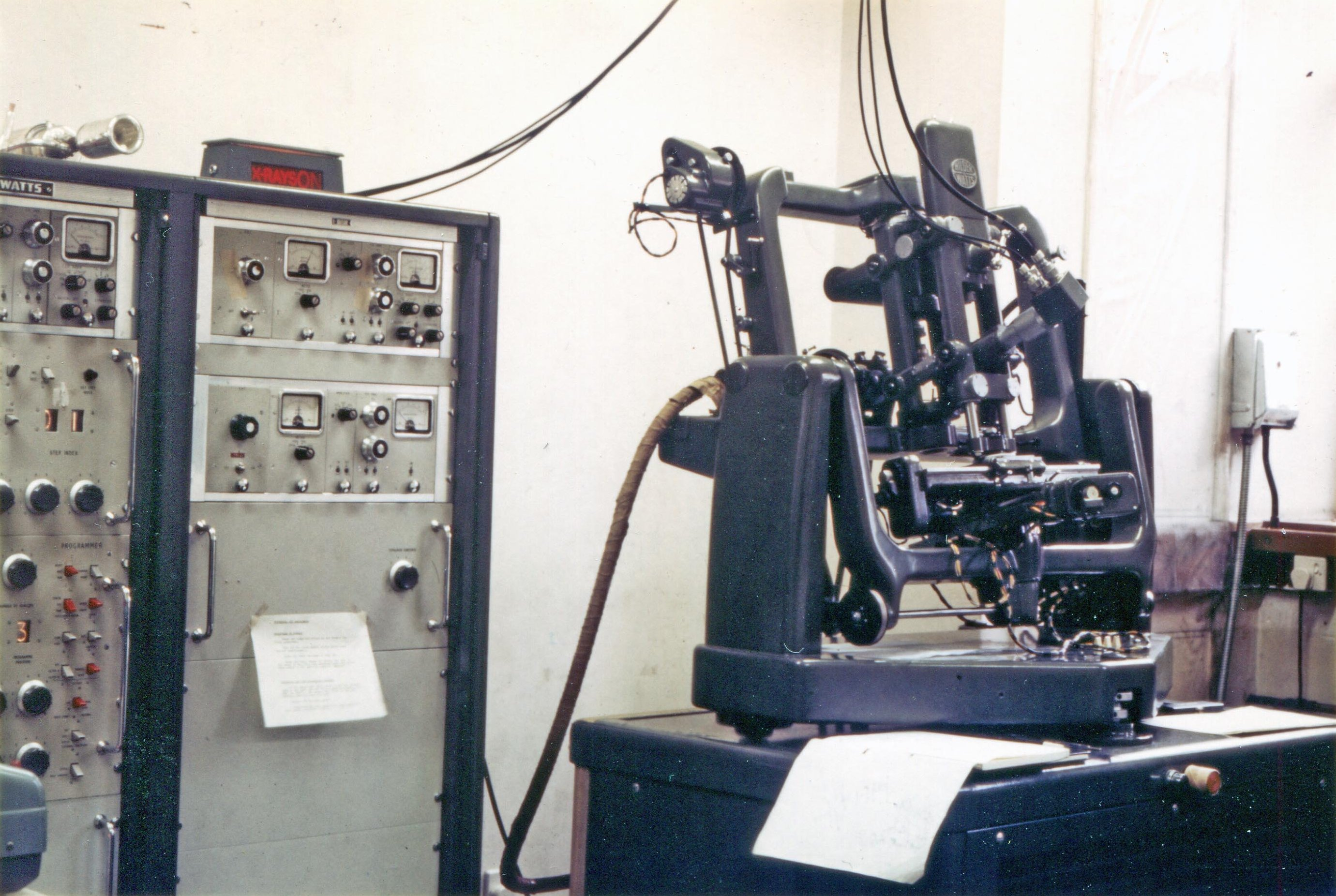
A Hilger and Watts Y190 linear X-ray diffractometer.

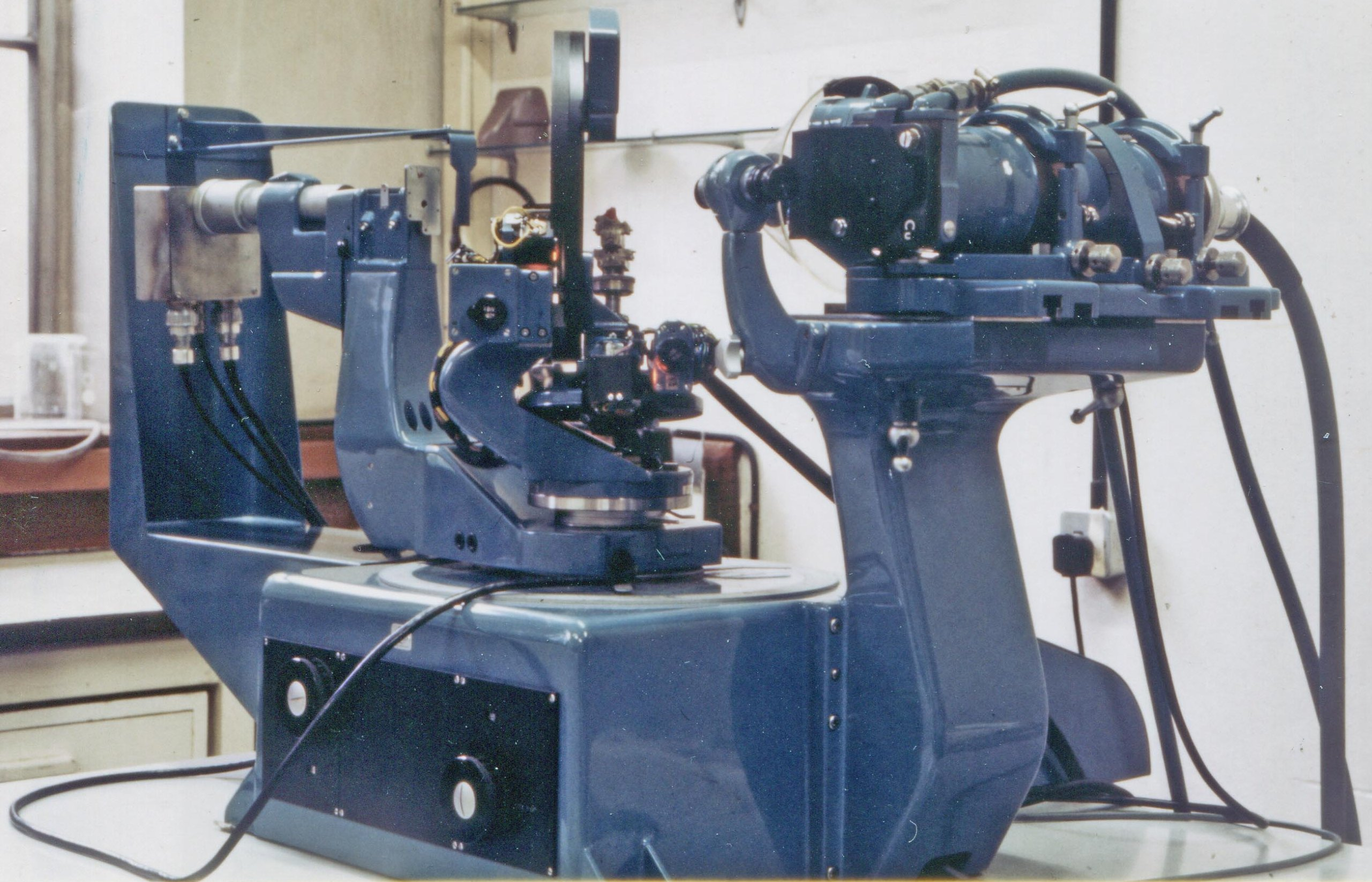
A Hilger and Watts Y290 four-circle X-ray diffractometer.

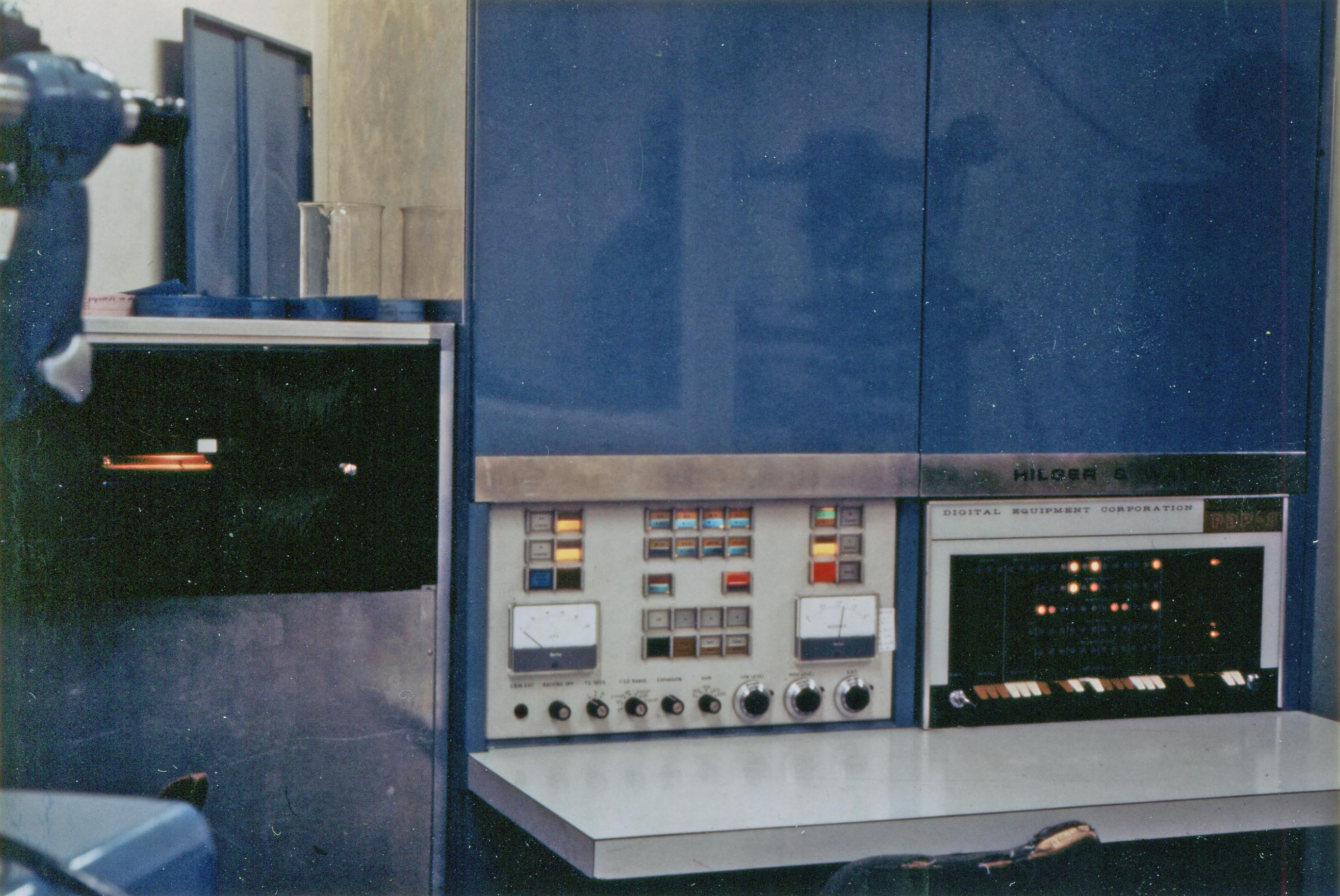
The control electronics for a Hilger and Watts Y290 four-circle X-ray diffractometer including a PDP-8 minicomputer.

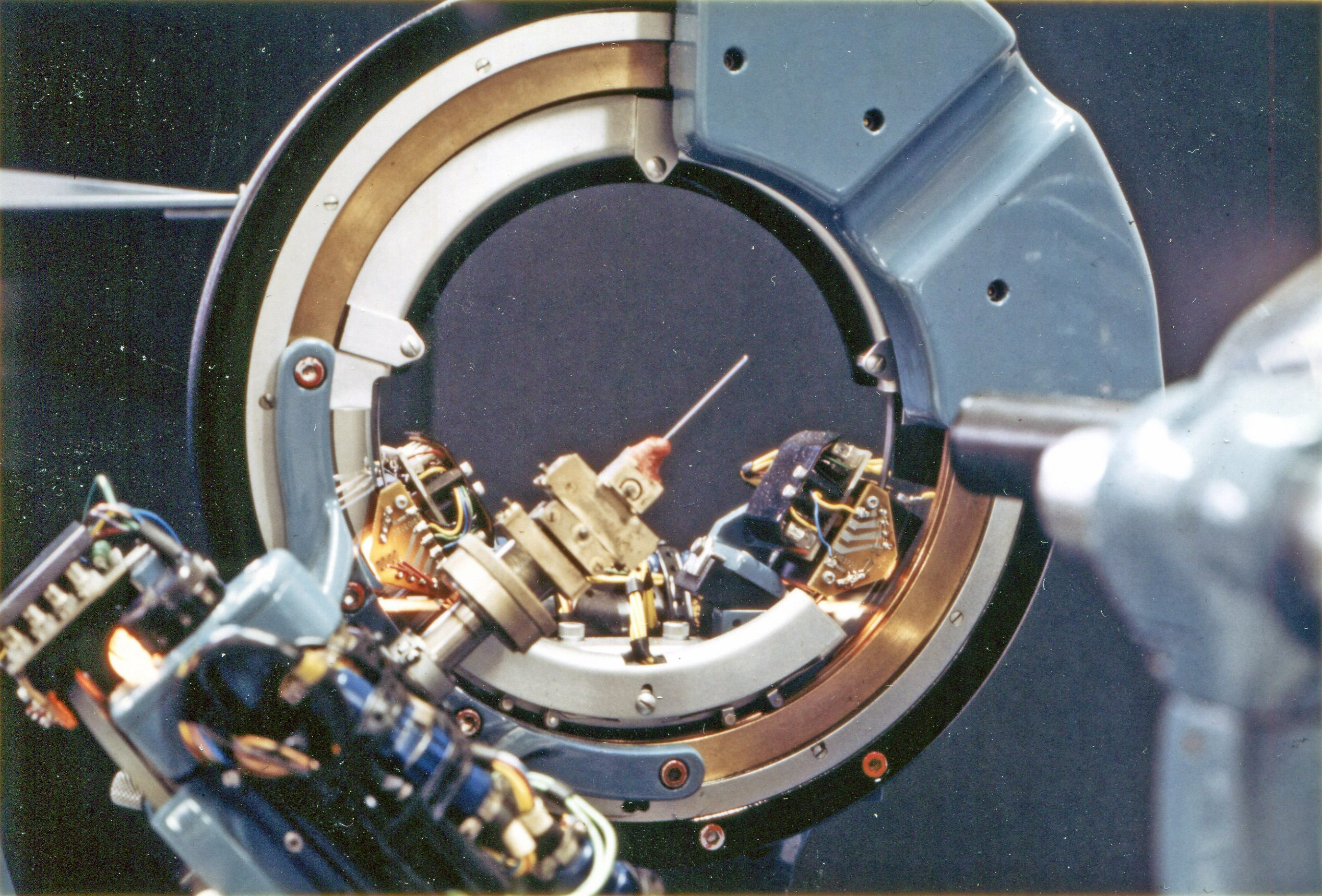
Close-up of the crystal mounted on a Hilger and Watts Y290 diffractometer.

Amongst other devices, the Camden location produced PDP-8 computer-driven X-ray diffractometers in the mid-late 1960s, one of which is believed to be still functional at Oxford University Chemistry Dept. in 2017. Development began with a linear diffractometer in the late 1950s - early 1960s but this was superseded around 1965 by the Y290, a four-circle diffractometer, the electronics for which were developed at the University of Manchester by Prof David B.G. Edwards (Computer Science) along with Owen S. Mills (Chemistry). The early models (actually referenced Y230) used a Ferranti computer for controlling the diffractometer but, due to reliability issues, the cheaper and more compact PDP-8 became the computer of choice for the Y290 model. One of the production engineers claimed that the electronic research department in Camden (headed by Arthur Long) had PDP-8 No 4 from Digital Equipment Corporation (DEC), so Hilger and Watts was likely to have been one of the first PDP-8 customers. The book ‘Single Crystal Diffractometry’ by U.W. Arndt and B.T.M. Willis (C.U.P., 1966) has photographs and other excellent diagrams showing the construction of these machines; both authors were involved in their development. The four-circle diffractometer was originally designed for neutron work at the Atomic Energy Research Establishment Harwell Laboratory but it became better known in field of X-ray crystallography. Photographs showing prototypes of both instruments may be seen in a review article by U.W. Arndt. For commercial production of the four-circle diffractometer, Hilger and Watts won two Queen's Awards to Industry, the first for Services to Export in 1966 and the second for Technological Achievement in 1968. In the late 1960s the cost of the four-circle system was around $130,000.

The Y290 diffractometer had an optical motor-positioning system based on moiré fringes which were recorded by photocells - sometimes the user would find that after centring their crystal under a bright light and forgetting to turn it off, the diffractometer motors would completely lose their settings. The correct positioning could be restored by a command which returned the motors to built-in datum points. In fact, the motors were regularly driven back to datum during data collection as a check on their positioning. The X-ray data were written to paper tape and, by the mid-1980s, users were struggling to find computer facilities which could still read their tapes for downstream analysis. At the Laboratory of Molecular Biophysics, University of Oxford, a 5-circle version of the machine was developed for protein crystallography which could measure up to five X-ray reflections in each scan due to the addition of a tiltable linear array of 5 counters to the detector arm. In Galway a BBC micro hard wired to the PDP8 front panel and a reflection indexing program were used to automate the Y290 (getting rid of the paper tape) and another group has described complete modernisation of the Y290 motors and control electronics.

== See also ==
- Watts reflected decimal code
