= National Caucus of Labor Committees =

American political organization within the LaRouche movement

The National Caucus of Labor Committees (NCLC) is a political organization in the United States founded and controlled by political activist Lyndon LaRouche until his 2019 death. LaRouche sometimes described the NCLC as a "philosophical association". It is the main organization within the LaRouche movement. LaRouche was the association's leader, and the political views of the NCLC are virtually indistinguishable from those of LaRouche.

The highest group within the NCLC is the National Executive Committee (NEC), described as the "inner leadership circle", or "an elite circle of insiders", which "oversees policy". The next most senior group is the National Committee (NC), which is reportedly "one step beneath the NEC".

== History ==
=== Formation ===
The NCLC had it origins in the 1968 convention of the Students for a Democratic Society. It comprised people who had been expelled from the Maoist Progressive Labor Party, an SDS faction, and students from Columbia University in New York City. It called itself the "SDS Labor Committee" or the "National Caucus of SDS Labor Committees". Led by LaRouche, it included "New Left lieutenants" Ed Spannaus, Nancy Spannaus, and Tony Papert, as well as Paul Milkman, Paul Gallagher, Leif Johnson, Tony Chaitkin, and Steve Fraser. The Labor Committee was known for promoting a "socialist re-industrialization" of the economy, combined with confiscatory taxes on what it saw as wasteful and parasitic investment. It was expelled from SDS for taking the side of the teachers' union in the Ocean Hill-Brownsville strike. It was originally a New Left organization influenced by Trotskyist ideas as well as those of other Marxists such as Rosa Luxemburg, but opposed other New Left organizations which LaRouche said were dominated by the Ford Foundation, Institute for Policy Studies and Herbert Marcuse.

The organization became the NCLC in January 1969. According to the Los Angeles Times, LaRouche writes in his autobiography that in 1971 the NCLC formed "intelligence units", and the following year started training members in paramilitary tactics.

=== Operation Mop Up ===
According to The Village Voice and The Washington Post, the NCLC became embroiled in the early 1970s in conflicts with other leftist groups, culminating in "Operation Mop-Up," which consisted of a series of physical attacks on members of rival left wing groups.

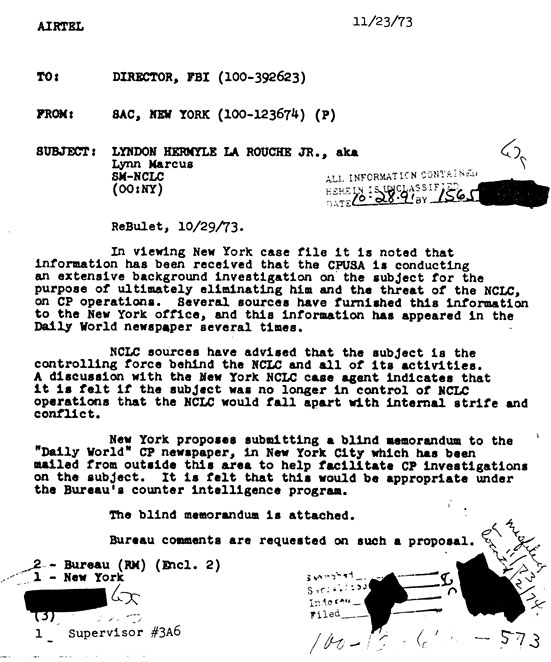
A 1973 internal FBI letter recommended that the FBI provide anonymous aid to a background investigation by the Communist Party USA.

During "Operation Mop-Up," LaRouche's New Solidarity reported NCLC confrontations with members of the Communist Party and Socialist Workers Party. One incident took place April 23, 1973 at a debate featuring Labor Committee mayoral candidate Tony Chaitkin. The meeting erupted in a brawl, with chairs flying. Six people were treated for injuries at a local hospital. Following this incident, New Solidarity warned:

The clown show is over. The Labor Committee warns the Socialist Workers Party and its comrades-in-hysteria: when you did all the fighting for the Communist Party at the mayoral forum, we held back – we gave you a mild warning, though several of your members were bloodied and broken. But should you repeat as goons for the CP, we will put all of you in the hospital; we will deal with you as we are dealing with the Communist Party.

In November 1973, the FBI issued an internal memorandum that was later released under the Freedom of Information Act. Jeffrey Steinberg, LaRouche spokesperson and NCLC "director of counterintelligence", described it as the "COINTELPRO memo", which he says showed "that the FBI was considering supporting an assassination attempt against LaRouche by the Communist Party USA." LaRouche wrote in 1988:

The U.S. Communist Party was committed to putting the Labor Committees out of existence physically... Local law enforcement was curiously uncooperative, as they had been during prior physical attacks on myself and my friends. We knew that a 'fix' was in somewhere, probably from the FBI... We were left to our own resources. Tired of the beatings, we decided we had better prepare to defend ourselves if necessary.

=== 1974–1986 ===
By the mid-1970s, the NCLC had abandoned Marxism altogether, in favor of what its members described as an American System approach. Press accounts describe shift to the right, with the NCLC establishing ties to the Ku Klux Klan and the Liberty Lobby. The conservative Heritage Foundation issued a report which states that "neither the Left nor the Right has a thoroughly-documented explanation of the organization's nature or purposes."

According to the Los Angeles Times, LaRouche said he met with representatives of the Soviet Union at the United Nations in 1974 and 1975 in order to discuss attacks by the Communist Party USA on the NCLC, and to propose that the CPUSA should be merged into the NCLC. He denied receiving any assistance from the Soviets.

The NCLC established a paramilitary "officers training camp" in Argyle, New York in 1974, according to an FBI report. Members learned about "small unit tactics and strategy", and trained with nunchaku. The FBI documents reportedly also mention "beatings" and "brainwashings", claim that the group moved from far-left to far-right, and complain that NCLC sent in tips about wild conspiracies.

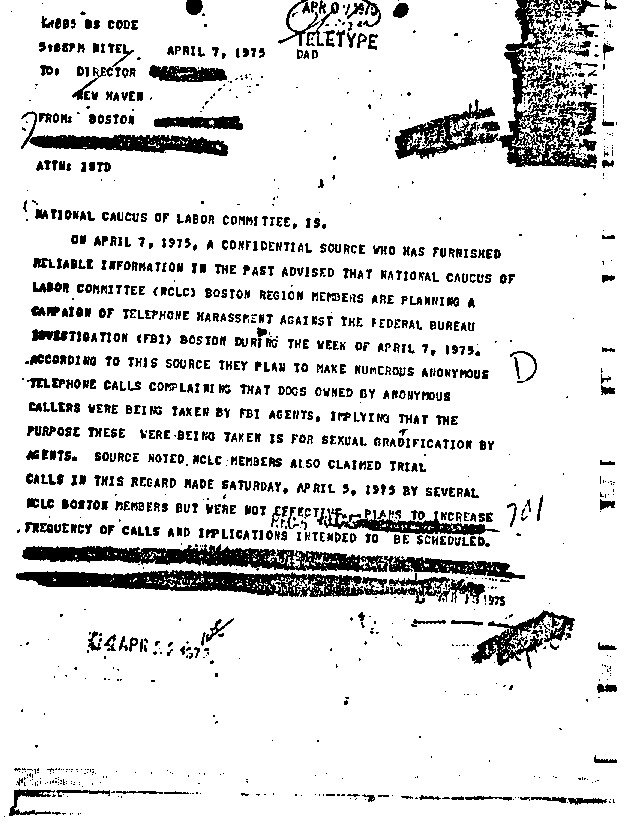
Internal FBI memo from 1975 warning about harassment of agents by NCLC members

In 1974, NCLC members admitted they had been harassing FBI agents for years.

According to LaRouche in 1995, during the period 1976-1978 the NCLC ceased being a dues-paying membership organization, and made the transition to a "purely philosophical-legal organization," whose principal activities were either philosophical or in connection with legal cases against the COINTELPRO and related offenses of the FBI and associated agencies.

In 1977, Costas Axios, NCLC chief of staff for New York, said of the NCLC: "We are socialist, but first we must establish an industrialist capitalist republic and rid this country of the Rockefeller anti-industrial, antitechnology monetarist dictatorship of today." According to The Washington Post, FBI memoranda of the time described the NCLC as a "clandestinely oriented group of political schizophrenics who have a paranoid preoccupation with Nelson Rockefeller and the CIA", and as a "violence-oriented Marxist revolutionary organization."

The Los Angeles Times reported that by 1981, the NCLC was overseeing a network of companies and organizations that were budgeted to bring in $11.7 million in gross receipts annually. One company, Campaigner Publications Inc., was reported to have grossed $4.5 million in a four-month period. In a purported internal memo from 1981 LaRouche explained his position within the organization by saying, "I do not wish to hear, ever again, that I must wait until our legal council (sic) has assessed the wisdom of one of my decisions or that some members personal sensitivities must be taken into account...I promise you that I shall function, unrestrained, as a commanding general of a combat organization. Anyone who opposes my orders will, in the moral sense, be shot on the spot for insubordination."

In 1984 the headquarters were moved from Manhattan to Leesburg, Virginia, a suburb of Washington D.C.

The NCLC was indicted on charges of obstruction of justice in 1986 and its offices were searched. Federal prosecutors alleged that LaRouche "dominates and controls" the NCLC. A U.S. government memo reportedly said that "the primary purpose" of the NCLC is to support LaRouche in a lavish lifestyle and to "courier large sums of cash to secret depositories." Over a dozen NCLC members, including LaRouche himself, were eventually indicted. (See also LaRouche criminal trials)

== Electoral politics ==
The NCLC launched the U.S. Labor Party (USLP), a registered political party, in 1972 as its electoral arm and ran LaRouche for President of the United States on the USLP ticket in 1976 along with numerous candidates for lower office.

In 1979 LaRouche changed his political strategy to one of running in Democratic primaries rather than as a third party candidate. This resulted in the USLP being replaced by the National Democratic Policy Committee (NDPC) a political action committee unassociated with the Democratic National Committee.

== International work ==
The International Caucus of Labor Committees (ICLC) was founded as the philosophical nucleus for LaRouche movement operations worldwide. According to LaRouche the ICLC follows the "model of American founding father Benjamin Franklin's 'Junto' organization."

The ICLC has affiliates in Canada, France, Italy, Germany, Poland, Hungary, Russia, Denmark, and Sweden, Australia, Philippines, along with Mexico and several South American countries.

== Selected members ==
Included are present and former NCLC or ICLC members who have authored books, edited publications, or led LaRouche-affiliated organizations or companies.

- Michael Billington, author of Reflections of an American Political Prisoner, Asia editor for Executive Intelligence Review
- Mark Calney, Northwest coordinator for the NDPC, author of Robert Burns and the Ideas of the American Revolution
- Claudio Cesani, editor-in-chief of New Solidarity magazine.
- Anton Chaitkin, founding member of the NCLC, author of Treason in America, co-author of The Unauthorized Biography of George Bush, and history editor for Executive Intelligence Review
- Marsha Freeman, associate editor of 21st Century Science & Technology, author of How we got to the moon : the story of the German space pioneers
- Paul Gallagher, executive director of the former Fusion Energy Foundation (FEF)
- Khushro Ghandhi, president of Prevent AIDS Now Initiative Committee (California state ballot initiative, 1986)
- John Grauerholz, head of the Biological Holocaust Task Force
- Nora Hamerman, EIR editor-in-chief
- Warren Hamerman, chairman of the NDPC
- Laurence Hecht, editor-in-chief of 21st Century Science and Technology magazine
- Linda de Hoyos, president of EIR News Service
- Konstandinos Kalimtgis (AKA Costas Axios), NCLC chief of staff, co-author of Dope, Inc.: Britain's Opium War Against the U.S.
- Kenneth Kronberg (1948–2007), former editor of Fidelio, member of the National Committee from 1974 to 2007.
- Helga Zepp LaRouche, founder of the Schiller Institute
- H Graham Lowry, author of How the nation was won : America's untold story, 1630-1754
- Quincy O'Neal, chairman of the Franklin Roosevelt Legacy Democratic Club
- Tony Papert, early leader of the SDS Labor Committee, founding member of the NCLC
- Amelia Boynton Robinson, vice president of the Schiller Institute, author of Bridge Across Jordan
- J. Philip Rubinstein, president of Caucus Distributors, New York regional NCLC leader, National Committee member
- Allen Salisbury, head of the Revolutionary Youth Movement, author of The Civil War and the American System.
- John Sigerson, president of the Schiller Institute in the U.S., director of the Schiller Institute Chorus, co-author of A Manual on the Rudiments of Tuning and Registration.
- Edward Spannaus, founding member of the NCLC, treasurer of LaRouche's 1984 and 1988 presidential campaigns, LaRouche's legal coordinator
- Nancy Spannaus, editor-in-chief, New Federalist, former Editor-in-Chief, New Solidarity, founding member of the Schiller Institute, co-author of The Political economy of the American Revolution
- Jeffrey Steinberg, counterintelligence director for Executive Intelligence Review, co-author of Dope, inc. : Britain's opium war against the U.S.
- Webster Tarpley, former president of the Schiller Institute in the U.S., co-author of The Unauthorized Biography of George Bush
- Jonathan Tennenbaum, head of the European Fusion Energy Forum, scientific advisor to the Schiller Institute, the Executive Intelligence Review, and Lyndon LaRouche, member of the scientific advisory board of 21st Century Science & Technology, author of Kernenergie: das weibliche Technik,
- Carol White, former editor-in-chief, 21st Century Science & Technology, author, The New Dark Ages Conspiracy : Britain's Plot to Destroy Civilization and Energy Potential: Toward a New Electromagnetic Field Theory
- Christopher White, EIR Director, co-author of The Political economy of the American Revolution
- Kathy Wolfe, spokeswoman of U.S. Presidential pre-candidate Lyndon LaRouche, co-author of A Manual on the Rudiments of Tuning and Registration.
- Criton Zoakos, NCLC intelligence director, EIR editor-in-chief
