= Executive Intelligence Review =

American LaRouchist magazine

- Executive Intelligence Review cover
- Founder: Lyndon LaRouche
- Categories: Political magazine
- Frequency: weekly
- Publisher: EIR News Service Inc.
- Founded: 1974
- Country: United States
- Based in: Leesburg, Virginia
- Language: English
- Website: www.larouchepub.com
- ISSN: 0273-6314

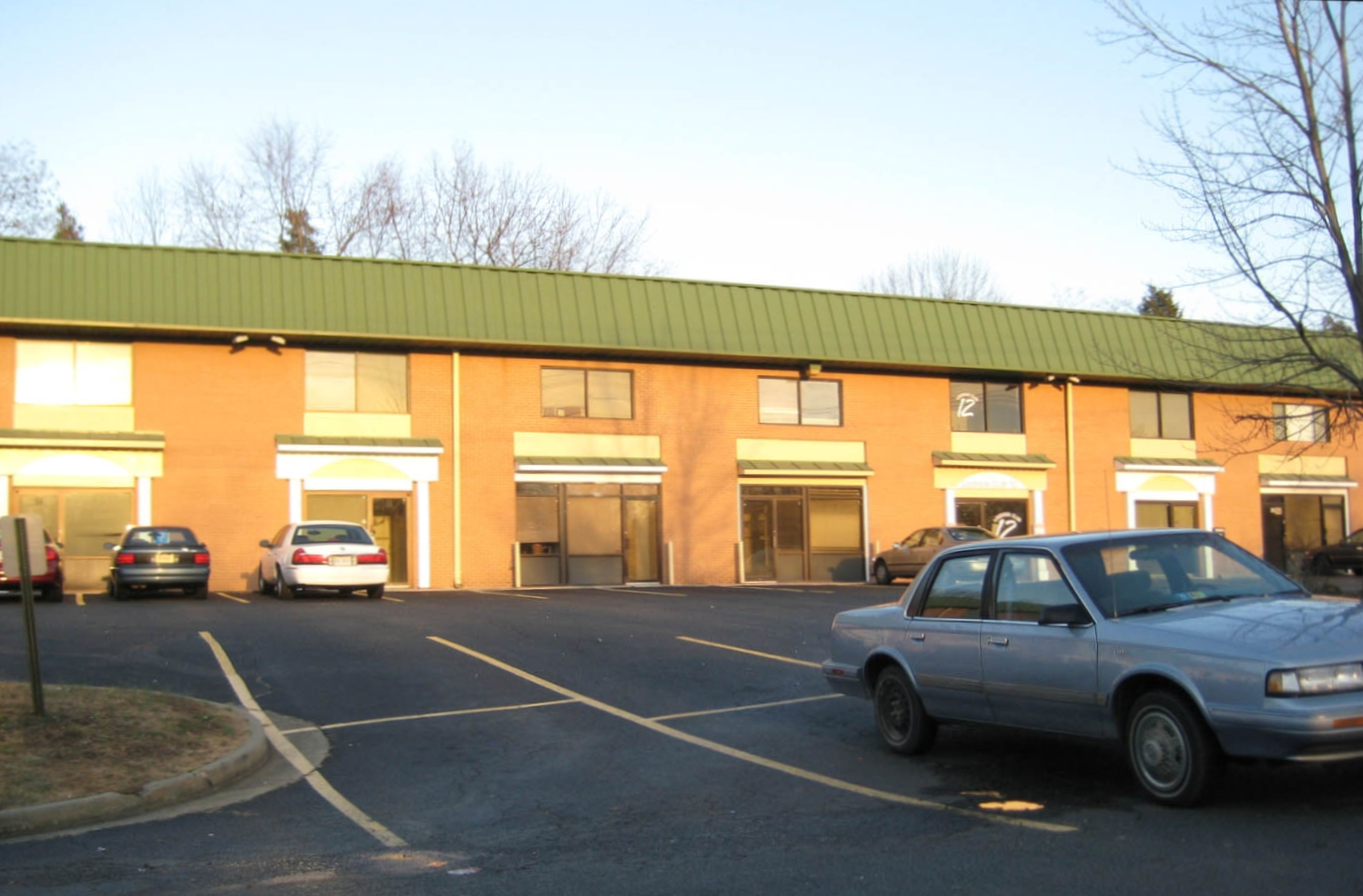
The offices of Executive Intelligence Review, Leesburg, Virginia

Executive Intelligence Review (EIR) is a weekly newsmagazine founded in 1974 by the American political activist Lyndon LaRouche. Based in Leesburg, Virginia, it maintains offices in a number of countries, according to its masthead, including Wiesbaden, Berlin, Copenhagen, Paris, Melbourne, and Mexico City. As of 2009, the editor of EIR was Nancy Spannaus. As of 2015, it was reported that Nancy Spannaus was no longer editor-in-chief, that position being held jointly by Paul Gallagher and Tony Papert.

EIR is owned by the LaRouche movement. The New Solidarity International Press Service, or NSIPS, was a news service credited as the publisher of EIR and other LaRouche publications. New Solidarity International Press Service was supplanted by EIR News Service because New Solidarity newspaper was closed in 1987, after the massive 1986 Federal raid on LaRouche's headquarters in Leesburg, Virginia.

== History ==
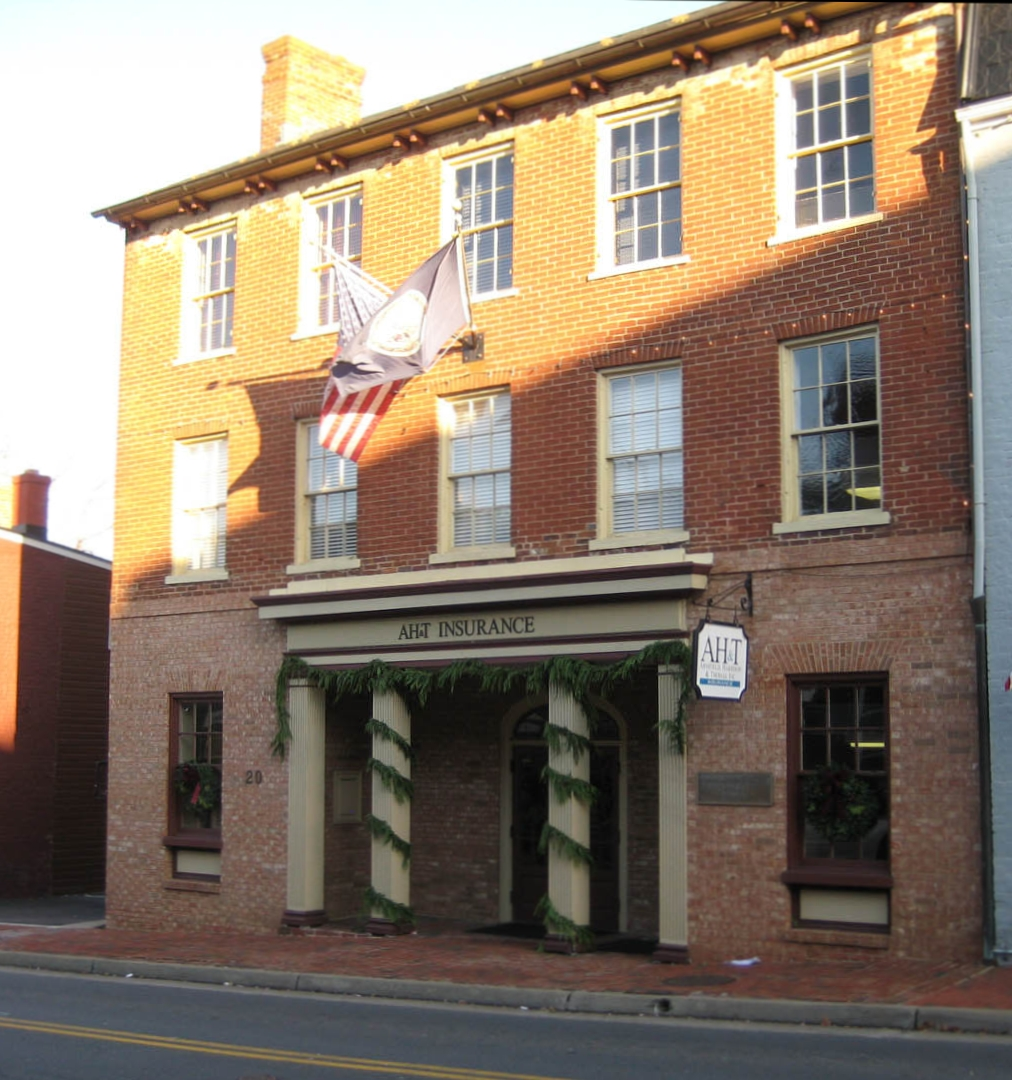
The Wheat Building in Leesburg, offices of Executive Intelligence Review in the 1980s

John Rausch writes that the magazine emerged from LaRouche's desire in the 1970s to form a global intelligence network. His idea was to organize the network as if it were a news service, which led to his founding The New Solidarity International Press Service (NSIPS), incorporated by three of LaRouche's followers in 1974. According to Rausch, this allowed the LaRouche movement to gain access to government officials under press cover. As NSIPS's funds grew, EIR was created. EIR "exposés" contributed information for LaRouche's various conspiracy theories.

The EIR was originally modeled on the Business International Corp (BI) newsletter "Business International" that was subsequently acquired by The Economist Group. The idea at the time was to publish a weekly magazine that could serve as a briefing on world affairs for international governments and businesses.

In the 1980s an annual subscription cost $400. Nora Hamerman, an EIR editor, said in 1990 that the magazine had a circulation of 8,000 to 10,000. She indicated the magazine was owned by the EIR News Service, but declined to say who owned the news service. An ad on a LaRouche website urged readers to subscribe: "As you will quickly discover, the Executive Intelligence Review is not an ordinary weekly news magazine."

EIR offices were searched in 1986 as part of an investigation into LaRouche-related businesses in the indictment of certain individuals for credit card fraud involving the organization. In 1988, EIR offices shared with another LaRouche entity, Fusion Energy Foundation, were seized to pay contempt of court fines related to the investigation. Contributing editor Webster Tarpley said that the closure was an effort by "the invisible, secret, parallel government" to silence LaRouche because of his presidential campaigns. LaRouche and several EIR staff members were eventually convicted of mail fraud and other charges.

== Reports and claims ==
The magazine has published many contentious articles, including claims that Queen Elizabeth II is the head of an international drug-smuggling cartel, that another member of the British royal family killed Roberto Calvi, the Italian banker who died in London in 1982, and that the Oklahoma City bombing in 1995 was the first strike in a British attempt to take over the United States. In 1997 it published review of the book "La face cachee de Greenpeace" (The hidden face of Greenpeace), which claimed that Greenpeace "is an irregular warfare apparatus in the service of the British oligarchy". The magazine occasionally expands its articles into book-length pieces, which have included Dope, Inc: The Book that Drove Henry Kissinger Crazy (1992) and The Ugly Truth about the ADL.

In 1998, one of its senior writers, Jeffrey Steinberg, was interviewed on British television regarding LaRouche's theory that Prince Philip had ordered British intelligence to assassinate Diana, Princess of Wales. EIR has been described as the "foremost exponent of the 'murder, not accident' theory" of Diana's death. In 1999, EIR made international news when it listed on its website the names of 117 agents of the United Kingdom's MI6 intelligence service, a list claimed to have been obtained from renegade agent Richard Tomlinson (although the government later conceded that the list did not originate with him). An EIR spokesman said they received the information unsolicited.

In 1992, the EIR published The Ugly Truth About the ADL, a 150-page pamphlet with conspiratorial allegations about the Anti-Defamation League, which LaRouche had promised to "crush". The pamphlet alleged that the group was "one of the most pernicious agencies working to destroy the United States".

Following criticism of financier George Soros by Malaysian Prime Minister Mahathir Mohamad in 1997, Malaysian news media began printing vitriolic reports of Soros, some of them sourced to EIR or even copying text from the magazine verbatim. Ahmad Kassim, a politician who was instrumental in introducing LaRouche's ideas to Malaysians, described EIR as a "news service like Reuters or anything else" and compared LaRouche to Abraham Lincoln.

Executive Intelligence Review published the English edition of a book by Sergei Glazyev entitled Genocide: Russia and the New World Order which alleged that forces of the New World Order worked against the interests of Russia in the 1990s to create economic policies that amounted to "genocide". It contained a preface by LaRouche.

== Related publications ==
- Investigative Leads, described as "an offshoot of the Executive Intelligence Review, which deals with antiterrorism, terrorist and drug-running activities."

== Notable staff and contributors ==
- Lyndon LaRouche, founder and contributing editor
- Nicholas Benton, former Washington D.C. bureau chief and White House correspondent
- Michael Billington, Asia editor
- Anton Chaitkin, history editor
- Robert Dreyfuss, former Middle East intelligence director
- F. William Engdahl, former contributor
- David P. Goldman, former contributor
- Laurent Murawiec, former editor and contributor
- Webster Tarpley, former contributing editor

== Books and reports ==
- Dope, Inc.: Britain's Opium War Against the World (1978)
- AIDS Global Showdown: Mankind's Total Victory or Total Defeat for Victory (1988)
- The "Greenhouse Effect" Hoax: a World Federalist Plot (1989)
- The Ugly Truth About the Anti-Defamation League. Washington, D.C.: Executive Intelligence Review (1992).
- The Depression of the 1990s: America's Existential Crisis (1992)
