= Albert Pike Memorial =

Statue in Washington, D.C., U.S.

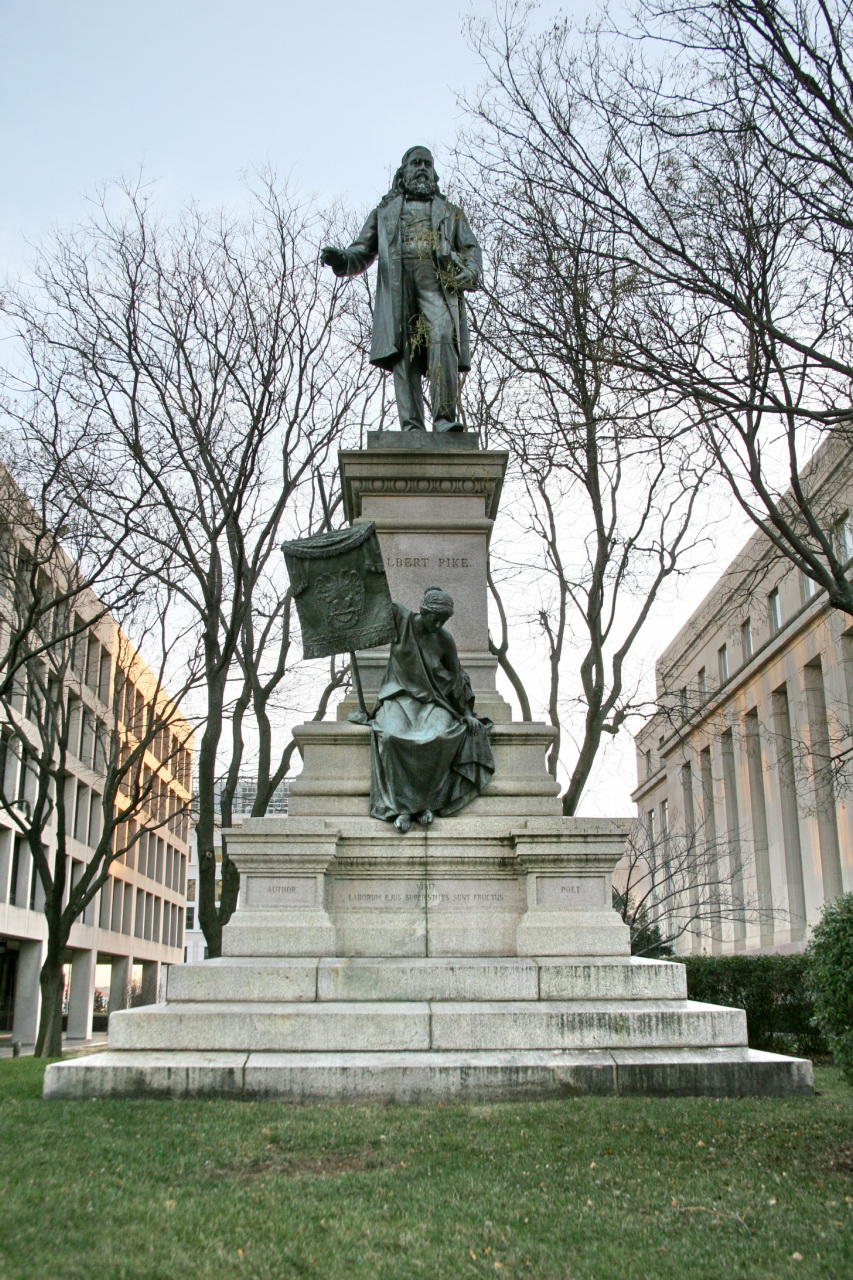
- Albert Pike Memorial in 2008
- Interactive map of Albert Pike Memorial
- Location: 3rd and D Streets NW, Washington, D.C., U.S.
- Coordinates: 38.8946°N 77.0157°W
- Albert Pike Memorial
- U.S. National Register of Historic Places
- U.S. Historic district – Contributing property
- Part of: Civil War Monuments in Washington, D.C.
- NRHP reference No.: 78000257
- Added to NRHP: September 20, 1978
- Designer: Gaetano Trentanove
- Material: bronze (sculpture) granite (base)
- Height: 28 feet (8.5 m) (sculpture and base)
- Opening date: October 23, 1901
- Dedicated to: Albert Pike

The Albert Pike Memorial is a public artwork in Washington, D.C. It honors Albert Pike (1809–1891), a senior officer of the Confederate States Army as well as a poet, lawyer, and influential figure in the Scottish Rite of freemasonry. The memorial sits near the corner of 3rd and D Streets NW in the Judiciary Square neighborhood. The memorial's two bronze figures were sculpted by Gaetano Trentanove, the Italian-American sculptor of another Washington, D.C., sculptural landmark, the Daniel Webster Memorial. The dedication ceremony in 1901 was attended by thousands of Masons who marched in a celebratory parade.

The memorial is one of 18 Civil War monuments in Washington, D.C., which were collectively listed on the National Register of Historic Places in 1978. The memorial is owned and maintained by the National Park Service (NPS), a federal agency of the Interior Department. The Pike statue is the only outdoor sculpture in Washington, D.C., honoring a Confederate general. Though Pike is depicted as a Mason, not a soldier, concerns and protests over the memorial have occurred for decades. It was partially demolished in 2020 by protestors responding to the murder of George Floyd. In 2025, the NPS refurbished and reinstalled the statue.

== History ==
=== Background ===
Albert Pike (1809–1891) was a Massachusetts native who became a schoolteacher and frontiersman before settling in Arkansas. There he began teaching again and continued to write poetry, a lifelong passion. His letters to local newspapers led to a job offer as an editor for the Arkansas Advocate, a newspaper in Little Rock affiliated with the Whig Party. Pike later became a successful lawyer specializing in Native American claims against the U.S. government. He served as a captain in the Mexican–American War and resumed his legal practice following the war. In the 1850s, Pike switched his allegiance to the Know Nothing Party due to the Whig Party's reluctance to embrace slavery and sided with the Confederacy when Southern states seceded from the United States in 1861.

During the Civil War, Pike's knowledge of Native Americans led to him being commissioned a brigadier general in the Confederate Army. Pike assembled an Indian cavalry loyal to the Confederacy and led them in battle at Pea Ridge, where his poor leadership and inability to keep the cavalry engaged with the enemy was a contributing factor to the Confederates' loss. Alleged atrocities committed by his troops include the scalping of captured enemy combatants. A few months after the battle, Pike resigned from the army and resumed practicing law. Following the war, Pike settled in Memphis, Tennessee, where it was rumored he became involved with the Ku Klux Klan (KKK), although "this is not certain."

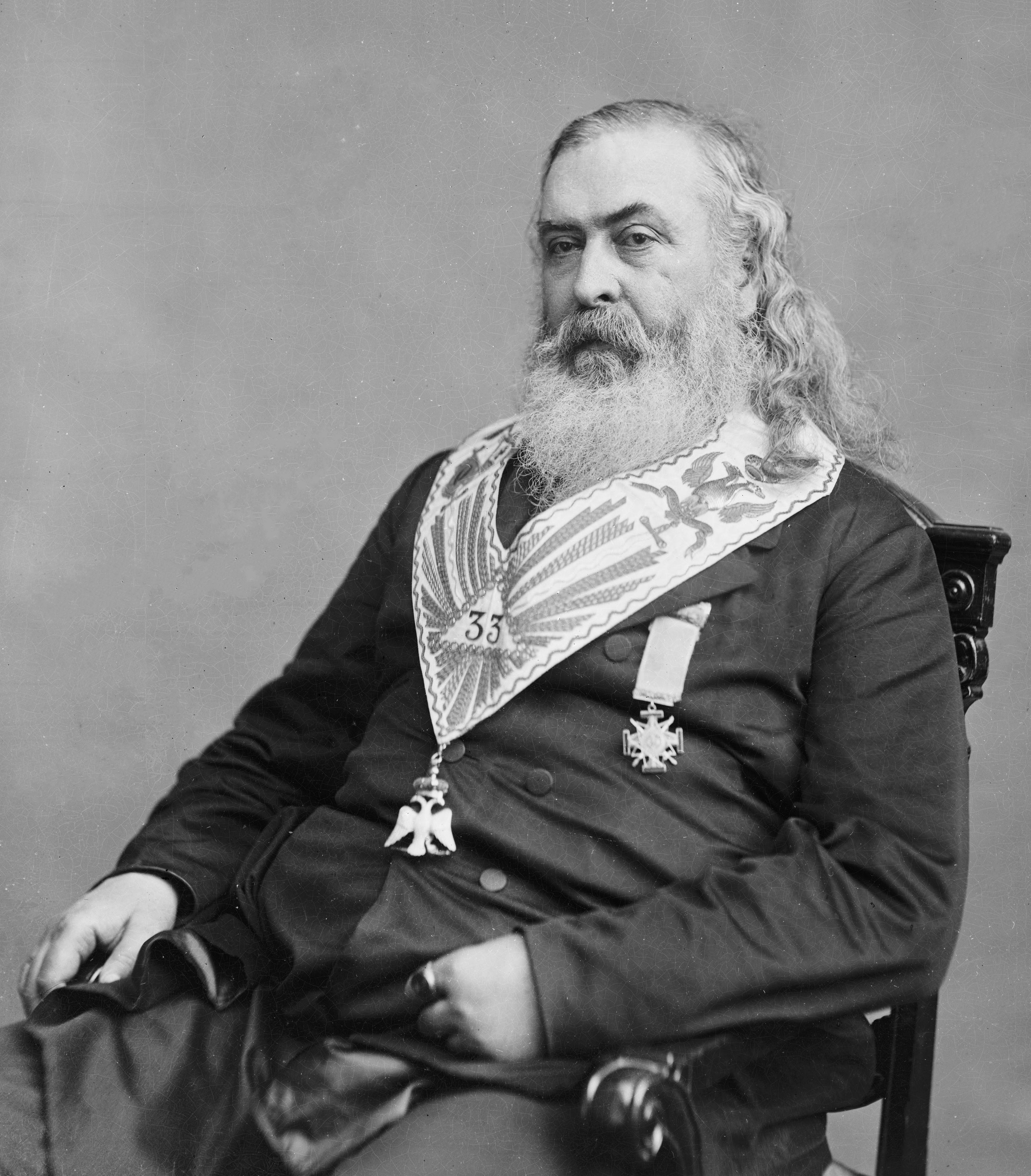
Albert Pike by Mathew Brady

Around 1870, Pike moved to Washington, D.C. to practice law and continue serving as Sovereign Grand Commander (SGC) of the Washington-based Supreme Council, Southern Jurisdiction (SC-SJ), one of two jurisdictions in the Scottish Rite. Pike had become a Mason in 1850 and quickly rose through its ranks, becoming the SGC in 1859. He rewrote and interpreted Masonic rituals and compiled the Southern Jurisdiction's first philosophical document, Morals and Dogma of the Ancient and Accepted Scottish Rite of Freemasonry, an influential book in the organization. Pike continued serving as SGC until he died in 1891.

Pike once stated, "When I am dead, I wish my monument to be builded only in the hearts and memories of my brethren of the Ancient and Accepted Rite". A few years after his death, Masons began plans for a monument in the nation's capital. The SC-SJ chose Italian-American artist Gaetano Trentanove to sculpt the memorial. Trentanove was an acquaintance of Pike and had recently received praise for his sculpture of Jacques Marquette housed in the National Statuary Hall Collection. While Trentanove was working on the commission, Masons lobbied members of Congress for public land in Washington, D.C., where the monument could be placed.

When members of the Grand Army of the Republic (GAR), a fraternal organization of Union veterans, became aware of plans for a public memorial to be erected in Washington, D.C. in honor of a Confederate general, they contacted congressmen and told them it would be a disgrace to the memories of all Union soldiers. On April 9, 1898, members of Congress approved the memorial after Masons assured them it would depict Pike as a civilian, not a soldier.

Excavation for the memorial site took place in the summer of 1899 and on July 4, 1900, the cornerstone was laid. Prior to the cornerstone ceremony, several members of the SC-SJ, including Third Assistant Secretary of State Thomas W. Cridler, gathered at the House of the Temple at 433 3rd Street NW (current site of the Tax Court Building), where Pike had lived, to reminisce. The men signed a parchment noting the date and who was in attendance. At the ceremony, the parchment was enclosed in a bottle and placed in an opening of the memorial's foundation. The total cost of the memorial was $15,000, raised by members of the SC-SJ. Fabrication was carried out by the Washington Granite Monumental Company and the sculptures founded by Fonderia Galli.

=== Dedication ===
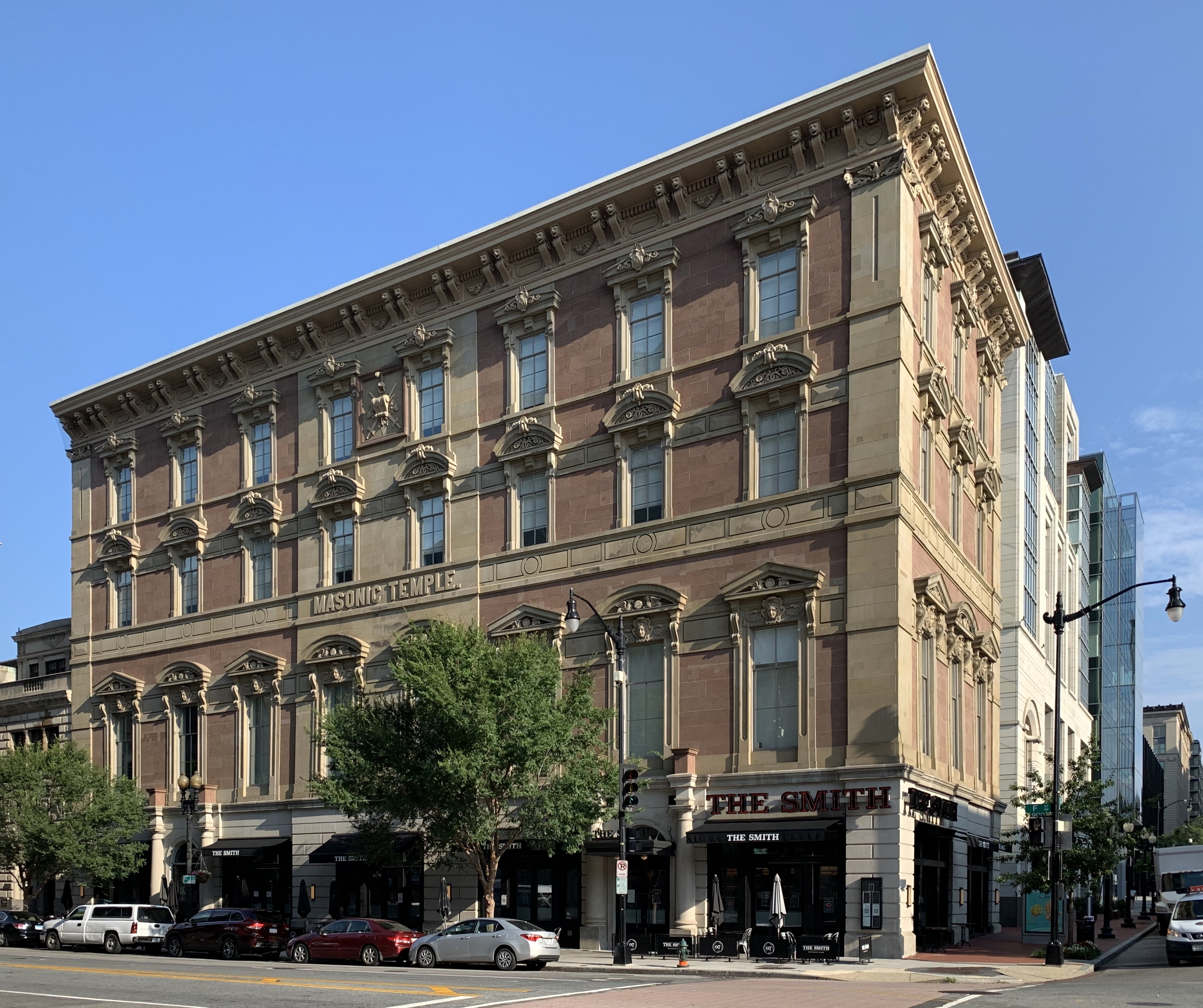
The dedication parade began at the Masonic Temple.

The dedication ceremony on October 23, 1901, was planned to coincide with the centennial anniversary of the SC-SJ. At 2 P.M., members of the Grand Lodge of the Masons of the District of Columbia led by Grand Master Harry Standiford marched from the Masonic Temple at 9th and F Streets NW to the House of the Temple where they joined thousands of Masons taking part in the parade. The parade ended at the memorial site, on a triangular lot bordered by 3rd Street, D Street, and Indiana Avenue NW. A large temporary stand for invited guests and ceremony participants was built at the base of the memorial.

Following a musical performance by Haley's Washington Band, grand commanders of the SC-SJ, the Scottish Rite's Northern Masonic Jurisdiction, and Royal Order of Scotland all released the halyard holding the U.S. flag that covered the memorial. This was followed by loud cheers from the crowd and a prayer given by Masonic chaplain Charles Alvin Smith. Frederick Webber, secretary general of the SC-SJ, then gave a speech and formally presented the memorial to the American people:

I am here to represent the Supreme Council, and in its name to present to the government of the United States this statue. It will long stand as a loving tribute from his brethren of the Ancient and Accepted Scottish Rite of Freemasonry.

— Frederick Webber, Evening Star, October 23, 1901

President of the District Commission H. B. F. McFarland accepted the memorial on behalf of the American people:

Although Albert Pike was a soldier in the Civil War, this statue will commemorate him rather as a victor in the honorable rivalries of peace. It is well that you thus add to the comparatively small number of statues in the city of Washington that honor the victories of peace rather than of war.

— H. B. F. McFarland, Evening Star, October 23, 1901

After the band performed additional music, a benediction was given, and the ceremony concluded. Throughout the ceremony, Pike was portrayed as a kind poet. There were a few references to his service as a Confederate general.

=== Later history ===
For many years, members of the United Daughters of the Confederacy would hold ceremonies at the site on Pike's birthday and Masons would decorate the memorial, though the latter still happens on occasion. The memorial was removed in 1972 during construction of Interstate 395 and reinstalled in September 1977 near its former site. The memorial is one of 18 Civil War monuments in Washington, D.C., which were collectively listed on the National Register of Historic Places on September 20, 1978, and the District of Columbia Inventory of Historic Sites on March 3, 1979. The memorial is also designated a contributing property to the Pennsylvania Avenue National Historic Site, established on September 30, 1965. In 1993, the memorial was surveyed by the Smithsonian Institution as part of its Save Outdoor Sculpture! program, and it was deemed "well maintained". The memorial is owned and maintained by the National Park Service (NPS), an operating unit of the United States Department of the Interior.

Protesters, including Anton Chaitkin and Hosea Williams, at the Pike memorial in the 1990s

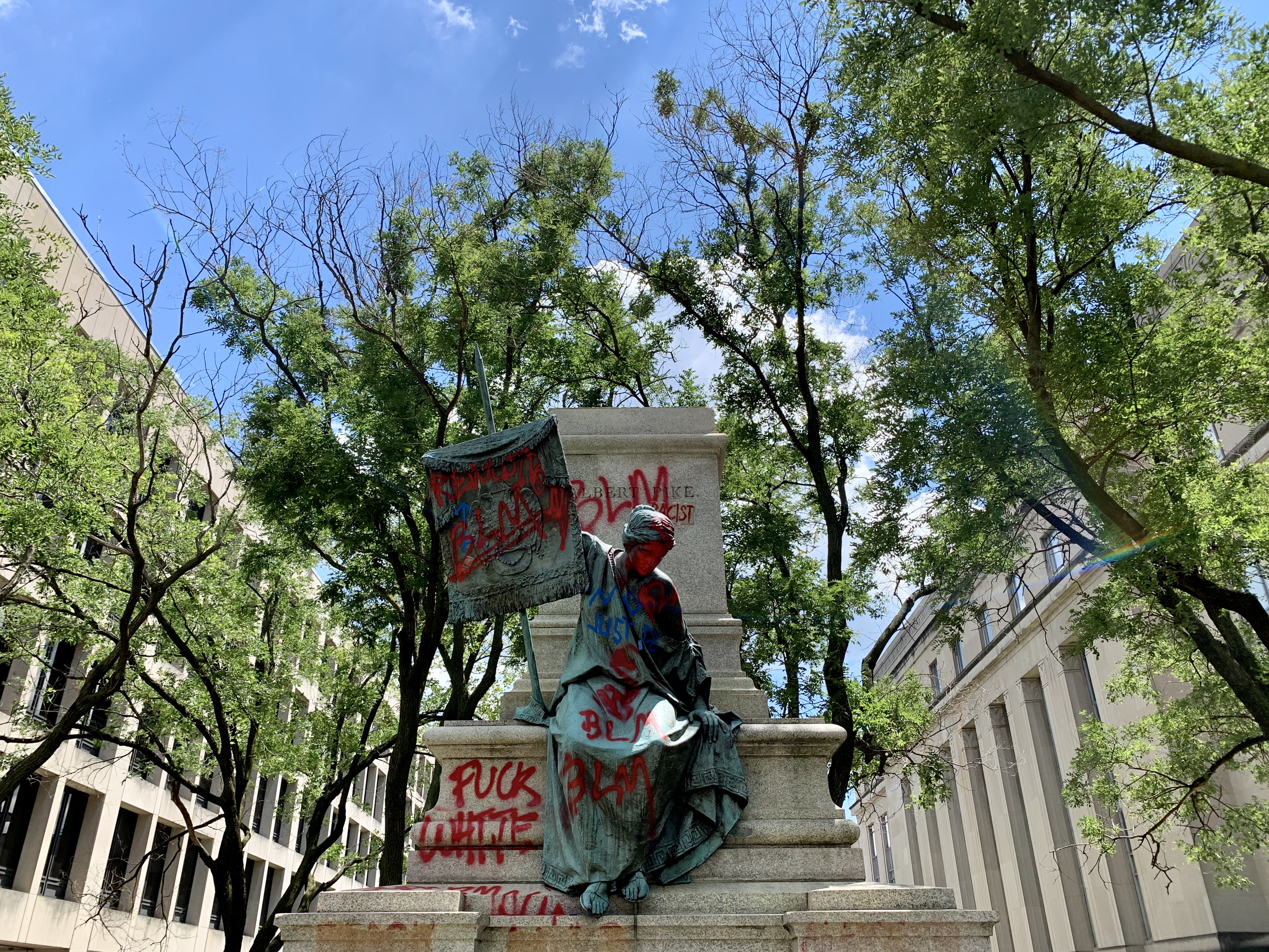
The Pike memorial in 2020 following the George Floyd protests when protesters toppled the statue

Starting in the 1990s, there was renewed interest in removing the statue. In late 1992, members of the LaRouche movement, including civil rights activist and Lyndon LaRouche's vice-presidential candidate James Bevel, began a series of protests demanding the memorial be removed, citing Pike's alleged links with the KKK. During one such event, LaRouche supporters draped Pike's statue with a KKK pointed hat and gown. Bevel stated: "One way or the other, this statue is coming down. Either the statue will be taken down gracefully, or it will be torn down." The protesters sought a congressional resolution to have the statue removed and replaced with a monument inscribed with the Declaration of Independence. Historian and LaRouche activist Anton Chaitkin called the statue a "monument to terrorism" and members of the Council of the District of Columbia petitioned to have the statue removed.

Michael Farquhar, a former writer and editor at The Washington Post, called Pike a "blustering blowhard, a feeble poet, a laughable hypocrite, a shameless jingoist, a notoriously insubordinate military officer, and yes, a bigot with genocidal inclinations". John W. Boettjer, then managing editor of the Scottish Rite Journal, wrote a rebuttal op-ed in The Washington Post in defense of the memorial and pointed out that only an Act of Congress could result in the statue's removal. Boettjer stated: "[Pike] received a full pardon from the federal government for his service in the Civil War as a Confederate general. There is not a jot of reliable proof that Albert Pike was ever a member, much less an officer, of the Klan." He also claimed a LaRouche video promised the Middle East conflict would be solved and World War III averted if the statue was removed. In December 1992, the Washington, D.C., city council passed a resolution, sponsored by Charles Urdy, asking for the statue to be removed. The weekly protests by LaRouche supporters continued into 1993. That year Bevel and Chaitkin were convicted of "unlawful statue climbing" and sentenced to one week in jail.

There was continued criticism of the memorial in the 1990s and 21st century. John F. Doyle, a retired judge of the Superior Court of the District of Columbia, said Pike was responsible for Native American casualties during the Civil War and their subsequent loss of land. Journalist and author Richard G. Zimmerman called Pike's statue a "poor choice for a pedestal" and said inscriptions on the memorial noting Pike's virtues should include "bigot, indicted traitor, alleged barbarian, suspected plagiarist, jailbird". C. Fred Kleinknecht, then chief executive officer of the Scottish Rite, defended Pike and said the statue was not in honor of his role as a Confederate general but as an "advocate for Native Americans and his role as a champion of educational and social reform and for his literary accomplishments and scholarship." Scottish Rite Journal managing editor S. Brent Morris has also defended the memorial and Pike's role as a Confederate officer: "We're not embarrassed in the least that he was a Confederate general...Even in 1901, I don't think the United States Congress would have approved honoring a Confederate general, so he was honored for all his other accomplishments."

Following the 2017 Unite the Right rally, there was renewed interest in many cities and states to remove Confederate statues and memorials from public land. The day after the rally, protesters gathered at the Pike memorial and chanted "tear it down", and during another protest, it was vandalized when someone threw red paint on it. Local government officials, including some members of the council, Attorney General for the District of Columbia Karl Racine, and Delegate Eleanor Holmes Norton, asked the NPS to remove the memorial. In July 2019 Norton introduced House bill H.R. 4135 directing that the statue be removed.

=== Damage and subsequent actions ===
On June 19, 2020, after weeks of protests in response to the murder of George Floyd in Minneapolis, protesters using rope and chains toppled the Pike statue, doused it with a flammable liquid and ignited it. After several minutes, local police intervened, extinguished the flames, and left the scene. The following day the National Park Service removed the statue. The pedestal was covered in graffiti but was later cleaned.

Although Norton had been a strong proponent of removing the statue, after its toppling, she clarified: "I would like these statues to be placed in museums, and the history of the statue told so that we don't lose this moment in history. We don't want to obliterate our history. The way to keep that history alive so we can never repeat this kind of history again." In response to the statue being toppled, President Donald Trump tweeted: "The D.C. police are not doing their job as they watch a statue be ripped down & burn. These people should be immediately arrested. A disgrace to our Country!" Because the memorial is in a federal park, it is under the jurisdiction of the NPS and United States Park Police, not the local police.

On July 2, 2020, the United States Department of Justice (DOJ) announced the arrest and charging of a man who had helped destroy the Pike statue. The DOJ's complaint alleged that the man had been captured on video dousing the statue with a flammable liquid, igniting it as it lay on the ground, and using the fire to light a cigarette. However, the charges were later dropped. In 2025, the NPS reinstalled the refurbished Pike statue in keeping with historic preservation laws and executive orders by President Trump.

== Design and location ==
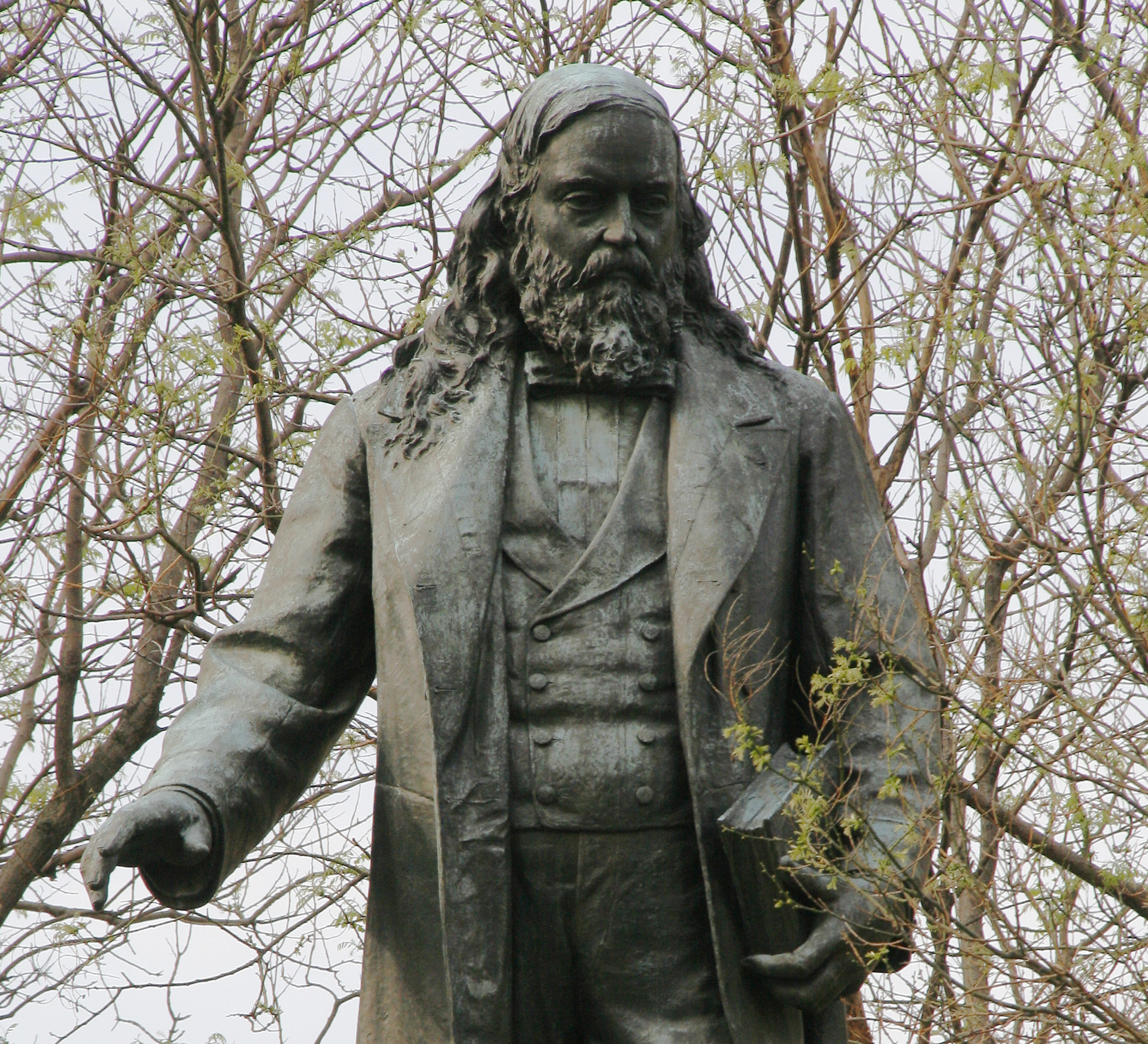
Closeup of the Albert Pike statue

The Pike memorial includes the only outdoor sculpture in Washington, D.C. honoring a Confederate general, although he is dressed as a civilian, not a soldier. The memorial is located in Reservation 188 at the southwest corner of 3rd and D Street NW in the Judiciary Square neighborhood. It is sited between the U.S. Department of Labor's Frances Perkins Building and Metropolitan Police Department headquarters.

The bronze sculpture of Pike measures 11 ft (3.4 m) high. It depicts him as a Masonic leader, not a Confederate officer. He is wearing a double-breasted vest and a long coat. His right arm is extended, and with the left hand, he holds a book, thought to be his work Morals and Dogma of the Ancient and Accepted Scottish Rite of Freemasonry. The sculpture surmounts a granite, Beaux-Arts base that is 17.2 ft (5.2 m) tall and 17.1 ft (5.2 m) wide. On the front of the memorial (north side), a bronze sculpture representing the Goddess of Masonry rests halfway down the base. With her right hand, she holds the banner of the Scottish Rite on a staff. She is wearing a long Greek robe and facing downward, her ankles crossed and feet dangling.

Inscriptions on the memorial include the following:

- G. TRENTANOVE / FLLI GALLI FUSERO (base of Pike's sculpture)
- 33 / DEUS MEUMQUE JUS (on a banner held by Goddess figure)
- ALBERT PIKE (front of upper base)
- Born December 29, 1809. / Died April 2, 1891. (rear of base)
- AUTHOR – VIXIT / LABORUM EJUS SUPERSTITES SUNT FRUCTUS – POET (front of lower base)
- SCHOLAR – SOLDIER (left side of lower base)
- ORATOR – JURIST (right side of lower base)
- PHILANTHROPIST – ERECTED 1901 BY THE SUPREME COUNCIL OF / THE AASR OF FREEMASONRY / FOR THE S J U.S.A. – PHILOSOPHER (rear of lower base)

== See also ==
- List of monuments and memorials removed during the George Floyd protests
- List of public art in Washington, D.C., Ward 6
- Outdoor sculpture in Washington, D.C.
