= Webster Tarpley =

American writer, political activist, and conspiracy theorist

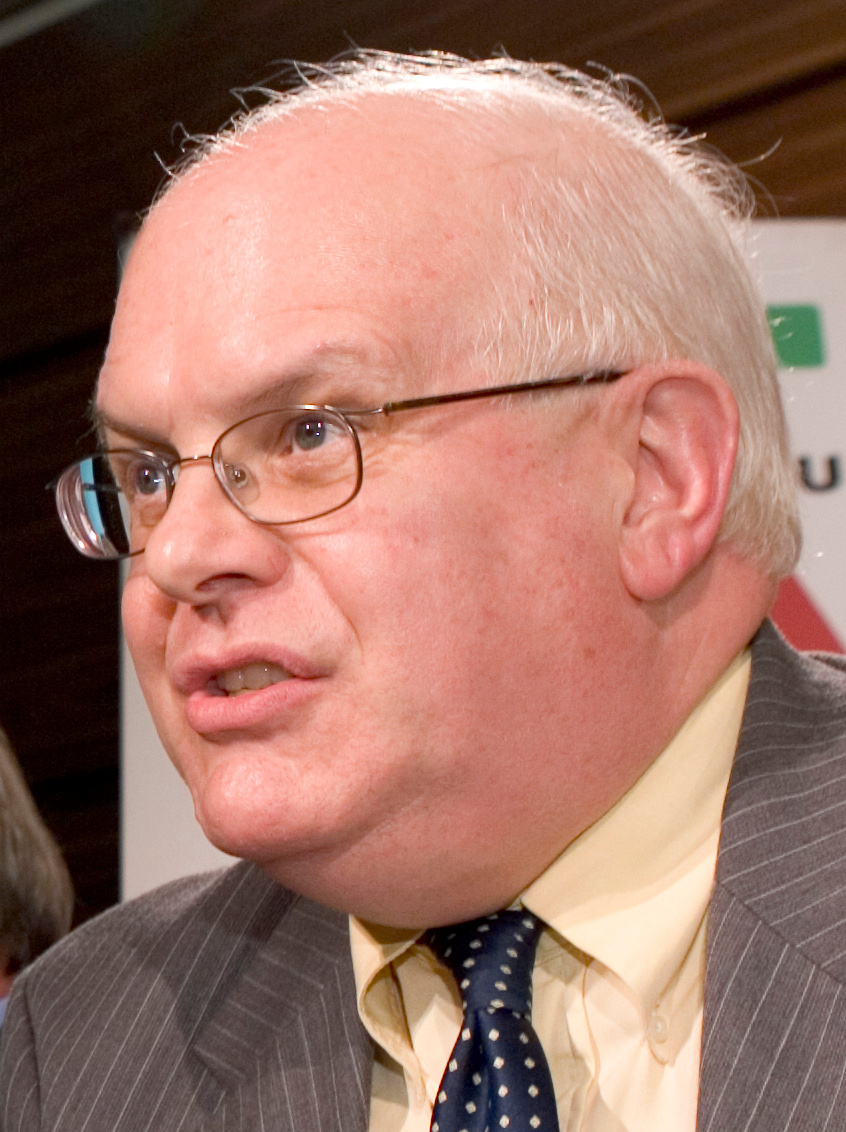
- Tarpley in 2005
- Born: Webster Griffin Tarpley; 1946 (age 79–80); Pittsfield, Massachusetts, United States
- Education: Princeton University; University of Turin; Catholic University of America
- Political party: U.S. Labor Party
- Other political affiliations: National Caucus of Labor Committees
- Movement: LaRouche movement (until 1997); 9/11 truth movement
- Website: tarpley.net

Webster Griffin Tarpley (born September 1946) is an American writer, political activist, and conspiracy theorist. A one-time follower of Lyndon LaRouche, Tarpley is known for his role in the 9/11 truth movement, believing 9/11 was a false flag operation.

== Education ==
Tarpley was born in Pittsfield, Massachusetts, in 1946. After receiving a Bachelor of Arts in Languages from Princeton University in 1966, summa cum laude and Phi Beta Kappa, he became a Fulbright Scholar at the University of Turin, Italy. Later, he earned a Ph.D. in early modern history from the Catholic University of America.

== Career ==
In 1971, Tarpley was on the editorial board of The Campaigner, a National Caucus of Labor Committees' journal, according to its masthead. In 1986, Tarpley attempted to run on Lyndon LaRouche's U.S. Labor Party platform in the New York State Democratic Party primary for the U.S. Senate, but was ruled off the ballot in August that year because of a defect in his nominating petitions.

At one time, Tarpley was a contributing editor to the Executive Intelligence Review (EIR), a LaRouche movement publication. In a January 1987 press conference attended only by a reporter from The Washington Post, he claimed the LaRouche movement's credit card indictments were part of a plot against LaRouche who he described as "the front-runner for the Democratic presidential nomination" in the following year's election. Soviet leader Mikhail Gorbachev, Tarpley claimed, had used a surreptitious message in a speech to demand the silencing of LaRouche because of supposed information in LaRouche's possession on Soviet involvement in the assassination of Olof Palme, the former Swedish prime minister. In 1992, Tarpley co-authored with Anton Chaitkin George Bush: The Unauthorized Biography, published by LaRouche's EIR magazine.

Since March 2006, Tarpley has hosted a weekly online talk show called World Crisis Radio, broadcast by GCNLive.com.

== Conspiracy theories ==
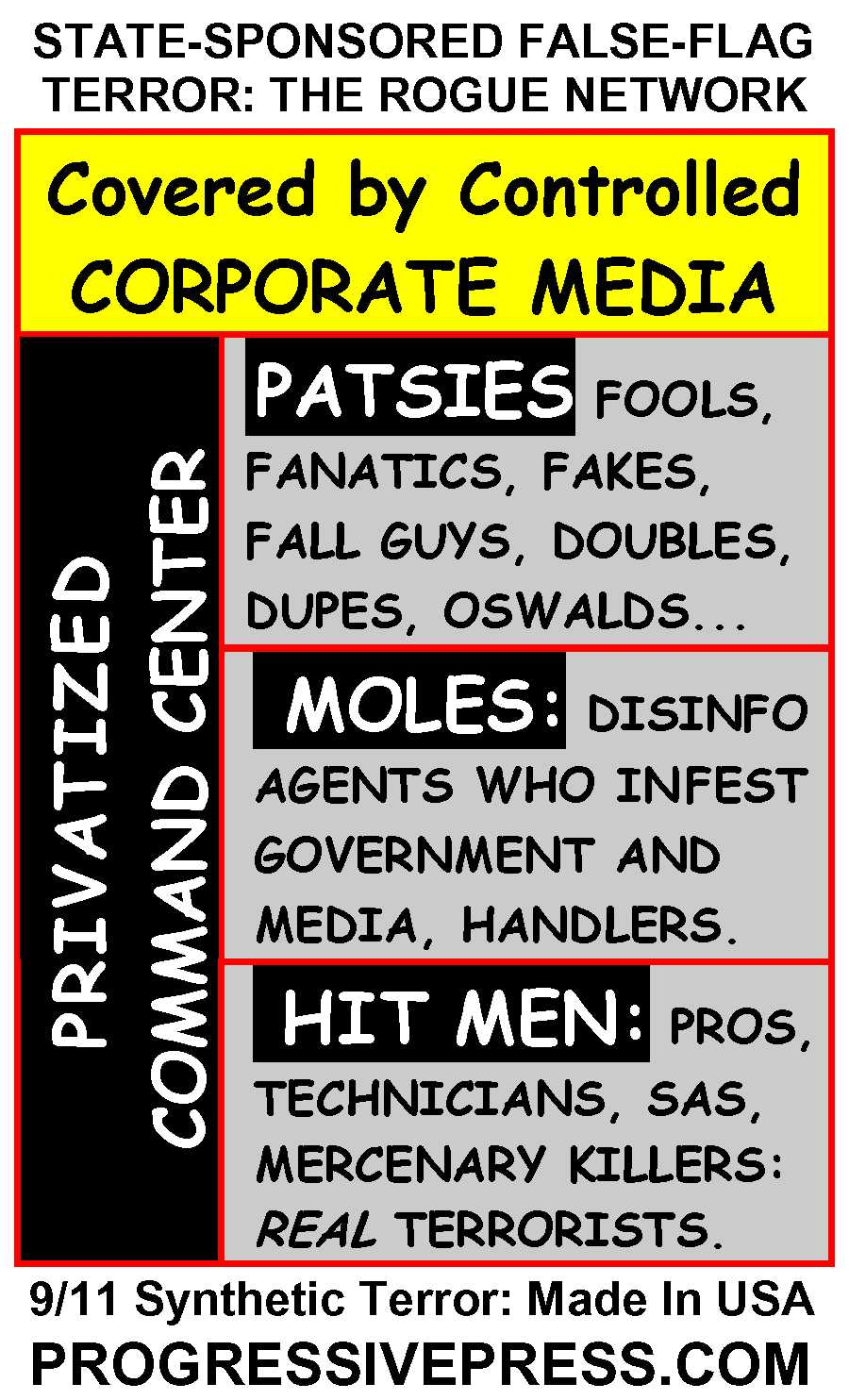
The "rogue network" which Tarpley suspects of the September 11 attacks

Tarpley maintains that the September 11 attacks were engineered by a rogue network of the military-industrial complex and intelligence agencies as a false-flag operation. The common account about the events of 9/11 are in Tarpley's opinion in 2006 an "outrageous myth" and an "absurd fairy tale." The organisations involved in 9/11 apparently included Britain's MI6 as well as "government officials loyal to the invisible government."

On November 21, 2011, while traveling to Syria, Tarpley told Syria's Addounia TV that the Syrian Civil War was a NATO–CIA ploy to destabilize Syria using mercenaries and death squads against the population and the Syrian government.

On April 2, 2012, C-SPAN aired 9/11, False Flags, and Black Ops: An Evening of Debate, in which Tarpley debated his critic Jonathan Kay on conspiracy theories, specifically the truth behind the September 11, 2001, terrorist attacks. David Frum, who served as moderator between the two men, described Tarpley's "presentation as involuted as it was long-winded." During the event, Tarpley said that the Attack on Pearl Harbor was also a government conspiracy.

On June 7, 2012, interviewed for the NRK (Norwegian Broadcasting Corporation) regarding the 2011 Norway attacks, Tarpley said, "I believe that the evidence points to a private network, or even a NATO network, within the police that contributed the long time delay until they stormed the Island."

Tarpley has said Edward Snowden is probably a triple agent ultimately being an agent for the CIA with the aim of weakening President Barack Obama and pushing him into intervening in Syria.

On January 21, 2015, Tarpley was interviewed by Guns and Butter's Bonnie Faulkner about "geopolitical terrorism and the destabilization of governments and how others like Russia and Belarus are responding".

Tarpley is a member of the "world anti-imperialist conference" Axis for Peace, of Scholars for 9/11 Truth and of a research Netzwerk of German 9/11 authors founded in September 2006. Tarpley has also given lectures what he terms the "Versailles thesis", which claims that the British government attempted to create a new "world order" at the Treaty of Versailles.

== Melania Trump libel suit ==
In August 2016, Tarpley was sued for $150 million by Melania Trump, who took issue with his allegations that she had worked as a “high end escort” in the 1990s prior to meeting Donald Trump. Webster lost the first round, then settled in February 2017, paying an “undisclosed sum of money” and making a full retraction and apology. Terms of the settlement included providing a public apology in writing and paying a "substantial sum".

== Selected publications ==
Articles

- "Palmerston's London During the 1850s: A Tour of the Human, Multicultural Zoo." Executive Intelligence Review, vol. 21, no. 16 (Apr. 15, 1994). Full issue.

Books

- Chi ha ucciso Aldo Moro? [Who Killed Aldo Moro?] Study commissioned by the Italian Parliamentary Giuseppe Zamberletti (DC) and published in Rome, 1978. It sheds light on the affiliation between the Red Brigades and the neofascist P2 lodge and the role of the Italian intelligence services in the Operation Gladio/Anglo-American secret services.
- George Bush: The Unauthorized Biography, with Anton Chaitkin (1992); Reprinted (2004). ISBN 0930852923.
- Against Oligarchy: Essays and Speeches, 1970-1996 (1996).
- Surviving the Cataclysm: Your Guide through the Worst Financial Crisis in Human History (1999); updated (2009). ISBN 1615776001, 978-0930852955.
- 9/11 Synthetic Terror: Made in USA – Myth of the 21st Century. Foreword by Thierry Meyssan (2005). ISBN 0930852311; 5th ed.: (Nov. 2011). ISBN 1615771115.
  - Française: La Terreur Fabriquée, Made in USA: 11 Septembre, le mythe du XXIe siècle (Sep. 2006). ISBN 2952557144.
  - Italiano: La Fabbrica del Terrore (Sep. 2007). ISBN 978-8887307566.
  - Español: 11-S, El Falso Terrorismo (Jan. 2008). ISBN 0930852982.
- Obama & The Postmodern Coup: Making of a Manchurian Candidate (Apr. 2008). ISBN 0930852885.
  - German: Barack Obama: Wie ein US-Präsident gemacht wird (Aug. 2008). ISBN 978-3938516744.
  - Japanese: Obama: Dangerous Geometry (Nov. 2008). ISBN 4880862398.
- Barack H. Obama: The Unauthorized Biography (Aug. 2008). ISBN 0930852818.
  - Japanese: (Mar. 2009).
- Just Too Weird: Bishop Romney and the Mormon Takeover of America: Polygamy, Theocracy, and Subversion (Oct. 2012). ISBN 1615777245.
