= George Floyd protests in Washington, D.C. =

2020 civil unrest after the murder of George Floyd

- Part of George Floyd protests and protests against Donald Trump
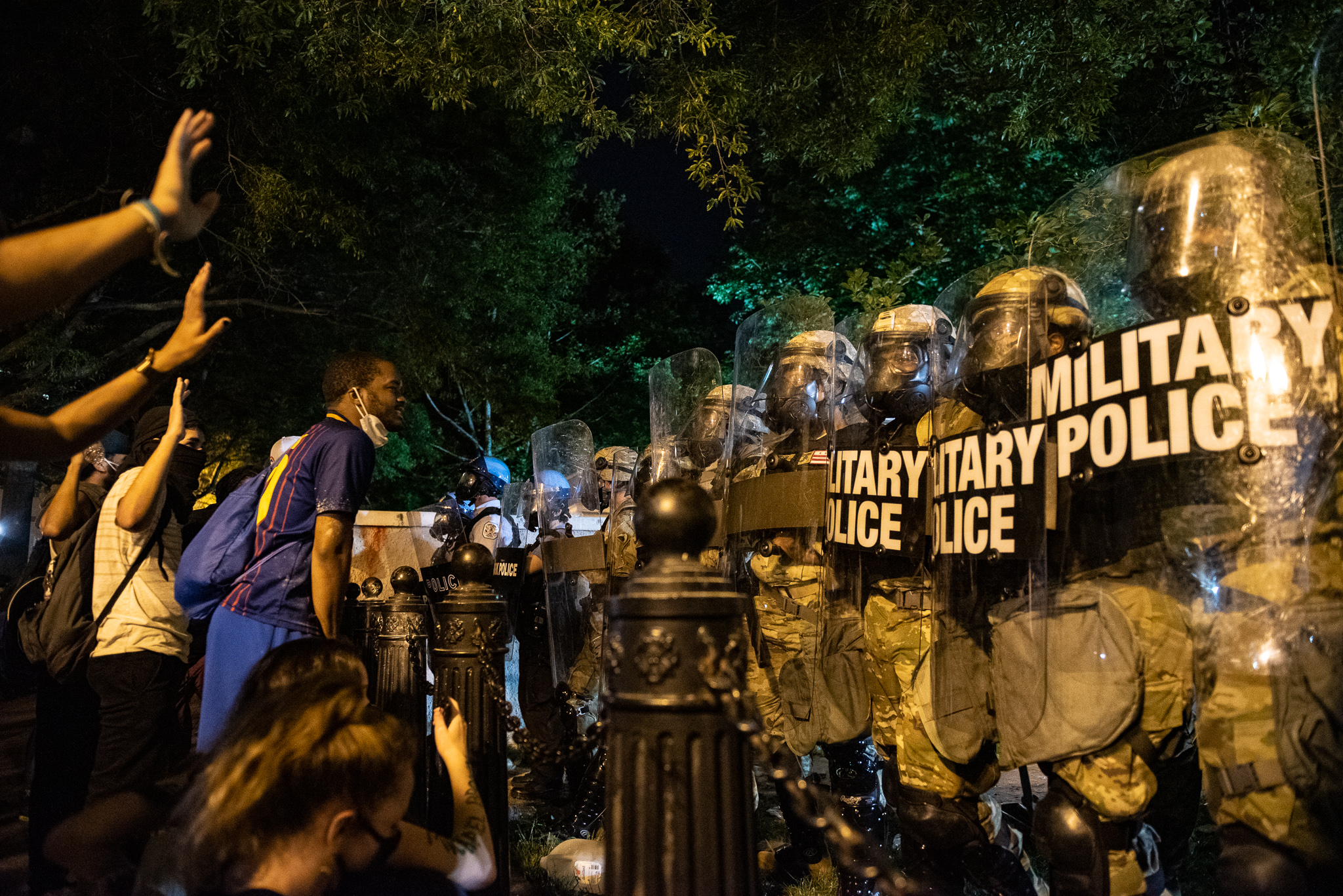
- Protesters confronting riot policemen at Lafayette Square on May 30
- Date: May 29 – June 23, 2020 (3 weeks and 4 days)
- Location: Washington, D.C., United States
- Caused by: Murder of George Floyd; Police brutality in the United States; Racial injustice in the United States
- Goals: Community-controlled policing
- Methods: Civil resistance; Demonstrations; Internet activism; Silent protests; Arson; Online activism; Riots

Washington, D.C., the capital of the United States, experienced a series of protests and riots following the murder of George Floyd in Minneapolis. Some of the events involved violence, looting, and destruction.

== Timeline ==
=== May 29 ===
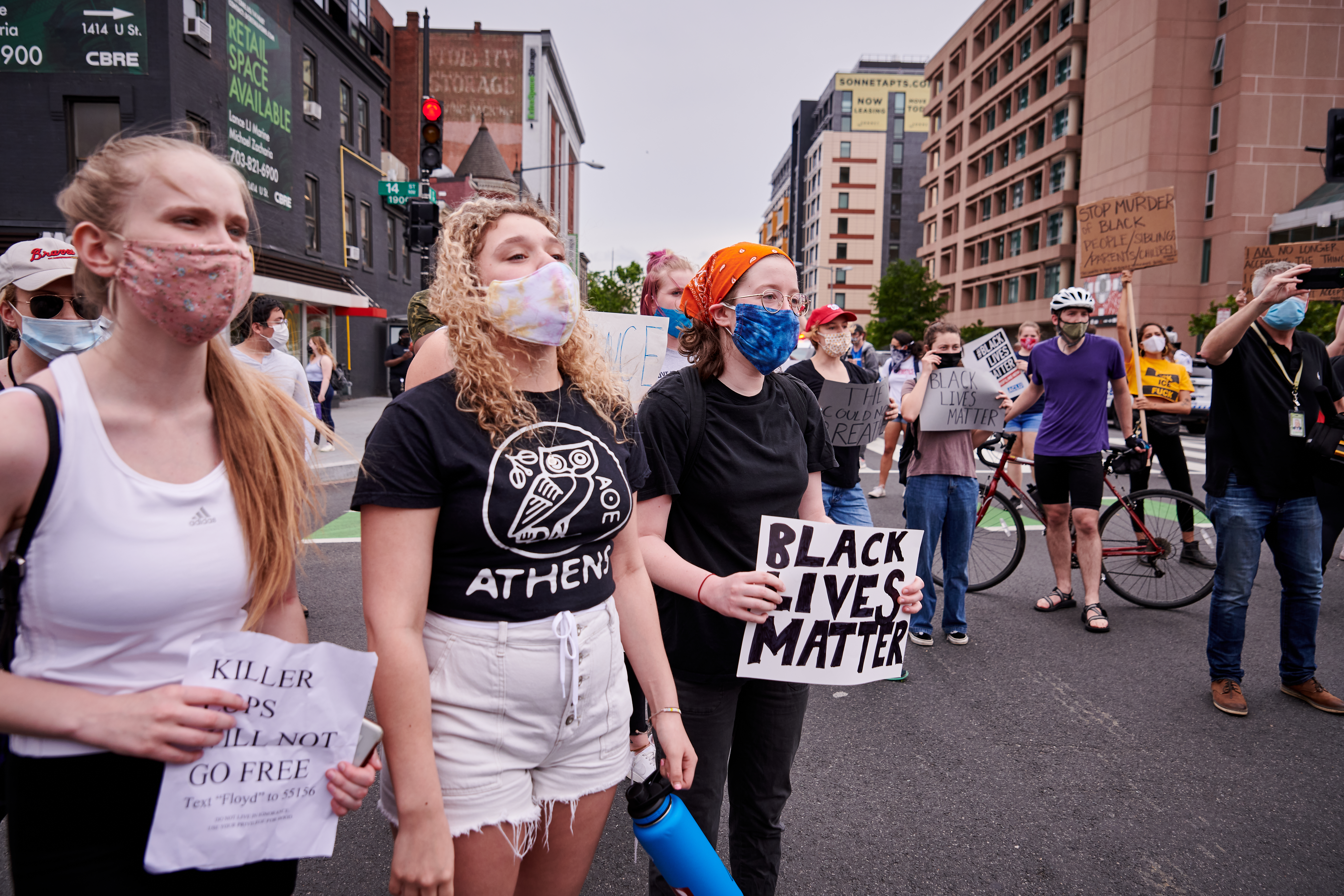
Protest at 14th and U Street NW on May 29

The White House was on lockdown the night of May 29 in response to protests reaching the gates. The protests began at 7:00 p.m. By 8:30 p.m., the White House lockdown was lifted as demonstrators began to leave. At 10:00 p.m., the protesters returned; however, by 3:30 am Saturday, they were more subdued. The protesters came into conflict with the United States Secret Service. At one point the protesters were pepper sprayed. Protesters reportedly threw "rocks, urine and alcohol" at Secret Service agents injuring over 60 of them, including 11 hospitalized and treated for non-life-threatening injuries.

As a result of the protests, the Secret Service rushed President Donald Trump to shelter in the White House underground bunker, where he remained for almost one hour. This occurred after some protesters crossed temporary barricades set up near the Treasury Department buildings. Around that time, the Secret Service alert level was raised to "red". The president's wife and son were also brought to the bunker. Trump later claimed falsely that he had only gone to the bunker for an "inspection", and also claimed that he was in the bunker "for a tiny, little short period of time". Attorney General William Barr later stated that the May 29 protests "were so bad that the Secret Service recommended that the President go down to the bunker".

Trump responded to the White House protesters on Twitter, saying that if they had crossed the White House fence they would have been attacked by "the most vicious dogs, and most ominous weapons". He also stated that "many Secret Service agents [are] just waiting for action", and accused the protesters of being "professionally organized".

The Secret Service reported that six people were arrested in Lafayette Square within President's Park, directly north of the White House. The Metropolitan Police Department and US Park Police were also on the scene.

=== May 30 ===
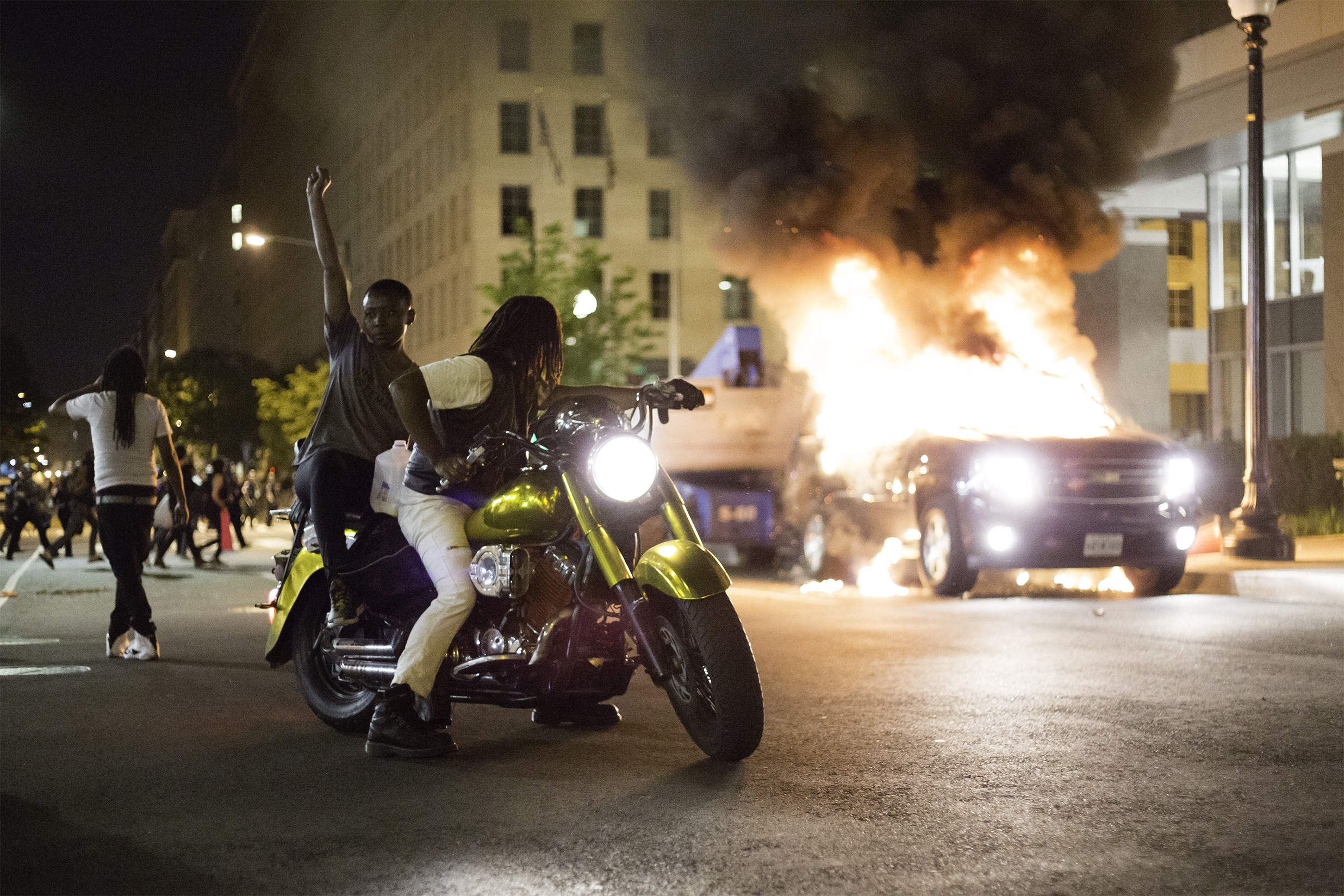
Vehicles on fire, May 30

Protesters gathered around the White House again on May 30. Police vehicles were damaged with one protester graffitiing words disparaging the President. Monuments on the National Mall including the Lincoln Memorial and National World War II Memorial were defaced.

=== May 31 ===
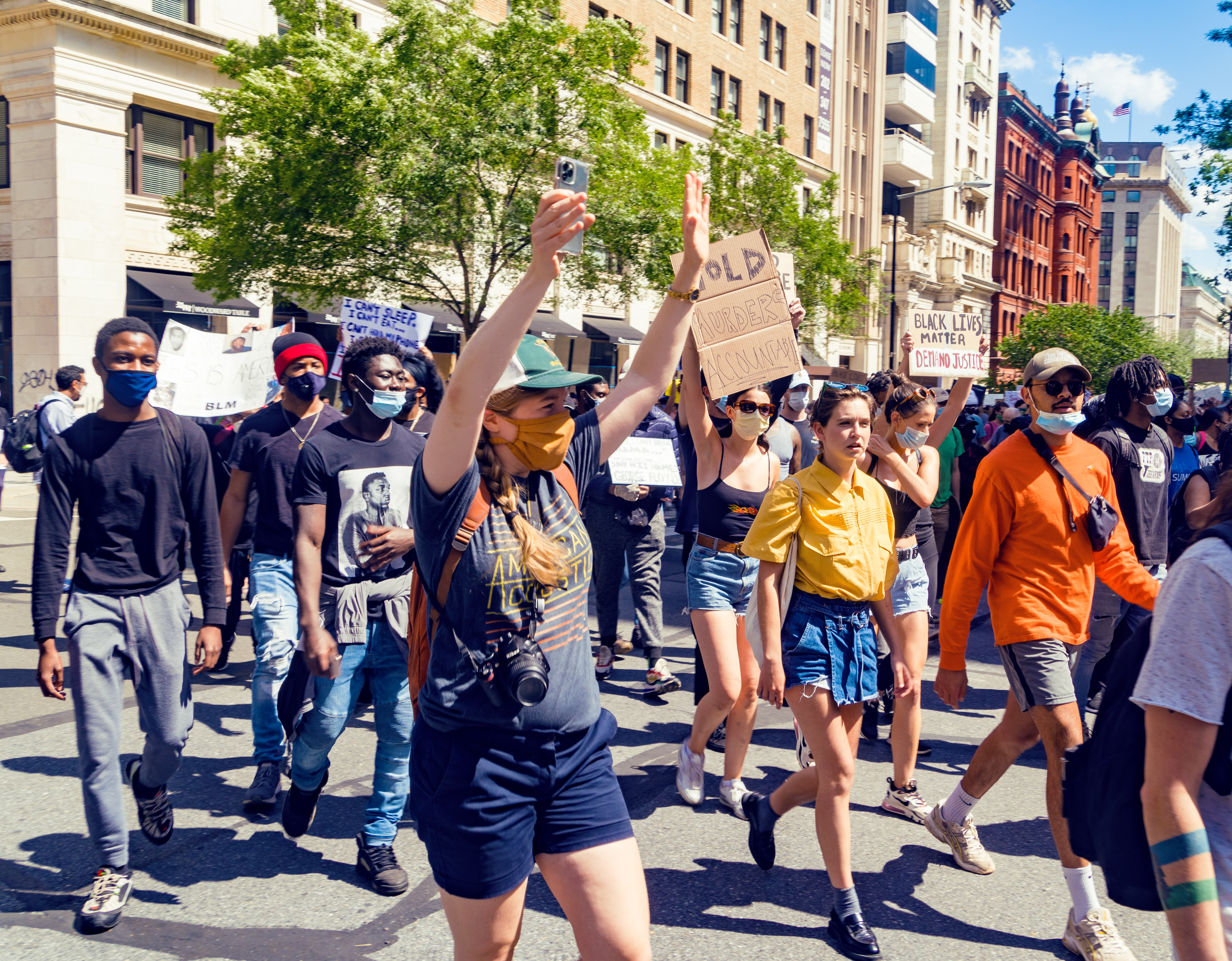
Protest at 15th and I Street NW on May 31

On May 31, dozens of businesses in CityCenter, Georgetown, and Farragut Square were looted.

Washington Mayor Muriel Bowser ordered an 11 p.m. curfew.

Before the curfew went into place multiple arsons occurred including attacks at St. Johns Episcopal Church in Lafayette Square and at the AFL CIO office building.

A BBC cameraman, Peter Murtaugh, was purposely attacked by police outside the White House. Murtaugh filmed a line of police officers charging without warning, whereby a shield-wielding officer tackled Murtaugh to the ground. A fellow BBC journalist said the attack had occurred before a curfew was imposed.

=== June 1 ===
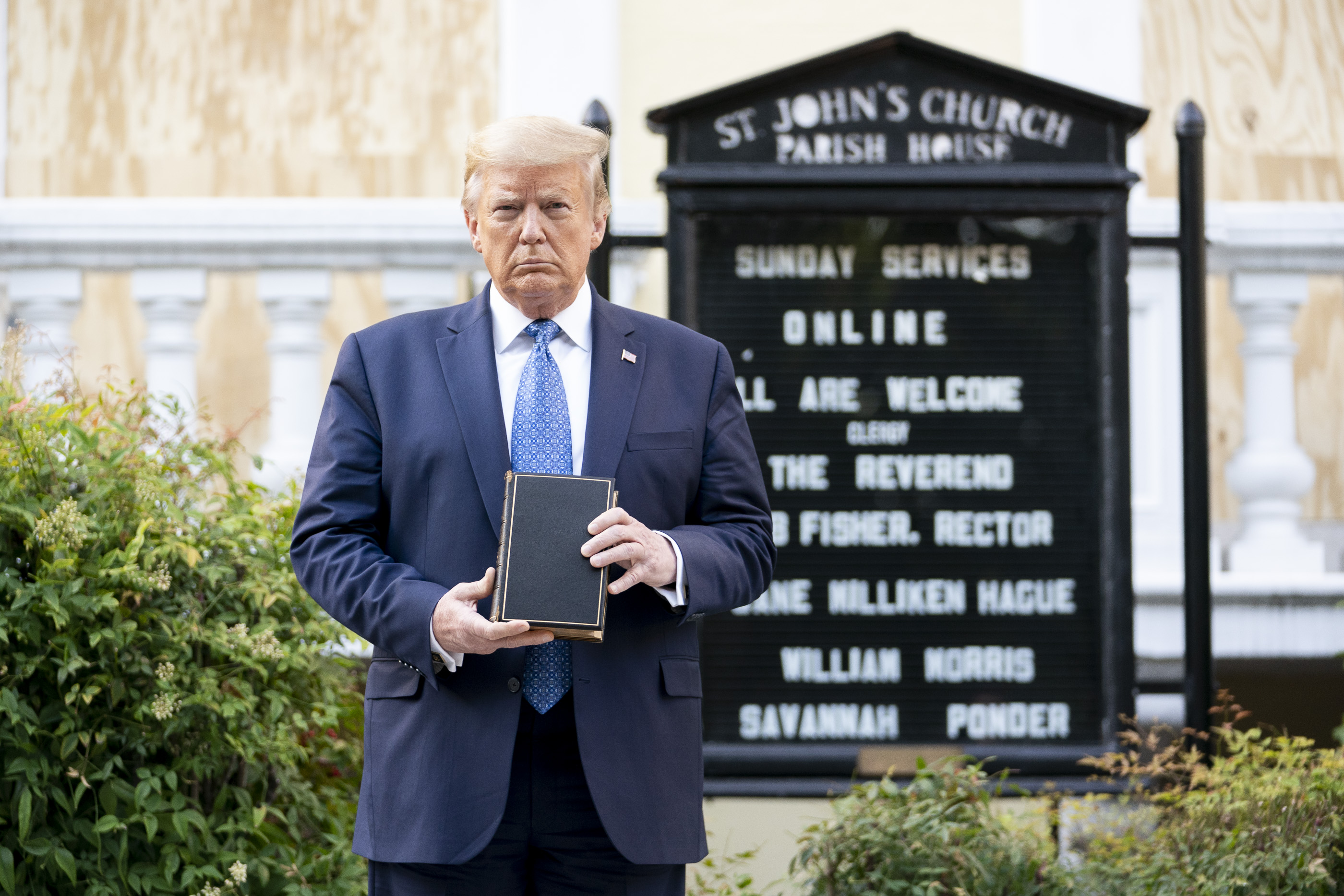
President Donald Trump held a bible in front of St. John's Episcopal Church

In response to violent protests, riots, and arson, Mayor Bowser announced a citywide curfew from 7pm to 6am, which remained in effect through June 3. An additional curfew from 11pm to 6am was added for the night of June 3.

Law enforcement officers used tear gas and other riot control tactics to forcefully clear protesters from Lafayette Square and surrounding streets. Minutes later, President Donald Trump and senior administration officials walked from the White House to St. John's Episcopal Church. Trump held up a Bible and posed for a photo op in front of Ashburton House (the church's parish house), which had been damaged by a fire during riots the night before. The clearing of demonstrators from Lafayette Square was widely condemned as excessive and an affront to the First Amendment right to freedom of assembly.

Local resident Rahul Dubey, was widely praised by protesters after he allowed over seventy of them to spend the night in his row home after being boxed in by police officers. At least one of the protesters inside the home live streamed the incident and the interactions between the police and Dubey after the police refused to leave from his doorstep, and created a large social media following of the story.

=== June 2 ===
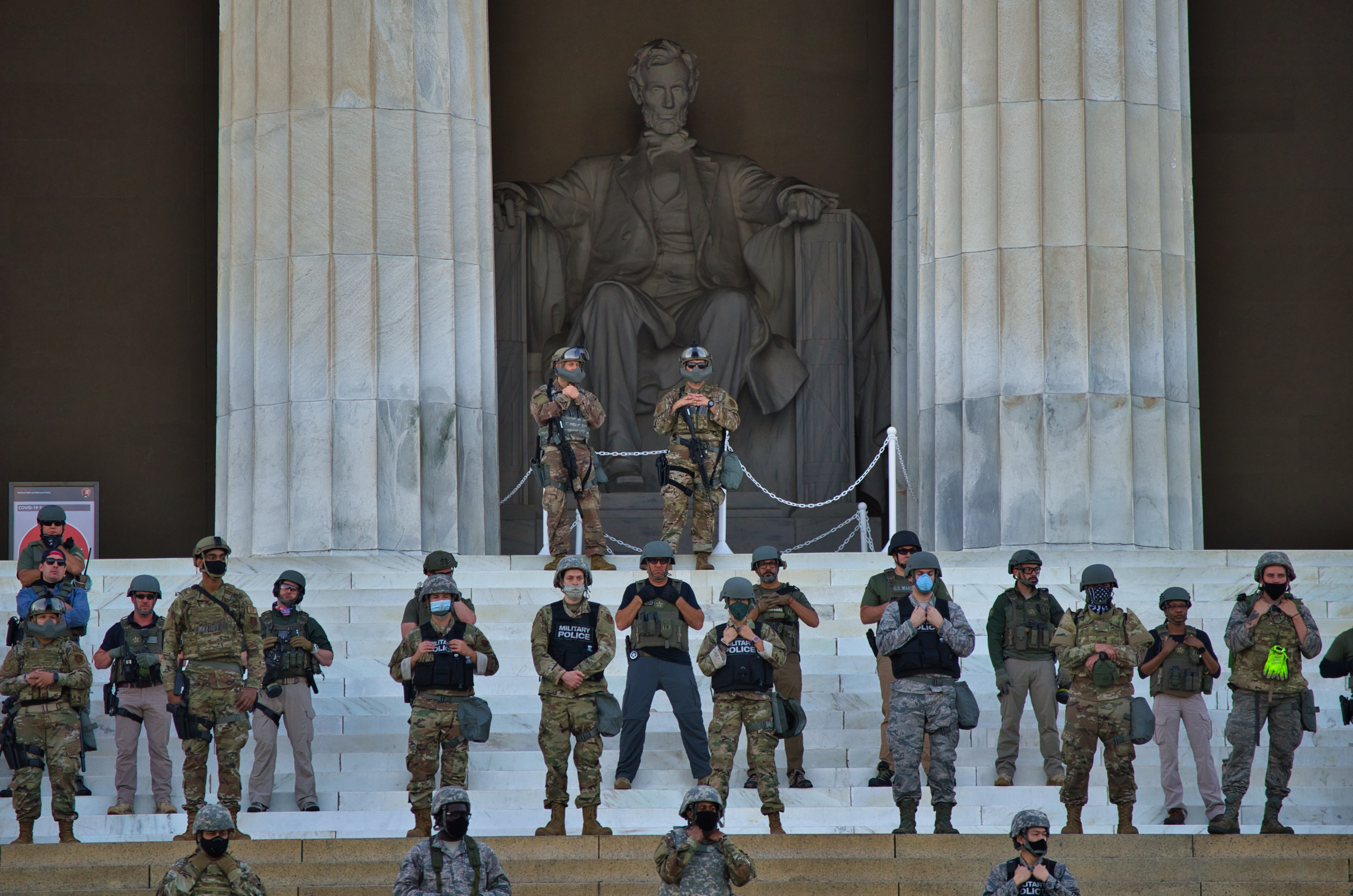
National Guard and U.S. Marshals at the Lincoln Memorial on June 2, 2020

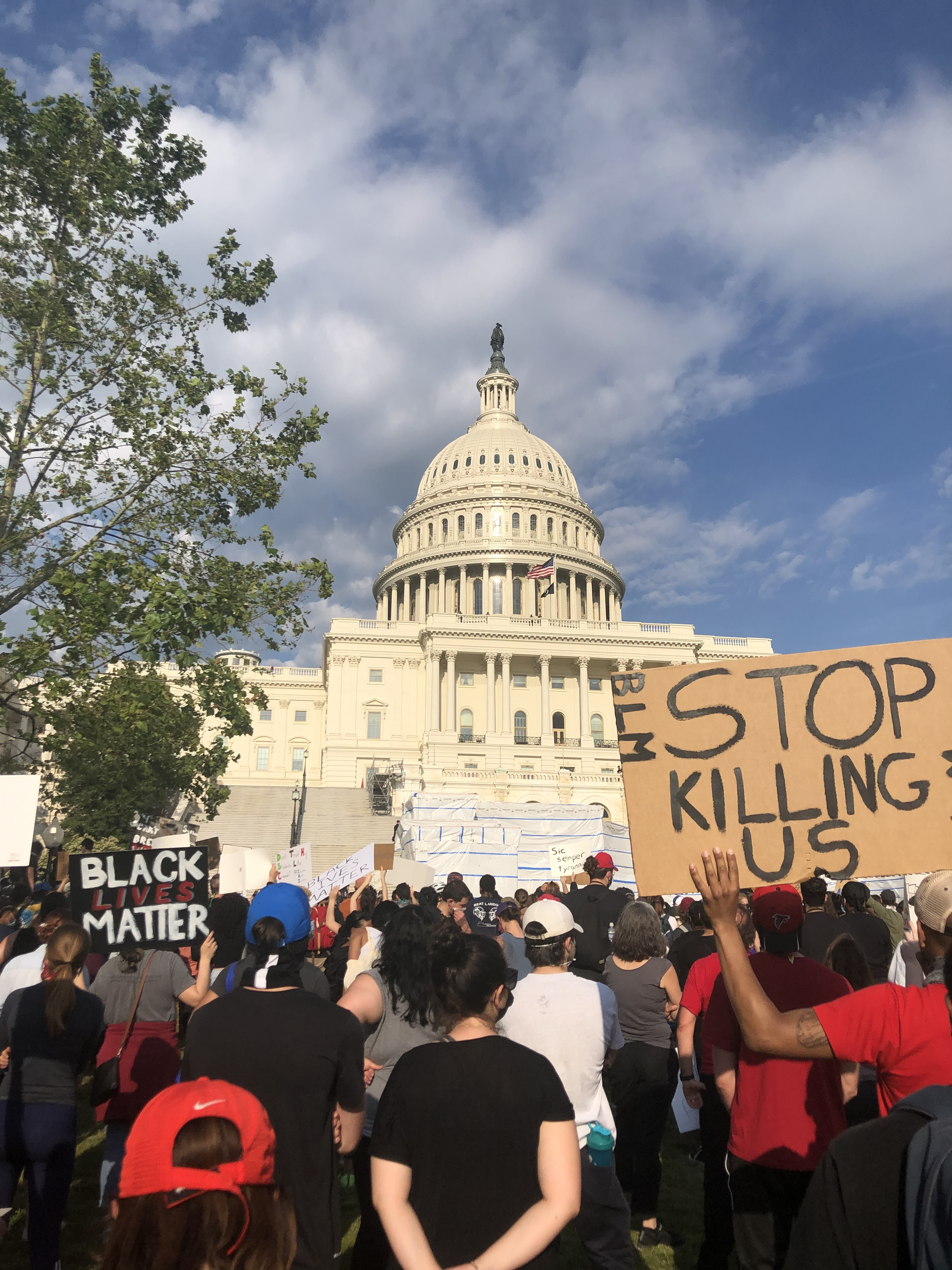
Protest at Capitol Hill on June 2

On Tuesday, up to 2,000 people demonstrated, the largest crowd up to that date. Senator Elizabeth Warren and her husband Bruce H. Mann spoke with protesters. The protests centered on Lafayette Square in front of the White House, and also included a march to the Capitol Building.

The President and First Lady visited Saint John Paul II National Shrine during the day, drawing the condemnation of Archbishop Wilton Daniel Gregory, the head of the Archdiocese of Washington, as well as a crowd of two hundred peaceful protesters nearby.

Overall, federal law enforcement presence was notably increased, which Mayor Muriel Bowser said was not the result of a request by the city. In contrast with previous days, little violence occurred.

=== June 3 ===
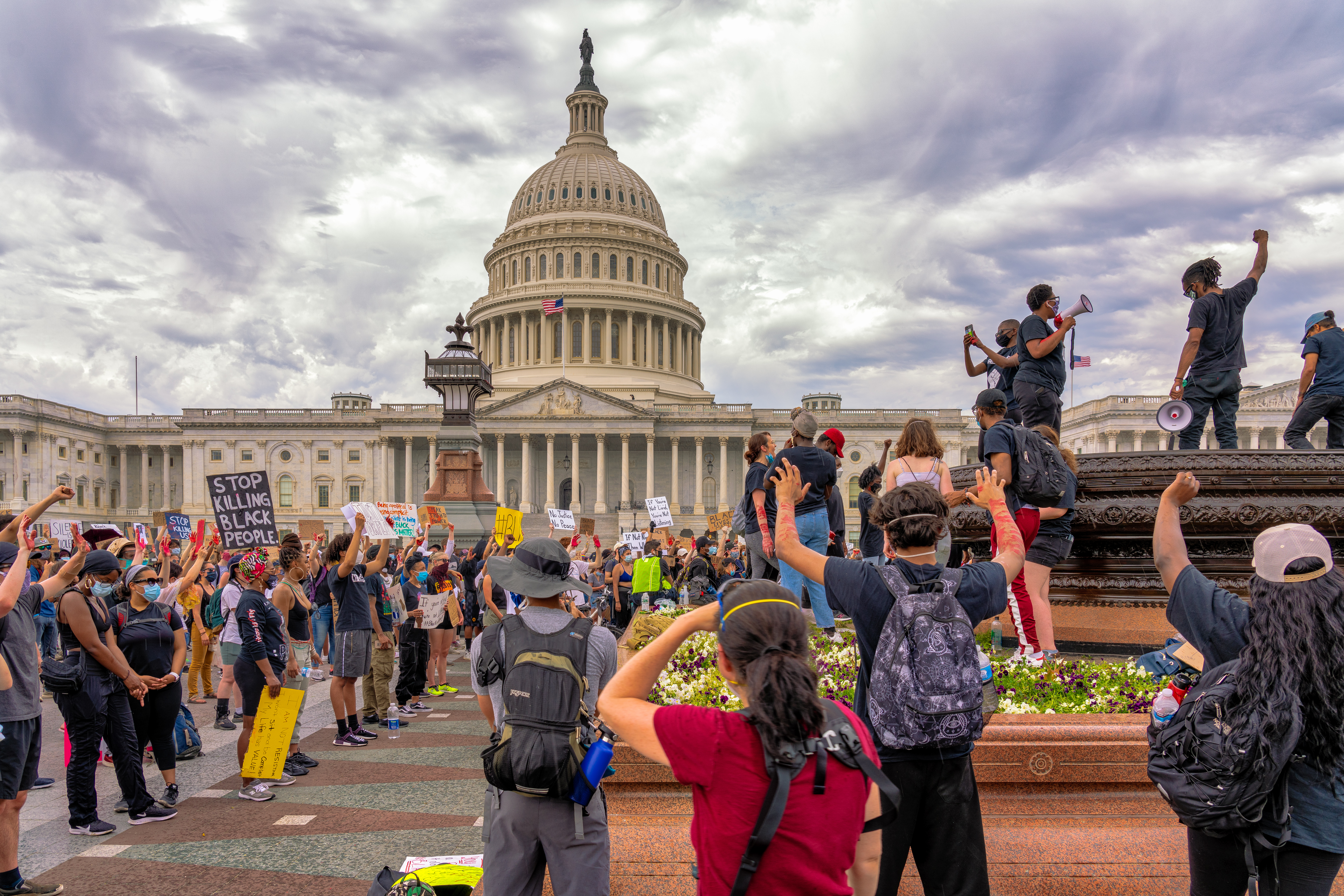
Protest at the United States Capitol on June 3

Over 5,000 were estimated to have taken part in peaceful demonstrations across the city, including those well past curfew into Thursday morning. No arrests were made, and no confrontations with police or damage to police property occurred.

One group of protesters marched a route through the city, with National Guard troops and federal agents monitoring. Barricades had been erected around certain areas of the capital and were maintained by Capitol Police. The names of those who had died in previous police encounters were read aloud, and protesters had demonstrated in front of the Capitol building and the Trump International Hotel. In the evening protesters gathered in Lafayette Park or staged a die-in on Pennsylvania Avenue for about eight minutes chanting, "I can't breathe".

Barr announced that he would "flood the zone" in D.C. by bringing in law enforcement agents from multiple federal agencies. Barr himself was supervising the operation from an FBI command center in Washington's Chinatown. The deployment involved at least 5,800 troops, agents, and officers including personnel from the National Guard, US Secret Service, US Park Police, Federal Bureau of Investigation, Bureau of Alcohol, Tobacco, Firearms and Explosives, Drug Enforcement Administration, US Marshals Service, Bureau of Prisons, Customs and Border Protection, Immigration and Customs Enforcement, the Federal Protective Service and the Transportation Security Administration. The heavily armed officers wore uniforms with no name badges and no insignia to show what agency they worked for, and they refused to answer questions.

=== June 4 ===
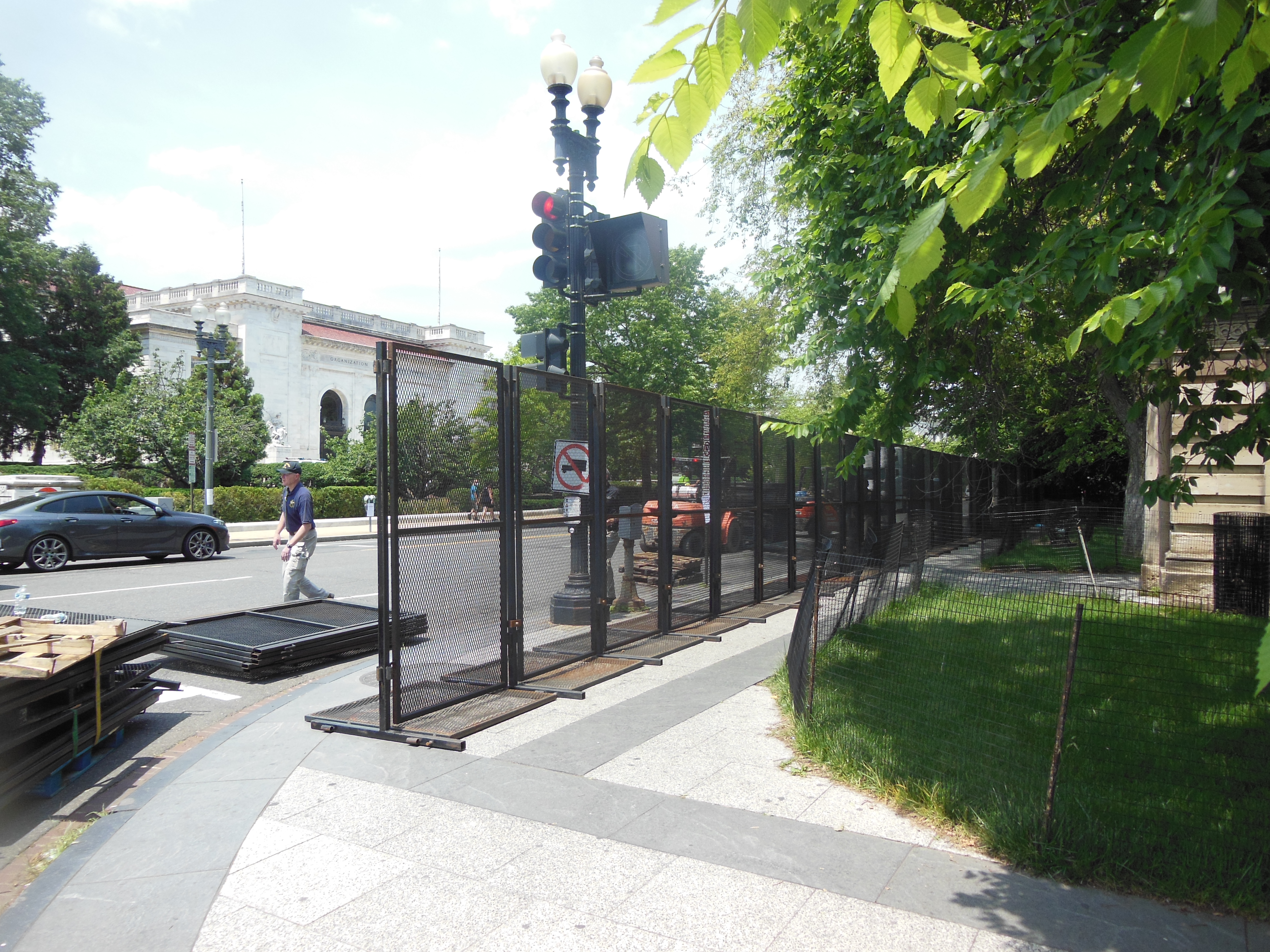
Installation of a fence around Lafayette Park on June 4

Thursday was the first day the municipal government did not impose a curfew since Sunday. Protests on June 4 were peaceful and D.C. police did not make a single arrest.

During the day, several hundred protesters gathered peacefully, kneeling with raised fists at the steps of the Lincoln Memorial, which in previous days had been blocked off by National Guard soldiers. A large die-in was held for over eight minutes at the Martin Luther King Jr. Memorial as well. Around 8pm, a thunderstorm rolled in and dispersed protesters at the White House. Two National Guardsman, non-critically injured by a lightning strike in Lafayette Square shortly after midnight, were the only reported casualties of the protests.

An internal document (“Domestic Unrest—Washington D.C. Overview”) compiled June 4, 2020 for General Mark Milley and the Joint Chiefs of Staff, reports that 7,600 troops or personnel were deployed (5885) in Washington, D.C. or stationed (1,704) nearby. 2,935 National Guard troops, 500 U.S. Capitol Police, 500 Metropolitan Police Department and 500 U.S. Secret Service, 445 Bureau of Prisons staff, 168 U.S. Marshals Service members, 160 Drug Enforcement Administration employees, 80 U.S. Park Police and 32 FBI agents were deployed in Washington, D.C. 1,704 active-duty Army troops were stationed at Andrews Air Force Base, Fort Belvoir and Fort Myer.

=== June 5 ===
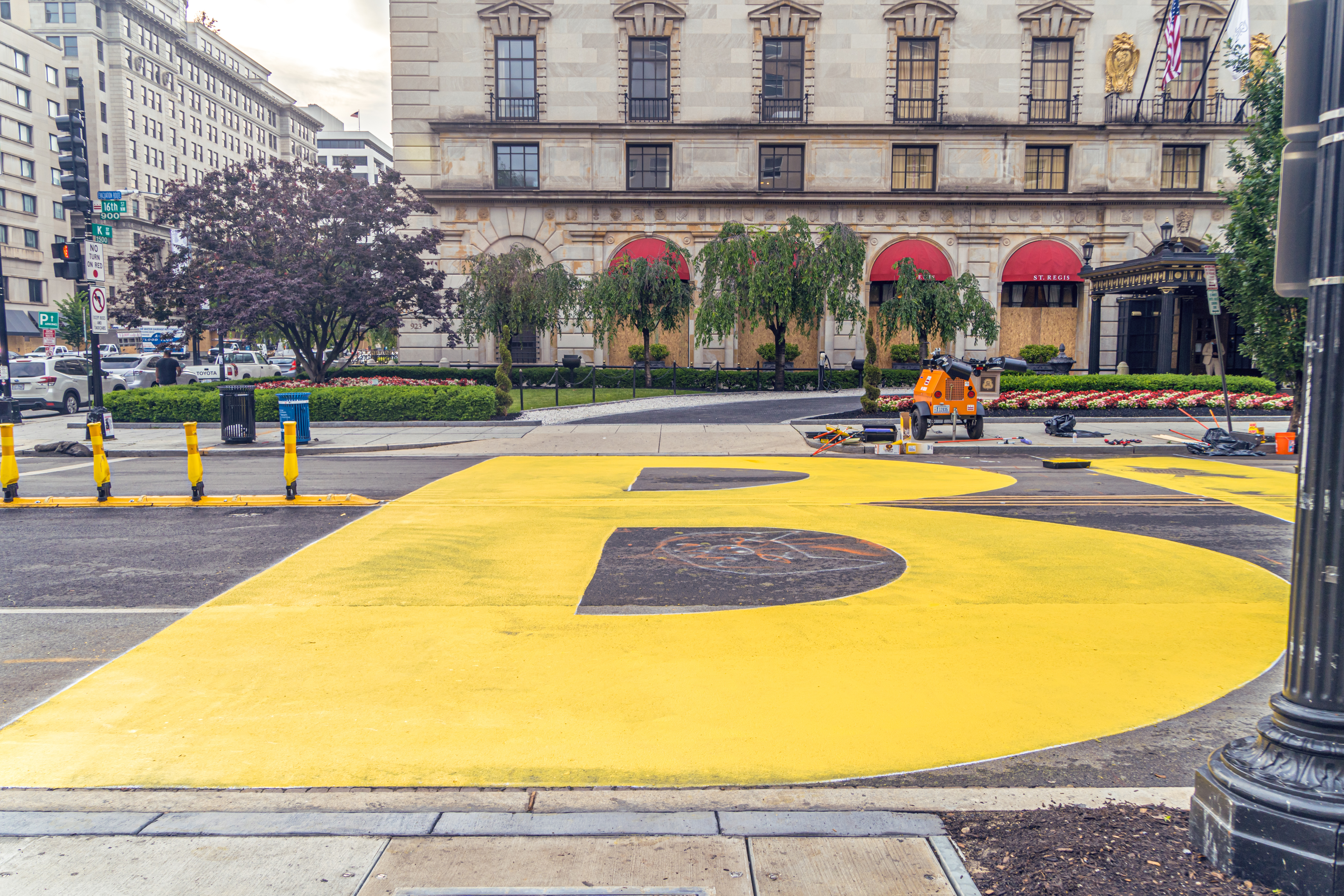
Part of the mural reading "Black Lives Matter" painted on 16th Street NW on June 5

On June 5 muralists painted the words "Black Lives Matter" in 35-foot letters on 16th Street NW leading up to the White House and Lafayette Square with the assistance of the city government, which gave the section of the street the honorary name Black Lives Matter Plaza.

Mayor Bowser asked Trump to "withdraw all extraordinary law enforcement and military presence from Washington, D.C.", noting that protests the night before had been peaceful and she has ended the protest-related state of emergency in the city. The Pentagon later that day announced it was withdrawing 1,600 active-duty troops it had deployed near the city.

=== June 6 ===
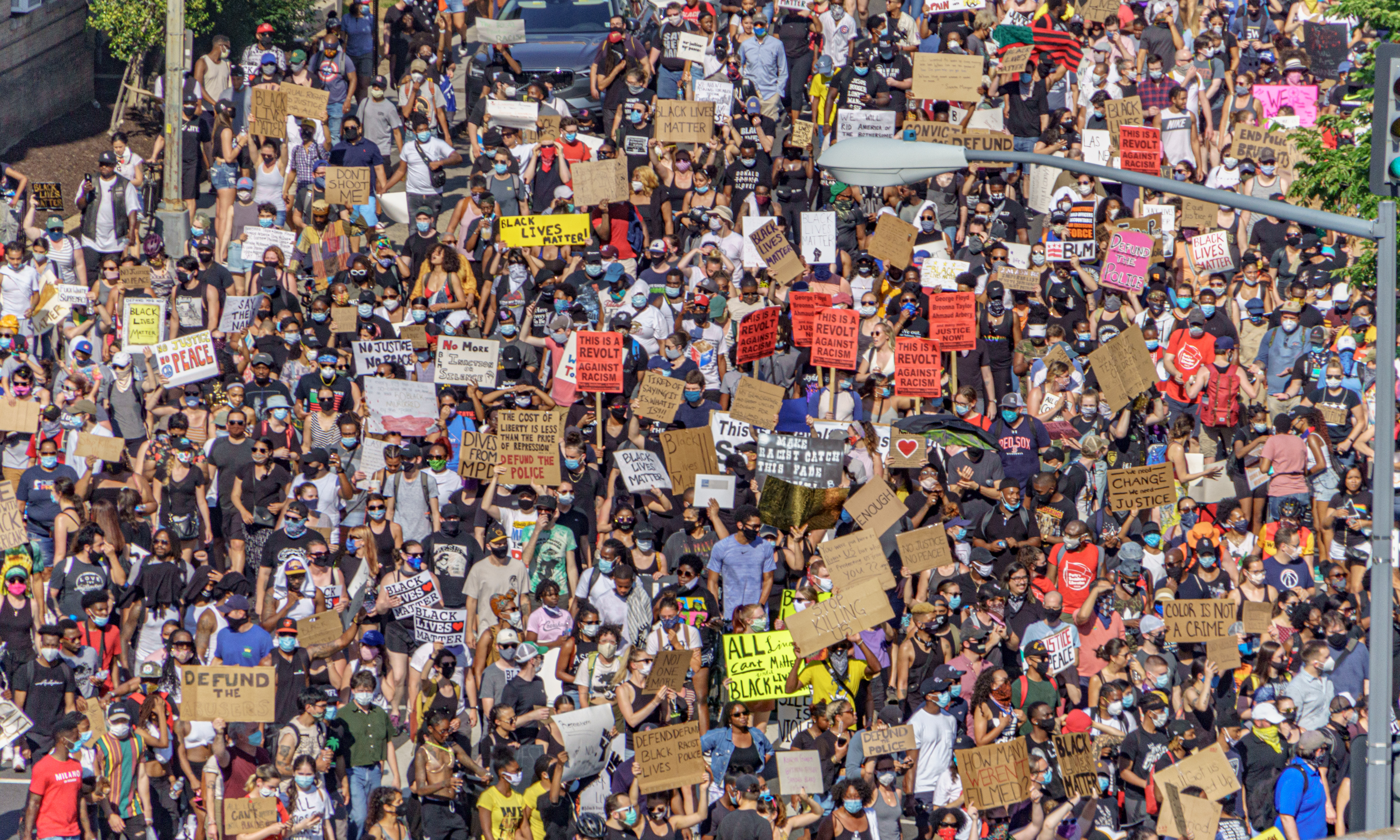
Protesters on June 6

Demonstrations on Saturday featured over 10,000 people, the most of any in the city up to that point. Among the protesters that day were Senators Mitt Romney, Elizabeth Warren, and Representative John Lewis. The largest were centered around the White House, as in previous days, specifically several blocks running up to it on 16th Street. Other gatherings occurred intermittently at various locations, including 14th & U Street, Meridian Hill Park, the Lincoln Memorial, the Capitol Building, Chinatown, and Thomas Circle. Some of these marches subsequently converged on 16th Street.

Law enforcement presence was heavily scaled back, and the atmosphere resembled what some participants characterized as resembling a "block party" or "festival", in sharp contrast to the previous weekend. Some individuals spray-painted "Defund the Police" on the street where "Black Lives Matter" had been painted earlier the previous day, in a move intended to criticize Mayor Bowser, who also spoke at the protests near the White House.

Police reported one arrest, for property damage, related to the protests on the 6th.

=== June 7 ===
Protests continued on Sunday June 7. Protests at the new Black Lives Matter Plaza on 16th Street in front of the White House remained peaceful in the evening. The atmosphere of the protests was described in media as less tense than in previous days. In a tweet, Trump said he had ordered the National Guard to withdraw.

=== June 19 ===
On the night of Juneteenth protesters gathered at the Albert Pike Memorial in Judiciary Square and using ropes and chains toppled the statue of Pike. The statue was set on fire and a few minutes later local police extinguished the flames. The statue was removed the following day by the National Park Service (NPS). In response to the Pike statue being toppled, Trump tweeted: "The D.C. police are not doing their job as they watch a statue be ripped down & burn. These people should be immediately arrested. A disgrace to our Country!" Because the memorial is in a federal park, it is under jurisdiction of the NPS and U.S. Park Police, not the local police.

=== June 23 ===
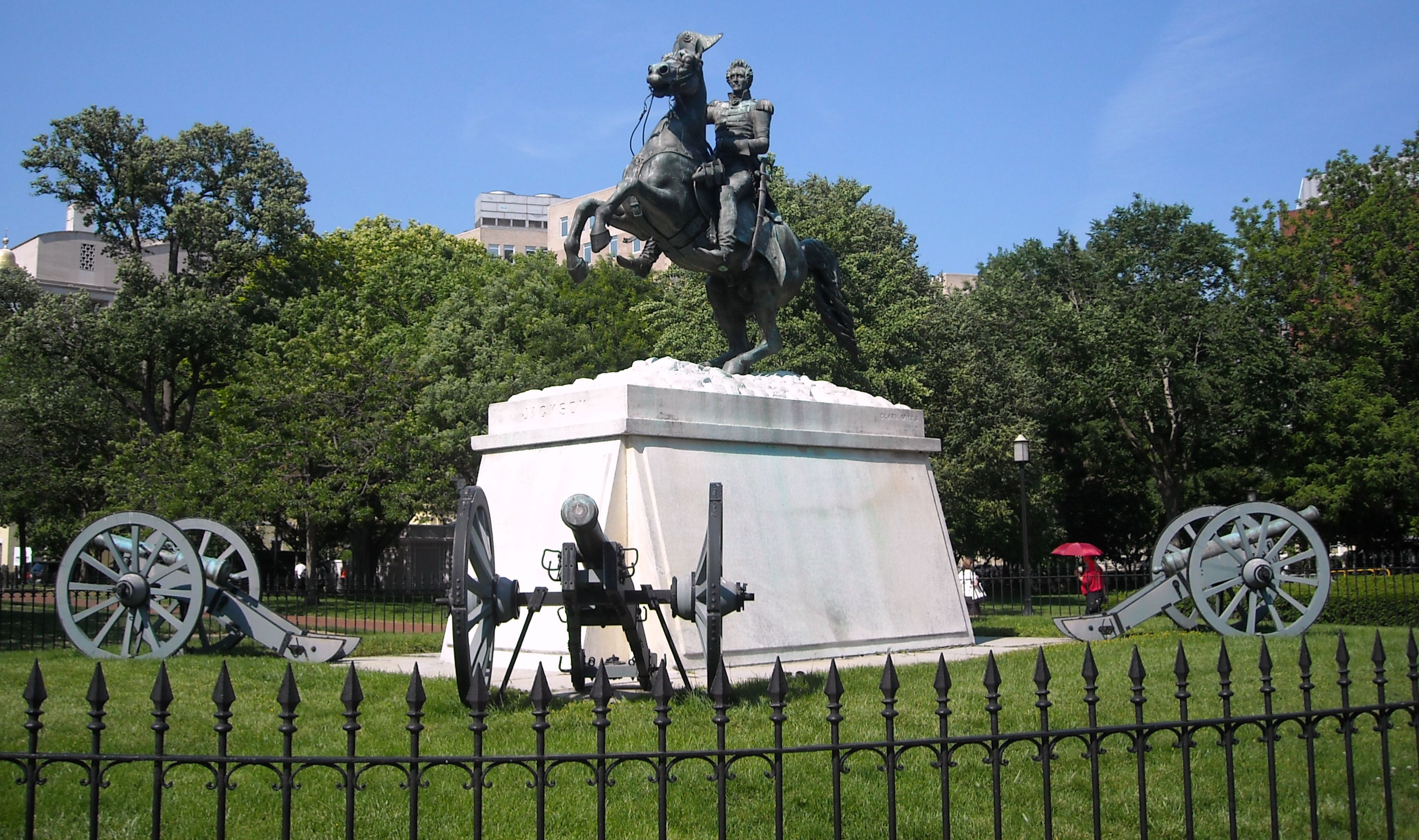
Clark Mills' equestrian statue of Andrew Jackson north of the White House in May 2008.

Hundreds of protesters gathered near Clark Mills' 1842 equestrian statue of Andrew Jackson in Lafayette Square within President's Park. Protesters spray painted "killer" and other phrases on the pedestal. Rioters then affixed ropes to the statue and unsuccessfully attempted to pull it down. Police used batons and pepper spray to disperse the crowd.

Several days later, the United States Department of Justice (DOJ) charged four men with destruction of federal property for allegedly trying to bring down the statue. The Justice Department alleged that a video showed one of the men breaking off and destroying the wheels of the cannons located at the base of the statue as well as pulling on ropes when trying to bring down the statue.

Soon afterwards, the DOJ announced the arrest and charging of a man who was not only allegedly seen on video climbing up onto the Jackson statue and affixing a rope that was then used to try to pull the statue down, but also had on June 20 helped destroy Gaetano Trentanove's 1901 Albert Pike Memorial statue near Washington's Judiciary Square by pulling it from its base and setting it on fire. The DOJ's complaint alleged that the man had been captured on video dousing the federally-owned Pike statue with a flammable liquid, igniting it as it lay on the ground and using the fire to light a cigarette.

== Prominent protesters ==
Numerous former Democratic candidates for the 2020 United States presidential election appeared at the protests. Sen. Elizabeth Warren made an appearance at the protest outside the White House on June 2. Sen. Kamala Harris appeared at Black Lives Matter Plaza on June 5. Congressman John Lewis, the last surviving speaker from the March on Washington who was being treated for Stage 4 pancreatic cancer, visited Black Lives Matter Plaza on June 7, declaring it "very moving".

Senator Mitt Romney was the first known Republican senator to publicly join the protests, attending a rally, and then joining the Faith Works march, on June 7, 2020, from southeast Washington, past the Trump International Hotel, and the Lincoln Memorial Reflecting Pool, stating, "We need many voices against racism and against brutality. We need to stand up and say that black lives matter." His participation echoes his father's participation in the civil rights movement during the 1960s.

== Vandalism ==
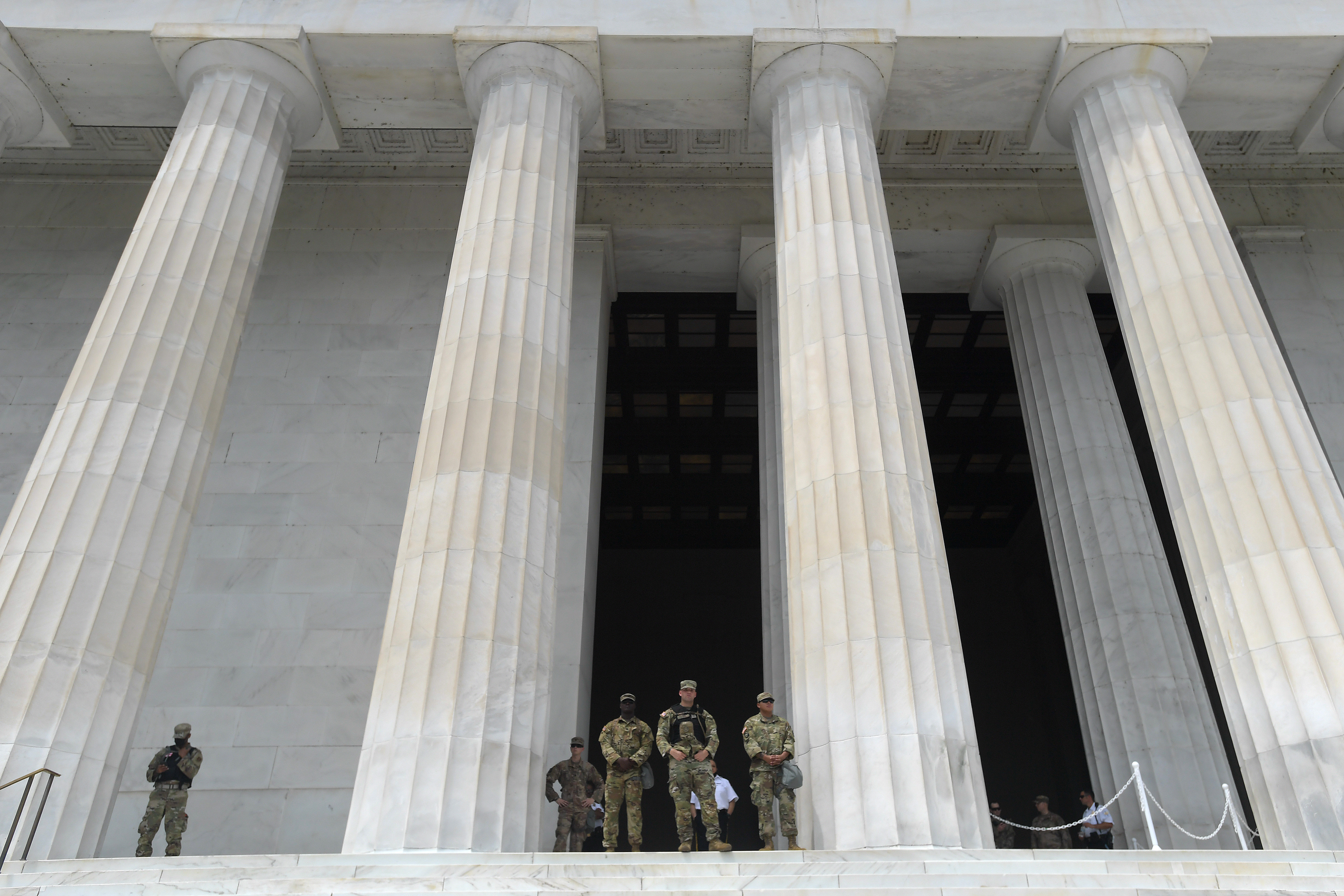
National Guardsmen protecting the Lincoln Memorial on June 6

The Lincoln Memorial, the World War II Memorial, and the statue of General Casimir Pulaski were vandalized during the protests in Washington, D.C.

Unknown individuals vandalized the statue of Mahatma Gandhi, the leader of the Indian independence movement. The incident prompted the Indian Embassy to register a complaint with law enforcement agencies. Taranjit Singh Sandhu, the Indian Ambassador to the United States called the vandalism "a crime against humanity". U.S. President Donald Trump called the defacement of Mahatma Gandhi's statue in D.C. a "disgrace".

== Blackout hoax ==
The #dcblackout hoax was an internet hoax shared by millions or tens of millions during the 2020 George Floyd protests. NPR described the hoax as "well funded and well organized". The hoax described a US government shutdown of all civil communication channels in the District of Columbia and in some cases was accompanied by images of a burning Washington Monument. A disinformation expert at Clemson University hesitated to attribute the campaign to a specific actor but said it was "a classic Russian move". BBC reported "Some of the most shared posts were sent by users who were not based in Washington DC or even in the US." Twitter suspended hundreds of accounts spreading the hashtag.

== 2025 FBI firings ==
In 2020, FBI agents were photographed kneeling in Washington D.C. in response to a request by protestors. After being reassigned in June 2025, sources told the Associated Press that around 20 were fired in September 2025.
