= Julius Lansburgh Furniture Co., Inc. =

Historic building in Washington, D.C., US

- U.S. National Register of Historic Places
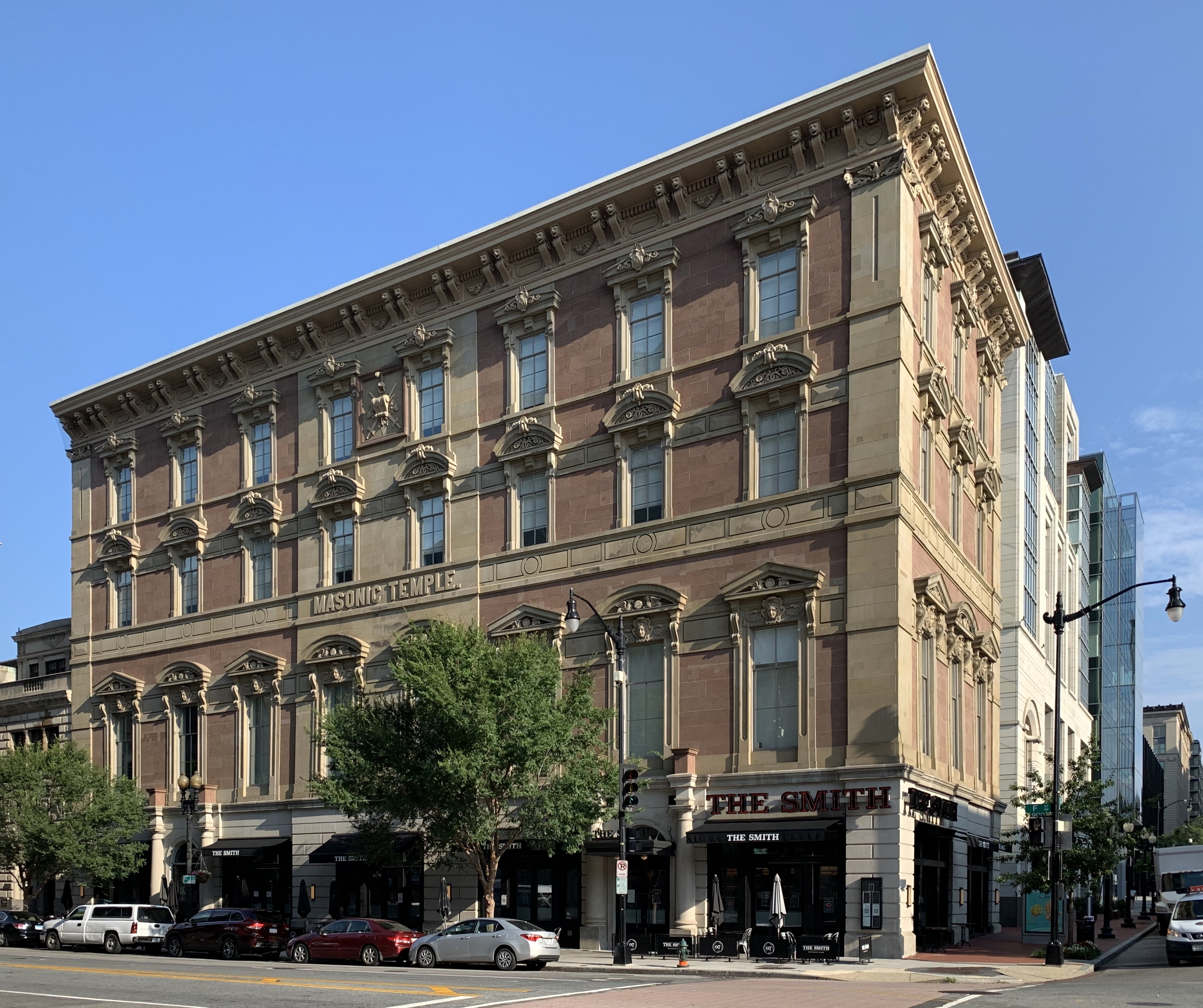
- Old Masonic Temple in 2020

- Location within Central Washington, D.C. Location within the District of Columbia Location within the United States
- Location: 901 F Street, N.W. Washington, D.C.
- Coordinates: 38°53′51.2″N 77°1′27.1″W
- Area: 0.2 acres (0.081 ha)
- Architect: Adolf Cluss, Kammerheuber
- Architectural style: French Renaissance Revival
- NRHP reference No.: 74002164
- Added to NRHP: May 8, 1974

Julius Lansburgh Furniture Co., Inc., also known as the Old Masonic Temple, is an historic building at 901 F Street, Northwest, Washington, D.C., in the Penn Quarter neighborhood.

== History ==
The French Renaissance Revival building was designed by Adolf Cluss, and Joseph Wildrich von Kammerhueber in 1867. Construction began in June 1867; the cornerstone was laid in May 1868, by President Andrew Johnson; it was dedicated on March 20, 1870. The building cost $100,000, but a mansard roof fifth floor, was not completed because of lack of funds. There is a full basement. First-floor stores were leased, and a grand ballroom on the second-floor was rented out.

Julius Lansburgh purchased the Old Masonic Temple in 1921. The building was painted white in 1922, and operated as a furniture store. After Lansburgh's closed in 1970, it was listed as an historic building in 1974. In December 1979, the District of Columbia refused to issue a demolition permit in accordance with its historic preservation law. The building was renovated in 2000, at a cost of $33 million. It serves as the headquarters of the Gallup Organization.
