= Anton Chaitkin =

American writer, historian, and LaRouchist activist

- Born: 1943 (age 82–83)
- Occupations: writer and historian
- Known for: original writings on American political and economic history
- Website: www.antonchaitkin.com

Anton "Tony" Chaitkin (born 1943) is an author, historian, and a former political activist with the LaRouche movement. He served as History Editor for Executive Intelligence Review.

Chaitkin's father was Jacob Chaitkin, who was the legal counsel and strategist for the boycott against Nazi Germany carried on by the American Jewish Congress in the 1930s.

== Activism ==
Chaitkin became a founding member of the LaRouche movement in the mid-1960s.

In 1973, Chaitkin was a candidate for Mayor of New York City, on the U.S. Labor Party ticket. He also ran for Governor of New York in 1974, and for Pennsylvania's 2nd congressional district in 1978.

Chaitkin was among ten NCLC members arrested for participating in a melee at a Newark city council meeting. The group was asserting, among other things, that two local political figures, activist and poet/playwright Imamu Imir Baraka (earlier known as LeRoi Jones) and Anthony Imperiale were tools of the CIA. On October 18, 1973, Chaitkin was forcibly removed from a press conference for asking a question of former Attny. General Ramsey Clark. In 1990, Ramsey Clark became LaRouche's lawyer on appeal, and said the following, in a letter to then Attny. General Janet Reno, regarding the case against LaRouche:

I bring this matter to you directly, because I believe it involves a broader range of deliberate and systematic misconduct and abuse of power over a longer period of time in an effort to destroy a political movement and leader, than any other federal prosecution in my time or to my knowledge.

Chaitkin was arrested for disorderly conduct and criminal trespass on April 21, 1975, for trying to sneak into a conference of mayors posing as an accredited journalist.

He was quoted in the movement's New Solidarity speaking about "Operation Mop Up", saying "many CPers [Communist Party members] have been sent to hospital after jumping Labor Committee members in the CP's own meetings."

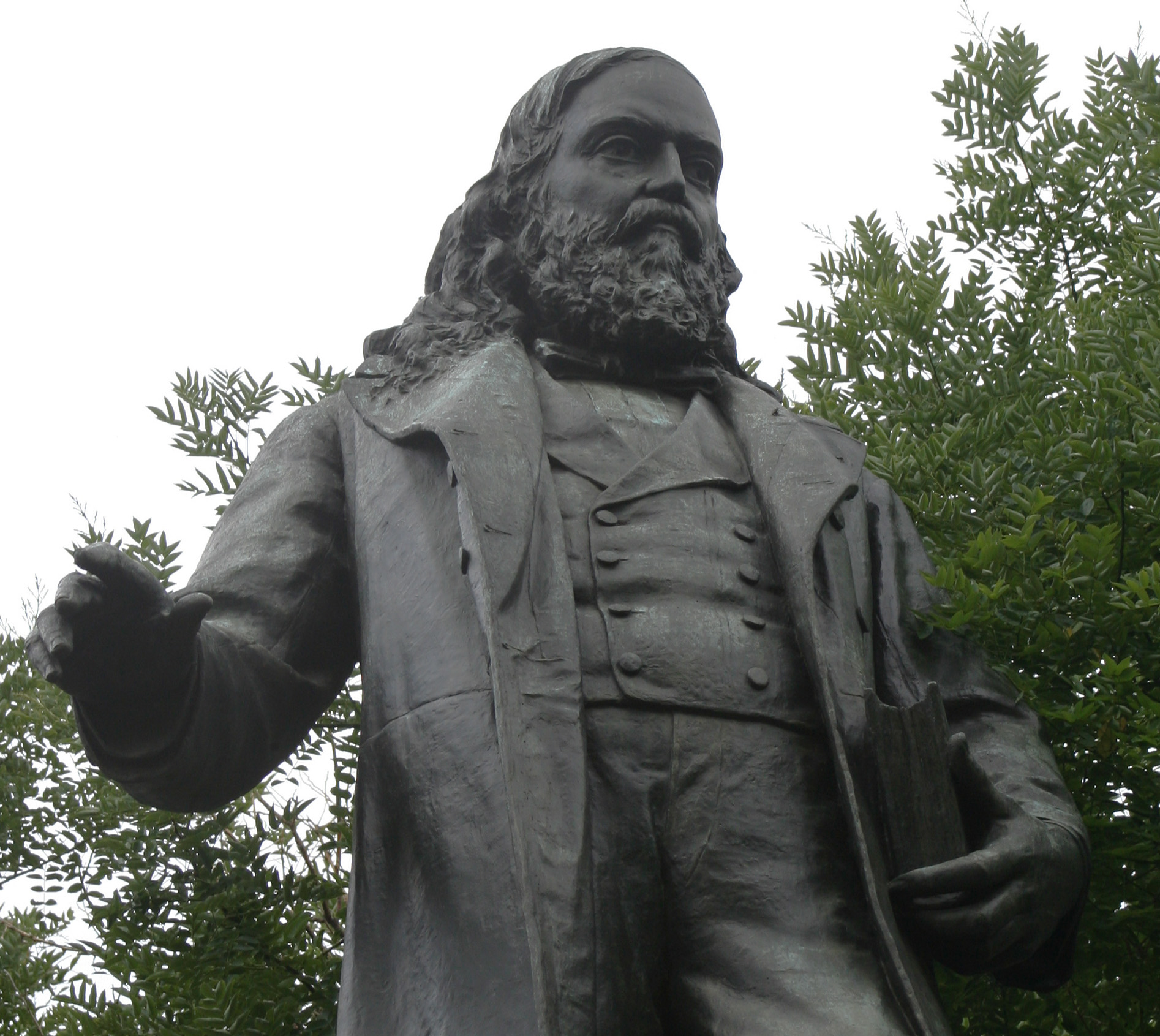
Albert Pike Memorial in Washington, D.C.

During the 1990s, Chaitkin helped to lead a campaign that called for the removal of the Albert Pike Memorial from federal property in Judiciary Square, located in Washington, D.C. Chaitkin charged that Pike was an important founder of the Ku Klux Klan. Chaitkin, along with the Rev. James Bevel, participated in weekly non-violent protests at the site of the statue throughout the 1990s, and was arrested in November 1992 by Federal Park Police for "statue climbing."

Chaitkin ushered in the LaRouche movement's campaign against the health care reform proposal of U.S. President Barack Obama. At an open panel session that included Ezekiel Emanuel held June 10, 2009, Chaitkin said:

President Obama has put in place a reform apparatus reviving the euthanasia of Hitler Germany in 1939, that began the genocide there. ... Dr. Ezekiel Emanuel and other avowed cost-cutters on this panel also lead a propaganda movement for euthanasia... They shape public opinion and the medical profession to accept a death culture... to let physicians help kill patients whose medical care is now rapidly being withdrawn in the universal health-care disaster.

In reporting the incident, journalist Max Blumenthal described it as "the opening volley of an orchestrated propaganda campaign designed to link [Emanuel] and the White House's health-care reform proposals to the T-4 mass euthanasia program of Adolph [sic] Hitler."

== Bibliography ==
Articles

- “America’s ‘Young America’ Movement: Slaveholders and the B’nai B’rith”. Executive Intelligence Review, Vol. 21, No. 16, April 15, 1994. Full issue available.
- “Chip Berlet and the Ford Zoo”. Executive Intelligence Review, Vol. 33, No. 24, June 16, 2007. Full issue available.

Book Reviews

- ”Spanning the Species: The Inhuman World of Harriman”. Review of Spanning the Century: The Life of W. Averell Harriman 1891-1986 by Rudy Abramson. Executive Intelligence Review, Vol. 19, No. 45, November 13, 1992. Full Issue available.

Books

- "Who we Are: America's Fight for Universal Progress, from Franklin to Kennedy" Vol. 1: 1750s to 1850s, Anton Chaitkin, 2020
- Treason in America: From Aaron Burr to Averell Harriman. Washington, D.C.: Executive Intelligence Review, 1998. ISBN 9780943235004. 680 pages.

This work argues that the American Revolution was not successfully concluded, because a significant Tory faction has persisted in US politics which is philosophically opposed to the ideas of the Revolution, and has sought to undermine them. According to Chaitkin, this faction has included Wall Street financiers, Boston Brahmins, and Confederate secessionists. Chaitkin describes the book as "a 600-page history of the struggle between the American nationalists and the tory-British-racist-imperialist faction from the Revolution to the Harriman-Dulles years."

- The Unauthorized Biography of George Bush. Co-authored with Webster Tarpley. Executive Intelligence Review.
  - Progressive Press. ISBN 978-0-930852-92-4

An exposé of ties between Prescott Bush and W. Averell Harriman with the Nazi Party of Germany.

- Is Joseph Goebbels on Your Campus?. Lyndon LaRouche PAC, 2006.
- Why the British Kill American Presidents. The New Federalist, 1994.
- The Bottom of Bush's Closet: The Queer Case of Mary Sue Terry. LaRouche for Justice, 1990.
- American Prometheus: Who Made the United States a Great Power?. Schiller Institute, 1986.
- Operation South Carolina and the career of Caleb Cushing: How the Eastern Establishment Ran Southern Secession. New Solidarity, 1983.
