= Michael Billington (activist) =

American politician

Michael O. Billington is an activist in the LaRouche Movement, Asia editor for the Executive Intelligence Review, and author of Reflections of an American Political Prisoner: the Repression and Promise of the LaRouche Movement.

Billington graduated from Trinity College in Hartford, Connecticut in 1967. He then joined the Peace Corps, where he taught Mathematics and Music, first in Guyana, then in Thailand. Upon returning to the U.S. he joined the LaRouche movement in 1972, in the early stages of the movement's history. His wife, Gail, and his brother, Joe, and his sister, Margaret Greenspan, were also members of the movement. Billington's book provides an "insider" look at the history of this highly controversial movement.

Billington ran on the U.S. Labor Party platform for County Executive of Westchester County, New York in 1977, and for New York's 24th congressional district in 1978.

== Trials ==
In the latter part of the 1980s, there were numerous criminal trials of LaRouche movement leaders (see LaRouche criminal trials) that were alleged by LaRouche supporters to be political show trials. Billington was tried and convicted twice, first in Federal court, then in Virginia state court. He served two years of a three-year sentence in the first case, and was then re-tried in the state of Virginia and sentenced to 77 years, of which he served eight before being paroled.

Billington was charged with four counts of conspiracy to commit mail fraud in federal court and was convicted along with six associates. The case was appealed to the U.S. Supreme Court, which let stand the convictions of Billington and his associates. He served two years of a three-year sentence.

Billington was charged in Virginia State court with nine felony counts of "conspiracy to be an unregistered securities broker". Prosecutors charged that Billington solicited 131 loans from 85 people that totaled $1.24 million even though he knew the money would not be repaid. Billington asserted his innocence and refused a plea bargain that would have resulted in being sentenced to the time already served in federal prison. LaRouche reportedly told his followers to become martyrs and promised that "honorable deeds shall be legendary in the tales told to future generations." Brian Gettings, his lawyer (who had previously defended LaRouche associate William Wertz in the 1988 Federal trial involving LaRouche, Wertz, Billington, and four others), told the court that he believed Billington to be incompetent to make decisions on his own, but a court-appointed psychiatrist deemed him competent. The judge requested a second evaluation but Billington refused. Billington tried to have his attorney replaced, and Gettings himself asked to be removed, but the judge refused permission. According to Larouche Movement member Barbara Boyd, Billington's attorney had not prepared a defense, assuming that Billington would "cop a plea," and the judge refused to permit Billington to substitute a different attorney, despite the fact that one stood ready.

At the state trial, held in Roanoke, the prosecutor said that Billington was "ruthless" in his fundraising from old people who "look upon him in such a close and trusting fashion that they would do whatever he asked." His mother testified that he "can talk you into or out of just about anything." Billington reportedly offered high interest rates and promised lenders that the money would be safer than in a bank. The jury convicted Billington on all nine counts and recommended a sentence to 77 years. The judge accepted the jury's recommendation because he had warned he would do so if Billington insisted on a jury trial and because Billington showed no remorse. He served eight years of the sentence before being paroled.

In 1990, his bank accounts, along with those of Laurence Hecht and two LaRouche enterprises, were seized to fulfill a judgment related to $260,000 obtained from an 88-year-old man suffering from dementia under misrepresentations.

=== Commentary on the verdict ===
Because Billington was tried in the Virginia court without a cooperating attorney, because of the novelty of the charge (political loans had never before been considered to be securities) and because of the 77-year sentence for what is normally considered a minor white-collar crime (transformed from a misdemeanor to a felony by the addition of a conspiracy charge), protest was raised against the verdict. Billington and his fellow defendants in the Virginia trials attempted, without success, to have the charges dismissed on various grounds, including:

- that they had already been tried on the same charges in federal court (double jeopardy) and
- that the Virginia State Corporation Counsel did not rule that political loans were "securities" until three months after the defendants were indicted for conspiracy to fail to register as securities brokers.

The Slovak weekly Zmena wrote that "the history of the case of Billington shows that only his crime was the association with Lyndon LaRouche." Billington is mentioned in the book Life After Life by jailed Black Panther Party activist Evans D. Hopkins, where he is described as "a white guy who, it was said, had gotten railroaded on a political charge, his primary offense being that he had been an associate of the political maverick Lyndon LaRouche."

== Later activity ==
During his time in prison, he trained himself to sleep during the day, so that he could study at night, undisturbed by the constant noise of prison life. He taught himself to read and write Chinese and became knowledgeable about the history of Chinese philosophy. He describes his "greatest experience" in prison as being the work he did with co-defendant Paul Gallagher in founding a prisoners' chorus, where prisoners sang classical choral music including the "prisoners' chorus" from the opera Fidelio by Beethoven. After being paroled, he resumed his political activity.

His book, written in prison, was released in 2000. Billington's brother, Joe Billington, has also been a supporter of the LaRouche movement as has their sister, Margaret.

In January 2008, Billington debated London School of Economics Asia expert James Putzel on Iranian television, as part of the English-language Press TV's "Four Corners" program. The topic of the discussion was the insurgency in the southern part of the Philippines, and whether it is a solely indigenous problem, or whether American interests have played a role in creating it.

== Books ==
- Billington, Michael O., Reflections of an American Political Prisoner, published by Executive Intelligence Review, 2000, ISBN 0-943235-17-0
