= Bürgerrechtsbewegung Solidarität =

Civil Rights Movement Solidarity Bürgerrechtsbewegung Solidarität
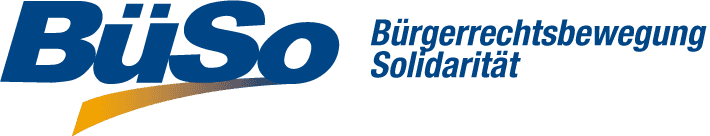
- Chairman: Helga Zepp-LaRouche
- Founded: 1992
- Ideology: LaRouchism
- Political position: Syncretic

Website
- www.bueso.de

Bürgerrechtsbewegung Solidarität (BüSo), or the Civil Rights Movement Solidarity, is a German political party founded by Helga Zepp-LaRouche, the widow of U.S. political activist Lyndon LaRouche.

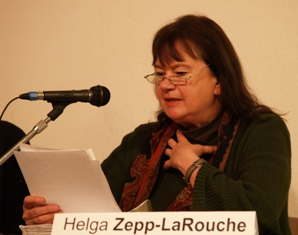
Helga Zepp-LaRouche in 2006

The BüSo is part of the worldwide LaRouche movement which, according to the Berliner Zeitung, operates in Germany as the Schiller Institute, the LaRouche Youth Movement, and the BüSo. The newspaper wrote in 2007 that the movement had around 300 followers in Germany at that time.

The BüSo is the third in a series of small parties founded in Germany by the movement. The earlier two, now defunct, were the Europäische Arbeiterpartei (the European Labor Party), which was active in the 1970s and early 1980s and still exists in some Scandinavian countries, and the Patrioten für Deutschland (Patriots for Germany), active during the mid 1980s to early 1990s.

== Federal state Associations ==
According to their homepage the party has in 2019 ten party associations (Landesverbände) on a federal state level; there are 16 federal states in Germany.

== Political campaigns ==
The Büso has campaigned for global infrastructure development with cutting edge technologies such as Maglev trains. They support the Transrapid and advocate that it be extended all over Europe and Asia in a "Eurasian Landbridge." The all-news TV channel N24 reported that: "For years the Bürgerrechtsbewegung Solidarität, or Büso for short, has promoted a new 'Eurasian Landbridge.' The Transrapid would travel through North, Central and South Asia all the way to the Far East, and connect to Japan, Korea, China, India and Indochina."

The party's headquarters are in Wiesbaden, and it is also particularly active in Berlin, where German LaRouche Youth Movement activist Daniel Buchmann was BüSo candidate to become mayor during the 2006 elections there.

== Controversial positions ==
The party is attributed by some observers to the far-right spectrum. At the same time BüSo, like the LaRouche movement described as "psycho-cult" because they have a "radical social reconstruction" striving with "End Time Visions" (collapse of the economic system). Other voices consider a classification of BüSo in the classic range of policy difficult. Their goals were reminiscent of approaches leftist politics, their formation on right concepts. Overall, it can be defined as a phantom party which exists solely to implement the ideas of LaRouche. Some critics call the organization, among other things because of her personality cult around LaRouche as a political sect. The party has been linked to antisemitic conspiracy theories (see Zionist Occupation Government). In 1979, the current chairman of the BüSo, Helga Zepp-LaRouche, wrote: "While in the US, no one especially cherishes even the slightest illusions about the power of the Zionist lobby the present administration, the influence of a covert Zionist lobby in the Federal Republic has been only a few initiated political figures known, but not the general public. And so we have to take the hypocritical Holocaust hoax as an opportunity to blow the whistle on these foreign agents.". The BüSo takes the position that statement refers to the television series Holocaust and not to the extermination programs of the Third Reich, which were not disputed by Zepp-LaRouche today. The BüSo began to focus on promoting the interests of Russia and China in the Western countries.
