= Schiller Institute =

German think tank associated with the LaRouche movement

- Established: 1984
- Board of Directors: Harley Schlanger, John Sigerson, Fred Huenefeld Jr., Theo Mitchell
- Budget: Revenue: $37,617; Expenses: $80,175 (FYE December 2015)
- Address: PO BOX 20244; Washington, D.C. 20041-0244
- Location: Washington, D.C., United States
- Website: www.schillerinstitute.com

The Schiller Institute is a German-based political and economic think tank founded in 1984 by Helga Zepp-LaRouche, with stated members in 50 countries. It is among the principal front organizations of the LaRouche movement. The institute's stated aim is to apply the ideas of the poet and philosopher Friedrich Schiller to what it calls the "contemporary world crisis." The Independent describes it as "an extremist political think-tank linked to a right-wing conspiracy theorist, Lyndon LaRouche." According to The Times, its aim is "to propagate [LaRouche's] increasingly wild anti-Semitic conspiracy theories."

The website of the Schiller Institute includes transcripts of conferences that the institute has sponsored, throughout North and South America, Europe, Asia, Africa and Australia, to promote the idea of what it calls "peace through development". The discussion at these conferences centers around LaRouche's proposals for infrastructure projects such as the "Eurasian Land Bridge", and the "Oasis Plan", a Middle East peace agreement based on Arab-Israeli collaboration on major water projects, as well as proposals for debt relief and a sweeping reorganization of the world monetary system. The Institute opposes the "Clash of Civilizations" thesis of Samuel Huntington, counter-posing what it calls a "Dialogue of Cultures". It supports the Belt and Road Initiative, which it says provides "shared mutually beneficial and balanced development".

It publishes quarterly magazines, such as Fidelio, a Journal of Poetry, Science, and Statecraft, and Ibykus, named after Schiller's poem "The Cranes of Ibykus."

After the death of Jeremiah Duggan, a Jewish student, at one of its conferences in 2003, the Institute was accused of antisemitism and cult-like operation.

== Founding ==
The institute was founded at a conference in Wiesbaden, Germany, in 1984 by Helga Zepp-LaRouche, the German-born wife of American political activist Lyndon LaRouche. Its stated aim is to seek to apply the ideas of poet, dramatist and philosopher Friedrich Schiller to the current global political situation. They emphasize Schiller's concept of the interdependence of classical artistic beauty and republican political freedom, as elaborated in his series of essays entitled Letters on the Aesthetical Education of Man.

On November 26, 1984, the institute released a "Declaration of the Inalienable Rights of Man," which it describes as "the basis of the Institute's work and efforts worldwide." It states in part:

We, therefore, Representatives of the Peoples of the World, appealing to the Supreme Judge of the world, do ... solemnly publish and declare that all countries of the world are and of right ought to be free and independent States. That all human beings on this planet have inalienable rights, which guarantee them life, freedom, material conditions worthy of man, and the right to develop fully all potentialities of their intellect and their souls. That, therefore, a change in the present economic and monetary order is necessary and urgent to establish justice among the peoples of the world.

— Signators at Schiller Institute conference

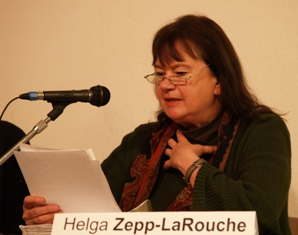
Helga Zepp-LaRouche

Zepp-LaRouche has explained the need for the Schiller Institute as follows:

We need a movement that can finally free Germany from the control of the Versailles and Yalta treaties, which have tossed us from one catastrophe to another for an entire century.

— Helga Zepp-LaRouche.

Among the past and present members of the institute's board of directors are Helga Zepp-LaRouche, Webster Tarpley, Civil rights leader Amelia Boynton Robinson, former South Carolina State Assemblyman Theo Mitchell, classical singer William Warfield, former Guyanese Foreign Minister Frederick Wills, physicist Winston H. Bostick, and former Borough President of Manhattan Hulan Jack. Among the founding members of the institute were Hulan Jack and French Resistance leader Marie-Madeleine Fourcade.

== Political activity ==
The Institute's constitution, adopted in 1984, opposes international financial institutions and other supranational bodies for causing a state of tyranny in the world, especially amongst developing nations.

The Institute website includes transcripts of conferences that the institute has sponsored worldwide to promote the idea of what it calls "peace through development". The discussion at these conferences has generally centered around LaRouche's proposals for infrastructure projects such as the "Eurasian Land Bridge", and the "Oasis Plan", a Middle East peace agreement based on Arab–Israeli collaboration on major water projects. The conferences also typically discuss proposals for debt relief and the "New Bretton Woods," a proposal for a sweeping reorganization of the world monetary system (see Political views of Lyndon LaRouche). The Institute strongly opposes the "Clash of Civilizations" thesis of Samuel Huntington, counterposing what it calls a "Dialogue of Cultures".

According to the LaRouche movement's Executive Intelligence Review, LaRouche formed a group called the "Committee to Save the Presidency" to fight the international financiers who he said were behind an attempted coup against President Bill Clinton. Schiller Institute collected petition signatures defending Clinton, and picketed the U.S. Capitol in 1999 with signs that said "Save the Presidency! Jail Kenneth 'Porno' Starr". A Schiller Institute spokesperson said "This is a coup to overthrow the United States government and disenfranchise the American electorate".

The Institute proposed for a national Maglev train system in Denmark in 2007. In the 2007 Danish elections there were four candidates for parliament affiliated with the Institute. They received 197 votes nationwide (while at least 32,000 are needed for a local mandate). The candidates garnered press coverage, including an interview with Tom Gillesberg in Berlingske Tidende, which discussed the slogan of the LaRouche slate, "After the financial crash, Maglev over Kattegat.".

In March 2009, the Danish branch of the institute distributed flyers at a climate change conference in Copenhagen which asserted that "British Climate lies will lead to Genocide", stating that the Bush administration had been a puppet of the British Empire, that "solar activity, not human activity, is the main factor in the Earth's changing climate," and that "massive investment in windmills and solar panels" to combat climate change would create genocide by raising the price of food.

In 2016, speakers at its conference in Australia included UK Labour Party MPs Jeremy Corbyn and Michael Meacher and UK Conservative Party activist Robert Oulds. Corbyn spoke on “the dangers embodied in NATO’s eastward expansion, the hideous aftermath of the Iraq and Afghanistan Wars, and the impact of Britain’s al-Yamamah arms deal with Saudi Arabia for the money flows in the Middle East, including those connected with terrorism”.

The Institute supports Donald Trump, who they said in 2019 was being ousted in a "seditious coup". It supports Chinese leader Xi Jinping.

== Cultural activity ==
It held a conference on Saint Augustine in Rome in 1985. Its Labor Day conference in Reston, Virginia, 1986, featured a performance of Mozart's Requiem at C. In 1990 it held a conference on infrastructure in Berlin. In 1993 its Khartoum conference on religions was sponsored by the government of Sudan. In 1997, a conference in Manila featured Jozef Mikloško, president of the Slovak branch of the Schiller Institute and former vice premier of Czechoslovakia. In 2000, it held a Memorial seminar for Russian Schiller Institute leader Taras V. Muranivsky in Moscow, Russia.

=== Fidelio ===
The institute has published its quarterly magazine, Fidelio, since 1992, described as a "Journal of Poetry, Science, and Statecraft." It was co-founded and edited by Kenneth Kronberg. The magazine is named after Ludwig van Beethoven's opera, Fidelio, which tells the story of a political prisoner who is freed by the courage of his wife. At the time the magazine was founded, Lyndon LaRouche was still in prison.

Its issues have included articles on Homer, Henry VII, Benjamin Franklin, Gottfried Leibniz, the Vier ernste Gesänge of Johannes Brahms, Vice President Dick Cheney, Paul Kreingold's “I.L. Peretz, Father of the Yiddish Renaissance”, and reviews of books, art exhibits, and musical, and dramatic performances.

=== Verdi tuning ===
In 1988, the institute initiated a campaign to establish "philosophical pitch" or "scientific pitch" as the classical music concert pitch standard. This tuning system is based on middle C set at 256 Hz, making concert A 430.539 Hz rather than the most commonly used 440 Hz. The Schiller Institute calls this system "Verdi tuning" because it was Italian composer Giuseppe Verdi who first sought to stop the increase in pitch to which orchestras are tuned. However, Verdi used the French standard 435 Hz in writing his Requiem in 1874; later he indicated that 432 Hz was slightly more optimal. It is this A=432 Hz standard that the Schiller Institute advocates, which aligns mathematically with their stated preference for C=256 Hz as long as Pythagorean tuning is used (in equal temperament or just intonation, A would be 430.541 Hz or 426.667 Hz, respectively). French acoustic physicist Joseph Sauveur first researched then proposed the philosophical pitch standard in 1713, more than a century before Verdi began leading orchestras. Sauveur was strongly resisted by the musicians he was working with, and the proposed standard was not adopted.

In 1999, the institute circulated a petition calling for the establishment of a permanent orchestra in Verdi's childhood home in Busseto, Italy, employing the special tuning in order to mark the composer's centennial.

The tuning initiative is opposed by Stefan Zucker. According to Zucker, the Institute sponsored a bill in Italy to impose the Verdi tuning on state-sponsored musicians that included provisions for fines and confiscation of non-Verdi tuning forks. Zucker has written that he believes the claims about the Verdi tuning are historically inaccurate. Institute followers are reported by Tim Page of Newsday to have stood outside concert halls with petitions to ban the music of Vivaldi and even to have disrupted a concert conducted by Leonard Slatkin in order to pass out pamphlets titled "Leonard Slatkin Serves Satan."

=== Other music initiatives ===
In 1992, the institute published A Manual on the Rudiments of Tuning and Registration: Book I: Introduction and Human Singing Voice, which discusses the tuning issue from the artistic and the scientific point of view. The Institute asserts the Bel Canto method of singing is "one of the best examples of mankind's ability to discover an existing physical principle, and to use that discovery to create new works of science and art, which then increase humanity's power to build civilization." They also assert that composers such as J.S. Bach, Wolfgang Amadeus Mozart, Ludwig van Beethoven, and Giuseppe Verdi all wrote with the distinct vocal registers of the Bel Canto system in mind, and that their compositions intentionally exploit the different tone colors that these registers produce.

In 2010, 25 LaRouche supporters protesting a new production of Richard Wagner's Der Ring des Nibelungen presented by the Los Angeles Opera carried signs that said, "Wagner: Loved by Nazis, Rejected by Humans" and "L.A. County: $14 Million to promote Nazi Wagner, Layoffs for Music Teachers". They distributed flyers from the Schiller Institute which asked "Does Los Angeles County have nothing better to do ... than bail out L.A. Opera, so that it can celebrate the monstrous sexual fantasies, and the cult of violence, of that vile anti-Semite, Wagner?"

The Schiller Institute presented a performance of Mozart's Requiem at the Cathedral of the Holy Cross in Boston, on January 19, 2014, the 50th anniversary of the performance of Mozart's Requiem and pontifical mass for John F. Kennedy which was held at the Cathedral. Remarks were made by Ambassador Ray Flynn, and a letter was read from Irish President Michael D. Higgins. Recordings of speeches by President Kennedy were also featured.

=== Drama and poetry ===
The institute has published a four-volume series of English translations of the works of Friedrich Schiller, entitled Poet of Freedom, as well as some translations into other languages.

== Ties to the LaRouche movement ==
The Schiller Institute is closely tied to Lyndon LaRouche. The institute's website states that "[i]t is his work and his ideas, [which] inspired the creation of the international Schiller Institute, as well as his intellectual and moral leadership that continue to set the standard for the policies and activity of the movement." LaRouche's writings are featured prominently in Schiller Institute communications. Before his death in 2019, LaRouche was the keynote speaker at most of the Schiller Institute's conferences.

== Criticism and controversies ==
=== Death of Jeremiah Duggan ===
In 2003, Jeremiah Duggan, a student who had been attending a Schiller Institute conference in Germany, died. Duggan had been attending a Schiller Institute conference and LaRouche Youth Movement cadre school in Wiesbaden, Germany, at which Lyndon LaRouche spoke. Duggan died after running onto a busy road. The German police investigation found that he had committed suicide. A British inquest rejected that verdict after hearing testimony about the nature of the Schiller Institute.

=== Allegations of antisemitism ===
Following Duggan's death, the Schiller Institute was accused of spreading antisemitic conspiracy theories. According to Duggan's mother,

In Jerry's notes on the five days he spent there, Mrs Duggan discovered that her son had become aware of the anti-Semitic agenda of many LaRouche followers and had spoken out against them. "There were a lot of comments blaming the Jews for Iraq and he got up to say that he was Jewish and he didn't support the war," she said. "Whatever happened it's clear he fell out with these people very quickly."

According to The Times, "Seminar participants were told that the war had been concocted by a tightly knit group of Jewish bankers with immense political influence over the US Administration." An internal London Metropolitan Police (Scotland Yard) letter, obtained by the BBC's Newsnight during a British investigation into the death says: "The Schiller Institute and the LaRouche Youth Movement... blames the Jewish people for the Iraq war and all the other problems in the world. Jeremiah's lecture notes and bulletins showed the antisemitic nature of [the] ideology."

In an interview with Newsnight, Chip Berlet of Political Research Associates, an American research group that tracks right-wing movements, said:

The antisemitism at a meeting of the Schiller Institute would not be obvious at first. You would have to listen over time to a... set of patterns, and you would begin to hear the echoes of the classic antisemitic conspiracy theories, in the way that Israel is talked about, in the way that Jews are talked about, in the way that the idea is put forward that the wars of America are somehow manipulated by Jewish lobbies and Israeli interests, and this really is an echo of the old classic antisemitic conspiracy theories. It's not that every criticism of Israel or American-Jewish lobby groups is antisemitic, but over time this pattern emerges."

The German newspaper Berliner Zeitung also categorizes the Schiller Institute as antisemitic.

The Schiller Institute issued a statement in response to the controversy, calling it "a politically motivated smear job" based on "conspiracy theories," and alleged that the Institute was being targeted because of its opposition to the Iraq War.

A 2008 academic publication by Matthew Feldman, a specialist on the far right, described the "role of the Schiller Institute in disseminating ‘revisionism’, essentially coded anti-Semitic Holocaust denial, incitement to racial hatred, and radical right propaganda more broadly."

=== Cult allegations ===
Following the 2003 death of Duggan, cult allegations were made. According to the Berliner Zeitung, the LaRouche movement in Germany, operating as the Schiller Institute, LaRouche Youth Movement, Europäische Arbeiterpartei and Bürgerrechtsbewegung Solidarität (BüSo), had around 300 followers in 2007, and "next to Scientology, [was] the cult soliciting most aggressively in German streets at [that] time."

The BBC's Newsnight has said the institute places members under "psychological duress," during "so-called psycho sessions." Aglaja Beyes Corleis, a member of the Schiller Institute for 16 years, who left in the early 1990s and wrote a book about the Institute, told the BBC:

When I speak with family members how I was then at that time, [they] tell me 'You were like from a different planet.' ... People tend to be drawn into it who did not want to be drawn into it, who did not want to join a cult or a sect or something like that ... I was freaked out and I experienced that other people freaked out. I saw other people who, members who, got out of their mind ... Sometimes Jewish members were put under special pressure. For instance, at a public meeting, the person was picked out and publicly attacked – 'your mother visited Israel'."

On November 6, 2003, a British inquest heard allegations that the Schiller Institute is a "political cult with sinister and dangerous connections." which may have used controversial recruitment techniques on Duggan.

=== Death of Kenneth Kronberg ===
Kenneth Kronberg, co-founder and editor of the Schiller Institute's magazine, Fidelio, and the president of a LaRouche movement printing business, committed suicide in April 2007. According to Nicholas F. Benton, a former member of the LaRouche movement, Kronberg killed himself on the day that a so-called "morning briefing" (published daily by the LaRouche movement) heavily criticized Kronberg's printing business. Kronberg's printing business was also reported to be in financial trouble, the Washington Monthly described the companies finances as being "in perilous shape. Various LaRouche organizations owed Kronberg hundreds of thousands of dollars. When the IRS and Virginia tax authorities came calling over withholding payments, Ken knew he was in serious trouble."

=== Russian invasion of Ukraine ===
During the 2022 Russian invasion of Ukraine, the Schiller Institute held an international discussion which concluded that "the confrontation with Russia is detrimental to Germany and the EU". The Ukrainian government Center for Countering Disinformation said the conclusion was "an attempt by Russia to impose their point of view on the world". Zepp-LaRouche was described as "often resort[ing] to distorting facts from history."
