= Scientific pitch =

Absolute concert pitch standard

256 Hz

Note	Approximate frequency (Hz)	Audible?
C_{−4}	1	
C_{−3}	2	
C_{−2}	4	
C_{−1}	8	
C_{0}	16	check
C_{1}	32	check
C_{2}	64	check
C_{3}	128	check
C_{4}	256	check
C_{5}	512	check
C_{6}	1024	check
C_{7}	2048	check
C_{8}	4096	check
C_{9}	8192	check
C_{10}	16384	check
C_{11}	32768	
C_{12}	65536	

Scientific pitch, also known as philosophical pitch, Sauveur pitch or Verdi tuning, is an absolute concert pitch standard which is based on middle C (C_{4}) being set to 256 Hz rather than ~261.63 Hz, (Note: This middle C of ~261.63 Hz is exactly $220\sqrt[4]{2}$.) making it ~37.63 cents lower than the common A440 pitch standard. It was first proposed in 1713 by French physicist Joseph Sauveur and later promoted briefly by Italian composer Giuseppe Verdi in the 19th century.

Since the 1980s the Schiller Institute, an organisation of the LaRouche movement propagated a pitch of 432 Hz for A, which is slightly higher than the Sauveur pitch. But they also made controversial esoteric claims regarding the effects of this pitch and referenced it to Joseph Sauveur.

Scientific pitch is not used by concert orchestras but is still sometimes favored in scientific writings for the convenience of all the octaves of C being an exact power of 2 when expressed in hertz (symbol Hz). The octaves of C remain a whole number in hertz all the way down to 1 Hz. Instead of A above middle C (A_{4}) being set to the widely used standard of 440 Hz, scientific pitch assigns it a frequency of 430.54 Hz. There is no scientific evidence that music tuned to 432 Hz has healing benefits.

== History ==
Concert tuning pitches tended to vary from group to group, and by the 17th century the pitches had been generally creeping upward (i.e., becoming "sharper"). The French acoustic physicist Joseph Sauveur, a non-musician, researched musical pitches and determined their frequencies. He found several frequency values for A_{4} as presented to him by musicians and their instruments, with A_{4} ranging from 405 to 421 Hz. Other contemporary researchers such as Christiaan Huygens, Vittorio Francesco Stancari and Brook Taylor were finding similar and lower values for A_{4}, as low as 383 Hz. In 1701, Sauveur proposed that all musical pitches should be based on a son fixe (fixed sound), that is, one unspecified note set to 100 Hz, from which all others would be derived. In 1713, Sauveur changed his proposal to one based on C_{4} set to 256 Hz; this was later called "philosophical pitch" or "Sauveur pitch". Sauveur's push to standardize a concert pitch was strongly resisted by the musicians with whom he was working, and the proposed standard was not adopted. The notion was revived periodically, including by mathematician Sir John Herschel and composer John Pyke Hullah in the mid-19th century, but never established as a standard.

In the 19th century, Italian composer Giuseppe Verdi tried to stop the increase in the pitch to which orchestras were tuned. In 1874 when he wrote his Requiem he insisted on the official French standard diapason normal pitch of A_{4} tuned to 435 Hz. Later, he indicated that 432 Hz would be slightly better for orchestras. One solution he proposed was scientific pitch, but he had little success.

In 1988, Lyndon LaRouche's Schiller Institute initiated a campaign to establish scientific pitch as the classical music concert pitch standard. The Institute called this pitch "Verdi tuning" because of the connection to the famous composer. Even though Verdi tuning uses 432 Hz for A_{4} and not 430.54, it is said by the Schiller Institute to be derived from the same mathematical basis: 256 Hz for middle C. The Institute's arguments for the notation included points about historical accuracy and references to Johannes Kepler's treatise on the movement of planetary masses. The Schiller Institute initiative was opposed by opera singer Stefan Zucker. According to Zucker, the Institute sponsored a bill in Italy to impose scientific notation on state-sponsored musicians that included provisions for fines and confiscation of all other tuning forks. Zucker has written that he believes the Schiller Institute's claims about Verdi tuning are historically inaccurate. Institute followers are reported by Tim Page of Newsday to have stood outside concert halls with petitions to ban the music of Antonio Vivaldi and even to have disrupted a concert conducted by Leonard Slatkin in order to pass out pamphlets titled "Leonard Slatkin Serves Satan".

== See also ==
- History of pitch standards in Western music
