= Frederick Wills (Guyana) =

Guyanese lawyer and politician (1928–1992)

Frederick "Fred" Rudolph Wills

Minister of Foreign Affairs of Guyana
- In office 1975–1978

Personal details
- Born: 18 September 1928
- Died: 1992 (aged 63–64)
- Education: King's College London
- Occupation: Politician

Frederick "Fred" Rudolph Wills (18 September 1928 – 1992) was the Minister of Foreign Affairs of Guyana from 1975 to 1978. He was a renowned statesman, lawyer, cricket expert and intellectual. Wills is cited for his intellectual and academic genius by oral stories from his fellow-Guyanese and globally.

== Education and career in England ==
Fred Wills studied law at King's College London, where he was awarded the Jelf Medal for his outstanding academic success as a law graduate. He was also named to Queen's Counsel, the highest level of judges in England. However, he never practised as a judge in England, instead returning to Guyana.

== Return to Guyana ==
When he returned to Guyana, he became famous for being one of the top legal minds in Guyana, while also contributing to developing the law and constitution in Guyana. When the Guyanese president Forbes Burnham came into power he appointed Wills as Justice Minister and later Foreign Affairs Minister. In that capacity Wills briefly presided over the United Nations Security Council and twice addressed the General Assembly, once on independence for East Timor and once on 27 September 1976, to promote a Third World debt moratorium.

== Move to the United States ==
Wills's government service ended in 1978 and he moved to the United States. There, he became a professor at Rutgers University in New Jersey and an associate of Lyndon LaRouche, although he later distanced himself from LaRouche and from LaRouche's wife, Helga Zepp-LaRouche. He was a founding board member of the Schiller Institute in 1984.

== Personal life ==
Fred Wills was married to Doris Harper-Wills, whom he divorced and later remarried. He served as club captain for the Demerara Cricket Club (DCC) in Georgetown, Guyana, and was a popular radio announcer at cricket games and for the programme Fred Wills on Sport transmitted in the Caribbean region. In the U.S., Guyanese cricket fans have proposed renaming the DCC Pavilion as "Fred Wills Pavilion".

Wills died in New Jersey in 1992.
