= Kenneth Kronberg =

American businessman (1948–2007)

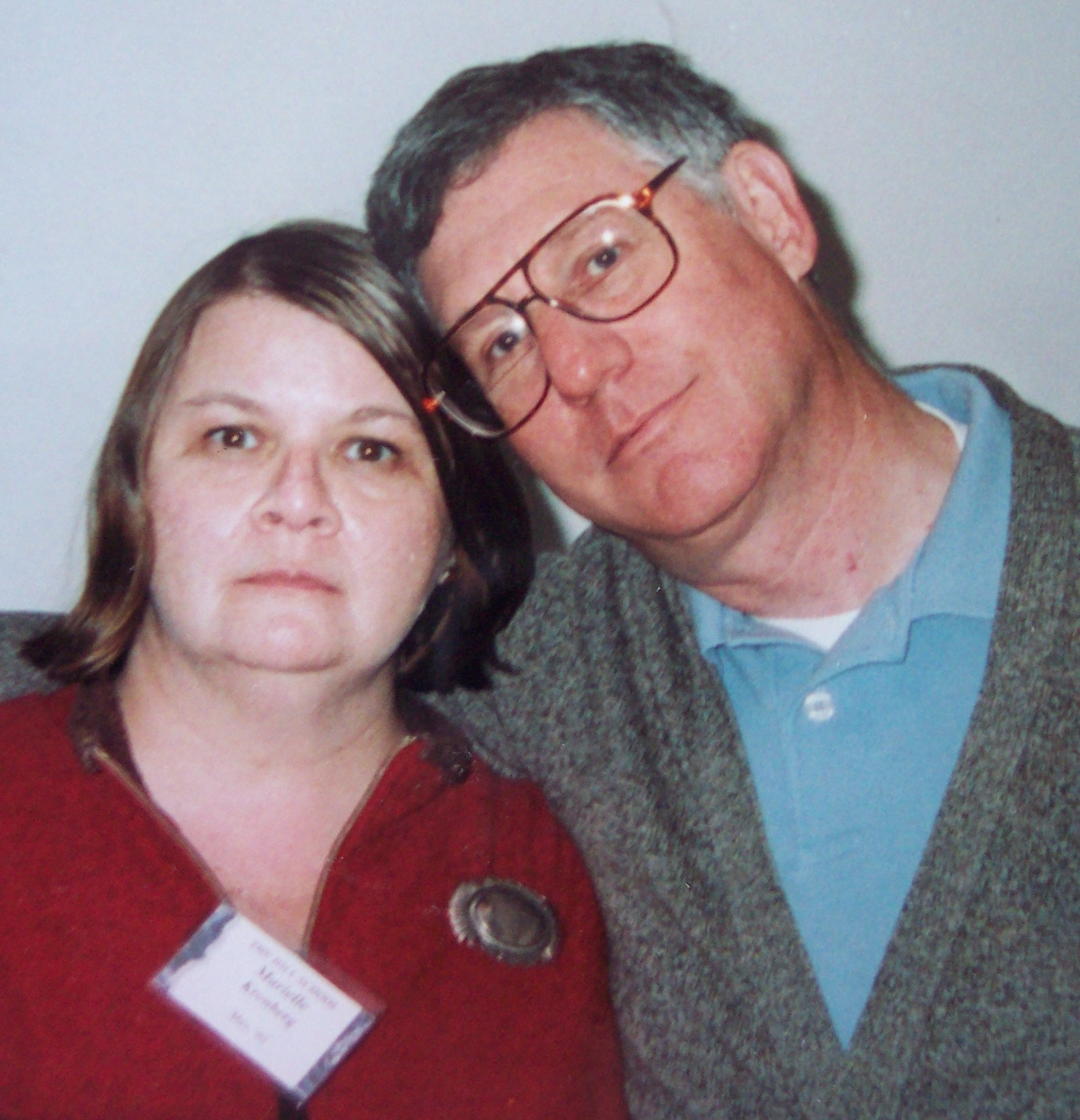
Kenneth and Marielle Kronberg in 2001.

Kenneth Lewis Kronberg (April 18, 1948 – April 11, 2007) was an American businessman and long-time member of the LaRouche movement, an organization founded by American political activist Lyndon LaRouche.

He was president of PMR Printing Co. and World Composition Services Inc., in Sterling, Virginia, printing businesses set up in 1978 to print material for the LaRouche movement, which received most of the money the LaRouche organisation spent on producing pamphlets; but the companies also worked for other clients including the United Nations and the Ford Foundation. He was also co-founder and editor of Fidelio, the magazine of the Schiller Institute, a LaRouche movement think-tank founded by Helga Zepp-LaRouche.

Kronberg died after jumping from a highway overpass on April 11, 2007, in what a spokesman for the Loudoun County Sheriff's Office said was an apparent suicide—the cause of death also recorded on the death certificate.

== Biography ==
Kronberg was born in the Bronx, New York. He graduated at the age of 16 from Bronx High School of Science, and graduated in 1968 with a bachelor's degree from St. John's College, Santa Fe, New Mexico; he then spent a year as a junior fellow at the Center for the Study of Democratic Institutions with Robert M. Hutchins in Santa Barbara, California. In discussing his time at St. John's and the Center years later, Kronberg described himself as a "Socratic revolutionary."

He did graduate work in economics at the New School for Social Research Graduate Faculty in New York, and was employed as an editor by the American Institute of Physics, Marcel Dekker, and John Wiley & Sons.

He directed amateur theater, specializing in Shakespeare, and taught classes in poetry and drama. He edited various LaRouche-related cultural magazines (Campaigner, Fidelio) and wrote on many topics, including "How to Read Poetry"; the economy, demography, and culture of Ancient Rome; William Gilbert and his work on magnetism." .

=== Involvement with the LaRouche movement ===
Kronberg became involved with the LaRouche movement, regarded by critics as a political cult, in 1971 after reading a LaRouche newspaper (New Solidarity) at a friend's house. A friend told Avi Klein of Washington Monthly: "He was sold on the guy from the beginning."

In The Washington Monthly, Avi Klein writes that the relationship with LaRouche seemed to be a perfect fit for Kronberg with his publishing experience, because the LaRouche movement's growth was being driven by its publication of political pamphlets and newspapers, which members would hand out on campuses and on the streets. Klein's sources, including ex-members and Kronberg's wife, say Kronberg was "horrified" by the "dark side" of the LaRouche movement, and that in the early 1970s, LaRouche began to engage in "ego stripping" sessions with senior members in which the member's core beliefs and relationship with his family were attacked. During one such session, Kronberg was allegedly so disgusted that he threw a soda bottle across the room and walked out. Klein reports that Kronberg was also shocked by the so-called Chris White affair in 1974, when LaRouche became convinced that White, his ex-girlfriend's new husband, had been brainwashed and sent by British intelligence to assassinate him. LaRouche "deprogammed" White over a period of two weeks. The New York Times obtained a tape recording of the sessions, during which "weeping and vomiting" could be heard, as well as someone saying "Raise the voltage," though LaRouche later said this had to do with the bright lights used during the questioning, not an electric shock.

Despite his misgivings, Kronberg believed LaRouche was a genius. Klein writes that Kronberg "rationalized his leader's seemingly crackpot ideas," telling family members that LaRouche didn't really believe all the things he was saying. In 1974, Kronberg became a national committee member of the National Caucus of Labor Committees (NCLC), part of the LaRouche movement. He was the production editor of their newspaper, New Solidarity, edited their magazine, The Campaigner, and later co-founded and edited Fidelio, a publication of LaRouche's Schiller Institute. He was a founding board member of Caucus Distributors, one of the key LaRouche companies. In 1978, he founded World Composition Services, which typeset material for LaRouche; according to Klein, Kronberg's companies also worked for other clients such as the United Nations and the Ford Foundation, as "low-cost printing" for LaRouche in reality often meant "free printing".

According to a memorial posted on a LaRouche website, Kronberg also played a leading role in promoting the ideas of Heinrich Heine and the Yiddish Renaissance. He did research, wrote, and taught classes on the English scientist William Gilbert, and on the Roman Empire. His poem honoring Indira Gandhi was given to her son, Rajiv Gandhi, then the Prime Minister of India, who had it published in the April 1987 issue of Congress Varnika, the magazine of the then-ruling Congress Party. But his greatest love was Shakespeare, LaRouche's views about whom Kronberg disputed.

Kronberg's widow and family maintain a website dedicated to him that can be found at http://www.kennethkronberg.com/kk/.

=== Print shop's financial problems ===
Nicholas F. Benton, owner of the Falls Church News-Press and himself a former member of the LaRouche movement, writes that at the beginning of 2007, the LaRouche movement realized Kronberg's printing company (PMR) was on the verge of bankruptcy. He says that the financial problems stemmed from the movement's failure to pay the print shop for its services, as a consequence of which the company was in arrears with its tax payments, including employee withholding.

One ex-LaRouche supporter told Nicholas Benton: "There was never any money at PMR and members were paid only half their salaries, which were already pittances, and then Ken paid himself only once a month."

Klein writes that in March 2007, the LaRouche Political Action Committee told Kronberg that they had decided not to pay the money they owed him, and that they also asked that he return a $100,000 advance to the company, which Avi Klein writes Kronberg had already spent. Klein writes that Kronberg feared the movement would raid an escrow account that held $235,000 the company owed the Internal Revenue Service (IRS).

So long as Kronberg was in control of the printing operation, Klein writes, he hoped he was safe from LaRouche movement attacks on his family, because the print shop was so central to the movement's existence. When he realized it was about to collapse, he reportedly told his wife, two days before his death: "I will be vilified. You and I will be vilified like nothing you've seen yet. It will be ugly; it will be brutal. This is going to be the worst week of my life."

=== Death ===
At 10:17 a.m. on the morning of his death, after reportedly reading the "morning briefing" in his office, Kronberg instructed his accountant by e-mail to transfer to the IRS the $235,000 held in the escrow account. He drove to the Dulles Mail Facility where he mailed some family bills, then headed back toward PMR over the Waxpool Road overpass in Sterling. He pulled his car off the road on the overpass, left his emergency lights blinking, and jumped.

He died after jumping from the overpass at 10:30 a.m. onto the northbound lanes of Route 28. A spokesman for the Loudoun County Sheriff's Office said the death was an apparent suicide.

At his death, Kronberg left his wife of 36 years, Molly, and their son, Max Isaac Thomas Kronberg, who was 22 at the time.

Avi Klein and Nicholas Benton have linked Kronberg's death to a daily internal document, the so-called "morning briefing," which is circulated among members of the LaRouche movement, and which Benton writes they regard as authoritative.

The briefing circulated on the morning of Kronberg's death appears to have been addressed to the movement's younger generation. It attacked the print shop, calling it among the worst of the failures of the "baby boomer" generation – referring to members who joined the movement in the 1960s and 1970s.

It continued: "the Boomers will be scared into becoming human, because you're in the real world, and they're not. Unless they want to commit suicide."

Molly Kronberg told Klein that her husband killed himself to draw public attention to the print shop's financial position and the reasons for it, and that it was "...as such ...the bravest political act of his life."

In an interview conducted by PRA, Molly Kronberg stated that she believes her husband's suicide was an attempt by him to escape the "terrible tension [in her opinion caused by LaRouche's alleged antisemitism and megalomania], and his legal and financial entanglements on behalf of the organization."

== Personal life ==
Kronberg's wife, Marielle ("Molly") Hammett, was for years deeply involved with the movement, being elected to the National Committee in December 1982. As part of the LaRouche trials of the late 1980s, starting with LaRouche's own federal trial, conviction, and imprisonment, Molly Kronberg was tried with other LaRouche followers in 1989 in New York and convicted of one count of scheme to defraud. She was sentenced to five years probation and later sued LaRouche.
