= Worldwide LaRouche Youth Movement =

American political organization

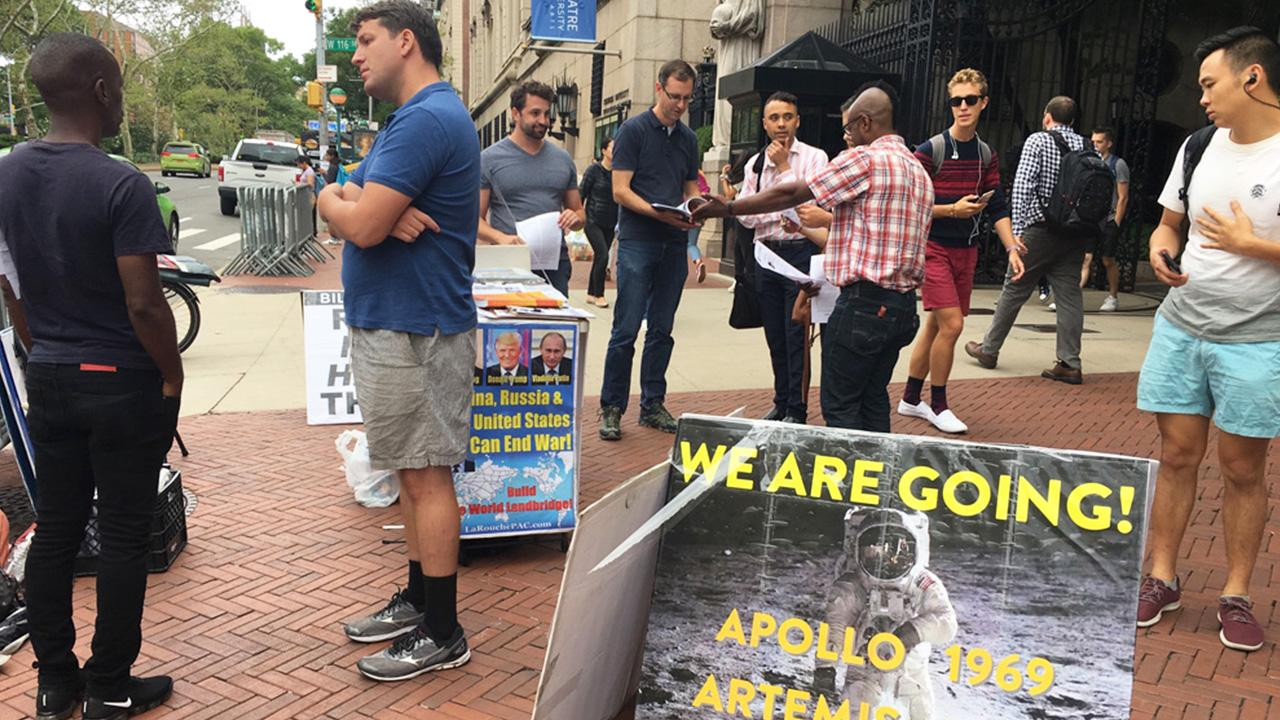
LaRouche members campaigning

The Worldwide LaRouche Youth Movement (WLYM or LYM) and the LaRouche Political Action Committee (LaRouche PAC or LPAC) are part of the political organization of controversial American political figure Lyndon LaRouche. The LYM's "war room" is in Leesburg, Virginia, also the headquarters of LPAC. The LaRouche Youth Movement describes itself as an international political movement of young adults, led by Lyndon LaRouche, who promote the revival of classical humanist thought, organize politically to establish a new world economic system based on the power of human creativity to increase the power of the human individual in relation to the universe, and fight for a physical economy which can promote the general welfare of humanity, to develop and move towards better living conditions.

== LaRouche Youth Movement ==
=== History ===
Barbara Boyd, spokesperson for the LYM and treasurer of LPAC, says that LYM was founded in 2000. According to Harley Schlanger, a LaRouche spokesperson, LYM's first major campaign was during the 2003 recall of California Governor Gray Davis, when it distributed over a million leaflets across the country, opposing the recall and depicting Arnold Schwarzenegger alongside Adolf Hitler. They also distributed tens of thousands of other pamphlets in California.

In a 2004 article in the University of California, Berkeley independent student newspaper, The Daily Californian, reporter David Cohn described the local chapter of the LYM as "30 college-aged youths" who spent several hours each day undergoing instruction provided by the LaRouche organization. One member, 23-year-old Jason Ross, told Cohn that he had dropped out of Stanford University in his junior year to join the movement. "We are in a complete breakdown of the financial system and we know that. We can use our time in a more appropriate manner than going to school," he said. Cohn also talked to three other members who had all quit school to join the movement. The Daily Californian reported the movement's numbers as "about 100 young people from Los Angeles to Oakland" who "travel to dozens of college campuses aggressively recruiting members and not hesitating to ask newcomers to quit school". As a result of the Internet, there are active chapters in nations like Japan where LaRouche has no official organization. The LYM has also expanded its activity into the African nations of South Africa, Zimbabwe, and Mozambique.

=== Democratic Party involvement ===
LYM members have been active in the Democratic Party at the state and local levels. In 2006, LaRouche Youth Movement activist and Los Angeles County Democratic Central Committee member Cody Jones was honored as "Democrat of the Year" for the 43rd Assembly District of California, by the Los Angeles County Democratic Party. At the April 2007, California State Democratic Convention, LYM activist Quincy O'Neal was elected vice-chairman of the California State Democratic Black Caucus, and Wynneal Innocentes was elected corresponding secretary of the Filipino Caucus. O'Neal is also president of the LYM's Democratic Party Club, the Franklin Delano Roosevelt Legacy Club, which is affiliated with the California Democratic Council. In March 2010, LaRouche Youth leader Kesha Rogers won the Democratic congressional primary in Houston, Texas' 22nd District.

=== Pedagogy and campaigns ===
LaRouche is highly critical of contemporary college curricula, and has designed his own pedagogy for members of his youth movement, which he describes as "the reliving of the crucial discoveries of universal physical-scientific principle by, successively, the ancient Pythagoreans and Plato and the modern science of Johannes Kepler," combined with the performance of classical vocal music, particularly Johann Sebastian Bach's Jesu, meine Freude. They spend time in what are called "Monge brigades," which emphasize readings of Vladimir Vernadsky, Alexander Hamilton, Carl Gauss and Bernhard Riemann. The LaRouche Youth have been assisted around the U.S. in performance workshops on classical music, as well as African-American spirituals, by well known musicians William Warfield and Sylvia Olden Lee, and in drama performance by actor Robert Beltran.

The LYM has disrupted university lectures to distribute their material. On October 23, 2006, a group of LaRouche Youth Movement members twice disrupted a Connecticut U.S. Senate debate between Alan Schlesinger, Ned Lamont, and Joseph Lieberman. According to The Day, as Joe Lieberman spoke, the hecklers "sang a harmonized ode targeting Vice President Dick Cheney, which, according to the group's website, is unofficially titled 'The Fat-Ass Nazi Song'."

During the election campaign of 2006, the LYM came into conflict with organizations including the Ayn Rand Institute, which the LYM accused of promoting genocide in speeches by its representatives at various campuses. LYM members confronted Institute executive director Yaron Brook at various universities across the US, heckling him and calling his policies "fascist". In one case, at the University of California, Irvine, 15 LYM members, some of whom violently resisted, were arrested.

LYM members frequently combine political activity with choral music performance. They sang outside the Democratic Party Convention in Boston in 2004, and in 2007 they performed choral music with lyrics about impeaching Dick Cheney in classrooms at Harvard and Boston University.

During 2007, LYM members have been seen in on the streets, campuses and conferences emphasizing two issues in particular: a call by LaRouche for the impeachment of Dick Cheney, and the assertion that the theory of human-caused global warming is a fraud motivated by Malthusianism. On this latter issue, LYM have confronted Al Gore on several occasions at his public events. In the Philippines, LYM members debated a variety of spokespersons for the Global Warming theory. In Argentina, LYM leader Betiana Gonzalez disrupted Gore's speech at a Biofuels conference. A similar incident took place earlier in the year in Montreal, Canada.

In November 2007, the LYM launched a campaign against social networking websites such as MySpace and Facebook, with the mass distribution of the pamphlet "The Noosphere vs. The Blogosphere: Is the Devil in Your Laptop?" The pamphlet says that Rupert Murdoch, owner of MySpace, and Microsoft, owner of Facebook (Microsoft owns only 2.5% of Facebook), are involved in social engineering to destroy the cognitive powers and potential for political leadership among young people.

TIME magazine's coverage of Kesha Rogers' campaign says that "The LYM espouses LaRouche opposition to free trade and 'globalism' (the UN, the World Bank, the International Monetary Fund) and it also calls for a return to a humanist classical education, emphasizing the works of Plato and Leibniz."

=== Criticism and accusations ===
Journalists, former members and law enforcement officials have made a wide variety of accusations of the LaRouche organizations, including a Scotland Yard report that called them a political cult. In 2006, college officials in Boston told a reporter that the LYM was one of the two leading high-pressure groups on area campuses, and that it engaged in strong-arm tactics to induce students to leave college and help recruit new members. Boyd called the charges "gossip" and said the movement was working "for ideas and real policies" and was a "youth movement in the Democratic Party". Investigative journalist and LaRouche biographer Dennis King has described the founding of the WLYM by LaRouche as a way of maintaining his legacy after his death by "[going] back to his roots, the roots of his movement in the radical campus movement in the late 1960s." Avi Klein of the Washington Monthly describes this as an element of a campaign LaRouche created to blame the "first generation" of his own movement for fundraising failures, and to appeal to young members by channeling "the rage new acolytes felt toward their parents at a nearby, internal enemy".

==== Jeremiah Duggan ====
After spending six days at a Schiller Institute conference and LYM cadre school in Germany, 22-year-old Jeremiah Duggan, a Jewish student from London who was studying in Paris, was believed to have run onto a busy road in what the British coroner called a "state of terror," and was killed. The German police investigation concluded that it was a suicide. A private forensic consultant said that he had found evidence of serious assault with a blunt instrument, but no public authorities have given credence to this claim. A LaRouche spokesman has said the young man killed himself because he was disturbed. In October 2004, a British inquest into Duggan's death heard allegations from his mother that LYM and the Schiller Institute may have used brainwashing techniques on her son to persuade him to join the movement.

==== Michael Winsted ====
An ex-member of the LaRouche youth movement has asserted that the LaRouche Youth Movement calls parents "brainwashed baby boomers." Ex-member Michael Winsted says that although members are convinced that they are involved in important political work, the job of most members is only to collect money and recruit more members. He says that group leaders "were constantly asking us if we would die for these ideas" and that members that become critical or disillusioned by the movement often become the focus of brutal psychological attacks by the other members, including accusations of having "mother issues," of homosexuality, sexual deviance, and allegiance to anti-LaRouche conspiracies. They are often encouraged and even led by the group's managers. Winsted recounts:

I'm caught off-guard, like, what the hell just happened?...The yelling goes on for maybe five or 10 minutes while I'm furiously backpedaling...They call it making somebody a self-conscious organizer...It is about getting somebody to break down and cry, just to have an emotional collapse. Once you do that, then people are malleable.

Jeffrey Steinberg, a top security aide in the LaRouche movement, responded by portraying Michael Winsted as an agent of the Washington Post who "briefly infiltrated the Baltimore chapter of the LYM".

== LaRouche PAC ==

The Lyndon LaRouche Political Action Committee was previously registered with the Federal Election Commission as "FDR PAC" and by "Spannaus in '96". In 2000, LaRouche's FDR PAC made news when, forbidden from soliciting on U.S. Post Office property, it demanded that the Salvation Army be treated the same way. As of 2002, Nancy Spannaus was the executive director of the PAC.

LPAC and LYM members targeted Senator Joe Lieberman's reelection campaign in 2006. At one campaign appearance three members sang loudly "If you want a third world war, vote for Joe, Bill Buckley's whore".

In 2007, two associates of LPAC, Robert Lucero and Tony DeFranco, were escorted off Post Office property in Naperville, Illinois, by police. The two were carrying signs calling President George W. Bush "dumb" and calling for the impeachment of Vice President Dick Cheney.

During his 2007 campaign for the New Jersey General Assembly, Gordon M. Johnson's contributions to LPAC became a subject of criticism. Johnson reportedly made seven contributions in 2005 and 2006 totalling $1,850. He apologized repeatedly, saying he regretted that he was not "aware of the LaRouche record of anti-Semitism" and was asking for the contributions to be refunded.

LPAC members promoted LaRouche's "Homeowners and Bank Protection Act" in 2009. One report says the act "would establish a federal agency that would place federal- and state-chartered banks under protection, freeze all existing home mortgages for a period of time, adjust mortgage values to fair prices, restructure existing mortgages at appropriate interest rates, and write off speculative debt obligations of mortgage-backed securities". According to one opponent, Congressman Paul E. Kanjorski, on closer inspection the act "calls for seizure by the government" of all U.S banks.

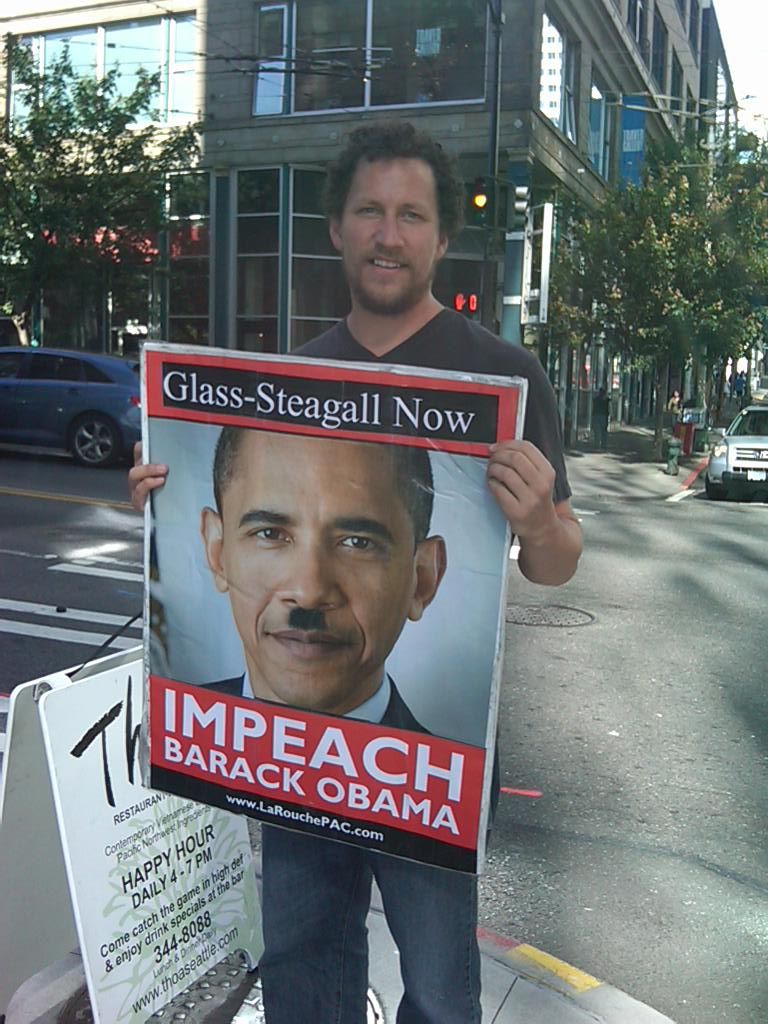
One such poster calling for Obama's impeachment in Seattle, 2010

In 2009 LPAC members were noted for their posters which depicted Barack Obama with a Hitler-style toothbrush mustache. They asked pedestrians "Do you want to stop Obama from killing people?" and "Want to fire our Nazi president?" The posters led to violent reactions from passersby, including one man who had lost family members in World War II. LPAC spokesperson Nancy Spannaus said that the posters were an "honest emblem of what the administration policy represents". A 2009 report says that the LPAC website, LaRouchePAC.com, appeared to have deliberately copied the look of the Barackobama.com website, though the contents were entirely different. The LPAC website reportedly contained satires of Democratic Party leaders and an attack of wind power.

Following complaints from customers, Kroger, a national grocery store chain, received an injunction in 2009 barring LPAC activists from soliciting donations or distributing literature on their Ralphs and Food 4 Less properties in Southern California. Another grocery chain, Trader Joe's, also sought an injunction after customers allegedly complained that the LPAC members had called them "bitches" and "Hitler lovers". Stater Brothers also sought an injunction to bar LPAC members from soliciting in front of their stores. Lyndon LaRouche, LPAC, and its treasurer Barbara Boyd were sued in 2009 by the widow of Kenneth Kronberg, who alleges that they had defamed her in an LPAC article. Kronberg and his wife had been longtime members of LaRouche movement before his suicide.

By 2010, LPAC members were calling for Obama's impeachment. Members of the Tea Party movement distanced themselves from the LPAC members, who often appeared at Tea Party rallies. One Tea Party official complained that the "Obama as Hitler" posters "trivializes the travesties that occurred under the Fascist regime of Nazi Germany". In 2010, LPAC members said the PAC staffed from 80 to 100 tables across the country every day.

Several confrontations between supporters of LPAC candidates and local residents were reported in April 2011 in Healdsburg, California. The police were called repeatedly, but no one was cited. Other LPAC workers report receiving a positive reception in San Francisco in March 2011.

On February 24, 2021, Helga Zepp-LaRouche denounced the LaRouche Political Action Committee (LPAC) and its treasurer, Barbara Boyd, for going "in a direction which I consider contrary to the central policies that my husband stood for. ... [S]ince he passed away in February 2019, Mrs. Boyd and her associates ... have embarked on a path that I believe misrepresents both my and Mr. LaRouche's positions", and has stated that LPAC and Boyd do not represent the LaRouche movement. She has taken legal action against LPAC to “immediately cease and desist, both now and in the future" from "using Mr. LaRouche’s name, likeness, and potentially other confusingly similar terms."

In 2022, the LaRouche PAC gave its endorsement to the Donald Trump 2024 presidential campaign.

== Funding and locations ==
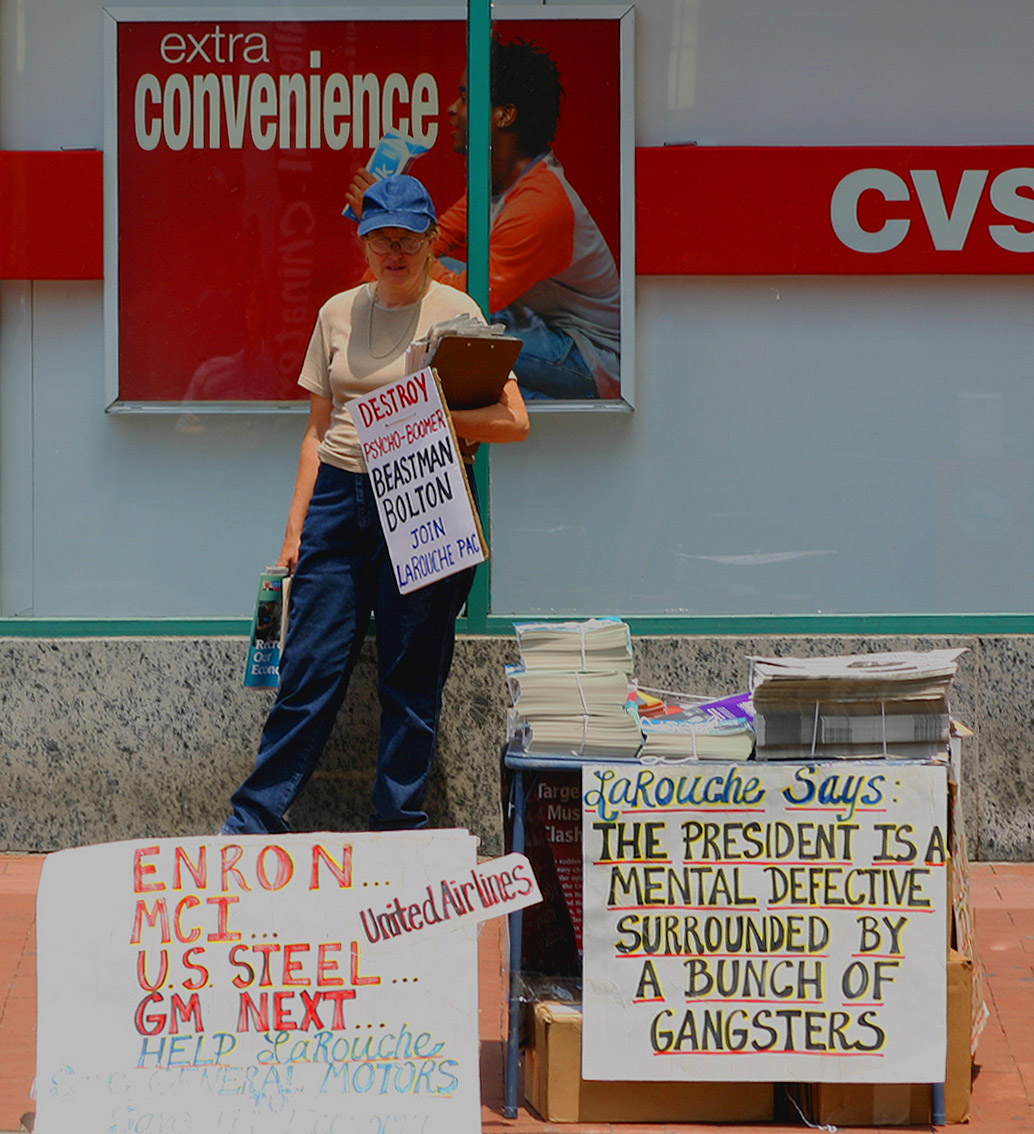
A table with LaRouche literature and a "Join LaRouche PAC" poster in May 2005, in Washington D.C.

LPAC received about $6 million during the 2009-2010 election cycle, according to public records and Out of the Storm News, a publication of The Heartland Institute. Donations came from nearly 5000 individuals, a large percentage of them from employees of the PAC or its affiliates. The largest donation, $12,425, came from Kathy Magraw, listed as a supervisor at LaRouche's Executive Intelligence Review. Magraw is also the largest individual recipient of funds from the PAC, receiving $129,705 during the cycle.

LYM received $3,142,142 from LPAC in the 2009-2010 election cycle. The Center for Public Integrity reports that almost $6 million of the $13 million raised by LPAC since 2007 went to LaRouche Youth, to pay for "grassroots lobbying and advocacy". The LaRouche Political Action Committee paid the group $462,850 in 2006, $2,732,851 during the 2008 election cycle, and $4,186,068 in the 2010 cycle.

According to Boyd, the payments to LaRouche Youth LLC are for web content, field organizing, canvassing, and public advocacy, all of which are categorized as "grassroots lobbying and advocacy". Boyd said the nearly $500,000 in uncategorized "petty cash" payments went to political organizing activities across the country, mostly vehicle operating expenses. In 2006, LPAC paid $7000 in fines to the FEC for failing to file mandatory disclosure forms.

LPAC gave $11,000 in contributions to three candidates in the 2009-2010 election cycle: $4000 each to "Kesha Rogers For Congress" and "Summer Shields for Congress", and $3000 to "Rachel Brown For Congress".

The LYM website lists 21 offices in the U.S. and Canada. The LPAC website lists 12 offices in the U.S.

== Publications ==
LPAC produces pamphlets which carry suggested donation requests. Publications include:

- The People of the U.S. No Longer Accept Their President or Congress August 2009
- President Obama’s ‘Narcissus Syndrome’ April 2009
- The Last Chance For Civilization? November 2008
- LaRouche’s Trip to Moscow: A Strategy For War Avoidance June 2007
- Implications of the Gore Hoax for International Policy March 2007
- Organizing the Recovery from the Great Crash of 2007 December 2006
- Is Joseph Goebbels On Your Campus? October 2006
- PROLEGOMENA FOR A PARTY PLATFORM: Franklin Roosevelt’s Legacy March 2006
- Children of Satan IV: Cheney’s ‘Schmittlerian’ Drive for Dictatorship January 2006
- ‘Pulling This Nation Together Now!’ September 2005
- Soldiers of Satan August 2005
- LaRouche on ‘The Case of a Vice-President’s Mass Insanity’ August 2005
- Dialogue with The Senate on Economic Policy: LaRouche’s Historic Webcast Of June 16, 2005 Jun 2005
- Earth's Next Fifty Years March 2005

== Videos and animations ==
The "Basement team" is variously described as belonging to the LYM or to LPAC. According to Boyd, LPAC pays LYM to produce videos. Most of the videos on Kesha Roger's campaign website were created by LPAC.

From 2006 to 2007, members of the team produced a set of computer animations described as a pedagogical tour through Johannes Kepler's New Astronomy and Harmony of the World, plus another set on the discovery of the orbit of Ceres titled The Mind of Gauss. After another website, keplersdiscovery.com, appeared that discussed the same works by Kepler, team members asserted that it was a plagiarized and inferior copy of their own work. In August 2008, the team released an hour-long video, The Harvard Yard, in which they elaborate their claim of plagiarism and charge that the "Kepler's Discovery" site was the work of Harvard University. In 2008 they issued Firewall – in Defense of the Nation State. This was followed by the release on July 3 of the feature-length sequel 1932, narrated by Robert Beltran, and a December production on scientific method, The Matter of Mind. They are also producing regular short videos on topical issues.
