= LaRouche movement =

Political movement promoting Lyndon LaRouche and his ideas

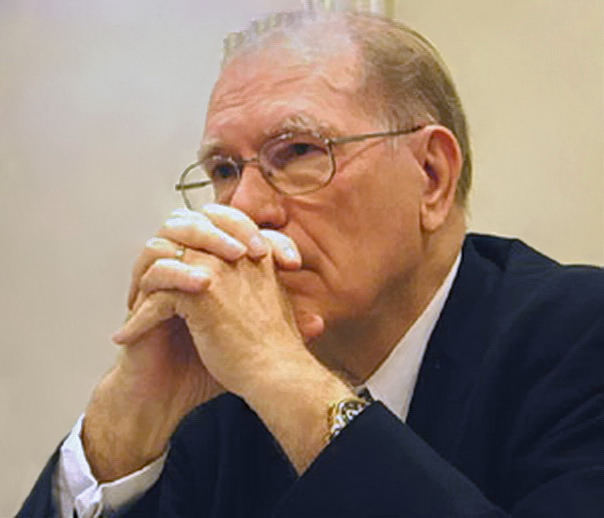
Lyndon LaRouche, the namesake and founder of the movement

The LaRouche movement is a political and cultural network promoting the late Lyndon LaRouche and his ideas. It has included many organizations and companies around the world, which campaign, gather information and publish books and periodicals. LaRouche-aligned organizations include the National Caucus of Labor Committees, the Schiller Institute, the Worldwide LaRouche Youth Movement and, formerly, the U.S. Labor Party. The LaRouche movement has been called "cult-like" by The New York Times.

The movement originated within the radical leftist student politics of 1960s United States. In the 1970s and 1980s hundreds of candidates ran in state Democratic primaries in the United States on the 'LaRouche platform', while Lyndon LaRouche repeatedly campaigned for presidential nomination. From the mid-1970s, the LaRouche network would adopt viewpoints and stances of the far-right. During its peak in the 1970s and 1980s, the LaRouche movement developed a private intelligence agency and contacts with foreign governments. In 1988, LaRouche and 25 associates were convicted on fraud charges related to fundraising. The movement called the prosecutions politically motivated.

LaRouche's widow, Helga Zepp-LaRouche, heads political and cultural groups in Germany connected with her late husband's movement. There are also parties in France, Sweden and other European countries and branches or affiliates in Australia, Canada, the Philippines and several Latin American countries. Members engage in political organizing, fund-raising, cultural events, research and writing.

== Main goals of the Lyndon LaRouche movement ==
- Restoration of Glass-Steagall. Since 2007, the movement has actively campaigned to restore the Glass-Steagall Act, to separate commercial banking from speculative investment banking, protecting the former and not bailing out the latter.
- New Bretton Woods. Advocates the abandonment of floating exchange rates and the return to Bretton Woods-style fixed rates, with gold, or an equivalent, used as under the gold-reserve system. This is not to be confused with the gold standard, which LaRouche did not support.
- American System. Espouses the "American System" of infrastructure projects, a "regulated banking system" and tariffs. Named for the historical American System of Henry Clay, but owing more to the ideas of the expansive American School.
- Eurasian Land Bridge. Lectures and writes on behalf of a "Eurasian land-bridge", a massive high-speed maglev railway project to span continents and re-invigorate industry and commerce.
- Scientific pitch. Argues in favor of what they call "Verdi tuning" in classical music, in which A=432 Hz, as opposed to the common practice today of tuning to A=440 Hz.
- Mars colonization. Recommends colonization of the planet Mars, on similar basis as many others in the field, that human survivability depends on territorial diversification.
- Strategic Defense Initiative. Supported directed beam weapons for use against ICBMs, and claims credit as the first to propose this to Ronald Reagan. LaRouche did not support rocket-based defensive systems such as anti-ballistic missiles.
- Fusion Energy Foundation. The LaRouche movement proclaimed an interest in fusion energy and "beam weapons" – while some scientists such as John Clarke praised the movement, it was generally seen as a front for LaRouche's political aims. According to Fusion, two members of the FEF went to the Soviet Union to attend a conference on "laser interaction" in December 1978.

== Political organizations ==
LaRouche-affiliated political parties have nominated many hundreds of candidates for national and regional offices in the U.S., Canada, Sweden, Denmark, Germany, Australia and France, for almost thirty years. In countries outside the U.S., the LaRouche movement maintains its own minor parties, and they have had no significant electoral success to date. In the U.S., individuals associated with the movement have successfully sought Democratic Party office in some elections, particularly Democratic County Central Committee posts, and been nominated for state and federal office as Democrats, although the party leadership has periodically voiced its disapproval.

=== United States ===
==== Political activities ====
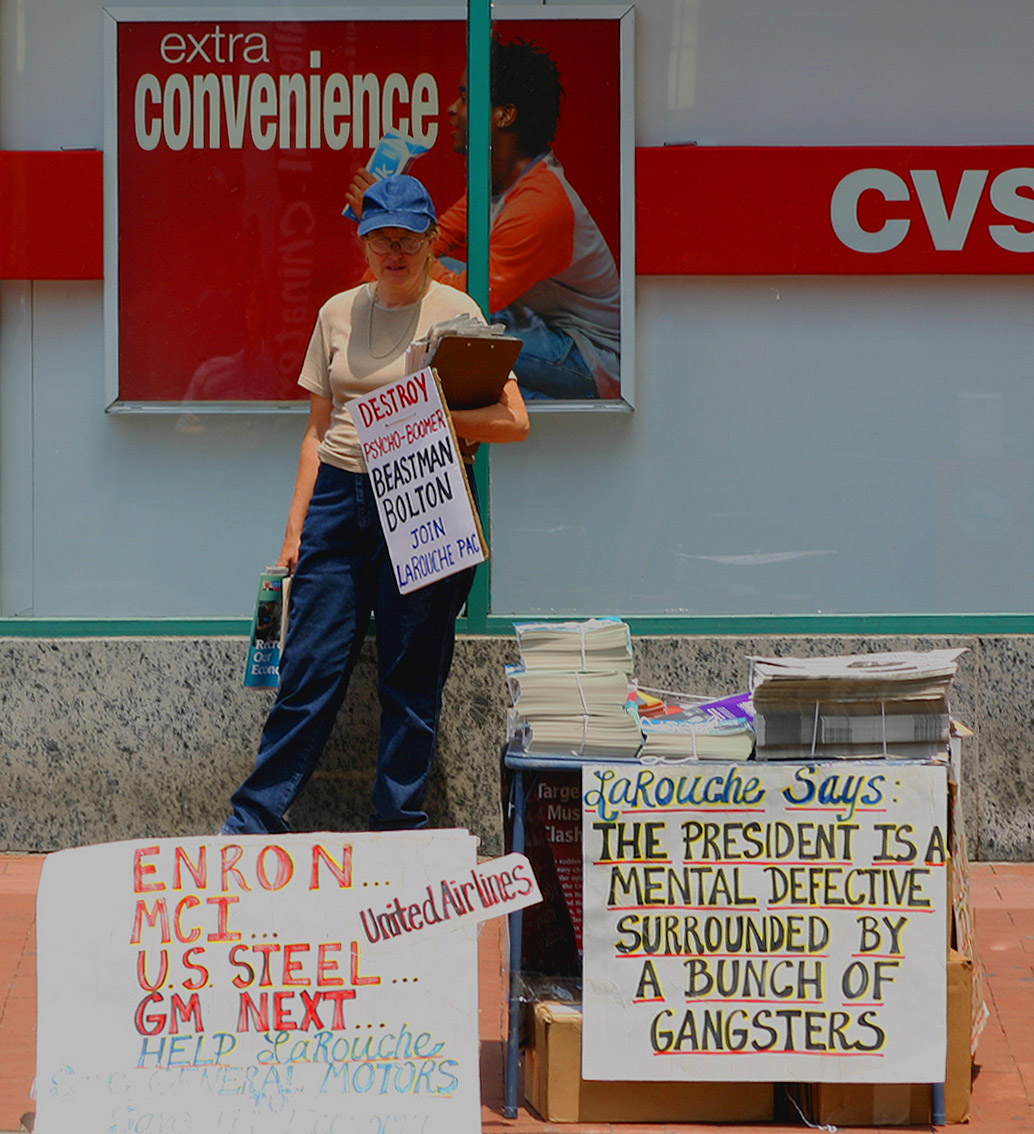
LaRouche supporter in Washington, D.C., 2005

LaRouche ran for U.S. president eight times, in every presidential election from 1976 to 2004. The first was with the U.S. Labor Party. In the next seven campaigns he ran for the Democratic Party nomination. He received federal matching funds in 2004. LaRouche candidates who ran in various Democratic primaries, generally sought George Wallace voters.

The LaRouche movement attracted media attention in the context of the 1986 Illinois gubernatorial election, when movement members Janice Hart and Mark J. Fairchild won the Democratic Primary elections for the offices of Illinois Secretary of State and Illinois Lieutenant Governor respectively. Until the day after the primary, major media outlets were reporting that George Sangmeister, Fairchild's primary opponent, was running unopposed. More than two decades later, Fairchild asked, "how is it possible that the major media, with all of their access to information, could possibly be mistaken in that way?" Democratic gubernatorial candidate Adlai Stevenson III was favored to win this election, having lost the previous election by a narrow margin. He refused to run on the same slate with Hart and Fairchild, forming the Solidarity Party and running with Jane Spirgel as the Secretary of State nominee. Hart and Spirgel's opponent, Republican incumbent James R. Thompson, won the election with 1.574 million votes.

After that primary, Senator Daniel Patrick Moynihan (D-NY) accused his own party of pursuing a policy of ignoring the "infiltration by the neo-Nazi elements of Lyndon H. LaRouche", and said that too often, especially in the media, "the LaRouchites" are "dismissed as kooks". "In an age of ideology, in an age of totalitarianism, it will not suffice for a political party to be indifferent to and ignorant about such a movement", said Moynihan. Moynihan had faced a primary challenge in 1982 from Mel Klenetsky, an associate of LaRouche.

In 1986, the LaRouche movement worked to place an AIDS initiative, Proposition 64, on the California ballot, which lost by a 4–1 margin. It was re-introduced in 1988 and lost again by the same margin.

Federal and state officials raided movement offices in 1986. In the ensuing trials, some leaders of the movement received prison terms for conspiracy to commit fraud, mail fraud, and tax evasion.

In 1988, Claude Jones won the chairmanship of the Harris County Democratic Party in Houston, and was stripped of his authority by the county executive committee before he could take office. He was removed from office by the state party chairman a few months later, in February 1989, because of Jones's alleged opposition to the Democratic presidential candidate, Michael Dukakis, in favor of LaRouche.

The LaRouche movement opposed the UN sanctions against Iraq in 1991 and the Gulf War in 1991. Supporters formed the "Committee to Save the Children in Iraq". LaRouche blamed the sanctions and war on "Israeli-controlled Moslem fundamentalist groups" and the "Ariel Sharon-dominated government of Israel" whose policies were "dictated by Kissinger and company, through the Hollinger Corporation, which has taken over The Jerusalem Post for that purpose." Left-wing anti-war groups were divided over the LaRouche movement's involvement.

In the United States Senate election in Wyoming, 2000, the Democratic Senatorial nominee, Mel Logan, was a LaRouche follower; the Republican incumbent, Craig Thomas, won in a 76–23% landslide. In 2001, a "national citizen-candidates' movement" was created, advancing candidates for a number of elective offices across the country.

In 2006, LaRouche Youth Movement activist and Los Angeles County Democratic Central Committee member Cody Jones was honored as "Democrat of the Year" for the 43rd Assembly District of California, by the Los Angeles County Democratic Party. At the April 2007 California State Democratic Convention, LYM activist Quincy O'Neal was elected vice-chairman of the California State Democratic Black Caucus, and Wynneal Innocentes was elected corresponding secretary of the Filipino Caucus.

In November 2007, Mark Fairchild returned to Illinois to promote legislation authored by LaRouche, called the "Homeowners and Bank Protection Act of 2007", establishing a moratorium on home foreclosures and establishing a new federal agency to oversee all federal and state banks. He also promoted LaRouche's plan to build a high-speed railroad to connect Russia and the United States, including a tunnel under the Bering Strait.

In 2009, a volunteer table in Mattituck, New York had a picture of Obama with a "drawn-in Hitler moustache" and "a picture of Speaker of the House Nancy Pelosi with Frankenstein-style bolts in her head." In July 2011, Seattle police were called by a LaRouche volunteer displaying "Obama with a Hitler-style mustache" picture at her stand, regarding a LaRouche opponent allegedly telling her "Look at me again and I'm going to punch your face." In another case, in June 2011, "the same officer was called to investigate an incident in which a man threatened to rip down several political signs displayed by LaRouche supporters." Police investigated the incident as malicious harassment – the state's hate-crime law. At one widely reported event, Congressman Barney Frank referred to the posters as "vile, contemptible nonsense."

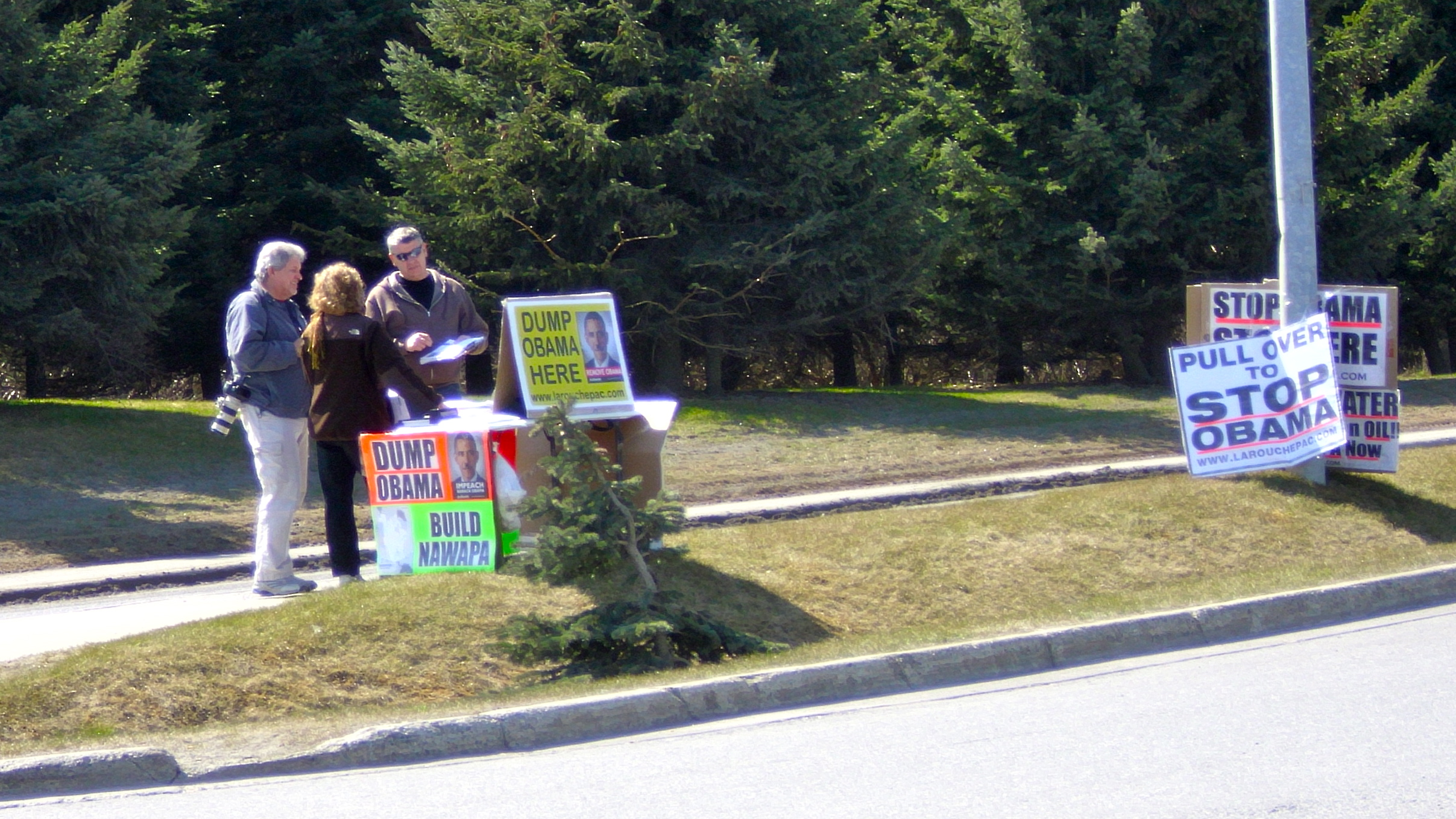
LaRouche supporters in Homer, Alaska, May 2012

In March 2010, LaRouche Youth leader Kesha Rogers won the Democratic congressional primary in Houston, Texas' 22nd District. The following day, a spokeswoman for the Texas Democratic Party stated that "La Rouche members are not Democrats. I guarantee her campaign will not receive a single dollar from anyone on our staff." In June 2012, Rogers won the Democratic congressional primary for a second time. In March 2014, Rogers received 22% of the vote in the U.S. Senate Democratic primary, placing her into a runoff election with David M. Alameel.

=== International ===
The Schiller Institute and the International Caucus of Labor Committees (ICLC) are international organizations associated by some with the LaRouche Movement. Schiller Institute conferences have been held across the world. The ICLC is affiliated to political parties in France, Italy, Germany, Poland, Hungary, Russia, Denmark, Sweden, Mexico, the Philippines, and several South American countries. Lyndon LaRouche, who was based in Loudoun County, Virginia, United States, and his wife, Helga Zepp-LaRouche, based in Wiesbaden, Germany, regularly attended these international conferences and met foreign politicians, bureaucrats, and academics.

According to London-based SciDev.Net, the LaRouche movement has "attracted suspicion for circulating conspiracy theories and advocating for grand infrastructure projects." The movement supports the Transaqua project to divert water from the Congo River to replenish Lake Chad.

==== Canada ====
The North American Labour Party (NALP) nominated candidates in federal elections in the 1970s. Its candidates only had 297 votes nationwide in 1979. LaRouche himself offered a draft constitution for the commonwealth of Canada in 1981. The NALP later became the Party for the Commonwealth of Canada and that ran candidates in the 1984, 1988 and 1993 elections. Those were more successful, gaining as many as 7,502 votes in 1993, but no seats. The Parti pour la république du Canada (Québec) nominated candidates for provincial elections in the 1980s under various party titles. The LaRouche affiliate now operates as the Committee for the Republic of Canada.

==== Europe ====
The LaRouche Movement has a major center in Germany. The Bürgerrechtsbewegung Solidarität (BüSo) (Civil Rights Movement Solidarity) political party is headed by Helga Zepp-LaRouche, LaRouche's widow. It has nominated candidates for elective office and publishes the Neue Solidarität newspaper. Zepp-LaRouche is also the head of the German-based Schiller Institute. In 1986, Zepp-LaRouche formed the "Patriots for Germany" party, and announced that it would run a full slate of 100 candidates. The party received 0.2 percent of the 4 million votes and "failed to elect any candidates to the parliament".

Solidarité et progrès (Solidarity and Progress), headed by Jacques Cheminade, is the LaRouche party in France. The party was previously known as Parti ouvrier européen (European Workers' Party) and Fédération pour une nouvelle solidarité (Federation for a New Solidarity). Its newspaper is Nouvelle Solidarité. Cheminade ran for President of France in 1995, 2012 and 2017, finishing last each time. The French LaRouche Youth Movement is headed by Élodie Viennot. Viennot supported the candidacy of Daniel Buchmann for the position of mayor of Berlin.

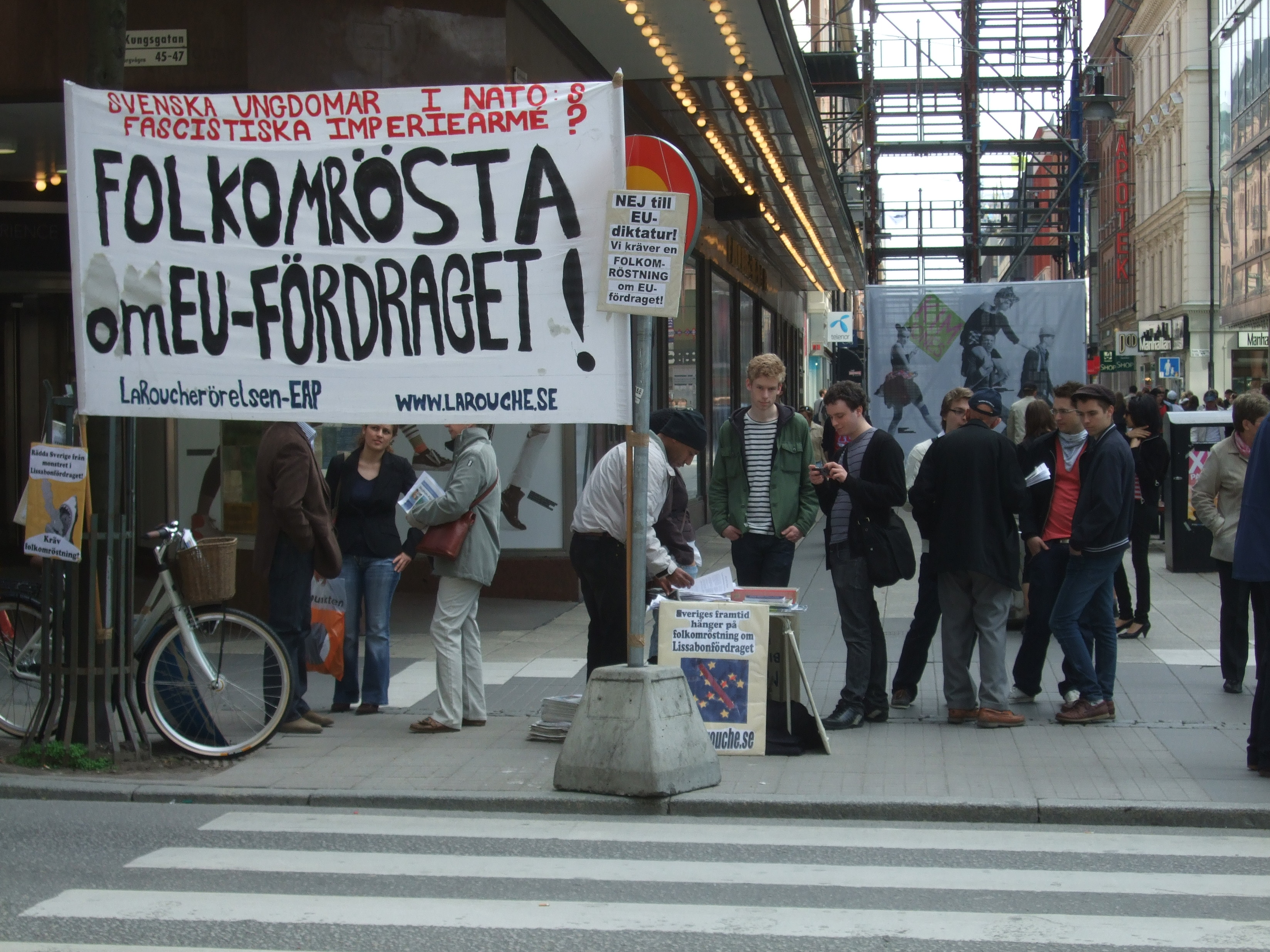
LaRouche supporters in Stockholm protesting against the Treaty of Lisbon

Sweden has an office of the Schiller Institute (Schillerinstitutet) and the political party European Workers Party (EAP).

In Denmark, four candidates for parliament on the LaRouche platform (Tom Gillesberg, Feride Istogu Gillesberg and Hans Schultz) received 197 votes in the 2007 election (at least 32,000 votes are needed for a local mandate). The Danish LaRouche Movement (Schiller Instituttet)'s first newspaper distributed 50,000 copies around Copenhagen and Aarhus.

The Movimento Solidarietà – Associazione di LaRouche in Italia (MSA) is an Italian political party headed by Paolo Raimondi that supports the LaRouche platform.

Ortrun Cramer of the Schiller Institute became a delegate of the Austrian International Progress Organization in the 1990s, but there is no sign of ongoing relationship.

Nataliya Vitrenko, leader of the Progressive Socialist Party of Ukraine, has stated multiple times that she supports LaRouche's ideals.

== Controversy ==
The LaRouche movement has been accused of violence, harassment, and heckling since the 1970s.

On February 24, 2021, Zepp-LaRouche denounced the LaRouche Political Action Committee (LPAC) and its treasurer, Barbara Boyd, for going "in a direction which I consider contrary to the central policies that my husband stood for. ... [S]ince he passed away in February 2019, Mrs. Boyd and her associates ... have embarked on a path that I believe misrepresents both my and Mr. LaRouche's positions." and has stated that LPAC and Boyd do not represent the LaRouche movement. She has taken legal action against LPAC to "immediately cease and desist, both now and in the future" from "using Mr. LaRouche's name, likeness, and potentially other confusingly similar terms."

=== 1960s and Operation Mop-Up ===
In the 1960s and 1970s, LaRouche was accused of fomenting violence at anti-war rallies with a small band of followers. According to LaRouche's autobiography, it was in 1969 that violent altercations began between his members and New Left groups. He wrote that a faction of Students for a Democratic Society which later became the Weathermen began assaulting LaRouche's faction at Columbia University, and there were later attacks by the Communist Party, and the SWP. These conflicts culminated in "Operation Mop-Up", a series of physical attacks by LaRouche's National Caucus of Labor Committees (NCLC) on rival left-wing groups. LaRouche's New Solidarity reported NCLC confrontations with members of the Communist Party and Socialist Workers Party, including an April 23, 1973 incident at a debate featuring Labor Committee mayoral candidate Tony Chaitkin that erupted in a brawl, with chairs flying. Six people were treated for injuries at a local hospital.

In the mid-1973 the movement formed a "Revolutionary Youth Movement" to recruit and politicize members of street gangs in New York City and other eastern cities. The NCLC allegedly trained some members in terrorist and guerrilla warfare. Topics included weapons handling, explosives and demolition, close order drills, small unit tactics, and military history.

=== The USLP vs. the FBI ===
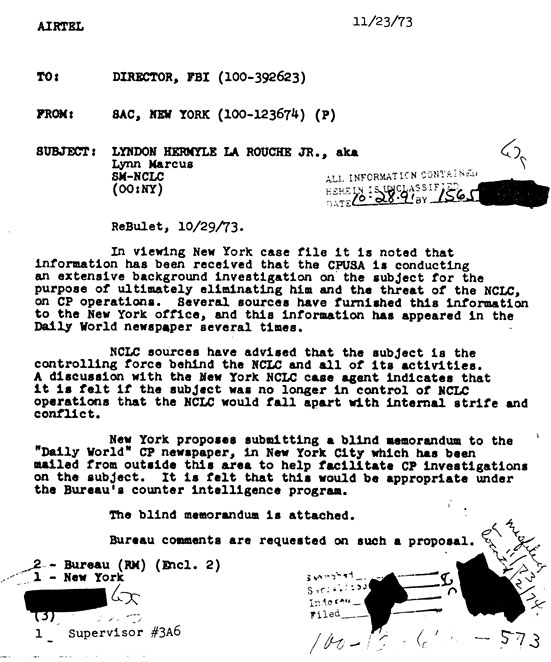
A 1973 internal FBI letter recommended that the FBI provide anonymous aid to a background investigation by the Communist Party USA.

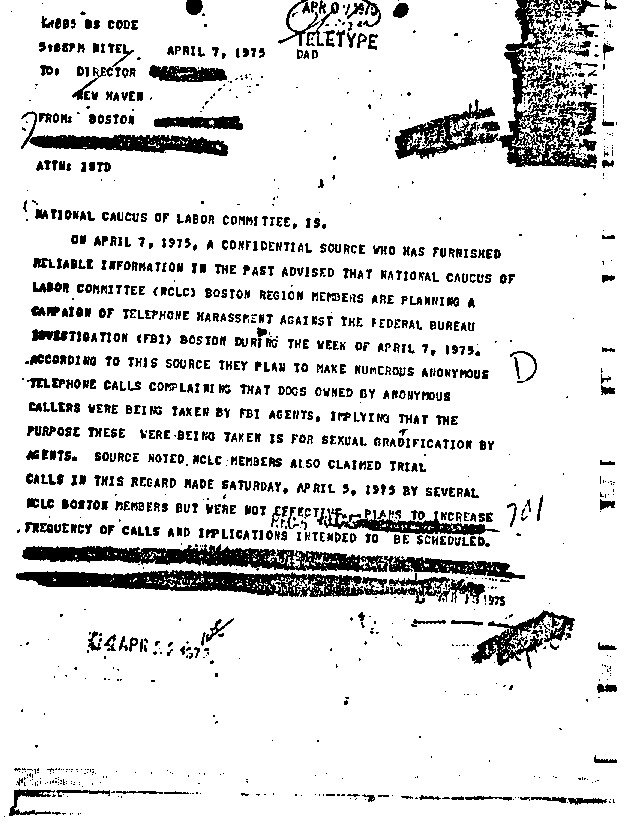
Internal FBI memo from 1975 warning about harassment of agents by NCLC members

In November 1973, the FBI issued an internal memorandum, later released under the Freedom of Information Act. Jeffrey Steinberg, the NCLC "director of counterintelligence", described it as the "COINTELPRO memo", which he says showed "that the FBI was considering supporting an assassination attempt against LaRouche by the Communist Party USA." LaRouche wrote in 1998:

The U.S. Communist Party was committed to putting the Labor Committees out of existence physically... Local law enforcement was curiously uncooperative, as they had been during prior physical attacks on myself and my friends. We knew that a 'fix' was in somewhere, probably from the FBI... We were left to our own resources. Tired of the beatings, we decided we had better prepare to defend ourselves if necessary.

The FBI was allegedly concerned that the movement might try to take power by force. FBI Director Clarence Kelly testified in 1976 about the LaRouche movement:

A "violence-oriented organization of 'revolutionary socialists' with a membership of nearly 1,000 located in chapters in some 50 cities ... involved in fights, beatings, using drugs, kidnappings, brainwashings, and at least one shooting. They are reported to be armed, to have received defensive training such as karate, and to attend cadre schools and training schools to learn military tactics..."

=== Association with Roy Frankhouser and Mitch WerBell ===
In the later 1970s, the U.S. Labor Party came into contact with Roy Frankhouser, a felon and government informant who had infiltrated a variety of groups. The LaRouche organization believed Frankhouser was a federal agent assigned to infiltrate right-wing and left-wing groups, and that he had evidence that these groups were being manipulated or controlled by the FBI and other agencies. Frankhouser introduced LaRouche to Mitchell WerBell III, a former Office of Strategic Services operative, paramilitary trainer, and arms dealer. Some members allegedly took a six-day "anti-terrorist" course at a training camp operated by WerBell in Powder Springs, Georgia. In 1979, LaRouche denied that the training sessions took place. WerBell introduced LaRouche to covert operations specialist General John K. Singlaub, who later said that members of the movement implied in discussions with him that the military might help "lead the country out of its problems", a view which he rejected. WerBell also introduced LaRouche to Larry Cooper, a Powder Springs, Georgia police captain. Cooper, Frankhouser and an associate of Frankhouser named Forrest Lee Fick later made allegations about LaRouche. Cooper said in an NBC broadcast interview in 1984 that LaRouche had proposed the assassination of Jimmy Carter, Zbigniew Brzezinski, Joseph Luns, and David Rockefeller. In 1984, LaRouche said that he had employed WerBell as a security consultant, but that the allegations coming from Werbell's circle were fabrications that originated with operatives of the FBI and other agencies.

=== Labor unions ===
In 1974 and 1975, the NCLC allegedly targeted the United Auto Workers (UAW), United Farm Workers (UFW), and other trade unionists. They dubbed their campaign "Operation Mop Up Woodcock", a reference to their anti-communist campaign of 1973 and to UAW president Leonard Woodcock. The movement staged demonstrations that allegedly turned violent. They issued pamphlets attacking the leadership as corrupt and perverted. The UAW said that members had received dozens of calls a day accusing their relatives of homosexuality, reportedly at the direction of NCLC "security staff". Leaflets called an Ohio local president a "Woodcocksucker". The leadership of the AFL–CIO was also attacked. During the same period, the LaRouche movement was closely associated with the Teamsters union which was in a jurisdictional dispute with the UFW.

=== 1980 New Hampshire presidential primary ===
LaRouche put substantial effort into his first Democratic Primary, held February 1980 in New Hampshire. Reporters, campaign workers, and party officials received calls from people impersonating reporters or ADL staff members, inquiring what "bad news" they had heard about LaRouche. LaRouche acknowledged that his campaign workers used impersonation to collect information on political opponents. Governor Hugh Gallen, State Attorney General Thomas Rath and other officials received harassing phone calls. Their names appeared on a photocopied "New Hampshire Target List" acquired by the Associated Press, found in a LaRouche campaign worker's hotel room; the list stated, "these are the criminals to burn – we want calls coming in to these fellows day and night". LaRouche spokesman Ted Andromidas said, "We did choose to target those people for political pressure hopefully to prevent them from carrying out the kind of fraud that occurred in Tuesday's election." New Hampshire journalist Jon Prestage said he was threatened after a tense interview with LaRouche and his associates, and found several of his cats dead after he published an account of the meeting. A LaRouche associate denied responsibility for the dead cats.

=== Political opponents ===
According to courtroom testimony by FBI agent Richard Egan, Jeffrey and Michelle Steinberg, the heads of LaRouche's security unit, boasted of placing harassing phone calls all through the night to the general counsel of the Federal Elections Commission (FEC) when the FEC was investigating LaRouche's political contributions.

During the grand jury hearings, followers picketed the courthouse, distributed leaflets accusing U.S. Attorney Bill Weld of involvement in drug dealing, "sang a jingle advocating that he be hanged in public" and chanted "Weld is a fag".

The Schiller Institute sent a team of ten people, headed by James Bevel, to Omaha, Nebraska, to pursue the Franklin child prostitution ring allegations in 1990. Among the charges investigated by the grand jury was that the Omaha Police Chief Robert Wadman and other men had sex with a 15-year-old girl at a party held by the bank's owner. The LaRouche groups insisted there was a cover-up. They distributed copies of the Schiller Institute's New Federalist newspaper and went door-to-door in Wadman's neighborhood, telling residents he was a child molester. When Wadman took a job with the police department in Aurora, Illinois, LaRouche followers went there to demand he be fired, and after he left there followed him to a third city to make accusations.

In the 1970s, Nelson Rockefeller was a central figure in the movement's theories. An FBI file described them as a "clandestinely oriented group of political schizophrenics who have a paranoid preoccupation with Nelson Rockefeller and the CIA." The movement strongly opposed Rockefeller's nomination for U.S. vice president and heckled his appearances. Federal authorities were reportedly concerned that the situation might turn violent.

One target of LaRouche's attention has been Henry Kissinger. LaRouche allegedly has called Kissinger a "faggot", a "traitor", a British or Soviet agent and a "Nazi", and has linked him to the murder of Aldo Moro. His followers heckled and disrupted Kissinger's appearances. In 1982, a member of LaRouche's Fusion Energy Foundation, Ellen Kaplan, asked Kissinger at an airport terminal if it were true that he slept with young boys; Kissinger and his wife, Nancy, were on their way to a heart operation. In response, Nancy Kissinger grabbed the woman by the throat. Kaplan pressed charges and the case went to trial. In 1986, Janice Hart held a press conference to say that Kissinger was part of the international "drug mafia". Asked whether Jews were behind drug trafficking Hart replied, "That's totally nonsense. I don't consider Henry Kissinger a Jew. I consider Henry Kissinger a homosexual."

A LaRouche organization sold posters of Illinois politician Jane Byrne described by Mike Royko as "border(ing) on the pornographic." In 1986, two LaRouche candidates, Janice Hart and Mark Fairchild, won in the Democratic primaries for two statewide positions in Illinois, Secretary of State and Lieutenant Governor. Campaign appearances by Democratic gubernatorial candidate Adlai Stevenson III, who refused to share the ticket with them and shifted instead to the "Solidarity Party" formed for the purpose, were interrupted by a trio of singers that included Fairchild and Chicago Mayoral candidate Sheila Jones. Illinois Attorney General Neil Hartigan's home was visited late at night by a group of LaRouche followers who chanted, sang, and used a bullhorn "to exorcise the demons out of Neil Hartigan's soul". Before the primaries a group of LaRouche supporters reportedly stormed the campaign offices of Hart's opponent and demanded that a worker "take an AIDS test".

In 1984, a reporter for a LaRouche publication buttonholed President Ronald Reagan as he was leaving a White House press conference, demanding to know why LaRouche was not receiving Secret Service protection. As a result, future press conferences in the East Room were arranged with the door behind the president so he can leave without passing through the reporters. In 1992, a follower shook hands with President George H. W. Bush at a campaign visit to a shopping center. The follower would not let go, demanding to know, "When are you going to let LaRouche out of jail?" The Secret Service had to intervene.

During the 1988 presidential campaign, LaRouche activists spread a rumor that the Democratic candidate, Massachusetts Governor Michael Dukakis, had received professional treatment for two episodes of mental depression. Media sources did not report the rumor initially to avoid validating it. However, at a press conference a reporter for a LaRouche publication, Nicholas Benton, asked President Reagan whether Dukakis should release his medical records. Reagan replied "Look, I'm not going to pick on an invalid." Within an hour after the press conference Reagan apologized for the joke. The question received wide publicity, and was later analyzed as an example of how journalists should handle rumors. Republican candidate Vice President George H. W. Bush's aides got involved in sustaining the story, and Dukakis was obliged to deny having had depression. To avoid the negative backlash on his own campaign, Bush made a statement urging Congress to pass the Americans with Disabilities Act, which he signed upon gaining office and which became one of his proudest legacies.

At a 2003 Democratic primary debate repeatedly interrupted by hecklers, Joe Lieberman quoted John McCain, "no one's been elected since 1972 that Lyndon LaRouche and his people have not protested". The first reported incidence of heckling by LaRouche followers was at the Watergate hearings in 1973. Since then, LaRouche followers have repeatedly disrupted speaking events and debates featuring a large variety of speakers. (Note: Examples include: J. Bowyer Bell, Andrew Bernstein, Julian Bond, Jerry Brown, Richard R. Burt, George H. W. Bush, George W. Bush, Jimmy Carter, Wesley K. Clark, Howard Dean, John Edwards, Bob Kerrey, John Kerry, Lawrence Klein, Richard Lamm, Joseph Lieberman, Sir Robert Mark, Paul Martin, Walter Mondale, Ralph Nader, Oliver North, Ross Perot, Rick Santorum, Paul A. Volcker, and Leonard Woodcock.)

=== Conflict with journalists ===
In the 1980s, journalists including Joe Klein and Chuck Fager from Boston's alternative weekly, The Real Paper, and Chicago Tribune columnist Mike Royko alleged harassment and intimidation by LaRouche groups. After Royko wrote about a LaRouche organization, Royko said that leaflets appeared, alleging he had had a sex-change operation. He also said his assistant found a note with a bullseye and a threat to kill her cat on her door; Also according to Royko, LaRouche supporters picketed the newspaper offices, calling Royko a "degenerate drug pusher" and demanding he take an AIDS test. LaRouche supporters denied such charges, saying they were part of a campaign against them by the "drug lobby."

In 1984, Patricia Lynch co-produced an NBC news piece and a TV documentary on LaRouche. She was then impersonated by LaRouche followers who interfered with her reporting. LaRouche sued Lynch and NBC for libel, and NBC countersued. During the trial followers picketed the NBC's offices with signs that said "Lynch Pat Lynch", and the NBC switchboard received a death threat. A LaRouche spokesman said they had no knowledge of the death threat. An editor of the Centre Daily Times in State College, Pennsylvania reported that a LaRouche TV crew led by Stanley Ezrol talked their way into his house in 1985 implying they were with NBC, then accused him of harassing LaRouche and producing unduly negative coverage. At the end of the interview, Ezrol allegedly asked, "Have you ever feared for your personal safety?", which the editor found to be "chilling". Another LaRouche group, including Janice Hart, forced their way into the office of The Des Moines Register's editor in 1987, haranguing him over his paper's coverage of LaRouche and demanding that certain editorials be retracted.

Dennis King began covering LaRouche in the 1970s, publishing a twelve-part series in a weekly Manhattan newspaper, Our Town, and later writing or cowriting articles about LaRouche in New Republic, High Times, Columbia Journalism Review, and other periodicals, culminating in a full-length biography published in 1989. King alleges numerous instances of anonymous harassment and threats. Leaflets appeared from the NCLC accusing King, a newspaper publisher, and Roy Cohn, the newspaper's lawyer, of being criminals, homosexuals, or drug pushers. One leaflet included King's home address and phone number. In 1984, a LaRouche newspaper, New Solidarity, published an article titled "Will Dennis King Come out of the Closet?", copies of which were distributed in his apartment building. Jeffrey Steinberg denied the movement had harassed King. LaRouche said that King had been "monitored" since 1979, "We have watched this little scoundrel because he is a major security threat to my life."

=== Public altercations ===
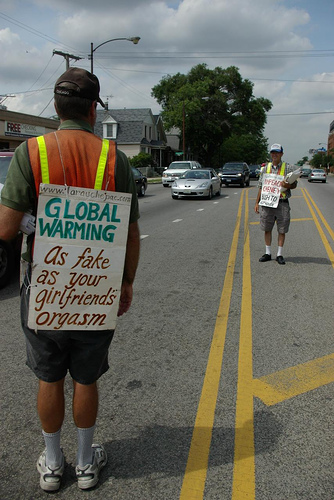
LaRouche supporters in Chicago, 2007

From the 1970s to the 2000s, LaRouche followers have staffed tables in airports and other public areas. The tables have carried posters with topical slogans. LaRouche followers have been alleged to use a confrontational style of interaction. In 1986, the New York state elections board received dozens of complaints about people collecting signatures on nomination petitions, including allegations of misrepresentation and abusive language used towards those who would not sign.

In the mid-80s, the Secretary of State of California, March Fong Eu, received complaints from the public about harassment by people gathering signatures to qualify the "LaRouche AIDS Initiative" for the state ballot. She warned initiative sponsors that permission to circulate the petitions could be revoked unless the "offensive activities" stopped. An altercation in 1987 between a LaRouche activist and an AIDS worker resulted in battery charges filed against the latter, who was outraged by the content of some of the material on display; she was found not guilty.

In California in 2009, several grocery chains sought restraining orders, damages and injunctions against LaRouche PAC activists displaying materials related to Obama's health care plan in front of their stores, citing customer complaints. In Edmonds, Washington, a 70-year-old man from Armenia, grew irate at what he viewed as comparisons of Obama to Hitler. He grabbed fliers and tussled with LaRouche supporters, resulting in assault charges against him.

=== Latin America ===
Brazil's Party for Rebuilding of National Order (Prona) was described as a "LaRouche friend" and one of its members has been quoted in the Executive Intelligence Review as saying "We associate ourselves with the wave of ideas which flow from Mr. LaRouche's prodigious mind". Prona gained six seats in the Chamber of Deputies in 2002. After gaining two seats in the 2006 election, the party merged with the larger Liberal Party forming the Republic Party. However, there is no independent evidence that Prona or its leaders recognized LaRouche as an influence on their policies, and it has been described as being part of the right-wing Catholic integralist political tradition.

The Ibero-American Solidarity Movement (MSIA) has been described as an offshoot of LaRouche's Labor Party in Mexico. During peace talks to resolve the Chiapas conflict, the Mexican Labor Party and the MSIA attacked the peace process and one of the leading negotiators, Bishop Samuel Ruiz García, whom it accused of fomenting the violence and of being controlled by foreigners. Posters caricaturing Ruiz as a rattlesnake appeared across the country.

The movement strongly opposes perceived manifestations of neo-colonialism, including the International Monetary Fund, the Falklands/Malvinas War, etc., and are advocates of the Monroe Doctrine.

=== Australia ===
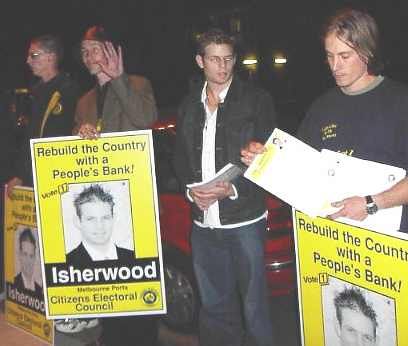
CEC members campaigning for Aaron Isherwood (center)

LaRouche supporters gained control of the formerly far-right Citizens Electoral Council (CEC) in the mid-1990s. The CEC publishes an irregular newspaper, The New Citizen. Craig Isherwood and his spouse Noelene Isherwood are the leaders of the party.

In 2000, former Labor MP Adrian Bennett established the Curtin Labor Alliance, a LaRouchite political party formed as a joint venture of the CEC and the Municipal Employees Union of Western Australia. In a speech to its inaugural conference, Bennett predicted an imminent global financial collapse and described Lyndon LaRouche as the "world's leading economist", and attributing the LaRouche criminal trials to a conspiracy by the "global oligarchy".

The CEC opposed politician Michael Danby and the 2004 Australian anti-terrorism legislation. For the 2004 federal election, it nominated people for ninety-five seats, collected millions of dollars in contributions, and earned 34,177 votes. The CEC is concerned with Hamiltonian economics and development ideas for Australia. It has been critical of Queen Elizabeth II's ownership of an Australian zinc mine and believes that she exerted control over Australian politics through the use of prerogative power. It has been in an antagonistic relationship with the B'nai B'rith's Anti-Defamation Commission, which has been critical of the CEC for perceived anti-semitism. The CEC also says it is fighting for "real" Labor policies (from the 1930–40s republican leanings of the Australian Labor Party).

=== Europe ===
In Germany, the leader of the Green Party, Petra Kelly, reported receiving harassing phone calls that she attributed to BüSo supporters. Her speeches were picketed and disrupted by LaRouche followers for years.

Jeremiah Duggan, a student from the UK attending a conference organized by the Schiller Institute and LaRouche Youth Movement in 2003, died in Wiesbaden, Germany, after he ran down a busy road and was hit by several cars. The German police said it appeared to be suicide. A British court ruled that Duggan had died while "in a state of terror." Duggan's mother believes he died in connection with an attempt to recruit him. The German public prosecution service said her son committed suicide. The High Court in London ordered a second inquest in May 2010, which was opened and adjourned. In 2015, a British coroner rejected the suicide verdict and found that Duggan's body bore unexplained injuries which indicated an "altercation at some stage before his death."

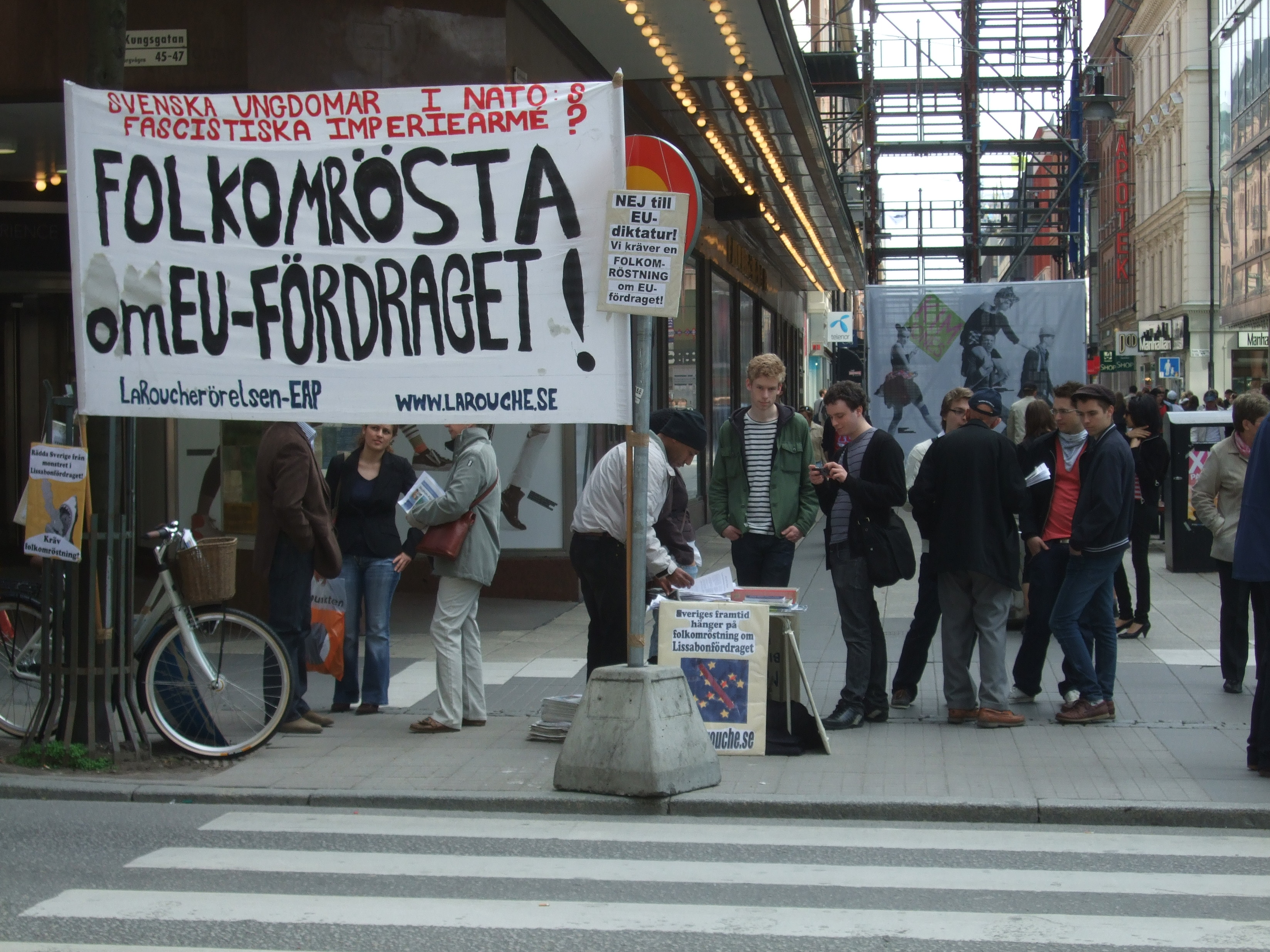
LaRouche supporters in Stockholm protesting against the Treaty of Lisbon

In Sweden, the former leader of the European Workers Party (EAP), Ulf Sandmark, started as a member of the Swedish Social Democratic Youth League (SSU), and was assigned to investigate the EAP and the ELC. After joining the EAP, he had his membership in SSU revoked. Following the Olof Palme assassination on February 28, 1986, the Swedish branch of the EAP came under scrutiny as literature published by the party was found in the apartment of the initial suspect, Victor Gunnarsson. Soon after the assassination, NBC television in the U.S. speculated that LaRouche was somehow responsible. Later, the suspect was released. No connection with LaRouche was shown.

Polish newspapers have reported that Andrzej Lepper, leader of the populist Samoobrona party, was trained at the Schiller Institute and has received funding from LaRouche, though both Lepper and LaRouche deny the connection.

In February 2008, the LaRouche movement in Europe began a campaign to prevent the ratification of the Treaty of Lisbon, which, according to the U.S.-based LaRouche Political Action Committee, "empowers a supranational financial elite to take over the right of taxation and war making, and even restore the death penalty, abolished in most nations of Western Europe." LaRouche press releases suggest that the treaty has an underlying fascist agenda, based on the "Europe a Nation" ideas of Sir Oswald Mosley.

=== Asia, Middle East and Africa ===
The Philippines LaRouche Society calls for fixed exchange rates, US/Philippine withdrawal from Iraq, denunciation of former US Vice President Dick Cheney, and withdrawal of U.S. military advisors from Mindanao. In 2008 it also issued calls for the freezing of foreign debt payments, the operation of the Bataan Nuclear Power Plant, and the immediate implementation of a national food production program. It has an office in Manila, operates a radio show and says on its website, "Lyndon LaRouche is our civilization's last chance at world peace and development. May God help us." On the matter of internal politics, LaRouche operative Mike Billington wrote in 2004, "The Philippines Catholic Church, too, is divided at the top over the crisis. The Church under Cardinal [Jaime] Sin, who is now retired, had given its full support to the 'people's power' charade for the overthrow of Marcos and Estrada, but other voices are heard today." Later that year, he wrote:

The U.S.-orchestrated coup which overthrew the government of Philippines' President Ferdinand Marcos in 1986 was a classic case study of what John Perkins describes in his recent book, Confessions of an Economic Hit Man, as the post-World War II preferred method of imposing colonial control under another name. In the Philippines case, George Shultz performed the roles of both the economic hit man, destroying and taking full control of the Philippine economy, and the coup-master, deposing the Philippine President in favor of an IMF puppet – while calling the operation 'people power.'

According to Billington, representatives of LaRouche's Executive Intelligence Review and Schiller Institute had met with Marcos in 1985, at which time LaRouche was warning that Marcos would be the target of a coup, inspired by George Shultz and neoconservatives in the Reagan administration, because of Marcos' opposition to the policies of the International Monetary Fund. In 1986, LaRouche asserted that Marcos was ousted because he hadn't listened to LaRouche's advice: "he was opposed to me and he fell as a result."

The LaRouche movement is reported to have had close ties to the Ba'ath Party of Iraq. In 1997, the LaRouche movement, and the Schiller Institute in particular, were reported to have campaigned aggressively in support of the National Islamic Front government in Sudan. They organized trips to Sudan for state legislators, which according to The Christian Science Monitor was part of a campaign directed at African Americans.

The Lyndon LaRouche Political Action Committee (LaRouchePAC) has been vocal in its support for the construction of the Thai Canal across the Kra Isthmus of Thailand.

== Periodicals and news agencies ==
The LaRouche organization has an extensive network of print and online publications for research and advocacy purposes.

=== Executive Intelligence Review ===
The LaRouche movement maintains its own press service, Executive Intelligence Review. According to its masthead, EIR maintains international bureaus in Bogotá, Berlin, Copenhagen, Lima, Melbourne, Mexico City, New Delhi, Paris, and Wiesbaden, in addition to various cities in the U.S.

=== Broadcast ===
In 1986, the LaRouche movement bought WTRI, a low-powered AM radio station that covered western Maryland, northern Virginia, and parts of West Virginia. It was sold in 1991.

In 1991, the LaRouche movement began producing The LaRouche Connection, a Public-access television cable TV program. Within ten months it was being carried in six states. Dana Scanlon, the producer, said that "We've done shows on the JFK assassination, the 'October Surprise' and shows on economic and cultural affairs".

=== Internet ===
In January 2001, LaRouche began holding regular webcasts every 1–2 months. These were public meetings, broadcast in video, where LaRouche gave a speech, followed by 1–2 hours of Q and A over the internet. The last occurred on December 18, 2003.

=== Other ===
- The New Federalist (U.S.), weekly newspaper
  - New Solidarity International Press Service (NSIPS)
  - NSIPS Speakers Bureau
  - Nouvelle Solidarité, French news agency
  - Neue Solidarität, published by Bürgerrechtsbewegung Solidarität in German
- Fidelio, a "Journal of Poetry, Science, and Statecraft", published quarterly by Schiller Institute
- 21st Century Science and Technology, a quarterly magazine covering scientific topics
- ΔΥΝΑΜΙΣ (Dynamis), the "Journal of the LaRouche Riemann method of physical economics"

=== Books and pamphlets ===
- LaRouche, Lyndon, The Power of Reason (1980) (autobiography)
- LaRouche, Lyndon, There Are No Limits to Growth (1983)
- LaRouche, Lyndon, So, You Wish To Learn All About Economics (1984)
- LaRouche, Lyndon, The Power of Reason 1988 (1988)
- LaRouche, Lyndon, The Science of Christian Economy (1991)

=== Defunct periodicals ===
- New Solidarity
- Fusion
- International Journal of Fusion Energy
- The Loudon County News
- Investigative Leads
- War on Drugs
- The Young Scientist
- Campaigner Magazine
- American Labor Beacon
- Middle East Insider

== Lawsuits ==
In 1979, the Anti-Defamation League (ADL) was sued by the U.S. Labor Party, the National Caucus of Labor Committees, and several individuals including Konstandinos Kalimtgis, Jeffrey Steinberg, and David Goldman, who claimed libel, slander, invasion of privacy, and assault on account of the ADL's accusations of anti-Semitism. A New York State Supreme Court judge ruled that it was "fair comment" to describe them as anti-Semites.

United States v. Kokinda was heard by the U.S. Supreme Court in 1990. The case concerned the First Amendment rights of LaRouche movement members on Post Office property. The Deputy Solicitor General arguing the government's case was future Supreme Court Chief Justice John G. Roberts. The Court confirmed the convictions of Marsha Kokinda and Kevin Pearl, volunteers for the National Democratic Policy Committee, finding that the Postal Service's regulation of solicitors was reasonable.

== Characterizations ==
According to a biography produced by the LaRouche-affiliated Schiller Institute, the movement is based on a commitment to "a just new world economic order", specifically "the urgency of affording what have been sometimes termed 'Third World nations,' their full rights to perfect national sovereignty, and to access to the improvement of their educational systems and economies through employment of the most advanced science and technology."

The LaRouche movement has often been considered a far-right political movement. The LaRouche movement has attracted devoted followers and developed some specific and elaborate policy initiatives but has also been referred to variously as formerly Marxist–Leninist in its beginnings during the 1960s, and since the 1970s as an American fascist, antisemitic, a political cult, a personality cult, and a criminal enterprise, reflecting LaRouche's shift from a left-wing Marxist to a right-wing anti-communist and American conservative. In 1984, LaRouche's research staff was described by Norman Bailey, a former senior staffer of the United States National Security Council, as "one of the best private intelligence services in the world". The Heritage Foundation called it "one of the strangest political groups in American history", and The Washington Monthly called it a "vast and bizarre vanity press". The LaRouche movement is also seen by some as a fringe political cult.

John Rees, a government informant resident in the United States who was active in the Western Goals Foundation and the John Birch Society, wrote in his Information Digest that the movement has "taken on the characteristics more of a political cult than a political party", and that LaRouche is given "blind obedience" by his followers. He has also called the movement a "cult of personality". In rebuttal, LaRouche called the accusations of being a cult figure "garbage", and denied having control over any of the groups affiliated with him. According to longtime critics Chip Berlet and Matthew N. Lyons:

Though often dismissed as a bizarre political cult, the LaRouche organization and its various front groups are a fascist movement whose pronouncements echo elements of Nazi ideology. Beginning in the 1970s, the LaRouchites combined populist antielitism with attacks on leftists, environmentalists, feminists, gay men and lesbians, and organized labor. They advocated a dictatorship in which a 'humanist' elite would rule on behalf of industrial capitalists. They developed an idiosyncratic, coded variation on the Illuminati Freemason and Jewish banker conspiracy theories. Their views, though exotic, were internally consistent and rooted in right-wing populist traditions.

In the summer of 2009, LaRouche followers came under criticism from both Democrats and Republicans for comparing the then United States president Barack Obama to Adolf Hitler. Media figures as politically diverse as Rush Limbaugh and Jon Stewart criticized the comparison.

== Organizations ==
=== Current organizations ===
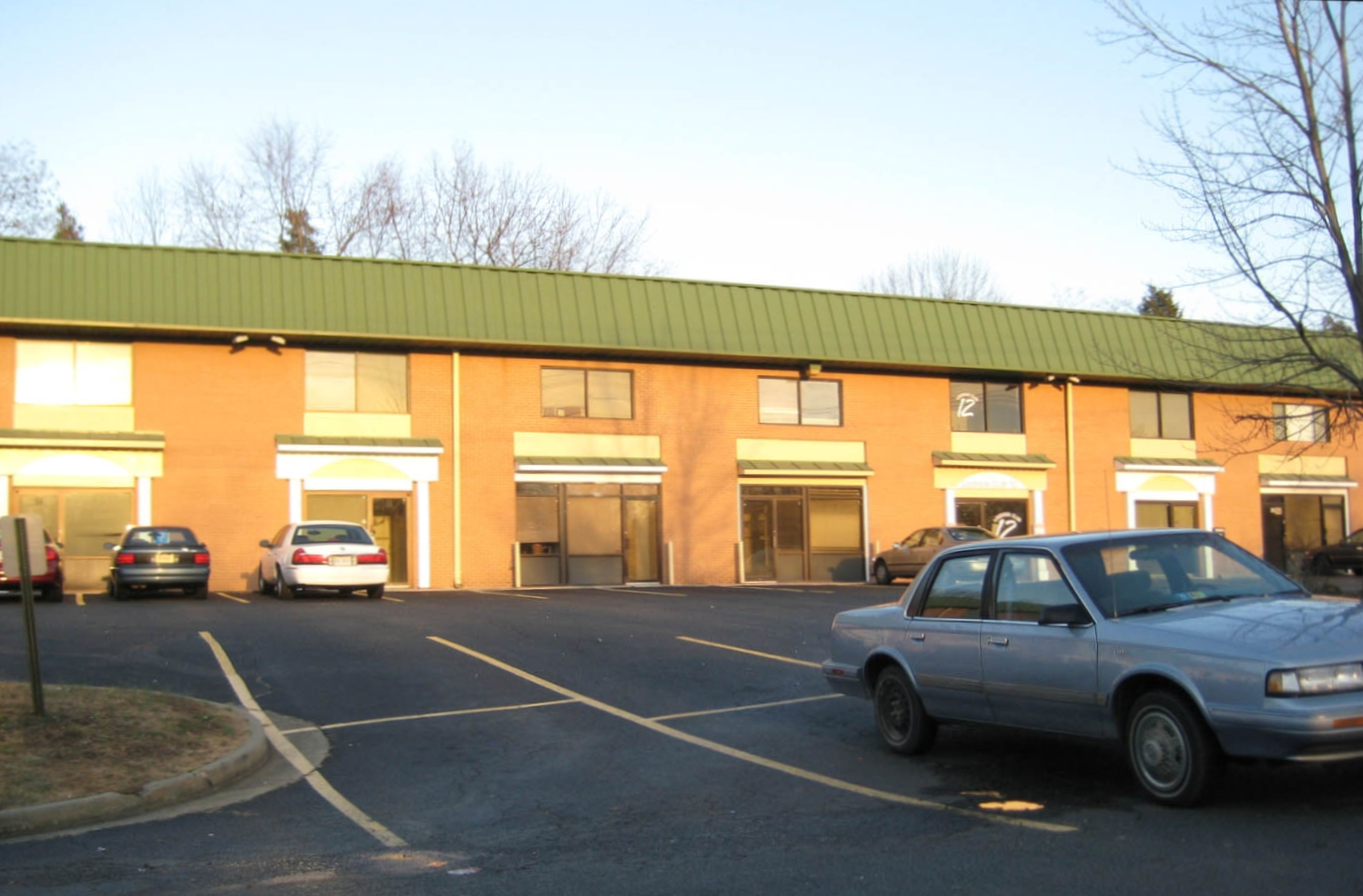
Offices of Executive Intelligence Review, LaRouche PAC, 21st Century Science & Technology and New Federalist

- Executive Intelligence Review Press Service (U.S.), a hub of the LaRouche movement
- National Caucus of Labor Committees (U.S.)
- Worldwide LaRouche Youth Movement (international)
- LaRouche Political Action Committee (U.S.)
- Schiller Institute (international, based in Germany and U.S.)
- Bürgerrechtsbewegung Solidarität (Germany)
- International Caucus of Labor Committees (international, especially Canada, Australia, and others)
- Australian Citizens Party formerly Citizens Electoral Council
- Philippine LaRouche Society
- European Workers Party (Sweden)
- Comités Laborales de Nuevo León (Mexico)
- Solidarité et progrès (France)

=== United States businesses ===
- PMR Printing, Virginia
- World Composition Services, Inc. (a.k.a. WorldComp) (Ken Kronberg, former president)
- New Benjamin Franklin House Publishing Company, Inc., Leesburg, Virginia
- American System Publications Inc., Los Angeles (Maureen Calney, president)
- Eastern States Distributors Incorporated, Pittsburgh (Starr Valenti, president)
- South East Literature (South East Political Literature Sales & Distribution, Inc.) Halethorpe, Maryland
- Southwest Literature Distribution, Houston, Texas (Daniel Leach, president)
- Midwest Circulation Corp., Chicago
- Hamilton System Distributors, Inc., Ridgefield Park, New Jersey

=== Defunct organizations ===
- African Civil Rights Movement
- Campaigner Publications, Inc.
- Caucus Distributors, Inc.
- Citizens Fact Finding Commission to Investigate Human Rights Violations of Children in Nebraska
- Citizens for Chicago
- Club of Life
- Committee Against Genocide
- Committee for a Fair Election (CFE)
- Committee for a New Africa Policy
- Committee to Save the Children in Iraq
- Computron Technologies
- Computype (unrelated to other companies of same name)
- Constitutional Defense Fund
- European Workers Party (Germany)
- FDR PAC
- Food For Peace Movement
- Fusion Energy Foundation
- Hamilton Distribution Systems Inc.
- Human Rights Fund
- Humanist Academy
- Independent Democrats for LaRouche
- International Workingman's Association
- John Marshall Distributors
- Labor Organizers Defense Fund
- Lafayette Academy for the Arts and Sciences
- The LaRouche Campaign (TLC)
- LaRouche for President campaign committees
  - 1992 – Democrats for Economic Recovery – LaRouche in '92
  - 1996 – The Committee to Reverse the Accelerating Global Economic and Strategic Crisis: A LaRouche Exploratory Committee
  - 2000 – LaRouche's Committee for a New Bretton Woods
  - 2004 – LaRouche in 2004
- Leesburg Security Fund
- Los Angeles Labor Committee
- National Anti-Drug Coalition
- National Labor Committee to Defend Harrison Williams
- National Unemployed and Welfare Rights Organization (NUWRO)
- New Benjamin Franklin House Publishing Company
- North American Labour Party (Canada)
- Parti ouvrier européen (France)
- Parti pour la république du Canada (Québec)
- Party for the Commonwealth of Canada
- PANIC California Proposition 64 (1986)
- PANIC California Proposition 69 (1988)
- Revolutionary Youth Movement
- U.S. Labor Party

== People ==
=== Members ===
According to The Washington Post, LaRouche has told his followers that they are "golden souls", a term from The Republic of Plato. In his 1979 autobiography he contrasted the "golden souls" to "the poor donkeys, the poor sheep, whose consciousness is dominated by the infantile world-outlook of individual sensuous life". According to Dennis King, LaRouche believed that cadres "must be intellectually of a superior breed – a philosophical elite as well as a political vanguard". In 1986, LaRouche said during an interview, "What I represent is a growing movement. The movement is becoming stronger all the time..."

During the criminal trials of the late 1980s, LaRouche called upon his followers to be martyrs, saying that their "honorable deeds shall be legendary in the tales told to future generations". Senior members refused plea agreements that involved guilty pleas as those would have been black marks on the movement.

Former members report that life within the LaRouche movement is highly regulated. A former member of the security staff wrote in 1979 that members could be expelled for masturbating or using marijuana. Members who failed to achieve their fundraising quotas or otherwise showed signs as disloyal behavior were subjected to "ego stripping" sessions. Members, even spouses, were encouraged to inform on each other, according to an ex-member. Although LaRouche was officially opposed to abortion, a former member testified that women were encouraged to have abortions because "you can't have children during a revolution." Another source said some group leaders coerced members into having abortions. John Judis, writing in The New Republic, stated that LaRouche followers worked 16-hour days for little wages.

Former members have reported receiving harassing calls or indirect death threats. They say they have been called traitors. New Solidarity ran obituaries for three living former members. Internal memos have reportedly contained a variety of dismissive terms for ex-followers. One former member said that becoming a follower of LaRouche is "like entering the Bizarro World of the Superman comic books" which makes sense so long as one remains inside the movement.

E. Newbold Smith, who married a du Pont, was indicted along with four associates for planning to have his son, Lewis du Pont Smith, and daughter-in-law abducted and "deprogrammed" after they joined the LaRouche movement and donated $212,000 of Lewis's approximately $10 million inheritance to a LaRouche publishing arm. The incident resulted in serious legal repercussions but no criminal convictions for those indicted, including private investigator Galen Kelly. E. Newbold Smith also successfully had his son declared "incompetent" to manage his financial affairs in order to block him from possibly turning over his inheritance to the LaRouche organization.

Kenneth Kronberg, who had been a leading member of the movement, committed suicide in 2007, reportedly because of financial issues concerning the movement. His widow, Marielle (Molly) Kronberg, had also been a longtime member. She gave an interview to Chip Berlet in 2007 in which she made critical comments about the LaRouche movement. She was quoted as saying, "I'm worried that the organization may be in danger of becoming a killing machine." In 2004 and 2005, Kronberg made contributions of $1,501 to the Republican National Committee and the election campaign of George W. Bush, despite the LaRouche movement's opposition to the Bush administration. According to journalist Avi Klein, LaRouche felt that this "foreshadowed her treachery to the movement." Kronberg had been a member of the movement's governing National Committee since 1982 and was convicted of fraud during the LaRouche criminal trials.

=== Associates and managers ===
- Helga Zepp-LaRouche, widow, head of Schiller Institute and Bürgerrechtsbewegung Solidarität
- Amelia Boynton Robinson, SI vice chairwoman
- Michael Billington, fundraiser (convicted of mail fraud)
- William Wertz, chief fundraiser (convicted of mail fraud)
- Edward W. Spannaus, legal adviser (convicted of mail fraud)
- Dennis Small, fundraiser (convicted of mail fraud)
- Paul Greenberg, fundraiser (convicted of mail fraud)
- Joyce Rubinstein, fundraiser (convicted of mail fraud)
- Paul Gallagher
- Anita Gallagher, born Anita Gretz (1947– )
- Laurence Hecht
- Donald Phau
- Robert Primack (deceased)
- Ulf Sandmark, leader of European Workers Party, the Swedish section of the LaRouche Movement.
- Debra Freeman, national spokeswoman for the East Coast, chairwoman of the LaRouche campaign (1988)
- Kenneth Kronberg, editor and cofounder of Fidelio (deceased; suicide)

=== Political candidates ===
- Mel Logan, Democratic Party nominee for U.S. Senate in Wyoming in 2000
- Janice Hart, ran for Illinois Secretary of State in 1986, won Democratic Party nomination
- Mark J. Fairchild, ran for Illinois lieutenant governor in 1986, won Democratic Party nomination
- James Bevel, vice presidential running mate, 1992
- Craig Isherwood, head of Australian CEC
- Adrian Bennett, former Australian Labor Party federal MP, chairman and candidate of the Curtin Labor Alliance
- Jacques Cheminade, French politician
- Nancy Spannaus, ran for U.S. Senate in Virginia, 2002
- Eliott Greenspan, ran for Governor of New Jersey in 2001
- Ron Bettag, ran for mayor of Chicago, Illinois (announced his candidacy with press release datelined "Germany". Most local issue: "Washington, D.C. General Hospital now under KKK-Katie Graham siege")
- William Ferguson, ran for U.S. Congress in Massachusetts in 2001
- Kesha Rogers, Democratic candidate for Congress in 2010 and 2012 in 22nd Texas district
- Daniel Burke, candidate for US Senate in New Jersey in 2020
- Diane Sare, candidate for U.S. Senate in New York in 2022 and 2024.
- Solomon Peña, Republican nominee for New Mexico House of Representatives' 14th district in 2022 and suspect in attempted murder plot of several New Mexico politicians

=== Researchers, writers and spokespersons ===
- Jeffrey Steinberg, Director of Counterintelligence, EIR
- Allen Salisbury, author of The Civil War and the American System
- Anton Chaitkin, co-author of The Unauthorized Biography of George Bush
- Jonathan Tennenbaum
- Harley Schlanger, U.S. West Coast Spokesman
- Marsha Freeman, writer
- Richard Freeman, senior economics staff, EIR
- John Hoefle, banking columnist, EIR
- Marcia Merry-Baker
- Tony Papert
- Kathy Wolfe, economist, EIR (former member)

=== Former associates ===
- Nicholas F. Benton, aide to LaRouche, Washington, D.C. bureau chief, and White House Correspondent for Executive Intelligence Review
- Ortrum Cramer, a member of the management of the Schiller Institute
- Robert Dreyfuss, co-author of Hostage to Khomeini
- F. William Engdahl, author of A Century of War: Anglo-American Oil Politics and the New World Order
- Roy Frankhouser, security consultant (deceased)
- David P. Goldman, a.k.a. Spengler, co-author of The Ugly Truth About Milton Friedman and Dope, Inc.: Britain's Opium War against the U.S.
- Laurent Murawiec, former contributor and editor of Executive Information Review (deceased)
- Webster Tarpley, co-author of The Unauthorized Biography of George Bush, former president of the Schiller Institute in the U.S.
