= Janice Hart =

American politician (born 1955)

Janice Hart (born 1955) is an American former politician who was an unsuccessful candidate for the office of Illinois Secretary of State in 1986.

Hart, a political unknown and a LaRouche movement activist since the age of 17, unexpectedly won the Democratic Party's nomination. Her opponent, Aurelia Pucinski, came from a politically prominent family and was supported by the party organization. On March 19, 1986, Hart celebrated her surprise victory of the previous day, saying "I'm going to revive the spirit of Abraham Lincoln and General Patton. We're going to roll our tanks down State Street."

Prominent Democrats nationwide opposed Hart's candidacy, with Democratic National Committee chairman Paul Kirk saying "Good Lord, we have a problem here." Democratic gubernatorial candidate Adlai Stevenson III refused to run on the same slate with Hart and the LaRouche-supported candidate for Lieutenant Governor, Mark J. Fairchild. He described Hart, who is Jewish, and Fairchild as "neo-Nazis... who preach anti-Semitism, who cavort with the Ku Klux Klan, and who want to destroy labour unions." Instead, Stevenson formed the Solidarity Party and ran with Jane Spirgel as the Secretary of State nominee. Hart achieved 15% of the vote, with Spirgel taking 17%. Hart and Spirgel's opponent, Republican incumbent Jim Edgar, won the election by the largest margin in any statewide election in Illinois history, with 1.574 million votes (67%). Following the election Hart defiantly said, "Victory is not defined by your petty election."

Hart appeared in the news again in the summer of 1986 when she threw a pound of raw liver, as a symbolic "pound of flesh", at the feet of Milwaukee Archbishop Rembert Weakland, to protest what she perceived as his support for the International Monetary Fund. After initially failing to appear to answer the charges, she was fined $500 for disorderly conduct.

Hart opposed Pucinski again in 1988, this time for the Democratic nomination for Clerk of the Cook County Circuit Court, which Pucinski won. When Hart applied for the nomination for Secretary of State again in 1990 she did not qualify due to insufficient signatures on her petition. She subsequently retired from public life. In 2007, one-time ticketmate Fairchild told a reporter that Hart was no longer with the LaRouche movement.

== Political significance ==
Hart ran on the LaRouche platform, including measures to classify AIDS as a communicable disease "and give health officials the power to test and quarantine where needed," investigation of supposed drug smuggling cartels protected by Henry Kissinger and Katharine Graham, and strong support for the Strategic Defense Initiative and nuclear power. Ever since the 1986 election the Hart candidacy has been discussed and studied by academics, and journalists. Some blame Stevenson for his inept campaigning for the ticket and voters for their apathy. Dennis King in Lyndon LaRouche and the New American Fascism (1989) cites evidence that some of Hart's support resulted from below-the-radar organizing and campaigning in farm communities and rust belt towns.

== Footnotes ==
Party political offices
Preceded by Jerome Cosentino	Democratic nominee for Secretary of State of Illinois; 1986	Succeeded by Jerome Cosentino
