= Helga Zepp-LaRouche =

German political activist (born 1948)

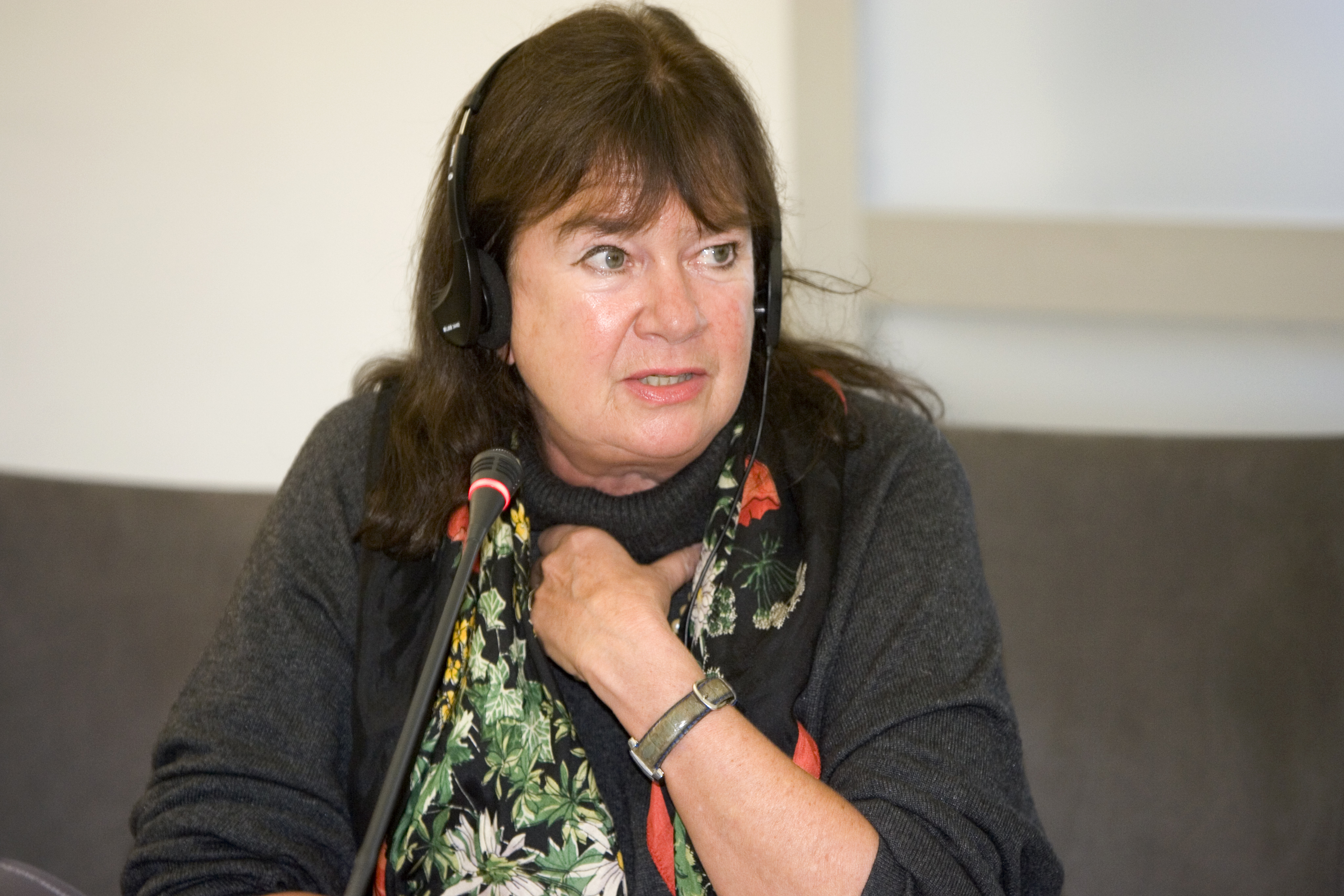
- Zepp-LaRouche in 2005
- Born: Helga Zepp; 25 August 1948 (age 78); Trier, French Occupation Zone, Germany
- Occupation: Activist
- Organization: Schiller Institute
- Political party: BüSo
- Spouse: Lyndon LaRouche (m. 1977; died 2019)

Helga Zepp-LaRouche (born 25 August 1948) is a German political activist. She is the widow of American political activist Lyndon LaRouche, and the founder of the LaRouche movement's Schiller Institute, as well as the German Bürgerrechtsbewegung Solidarität party (BüSo) (Civil Rights Movement Solidarity).

She has run for political office several times in Germany, representing small parties founded by the LaRouche movement, but has never been elected. She is the editor of Das Hitler-Buch (1984), published by the Schiller Institute, a collection of historical investigations into the origins of Nazism. According to Ukrainian critics, Zepp-LaRouche often resorts to distorting facts from history.

== Biography ==
Lyndon LaRouche wrote in The Power of Reason (first edition) that his wife was an orphan. According to the Schiller Institute and Bürgerrechtsbewegung Solidarität websites, she left high school in 1968 to work as an unpaid journalist in Hamburg and Hannover, later becoming a freelancer. In 1971, the websites continue, she traveled through China as one of the first European journalists there, just after the highpoint of the Cultural Revolution. When she returned to Germany, she studied political science, history and philosophy at the Otto Suhr Institute of the Free University of Berlin and at Frankfurt am Main.

On 29 December 1977, Helga Zepp and Lyndon LaRouche were married in Wiesbaden. According to her official biography on the Schiller Institute website, she traveled with her husband to promote his proposals for monetary reform and large-scale infrastructural development, and met with former Indian prime minister Indira Gandhi and former Mexican president José López Portillo. She returned to Mexico in 1998, and participated as mistress of ceremonies at a conference held at the Academy of Economics of the Mexican Society of Geography, during which Lopez Portillo greeted her once again, according to the LaRouche movement's Executive Intelligence Review. Earlier that year, Lopez Portillo, along with former Ugandan President Godfrey Binaisa, former Algerian Prime Minister Abdelhamid Brahimi and other politicians, had added his signature to a call issued by Zepp-LaRouche for a "new just world economic order."

== Activism ==
Zepp-LaRouche is the editor of Das Hitler-Buch, an analysis of the ideological origins and international financial backing of National Socialism, published by the Schiller Institute, Campaigner Publications Deutschland, Wiesbaden 1984. ISBN 3-922734-05-7 (translated as The Hitler Book, 1984. ISBN 0-933488-37-8) She founded the Schiller Institute in the same year, saying: "We need a movement that can finally free Germany from the control of the Versailles and Yalta treaties, thanks to which we have staggered from one catastrophe to another for an entire century."

In Dancing on My Grave (1986), ballerina Gelsey Kirkland describes her encounter with Zepp-LaRouche's ideas, as the former was battling her drug addiction: "In spite of her extreme point of view, her unyielding radicalism, this woman provided a crucial turning point for me. Her zealous devotion to the classics and her political war against drugs emboldened me to act, yet in my own way."

She is an opponent of the clash of civilizations doctrine of Samuel P. Huntington. Following the September 11 attacks, she campaigned against the idea that there is a fundamental antagonism between U.S. and Europe on the one side, and Islam or Asian culture on the other. She has called for a "Dialogue of Cultures" as opposed to a "Clash of Civilizations."

In June 2001, Zepp-LaRouche spoke before the Russian State Duma hearings on Measures to Ensure the Development of Russia's Economy under Conditions of Global Financial Destabilization. Her theme was the assertion that Wilhelm Lautenbach's program for productive employment, had it been adopted in 1931, could have ended the depression and prevented the Nazis' rise to power, and that the adoption of her husband's Eurasian Land-Bridge proposal today can avert a similar disaster. Zepp-LaRouche's presentation was later published in 2007 in the Russian magazine Forum International, in an issue devoted to the “Megaprojects of Russia’s East” conference on the Bering Strait crossing.

Zepp-LaRouche has launched campaigns in various countries on other issues, including opposition to globalization and support for her husband's "New Bretton Woods" proposal, and a proposal to dissolve the World Trade Organization and double world food production. This latter proposal was described by the Egyptian daily Al-Ahram as "among the notable visions, worthy of respect, which are consistent with the vision put forward by President Mubarak in Davos."

In 2012, she was a featured speaker at the 10th annual “Dialogue of Civilizations” conference in Rhodes, sponsored by the World Public Forum. She said that the accelerating collapse of the transatlantic system is driving the danger of a new world war, and that US and European liquidity expansion measures have led to a hyper-inflationary printing of money, with its “life-shortening effect” upon millions of people in Greece, Italy, Spain and Portugal.

In August 2015, Zepp-LaRouche wrote an article describing climate change as a "Satanic swindle". In her opinion, it "supplies the argumentation to establish a global eco-dictatorship whose results, and whose declared intention is to eliminate six billion human beings". Zepp-LaRouche argued that preparations are under-way for the establishment of "a fascist world government which would exceed Hitler’s most audacious dreams". Zepp-LaRouche suggested the origin of the "swindle" is the British monarchy.

In July 2016, Zepp-LaRouche spoke at the first panel on the Think 20 Summit, which was organised by three Chinese academies and institutes: the Institute of World Economics and Politics at the Chinese Academy of Social Sciences, the Shanghai Institute for International Studies, and the Chongyang Institute for Financial Studies at the Renmin University of China.

On 24 February 2021, Zepp-LaRouche denounced the LaRouche Political Action Committee (LPAC) and its treasurer, Barbara Boyd, for going "in a direction which I consider contrary to the central policies that my husband stood for. [...] [S]ince he passed away in February 2019, Mrs. Boyd and her associates [...] have embarked on a path that I believe misrepresents both my and Mr. LaRouche’s positions." and stated that LPAC and Boyd do not represent the LaRouche movement.

On 7 October 2026, Zepp-LaRouche presented at a meeting in Frankfurt, organized by the Chinese government, coinciding with the publication of the German translation of volume five of Xi Jinping's The Governance of China, alongside numerous German academics and political officials. Zepp-LaRouche recommended all sectors of society study Xi Jinping's writings to understand the philosophical and conceptual foundations of China's economic development.
