= Stefan Zucker =

American editor, radio host and opera singer

Stefan Zucker (born 1949) is an American singer, expert on Italian opera and self-described "opera fanatic." He was listed in the 1980 Guinness Book of Records as the "world's highest tenor" for having hit and sustained an A above high C for 3.8 seconds at The Town Hall in New York City on September 12, 1972.

== Life and career ==
Zucker earned a Bachelor of Science in philosophy from Columbia University and studied for a Ph.D. in that subject at New York University.

Zucker was the editor of Opera Fanatic magazine and hosted the radio interview program of the same name on WKCR-FM radio in New York City from the 1970s to 1995. The program was broadcast weekly on Saturday evenings. Zucker and his audience (who participated by means of comments called in during musical segments) were highly focused on great singers and singing technique. Several opera singers considered to be greats of their age joined Zucker in the studio for long interviews that featured in depth discussion of the physical technique of voice production, musical and dramatic interpretation, and great singers of the past. Visitors included Magda Olivero, Franco Corelli, Jerome Hines, Alfredo Kraus, Francisco Araiza. Ferruccio Tagliavini, Grace Bumbry and Carlo Bergonzi. The radio show featured regular "Name the Voice" challenges to listeners, in which listeners were asked to identify voices from historic recordings. In another regular feature, listeners voted for their favorite tenor of the century.

The eccentric enthusiasm of Zucker and his audience for opera was reflected in the magazine Opera Fanatic, which once featured a nude centerfold and speculated that singer Aprile Millo might be the daughter of President Kennedy. Zucker also waded into a controversial plan by Lyndon LaRouche to legislate a standard pitch for middle C lower than that currently used, which according to supporters would return standard pitch to 19th-century levels, aiding singers. Zucker opposed the change. In Jan Schmidt-Garre's 1998 documentary film "Opera Fanatic", Zucker travels around Italy interviewing opera divas from the 1950s. Zucker contributed to the International Dictionary of Opera, Opera News, American Record Guide, Opera Quarterly, Professione Musica, The Globe and Mail and others.

After Columbia University, the owner of WKCR-FM radio, dropped Zucker as the host of "Opera Fanatic" in 1994, he turned his efforts to preserving early opera recordings and films through his nonprofit Bel Canto Society. He talks and sings in Jan Schmidt-Garre's film series "The Tenors of the 78 Era" and has lectured at the Mannes College of Music in New York City. Four of Zucker's articles from Opera News written from 1981 to 1986, about singing and singers, are collected as The Origins of Modern Tenor Singing, a 16-page booklet. The articles focus on Gioachino Rossini, castratos and florid singing; the David family of tenors; Andrea Nozzari; Giovanni Battista Rubini; Gilbert Duprez; and the high C "from the chest." These articles trace the development, as understood by Zucker, of tenor singing from the 1770s through the mid-19th century to Enrico Caruso.

Zucker and his mother, soprano Rosina Wolf, claim to be the last in a line of singers using the method of singing style taught by Giovanni Battista Rubini. Many people have criticized Zucker's singing, which has a pronounced "bleat" sound. The critic Donal Henahan wrote in The New York Times, reviewing Zucker in a performance of Bellini's opera Adelson e Salvini, that his high notes were like "the scratching of a fingernail on a blackboard." Zucker and his mother produced the first performance of the 1829 final version of that opera.
