= Andrzej Grzegorczyk =

Polish mathematician and philosopher (1922–2014)

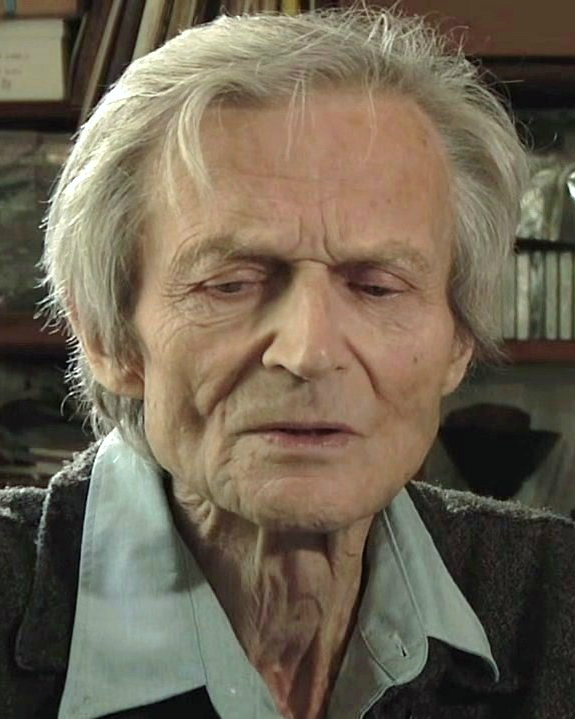
- Grzegorczyk in 2012
- Born: 22 August 1922; Warsaw, Poland
- Died: 20 March 2014 (aged 91); Warsaw, Poland
- Resting place: Cemetery in Pruszków, Poland; 52°10′N 20°48′E
- Citizenship: Poland
- Education: Jagiellonian University; University of Warsaw
- Known for: Grzegorczyk hierarchy Grzegorczyk logic (S4Grz)
- Spouse: Renata Maria Grzegorczykowa (m. 1953)
- Children: Agnieszka Grzegorczyk-Przeciszewska; Tomasz Grzegorczyk
- Awards: Stefan Banach Prize (1957); Knight's Cross of Order of Polonia Restituta (1997) dr. h.c. of Blaise Pascal University (2010) dr. h.c. of Jagiellonian University (2013); Officer's Cross of Order of Polonia Restituta (2014)
- Scientific career
- Fields: Logic; Ethics; Mathematics philosophy Religious study Social issues Education
- Workplaces: University of Warsaw; Polish Academy of Sciences; University of Amsterdam
- Thesis: On Topological Spaces in Topologies without Points (1950)
- Doctoral advisor: Andrzej Mostowski
- Other academic advisors: Zygmunt Zawirski; Władysław Tatarkiewicz
- Doctoral students: Stanisław Krajewski

Signature
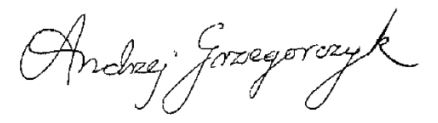

Notes
- Family members include: Stanisław Jan Majewski; Erazm Majewski; Karol Borsuk; Magdalena Borsuk-Białynicka; Andrzej Białynicki-Birula; Iwo Białynicki-Birula; Marcin Przeciszewski

Andrzej Grzegorczyk ([ˈandʐɛj ɡʐɛˈɡɔrt͡ʂɨk]; 22 August 1922 – 20 March 2014) was a Polish logician, mathematician, philosopher and ethicist. He was noted for his work in computability, mathematical logic and the foundations of mathematics.

== Family ==
In 1953, Grzegorczyk married Renata Maria Grzegorczykowa, a Polish philologist and expert in polonist linguistics. They had a daughter and a son.

Grzegorczyk died of natural causes in Warsaw on 20 March 2014 at the age of 91. His body is buried in the Cemetery of Pruszków.

== See also ==
- List of Polish people

== Sources ==
- Odintsov, Sergei Pavlovich (2018): Larisa Maksimova on Implication, Interpolation, and Definability. Springer International Publishing, Cham
- Golińska-Pilarek, Joanna; Huuskonen, Taneli (2017): Grzegorczyk's non-Fregean logics and their formal properties. In Urbaniak, Rafał; Payette, Gillman (editors) (2017): Applications of Formal Philosophy: The Road Less Travelled. Springer International Publishing, Cham, Chapter 12, pp. 243–263
- Brożek, Anna; Stadler, Friedrich; Woleński, Jan (editors) (2017): The Significance of the Lvov–Warsaw School in the European Culture. Springer International Publishing, Cham
- Majewska, Lucyna (2017): Этическое творчество Анджея Гжегорчика (Andrzej Grzegorczyk's works in ethics) . ВЕЧЕ: Журнал русской философии и культуры, Volume 29, pp. 285–295 (Publishing House of Saint Petersburg State University, Saint Petersburg)
- Śliwerski, Bogusław (2016): O kluczowej dla pedagogiki twórczości filozofa Andrzeja Grzegorczyka. Blog Pedagog, 4 January 2016
- Niwiński, Damian (2016): Contribution of Warsaw Logicians to Computational Logic. Axioms, Volume 5, Issue 16, 8 pages
- Golińska-Pilarek, Joanna (2016): On the Minimal Non-Fregean Grzegorczyk Logic: To the Memory of Andrzej Grzegorczyk. Studia Logica: An International Journal for Symbolic Logic, Volume 104, Issue 2, pp. 209–234
- Hirnyy, Oleg (June 2016). "Andrzej Grzegorczyk as a Philosopher of Education". Filosofiya Osvity / Philosophy of Education. 18 (1). Institute of Higher Education NAES of Ukraine: 242–256. doi:10.31874/2309-1606-2016-18-1-242-256.
- Visser, Albert (2016): The Second Incompleteness Theorem: Reflections and Rumination. In Horsten, Leon; Welch, Philip (editors) (2016): Gödel's Disjunction: The Scope and Limits of Mathematical Knowledge. Oxford University Press, Oxford, pp. 67–91
- Huuskonen, Taneli (2015): Grzegorczyk's Logics: Part I . Formalized Mathematics, Volume 23, Issue 3, pp. 177–187
- Huuskonen, Taneli (2015): Polish Notation . Formalized Mathematics, Volume 23, Issue 3, pp. 161–176
- Biłat, Andrzej (2015): Non-Fregean Logics of Analytic Equivalence (II). Bulletin of the Section of Logic, Volume 44, Issue 1–2, pp. 69–79
- Kładoczny, Piotr (2015): The Release and Rehabilitation of Victims of Stalinist Terror in Poland. In McDermott, Kevin; Stibbe, Matthew (editors) (2015): De-Stalinising Eastern Europe: The Rehabilitation of Stalin's Victims after 1953. Palgrave Macmillan, Basingstoke, pp. 67–86
- Góralski, Andrzej (editor) (2015): Andrzej Grzegorczyk – Człowiek i dzieło. Biblioteka Dialogu. Universitas Rediviva, Warsaw
- Woleński, Jan; Marek, Victor Witold (2015): Logic in Poland after 1945 (until 1975). European Review, Volume 23, pp. 159–197
- Jankowska, Małgorzata (2015): Życie to wyzwanie: Pamięci Profesora Andrzeja Grzegorczyka. Kwartalnik Filozoficzny, Volume 43, Issue 1, pp. 5–13
- Pelc, Jerzy (2015): Od wydawcy: Pożegnanie ze "Studiami Semiotycznymi". Studia Semiotyczne, Volume 28–29, pp. 5–30
- Krajewski, Stanisław (2015): Andrzej Grzegorczyk (1922–2014) . Studia Semiotyczne, Volume 28–29, pp. 63–88
- Krajewski, Stanisław (2014): Andrzej Grzegorczyk (1922–2014). Wiadomości Matematyczne, Volume 50, Issue 1, pp. 171–173
- Jankowska, Małgorzata (2014): Filozoficzne dekalogi – tekst dedykowany pamięci profesora Andrzeja Grzegorczyka (1922–2014). Zeszyty Naukowe Centrum Badań im. Edyty Stein, Number 12: Wobec Samotności, Wydawnictwo Naukowe UAM, Poznań, pp. 251–265
- Trela, Grzegorz (2014): Logika – sprawa ludzka: Wspomnienie o profesorze Andrzeju Grzegorczyku (1922–2014). Argument, Volume 4, Number 2, pp. 491–498
- Maksimova, Larisa Lvovna (2014): The Lyndon property and uniform interpolation over the Grzegorczyk logic. Siberian Mathematical Journal, Volume 55, Number 1, pp. 118–124 (translated from the Russian version)
- Avigad, Jeremy; Brattka, Vasco (2014): Computability and Analysis: The Legacy of Alan Turing. In Downey, Rod (editor) (2014): Turing's Legacy: Developments from Turing's Ideas in Logic. Cambridge University Press, Cambridge, pp. 1–47
- Duchliński, Piotr (2014): W stronę aporetycznej filozofii klasycznej: Konfrontacja tomizmu egzystencjalnego z wybranymi koncepcjami filozofii współczesnej. Akademia Ignatianum, Wydawnictwo WAM, Kraków
- Murawski, Roman (2014): The Philosophy of Mathematics and Logic in the 1920s and 1930s in Poland. Birkhäuser, Basel
- Urbaniak, Rafał (2014): Leśniewski's Systems of Logic and Foundations of Mathematics. Springer International Publishing, Cham
- Kamiński, Łukasz; Waligóra, Grzegorz (editors) (2014): Kryptonim "Pegaz". Służba Bezpieczeństwa wobec Towarzystwa Kursów Naukowych 1978–1980 . Instytut Pamięci Narodowej – Komisja Ścigania Zbrodni przeciwko Narodowi Polskiemu, Warsaw
- Kamiński, Łukasz; Waligóra, Grzegorz (editors) (2014): Kryptonim Wasale: Służba bezpieczeństwa wobec studenckich komitetów Solidarności 1977–1980 . Instytut Pamięci Narodowej – Komisja Ścigania Zbrodni przeciwko Narodowi Polskiemu, Warsaw
- Feferman, Solomon (2013): About and around Computing over the Reals. In Copeland, Brian Jack; Posy, Carl; Shagrir, Oron (editors) (2013): Computability: Turing, Gödel, Church, and Beyond. MIT Press, Cambridge, Massachusetts, pp. 55–76
- Mints, Grigori; Olkhovikov, Grigory; Urquhart, Alasdair (2013): Failure of Interpolation in Constant Domain Intuitionistic Logic. Journal of Symbolic Logic, Volume 78, Issue 3, pp. 937–950
- Trzęsicki, Kazimierz; Krajewski, Stanisław; Woleński, Jan (editors) (2012): Papers on Logic and Rationality: Festschrift in Honour of Andrzej Grzegorczyk. Studies in Logic, Grammar and Rhetoric, Volume 27, Issue 40. University of Białystok, Białystok
- Mikołajczuk, Agnieszka (2012): O życiu zawodowym i dokonaniach naukowych Profesor Renaty Grzegorczykowej. Etnolingwistyka, Volume 24, pp. 7–10
- Tavana, Nazanin Roshandel; Weihrauch, Klaus (2011): Turing machines on represented sets, a model of computation for analysis. Logical Methods in Computer Science, Volume 7, Issue 2, pp. 1–21
- Resnick, Rebecca Abigail (2011): Finding the best model for continuous computation . Senior Thesis, Harvard University, Cambridge
- Woleński, Jan (2011): Jews in Polish Philosophy. Shofar: An Interdisciplinary Journal of Jewish Studies, Volume 29, Number 3, pp. 68–82
- Murawski, Roman (2011): Logos and Mathema: Studies in the Philosophy of Mathematics and History of Logic. Peter Lang, Frankfurt am Main
- Murawski, Roman (2010): Essays in the Philosophy and History of Logic and Mathematics. Rodopi, Amsterdam
- Čačić, Vedran; Pudlák, Pavel; Restall, Greg; Urquhart, Alasdair; Visser, Albert (2010): Decorated linear order types and the theory of concatenation. In Delon, Françoise; Kohlenbach, Ulrich; Maddy, Penelope; Stephan, Frank (editors) (2010): Logic Colloquium 2007. Lecture Notes in Logic, Volume 35. Association for Symbolic Logic, Cambridge University Press, Cambridge, pp. 1–13
- Grzegorczyk, Franciszek (2010): Doktor Marian Borsuk — ordynator Oddziału Chirurgicznego Szpitala Wolskiego (1907–1923) (Marian Borsuk MD — head of Surgical Department, Wolski Hospital (1907–1923)). Pneumonologia i Alergologia Polska, Volume 78, Issue 4, pp. 306–309
- Maksimova, Larisa Lvovna (2009): Restricted interpolation property in superintuitionistic logics. Algebra i Logika, Volume 48, Number 1, pp. 54–89
- Švejdar, Vítězslav (2009): On Interpretability in the Theory of Concatenation. Notre Dame Journal of Formal Logic, Volume 50, Number 1, pp. 87–95
- Barra, Matthias (2009): Notes on small inductively defined classes and the majorisation relation. Dissertation presented for the degree of Philosophiae Doctor (PhD), Department of Mathematics, University of Oslo, November 2009, supervised by Lars Kristiansen
- Ehrenfeucht, Andrzej; Marek, Victor Witold; Srebrny, Marian (editors) (2008): Andrzej Mostowski and Foundational Studies. IOS Press, Amsterdam
- Krajewski, Stanisław; Marek, Victor Witold; Mirkowska, Grażyna; Salwicki, Andrzej; Woleński, Jan (editors) (2008): Topics in Logic, Philosophy and Foundations of Mathematics and Computer Science: In Recognition of Professor Andrzej Grzegorczyk. Fundamenta Informaticae, Volume 81, Issue 1–3. IOS Press, Amsterdam
- Krajewski, Stanisław (2008): Andrzej Grzegorczyk – logika i religia, samotność i solidarność. Wiadomości Matematyczne, Volume 44, Number 01, pp. 53–59
- Matuszewski, Roman; Zalewska, Anna (editors) (2007): From Insight to Proof: Festschrift in Honour of Andrzej Trybulec. Studies of Logic, Grammar, and Rhetoric, Volume 10, Issue 23
- Švejdar, Vítězslav (2007): An interpretation of Robinson's Arithmetic in its Grzegorczyk's weaker variant. Fundamenta Informaticae, Volume 81, Issue 1–3, pp. 347–354
- Maksimova, Larisa Lvovna (2006): Projective Beth Property in Extensions of Grzegorczyk Logic. Studia Logica: An International Journal for Symbolic Logic, Volume 83, pp. 365–391
- Eisler, Jerzy Krzysztof (2006): Polski rok 1968 . Instytut Pamięci Narodowej – Komisja Ścigania Zbrodni przeciwko Narodowi Polskiemu, Warszawa
- Jadacki, Jacek Juliusz (2006): The Lvov–Warsaw School and Its Influence on Polish Philosophy of the Second Half of the 20th Century. In Jadacki, Jacek Juliusz and Paśniczek, Jacek (editors): The Lvov–Warsaw School – The New Generation. Rodopi, Amsterdam, pp. 41–83
- Trzęsicki, Kazimierz (2006): Wkład logików polskich w światową informatykę. Filozofia Nauki – kwartalnik, Volume 14, Issue 3, pp. 5–19
- Zieliński, Wojciech (2006): W poszukiwaniu filozofii znaczącej (uwagi na marginesie dyskusji). Diametros, Issue 10, pp. 78–92
- Kostrzycka, Zofia (2006): Density of truth in modal logics. Discrete Mathematics and Theoretical Computer Science Proceedings Volume AG Fourth Colloquium on Mathematics and Computer Science: Algorithms, Trees, Combinatorics and Probabilities, Nancy, France pp. 161–170
- Hainry, Emmanuel (2006): Modèles de calcul sur les réels, résultats de comparaison. Doctoral thesis, Institut National Polytechnique de Lorraine, Laboratoire Lorrain de Recherche en Informatique et ses Applications – UMR 7503, supervised by Olivier Bournez
- Bournez, Olivier; Hainry, Emmanuel (2005): Elementarily computable functions over the real numbers and $\mathbb{R}$-sub-recursive functions. Theoretical Computer Science, Volume 348, Issues 2–3, pp. 130–147
- Gawor, Leszek; Zdybel, Lech (2005): Elements of Twentieth Century Polish Ethics. In Jedynak, Stanisław (editor) (2005): Polish Axiology: The 20th Century and Beyond. Polish Philosophical Studies V. The Council for Research in Values and philosophy, Washington, D.C., Chapter II, pp. 37–61
- ERCOM: Stefan Banach International Mathematical Center. Newsletter of European Mathematical Society, Issue 58, December 2005, pp. 37–38
- Gabbay, Dov; Maksimova, Larisa Lvovna (2005): Interpolation and Definability: Modal and Intuitionistic Logic. Oxford University Press, Oxford
- Maksimova, Larisa Lvovna (2004): Definability in Normal Extensions of S4. Algebra i Logika, Volume 43, Number 4, pp. 387–410
- Wybraniec-Skardowska, Urszula (2004): Foundations for the formalization of metamathematics and axiomatizations of consequence theories. Annals of Pure and Applied Logic, Volume 127, pp 243–266
- Jeřábek, Emil (2004): A note on Grzegorczyk's logic. Mathematical Logic Quarterly, Volume 50, Number 3, pp. 295–296
- Szałas, Andrzej Piotr (2004): Logic for Computer Science. Lecture Notes. October 2004
- Hasuo, Ichiro; Kashima, Ryo (2003): Kripke Completeness of First-Order Constructive Logics with Strong Negation. Logic Journal of the IGPL, Volume 11, Issue 6, pp. 615–646
- Wójcicki, Ryszard; Zygmunt, Jan (2003): Polish Logic in Postwar Period. In Hendricks, Vincent Fella; Malinowski, Jacek (editors) (2003): Trends in Logic: 50 Years of Studia Logica. Kluwer Academic Publishers, Dordrecht, pp. 11–33
- Mackiewicz, Witold (2003): Ludzie i Idee: Polska filozofia najnowsza. Zarys problematyki. Agencja Wydawniczo-Poligraficzna "Witmark", Warsaw
- Jaworowski, Zbigniew (2003): Eurocentrism. Res Humana, Number 1, Issue 62, pp. 11–15. Republished in The Polish Foreign Affairs Digest: Quarterly, Volume 3, Number 2, Issue 7, pp. 29–37
- Słowik, Zdzisław (2002): O duchu Europy i jej powołaniu: Rozmowa z profesorem Andrzejem Grzegorczykiem. Res Humana, Number 4, Issue 59, pp. 24–28
- Chmurzyński, Jerzy Andrzej (2002): Searching Europe's Destination. Dialogue and Universalism, Number 6-7, pp. 133–144
- Ciesielski, Remigiusz Tadeusz (2002): Sens Europy. Kultura Współczesna: Teorie, Interpretacje, Praktyka, Issue 3–4, pp. 111–117
- Fiorentini, Camillo; Miglioli, Pierangelo (1999): A Cut-free Sequent Calculus for the Logic of Constant Domains with a Limited Amount of Duplications. Logic Journal of the IGPL, Volume 7, Issue 6, pp. 733–753
- Wiśniewski, Ryszard; Tyburski, Włodzimierz (editors) (1999): Polska filozofia analityczna: W kręgu szkoły lwowsko-warszawskiej. Wydawnictwo Naukowe Uniwersytetu Mikołaja Kopernika, Toruń
- Murawski, Roman (1999): Recursive Functions and Metamathematics: Problems of Completeness and Decidability, Gödel's theorems. Kluwer Academic Publishers, Dordrecht
- Woleński, Jan; Köhler, Eckehart (editors) (1999): Alfred Tarski and the Vienna Circle: Austro–Polish Connections in Logical Empiricism. Kluwer Academic Publishers, Dordrecht
- Kijania-Placek, Katarzyna; Woleński, Jan (editors) (1998):The Lvov–Warsaw School and Contemporary philosophy. Kluwer Academic Publishers, Dordrecht
- Srzednicki, Jan Tadeusz Jerzy; Stachniak, Zbigniew (editors) (1998): Leśniewski's Systems Protothetic. Kluwer Academic Publishers, Dordrecht
- Weihrauch, Klaus (1997): A Foundation for Computable Analysis. In Freksa, Christian; Jantzen, Matthias; Valk, Rüdiger (editors) (1997): Foundations of Computer Science: Potential-Theory-Cognition. Springer, Heidelberg, pp. 185–199
- Kaczor, Anna (1997): Perspektywy edukacji. Przegląd Humanistyczny, Volume 41, Number 3, Issue 342, pp. 188–193
- Jadacki, Jacek Juliusz (1996): The Conceptual System of the Lvov–Warsaw School. Axiomathes, Number 3, pp. 325–333
- Błaszczyk, Jolanta (1994): Dziewięć Lat Warszawskiej Premiery Literackiej (Nine years of the Warsaw Literary Award). Bibliotekarz, Issue 3, pp. 25–27
- Mardaev, Sergei Il'ich (1993): Least fixed points in Grzegorczyk's logic and in the intuitionistic propositional logic. Algebra and Logic, Volume 32, Issue 5, pp. 279–288
- Boolos, George (1993): The Logic of Provability. Cambridge University Press, Cambridge
- Woleński, Jan (editor) (1990): Philosophical Logic in Poland. Kluwer Academic Publishers, Dordrecht
- Woleński, Jan (editor) (1990): Kotarbiński: Logic, Semantics and Ontology. Kluwer Academic Publishers, Dordrecht
- Woleński, Jan (1989): Logic and Philosophy in the Lvov–Warsaw School. Kluwer Academic Publishers, Dordrecht
- Maryniarczyk, Andrzej (1989): Filozofia naukowa czy kolejny zabobon?. Ethos: Kwartalnik Instytutu Jana Pawła II KUL, Volume 2, Number 8, pp. 332–337
- Srzednicki, Jan Tadeusz Jerzy; Rickey, Vincent Frederick; Czelakowski, Janusz (editors) (1984): Leśniewski's Systems: Ontology and Mereology. Martinus Nijhoff Publishers, The Hague & Ossolineum: Publishing House of the Polish Academy of Sciences, Wrocław
- Gabbay, Dov; Guenthner, Franz (editors) (1984): Handbook of Philosophical Logic, Volume II: Extensions of Classical Logic. D. Reidel, Dordrecht
- Paris, Jeffrey Bruce; Wilkie, Alex James (1984): $\Delta_0$ sets and induction. In Guzicki, Wojciech; Marek, Wiktor Witold; Pelc, Andrzej; Rauszer, Cecylia (editors) (1984): Open Days in Model Theory and Set Theory: Proceedings of a Conference held in September 1981 at Jadwisin, near Warsaw, Poland. University of Leeds, Leeds, pp. 237–248
- Cichoń, Eugeniusz Adam; Wainer, Stanley Scott (1983): The Slow-Growing and the Grzegorczyk Hierarchies. Journal of Symbolic Logic, Volume 48, Issue 2, pp. 399–408
- Boolos, George (1980): Provability in arithmetic and a schema of Grzegorczyk. Fundamenta Mathematicae, Volume 60, Number 1, pp. 41–45
- Boolos, George (1979): The Unprovability of Consistency: An Essay in Modal Logic. Cambridge University Press, Cambridge
- Hass, Ludwik (1979): Wolnomularze i loże wolnomularskie Płocka (1803–1821). Rocznik Mazowiecki, Volume 7, pp. 69–126
- Tatarkiewicz, Teresa; Tatarkiewicz, Władysław (1979): Wspomnienia. Państwowy Instytut Wydawniczy, Warsaw
- Mostowski, Andrzej (1979): Thirty Years of Foundational Studies: Lectures on the Development of Mathematical Logic and the Study of the Foundations of Mathematics in 1930–1964. In Kuratowski, Kazimierz; Marek, Wiktor Witold; Pacholski, Leszek; Rasiowa, Helena; Ryll-Nardzewski, Czesław; Zbierski, Paweł (editors): Andrzej Mostowski: Foundational Studies, Selected Works, Volume I. North-Holland, Amsterdam & PWN–Polish Scientific Publishers, Warsaw, pp. 1–176
- Chomsky, Noam (1977): The Right to Help: Noam Chomsky and Andrzej Grzegorczyk. The New York Review of Books, 4 August 1977.
- Ptaczek, Józef (editor) (1976): Memoriał 59, inne dokumenty protestu oraz list otwarty prof. dr Edwarda Lipińskiego do Gierka. Wydawnictwo Komitetu Głównego P.P.S. w Niemczech, Munich
- Wainer, Stanley Scott (1972): Ordinal Recursion, and a Refinement of the Extended Grzegorczyk Hierarchy. Journal of Symbolic Logic, Volume 37, Issue 2, pp. 281–292
- Segerberg, Karl Krister (1971): An Essay in Classical Modal Logic . PhD dissertation under Dana Stewart Scott, Stanford University. Filosofiska Studier utgivna av Filosofiska Föreningen och Filosofiska Institutionen vid Uppsala Universitet, Number 13, Uppsala, 1971
- Klemke, Dieter (1971): Ein Henkin-Beweis für die Vollständigkeit eines Kalküls relativ zur Grzegorczyk-Semantik. Archiv für Mathematische Logik und Grundlagenforschung, Volume 14, pp. 148–161
- Görnemann, Sabine (1971): A logic stronger than intuitionism. Journal of Symbolic Logic, Volume 36, Issue 2, pp. 249–261
- Klemke, Dieter (1970): Ein vollständiger Kalkül für die Folgerungsbeziehung der Grzegorczyk-Semantik. Dissertation, Albert-Ludwigs-Universität Freiburg im Breisgau, Naturwissenschaftlich-Mathematische Fakultät
- Görnemann, Sabine (1969): Über eine Verschärfung der intuitionistischen Logik. Proefschrift, Technische Hochschule Hannover, Fakultät für Mathematik und Naturwissenschaft
- Gabbay, Dov (1969): Montague Type Semantics for Non-Classical Logics I. U.S. Air Force Office of Scientific Research, contract No. F 61052-68-C-0036, Report No. 4
- Kostanecki, Stanisław (1969): Mirosław Zdziarski (1892–1939). Rocznik Mazowiecki, Volume 2, pp. 309–339
- Starnawski, Jerzy (1969): Piotr Grzegorczyk (17 listopada 1894 – 20 maja 1968). Pamiętnik Literacki: Czasopismo kwartalne poświęcone historii i krytyce literatury polskiej, Volume 60, Issue 2, pp. 409–415
- Addison, John West; Henkin, Leon; Tarski, Alfred (editors) (1965): The Theory of Models: Proceedings of the 1963 International Symposium at Berkeley. North-Holland, Amsterdam
- Jordan, Zbigniew Antoni (1963): Philosophy and Ideology: The Development of Philosophy and Marxism-Leninism in Poland since the Second World War. D. Reidel, Dordrecht
- Luschei, Eugene Charles (1962): The Logical Systems of Lesniewski. North-Holland, Amsterdam
- Czeżowski, Tadeusz (editor) (1960): Charisteria: Rozprawy filozoficzne złożone w darze Władysławowi Tatarkiewiczowi w siedemdziesiątą rocznicę urodzin. Państwowe Wydawnictwo Naukowe, Warsaw
- Załęski, Stanisław (1908): O masonii w Polsce od roku 1738 do 1822: na źródłach wyłącznie masońskich. Druk W.L. Anczyca i Spółki, Kraków
- Wójcicki, Kazimierz Władysław (1858): Cmentarz Powązkowski oraz cmentarze katolickie i innych wyznań pod Warszawą i w okolicach tegoż miasta, Tom III. Drukarnia S. Orgelbranda, Warsaw
