= Krajewski =

Krajewski (Polish pronunciation: [kraˈɨɛvski]; feminine: Krajewska; plural: Krajewscy) is a Polish-language surname. It is derived from place names such as Krajewo and the noun "kraj". It appears in various forms in other languages.

Language	Masculine	Feminine
Polish	Krajewski	Krajewska
Belarusian (Romanization)	Краеўскі (Krajeŭski, Krayeuski, Kraieuski)	Краеўская (Krajeŭskaja, Krayeuskaya, Kraieuskaia)
Russian (Romanization)	Краевский (Krayevsky, Krayevskiy, Kraievski, Krajevskij)	Краевская (Krayevskaya, Kraievskaia, Krajevskaja)
Ukrainian (Romanization)	Краєвський (Krayevskyi, Krayevskyy, Kraievskyi, Krajevskyj)	Краєвська (Krayevska, Kraievska, Krajevska)

== People ==
- Adam Krajewski (1929–2000), Polish fencer
- Aleksander Albert Krajewski (1818–1903), Polish publicist and translator
- Andrey Krayevsky (1810–1889), Russian publisher and journalist
- Anna Żemła-Krajewska (born 1979), Polish judoka
- Henry B. Krajewski (1912–1966), American politician
- Joan L. Krajewski (1934–2013), American politician
- Julia Krajewski (born 1988), German equestrian
- Konrad Krajewski (born 1963), Polish clergyman, Vatican official
- Krzysztof Krajewski (born 1963), Polish diplomat
- Marek Krajewski (born 1966), Polish crime writer and linguist
- Michał Dymitr Krajewski (1746–1817), Polish writer and educational activist
- Mirosław Krajewski (born 1946), Polish politician
- Mirosława Krajewska (1940–2023), Polish actress
- Monika Krajewska, Polish artist
- Przemysław Krajewski (born 1987), Polish handball player
- Rick Krajewski (born 1991), American politician
- Seweryn Krajewski (born 1947), Polish singer and songwriter
- Stanisław Krajewski (born 1950), Polish philosopher
- Teodora Krajewska (1854–1935), Polish physician
- Tom Krajewski (born 1977), American television writer and podcaster
