= Krayevsky =

Krayevsky (feminine: Krayevskaya) is a Russian-language surname, a counterpart of the Polish surname Krajewski. Notable people with the surname include:

- Aleksandr Krayevsky (1932–1999), Russian scientist, espert in molecular biology and bioorganic chemistry
- Andrey Krayevsky (1810–1899), Russian publisher and journalist
- Nikolay Krayevsky (1905–1985), Soviet oncologist and pathologist
- Volodar Krayevsky (1926–2010), Russian scientist in pedagogy
