= Fusion Energy Foundation =

American think tank co-founded by Lyndon LaRouche

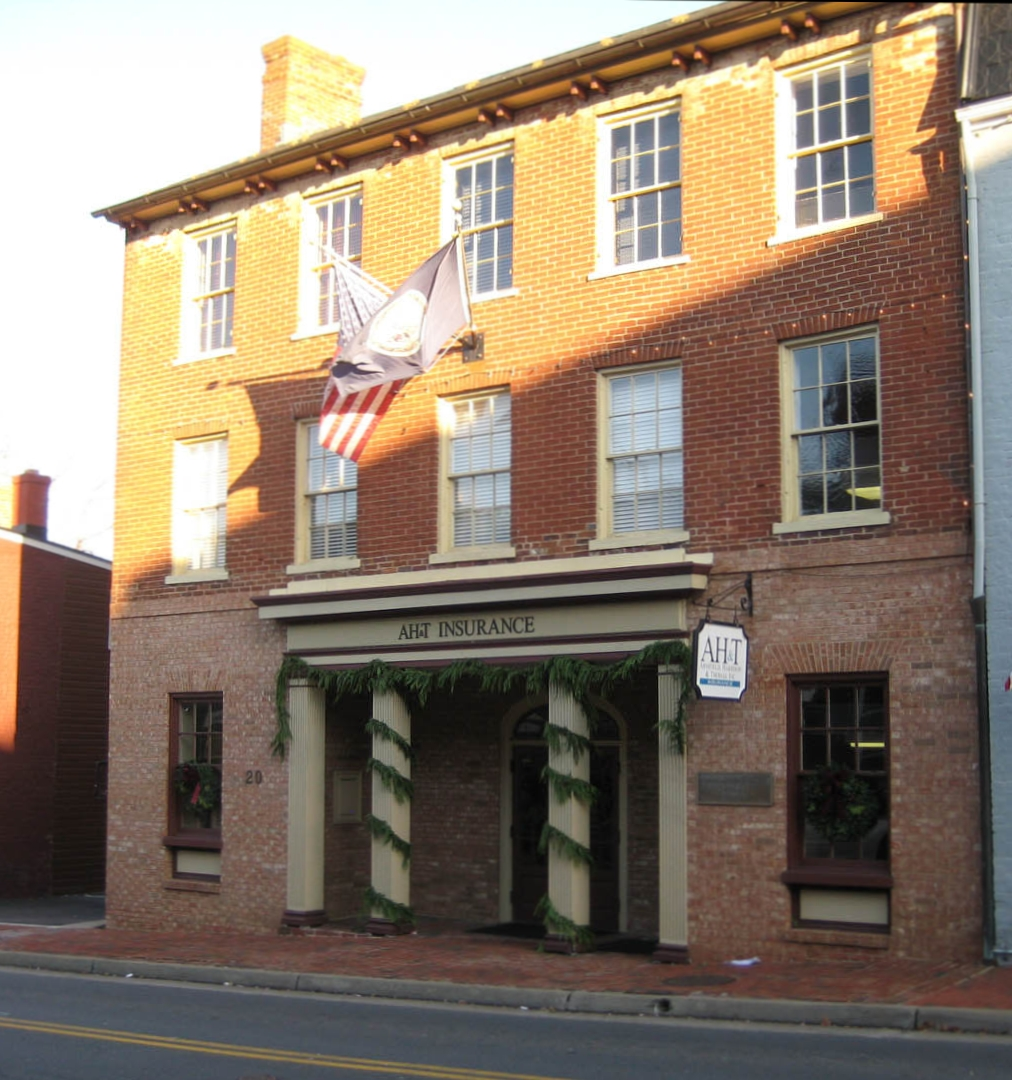
- Offices of Fusion Energy Foundation and other LaRouche entities in Leesburg, Virginia
- Abbreviation: FEF
- Formation: 1974
- Dissolved: 1986
- Type: Non-profit
- Legal status: Defunct
- Headquarters: 231 West 29 St., New York City, New York (1974–1984); 20 South King St., Leesburg, Virginia (1984–1986)
- Founder: Lyndon LaRouche
- Main organ: Fusion
- Affiliations: LaRouche movement

Fusion Energy Foundation (FEF) was an American non-profit think tank co-founded by Lyndon LaRouche in 1974 in New York. It promoted the construction of nuclear power plants, research into fusion power and beam weapons and other causes. The FEF was called fusion's greatest private supporter. It was praised by scientists like John Clarke, who said that the fusion community owed it a "debt of gratitude". By 1980, its main publication, Fusion, claimed 80,000 subscribers.

The FEF included notable scientists and others on its boards, along with LaRouche movement insiders in management positions. It published a popular magazine, Fusion, and a more technical journal as well as books and pamphlets. It conducted seminars and its members testified at legislative hearings. It was known for soliciting subscriptions to their magazines in U.S. airports, where its confrontational methods resulted in conflicts with celebrities and the general public.

The FEF has been described by many writers as a "front" for the U.S. Labor Party and the LaRouche movement. By the mid-1980s, the FEF was being accused of fraudulent fundraising on behalf of other LaRouche entities. Federal prosecutors forced it into bankruptcy in 1986 to collect contempt of court fines, a decision that was later overturned when a federal bankruptcy court found that the government had acted "in bad faith". Key personnel were convicted in 1988.

== Personnel ==
According to an article in The Nation, the Fusion Energy Foundation had physicists, corporate executives, and government planners on its board of advisors, many unaware of the foundations connection to the U.S. Labor Party, while the board of directors was filled with LaRouche movement regulars and some party outsiders.

A 1983 report published by The Heritage Foundation said that the foundation briefly gained the confidence of respected scientists who lent their reputations to it but it warned that they risked their reputations by doing so.

Lyndon LaRouche was a co-founder and one of the three members of the foundation's board of directors. Steven Bardwell, a nuclear physicist, was another director. The executive director was Morris Levitt in the 1970s and Paul Gallagher in the 1980s. Michael Gelber was the Central New York regional representative. Dennis Speed was the regional coordinator for Boston and Harley Schlanger was the southern regional coordinator. Uwe Parpart Henke was the director of research. Jon Gilbertson was the director of nuclear engineering. Marsha Freeman was a representative of the FEF's International Press Service. Charles B. Stevens, a chemical engineer, authored scores of articles on fusion energy research and development for both the earlier publication, The Fusion Energy Foundation Newsletter, and its successor, Fusion.

Eric Lerner was director of physics in 1977. Other notable scientists who wrote for FEF publications and lectured under its auspices include Friedwardt Winterberg, Krafft Arnold Ehricke, and Winston H. Bostick. Melvin B. Gottlieb received an award from the FEF. Adolf Busemann also received an award at a special dinner.

== Advocacy ==
=== Nuclear energy ===
In 1977, Executive Director Morris Levitt asserted that nuclear fusion power plants could be built by 1990 if the U.S. spent $50 to $100 billion on research. The same year he predicted that there would be no United States in the 21st century if President Jimmy Carter's ban on building breeder reactors was maintained. The director of the fusion power program at Argonne National Laboratory, Charles Baker, said in 1983 that the FEF was "overstating" the prospect of practical fusion power in the near future. "The judgment of the vast majority of the people actually working in fusion believe it will take substantially longer" than the few years predicted by the FEF, according to Baker.

By 1980, the Fusion Energy Foundation had close contacts with fusion researchers. They became a conduit for information between researchers who were sequestered in secret research. Even the head of fusion research for the Federal Government cooperated with the foundation. It was praised by scientists like John Clarke, who said that the fusion community owed it a "debt of gratitude". However the politicization of the foundation's journals and the LaRouche views printed in them repelled the scientists involved, according to The Nation.

The FEF received publicity in 1981 when it published a book explaining how to build a hydrogen bomb written by University of Nevada, Reno, professor Friedwardt Winterberg. The publication came two years after a magazine, The Progressive, had tried to print similar information but was prevented by an injunction that became the United States v. The Progressive. The government dropped the case after the information was published by the FEF. The author of the original article later learned that a diagram by Uwe Papert published in 1976 in a LaRouche publication contained two important details of the weapon's design that he had been wrong about.

The colonization of Mars is a major proposal of the LaRouche movement. Friedwardt Winterberg described how rocket engines incorporating fusion micro-explosions could provide enough acceleration to convey a large mass in a reasonable amount of time, a concept derived from Project Daedalus.

=== Independent Commission of Inquiry ===
In 1979 the Fusion Energy Foundation created the Independent Commission of Inquiry to investigate the accident at the Three Mile Island nuclear power plant. The commission's members included Morris Levitt, Jon Gilbertson, Charles Bonilia. The commission determined that the accident must have been caused by sabotage because no other explanation was possible. According to Gallagher, "New evidence is accumulating that sabotage very likely occurred". According to the Herald newspaper of Titusville, Pennsylvania, when asked by reporters for evidence Gilbertson said he had none.

=== Beam weapons ===
According to Fusion, two members of the FEF went to the Soviet Union to attend conference on "laser interaction" in December 1978.

In 1982 and 1983, members of the LaRouche movement met repeatedly with the director of defense programs for the National Security Council, Ray Pollock, while he was developing the basis for Ronald Reagan's "Star Wars" program, officially called the Strategic Defense Initiative (SDI). Pollock eventually said in the National Security Council (NSC) that LaRouche is "a frightening kind of fellow". The FEF held a seminar on beam weapons in October 1983, at the Dirksen Senate Office Building. According to the American Physical Society, FEF members disrupted a 1986 conference on SDI to which they were not invited, and only stopped after being threatened with police action.

After Ronald Reagan announced SDI the LaRouche movement made claims for having been the originators of the proposal, which reportedly "concerned" some people in the administration and in Congress, but no correction was made by them. The FEF lobbied state legislatures and testified before congressional hearings on behalf of beam weapons. Steven Bardwell resigned from the board of advisors in early 1984, reportedly because of money questions and a belief that the organization was losing its independence by becoming too solicitous of the Reagan administration in general, and in particular the Central Intelligence Agency, the Defense Intelligence Agency, and the NSC.

=== Other advocacy ===
As with other LaRouche entities, representatives of the Fusion Energy Foundation gave testimony to a number of congressional hearings. In addition to addressing committees on energy matters, FEF representatives, including Eric Lerner, also testified on matters such as the nomination of Cyrus Vance for Secretary of State.

The FEF campaigned on behalf of Arthur Rudolph, a NASA rocket scientist who was forced to leave the U.S. in 1982 following an investigation into his role in the Mittelwerk rocket factory in Nazi Germany.

Psychiatrist Ned Rosinsky spoke as a representative of the FEF at a Wisconsin state legislative hearing on criminal penalties for drug possession in 1977. He testified that "marijuana is a medically dangerous drug until proved otherwise", citing studies showing brain damage and a reduction in white blood cells caused by the habitual use of cannabis.

Under the auspices of Pakdee Tanapura, a wealthy Thai landowner, the FEF and EIR held a seminar in 1983 on the proposed construction of the Kra Canal across Thailand. Their plan favored the use of nuclear explosions to speed excavation. A second seminar was held in 1984, and in 1986 the FEF published a report by U.H. Von Papart on the feasibility and financing for the project.

=== Conferences ===
- May 2, 1978: "Conference on the Industrial Development of Southern Africa", held in Washington D.C.
- October 1980: "A High Technology Policy for U.S. Reindustrialization", held in California.
- 1985: "Krafft Ehricke Memorial Conference", held in Reston, Virginia. Cosponsored by the Schiller Institute.

== Fundraising ==
The FEF has been described by many writers as a "front" for the U.S. Labor Party and the LaRouche movement, In a National Review article published in 1979, former member Gregory Rose said that the primary purpose of the Fusion Energy Foundation was raising money. Milton Copulous, director of energy studies for The Heritage Foundation, called FEF "a front the USLP uses to win the confidence of unsuspecting businessmen". In 1981, the FEF reported $3.5 million of revenue.

According to a representative in Toronto, Richard Sanders, FEF contributions gathered in Canada were sent to the United States to support the presidential campaigns of Lyndon LaRouche. In 1983, an FEF spokesperson said that there was no financial link between the foundation and LaRouche's campaigns. Although the FEF denied any financial connection to LaRouche's U.S. Labor Party, the two organizations reportedly shared offices in New York City. According to an interview with a former member presented as evidence in LaRouche vs. NBC in 1984:

Money from the . . . profit-making organizations went into political campaigns and was not correctly reported. Money from the tax-exempt [FEF] was given to the political campaign, unbeknownst to the people who made the contributions. . . . Someone would contribute to the [FEF] because they believed in nuclear power and their contribution would turn up as a contribution for . . . [LaRouche's] presidential campaign.

Barbara Mikulski filed a complaint with the Federal Election Commission asserting that the FEF was improperly raising funds for a LaRouche-affiliated candidate, Debra Freeman, in a 1982 congressional campaign. The FEF replied that the fundraising was done under contract to the Caucus Distributors, Inc. (CDI), another LaRouche enterprise.

When FEF director Steven Bardwell resigned in 1984, he complained that funds raised by the FEF through subscriptions were being diverted to other LaRouche entities. According to Bardwell, LaRouche said that Bardwell's sense of obligation to subscribers was "misplaced", and that "whether or not they knew it, they had contributed money to support Lyndon LaRouche and his ideas". LaRouche reportedly also said that the most important expenditures were for his personal security, and other expenses had a lower priority.

In September 1985, the Internal Revenue Service (IRS) withdrew the FEF's status as a tax-deductible non-profit, Section 501(c)(3), which it had had since 1978. The stated reason was that it had failed to file a tax return in the prior two years. In October 1986, New York Attorney General Robert Abrams sued to dissolve the FEF, charging that it fraudulently solicited donations as tax-deductible after their exemption had been withdrawn, and for failure to file required forms. Paul Gallagher, described the suit as "part of an escalating witch hunt against FEF board member Lyndon LaRouche." Two weeks later, the IRS restored the FEF's tax exempt status, saying it had made an error though privacy rules prevented further elaboration.

Subscribers to Fusion complained that their credit cards were being billed for unauthorized charges. In one example a man who had subscribed to Fusion found that he had been billed for $1000, for which he received promissory notes in the mail. Prosecutors charged that the FEF and other LaRouche related groups had made improper charges to the credit cards of about 1,000 people.

Fundraisers also solicited larger sums. A 71-year-old California woman loaned the FEF $100,000 after making smaller loans to other LaRouche-related entities. FEF fundraisers refused to take a check and drove her to the bank so she could wire the money directly. The FEF made no interest or principal payments on the loans. After she sued the FEF for repayment they settled, acknowledged the loans, and agreed to a schedule of payments. They stopped making payments after sending a few checks, one of which bounced. She filed suit in Virginia in an attempt to attach FEF assets there.

In a widely reported case, a 79-year-old retired steel executive gave or loaned a total of $2.6 million over a 14 months period in amounts ranging from $250 to $350,000, according to a lawsuit. He said he was not a supporter of LaRouche political campaigns, and that he gave the money, "Because I got so many telephone calls requesting donations". He said "I'm mad at myself now" for having turned over the money, most of which went to the FEF. When he told the fundraisers that he only wanted to give money to his family in the future, he was reportedly told that gifts to the LaRouche movement "would be of greater benefit" to the family because LaRouche's supporters "were changing the world situation". The FEF gave the donor a plaque which said, "Benjamin Franklin Award Honoring Special Contributions to the Future of Science". In a Nightline interview, LaRouche called him "a person who's been associated with us as a supporter for a long time." LaRouche's treasurer, Edward Spannaus, said the "drug lobby" was responsible for accusations that the LaRouche movement had encouraged supporters to turn over their savings.

During a 1986 Virginia state investigation, an undercover policeman purchased subscriptions to Fusion and another LaRouche movement publication, Executive Intelligence Review, at Washington National Airport. He then received 22 "abusive and demanding" telephone calls asking for loans or donations. He was told the money was needed to fight AIDS and to keep LaRouche out of jail. When he agreed to make a loan he received a letter of acknowledgement and an invitation to tour the LaRouche headquarters in Leesburg, Virginia.

Not all supporters contributed due to pressure. An Oklahoman oilman subscribed to Fusion and liked LaRouche's views on nuclear power. He donated thousands of dollars as well as buying a $900,000 estate for LaRouche's use, charging rent to cover the mortgage.

=== Airports ===
Supporters of the Fusion Energy Foundation became well known for their aggressive fundraising in U.S. airports in the late 1970s and early 1980s, along with Hare Krishnas and Moonies. They set up tables to sell publications from the FEF and other LaRouche organizations and displayed provocatively captioned, hand-lettered posters. The FEF members would shout slogans to passers-by to get attention, and sometimes accused those who disagreed with them of being homosexuals. One writer called them the "most obnoxious of the groups...infesting the airports." An article in The Boston Globe called them "the kooks at the airport" who solicited money using posters often denouncing Jane Fonda, a target of the LaRouche movement because of her support for environmental causes.

The FEF had slogans and bumper stickers with texts like:

- Beam the Bomb
- More nukes, less kooks
- Nuclear plants are built better than Jane Fonda
- Nuke Jane Fonda
- Feed Jane Fonda to the Whales

In 1981, Fonda's brother, actor Peter Fonda was enraged by a sign in Denver's Stapleton Airport that said, "Feed Jane Fonda to the Whales." He cut up the sign with his pocketknife. The FEF members pressed charges for destruction of property leading Fonda to miss his flight, though he was allowed to leave without posting bond. The case was dropped when the FEF members failed to appear on the court date.

In 1982, Ellen Kaplan, an FEF member raising money in the Newark Airport, spotted former Secretary of State Henry Kissinger and his wife Nancy. Kissinger was flying to Boston for a heart operation. Kaplan went up to Kissinger and asked him why he had "prolonged the war in Vietnam", and then, "Mr. Kissinger, do you sleep with young boys at the Carlyle Hotel?" At that point Nancy Kissinger grabbed Kaplan by the throat and asked, "Do you want to get slugged?" Kaplan later explained that she was a "longtime opponent" of Kissinger, and that she "wanted to confront the man with how low he is." She pressed charges and Dennis Speed, an FEF coordinator, said they would make Kissinger into "a laughingstock". The Newark municipal judge acquitted Mrs. Kissinger, saying that she had exhibited "a reasonable spontaneous, somewhat human reaction" and that there was no injury.

== Legal issues ==
In 1977, the Fusion Energy Foundation received a temporary injunction to prevent the Federal Bureau of Investigation (FBI) from harassing it or interfering with its activities. The suit claimed that the FBI Director, Clarence M. Kelley, had personally ordered FBI agents to disrupt FEF conferences and dissuade scientists from participating. The injunction also included U.S. Attorney General Griffin Bell and Secretary of Energy James R. Schlesinger.

In 1986, the FEF was ordered by a state court to stop raising funds in California due to complaints. In a separate action the same year, the FEF, along with other LaRouche entities, was named in a lawsuit charging violations of the Federal Racketeer Influenced and Corrupt Organizations Act (RICO) that was filed in San Francisco. In an unusual move, the assets of the FEF and related entities were seized before the suit was unsealed, because the plaintiff's lawyer convinced the judge that the entities would hide their assets. In 1987, the FEF and five other LaRouche entities were prohibited from operating in Virginia. In 1988, the FEF was sued by the California Attorney General's office. The suit alleged that FEF fundraisers had flown down from Washington to take the 79-year old Laguna Hills resident to her bankbox where they got from her stock certificates worth $104,452, described by her accountant as the woman's life savings. In their place was a receipt signed by Paul Gallagher, executive director of the FEF. LaRouche said the charges were "totally frivolous" and the result of corruption in the Attorney General's office.

During a federal grand jury investigation into fundraising practices in 1985, the FEF and other LaRouche entities were given subpoenas requiring that they turn over documents and provide a keeper of records to testify. They failed to surrender the documents and the keepers of records they sent were appointed the day before. When ordered to give the home address of FEF Executive Director Gallagher, the address turned out to be a vacant lot. Five months after the subpoenas were served, and after several hearings on the matter, U.S. District Judge A. David Mazzone found the FEF in contempt of court and levied a fine of $10,000 per day to enforce the subpoena starting in March 1986. Similar fines were placed on other LaRouche organizations, totalling $45,000 per day. The FEF and the other LaRouche entities appealed the fines repeatedly, and were denied each time. They appealed to the U.S. Supreme Court, which refused to review the lower court decision.

In October 1986, hundreds of federal and state law enforcement conducted a coordinated raid on the offices of LaRouche enterprises, including those of the FEF, and seized the documents that had been subpoenaed in 1985. The FEF and other entities argued in court that the search warrants had been improperly executed, and that documents were taken in violation of their Fourth Amendment rights. The Court of Appeals denied their appeal.

Six months later, in April 1987, the federal prosecutors obtained an unusual involuntary bankruptcy procedure against the FEF and other groups in order to settle the contempt of court fines which had grown to $21.4 million. The government claimed that the LaRouche groups were selling properties in order to hide the cash. The petition was granted by Judge Martin V.B. Bostetter and the federal government seized the property of the FEF and other groups. Reportedly, they only recovered $86,000 in assets. In October 1989, the FEF's bankruptcy petition was reviewed by Judge Bostetter who dismissed it, effectively reversing his April 1987 ruling. He noted that two of the entities, including FEF, were nonprofit fund-raisers and therefore ineligible for involuntary bankruptcy actions. He found that the government's actions and representations in obtaining the bankruptcy had the effect of misleading the court as to the status of the organization.

Members of the scientific and fusion community noted the closing of the FEF publications. A full-page advertisement protesting the closures, published in IEEE Spectrum, was signed by people associated with the fusion and SDI fields, including 22 employees of the Lawrence Livermore National Laboratory.

== Publications ==
=== International Journal of Fusion Energy ===
The International Journal of Fusion Energy was published intermittently from March 1977 to October 1985, putting out at least 11 issues. For some time Robert James Moon acted as editor-in-chief.

=== Fusion Magazine ===
Morris Levitt was the editor-in-chief as of 1979, but by the mid-1980s the job was taken over by Steven Bardwell, and by 1986 it was Carol White. Marjorie Mazel Hecht was the managing editor. By 1980, it claimed 80,000 subscribers.

=== 21st Century Science and Technology ===
21st Century Science and Technology is a quarterly magazine established in 1988 following the federal government's closing down of its predecessor Fusion Magazine (1977 to 1987). It has the same editor and material as Fusion. The last hard copy issue of the magazine published was the Winter 2005-2006 issue. Subsequent issues are available in electronic PDF format only. The magazine deals with a variety of issues, including criticism of claims of anthropogenic global warming, promotion of the use of DDT and support for an alternative to the standard atomic theory, based on the "Moon model" of Robert James Moon. Notable writers include: J. Gordon Edwards, Zbigniew Jaworowski and Paul Marmet. According to Science and other sources, it is published by supporters of Lyndon LaRouche.

=== Notable books and pamphlets ===
- The Physical Principles of Thermonuclear Explosive Devices by Friedwardt Winterberg, 1981

As 21st Century Science Associates:

- The holes in the ozone scare: the scientific evidence that the sky isn't falling By Rogelio Maduro, Ralf Schauerhammer, 1992 ISBN 0-9628134-0-0
