= Marcin Przeciszewski =

Polish historian, journalist and Catholic activist

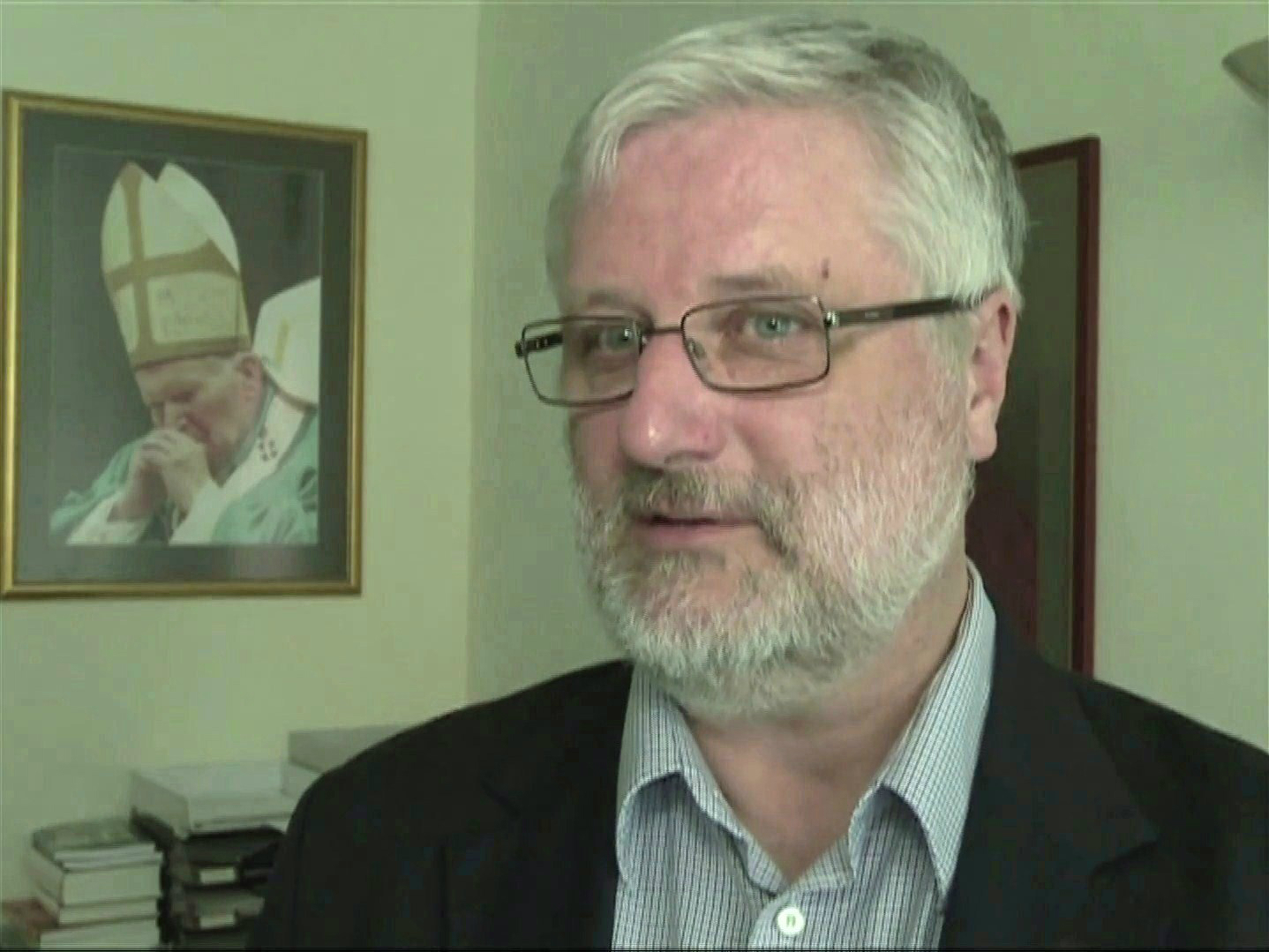
- Parents: Tadeusz Przeciszewski (father); Hanna Iłowiecka-Przeciszewska (mother)
- Relatives: Renata Maria Grzegorczykowa, Andrzej Grzegorczyk

Marcin Przeciszewski is a Polish historian, journalist and Catholic activist. Since 1993 he has been president of the Catholic Information Agency.

== Biography ==
Since 1993, Przeciszewski has been the editor-in-chief and the president of the Catholic Information Agency (KAI).

== Awards and accolades ==
- St. Albert medal (2005).
