= Guenthner =

Guenthner is a surname. Notable people with the surname include:

- Franz Guenthner (born 1946), German linguist and professor
- Louie R. Guenthner Jr. (1944–2012), American attorney and politician
- Birth family name of Elizabeth Nabel, American cardiologist

== See also ==
- Günther (surname)
