= Taras Levkiv =

Ukrainian artist (1940–2025)

- Тарас Левків
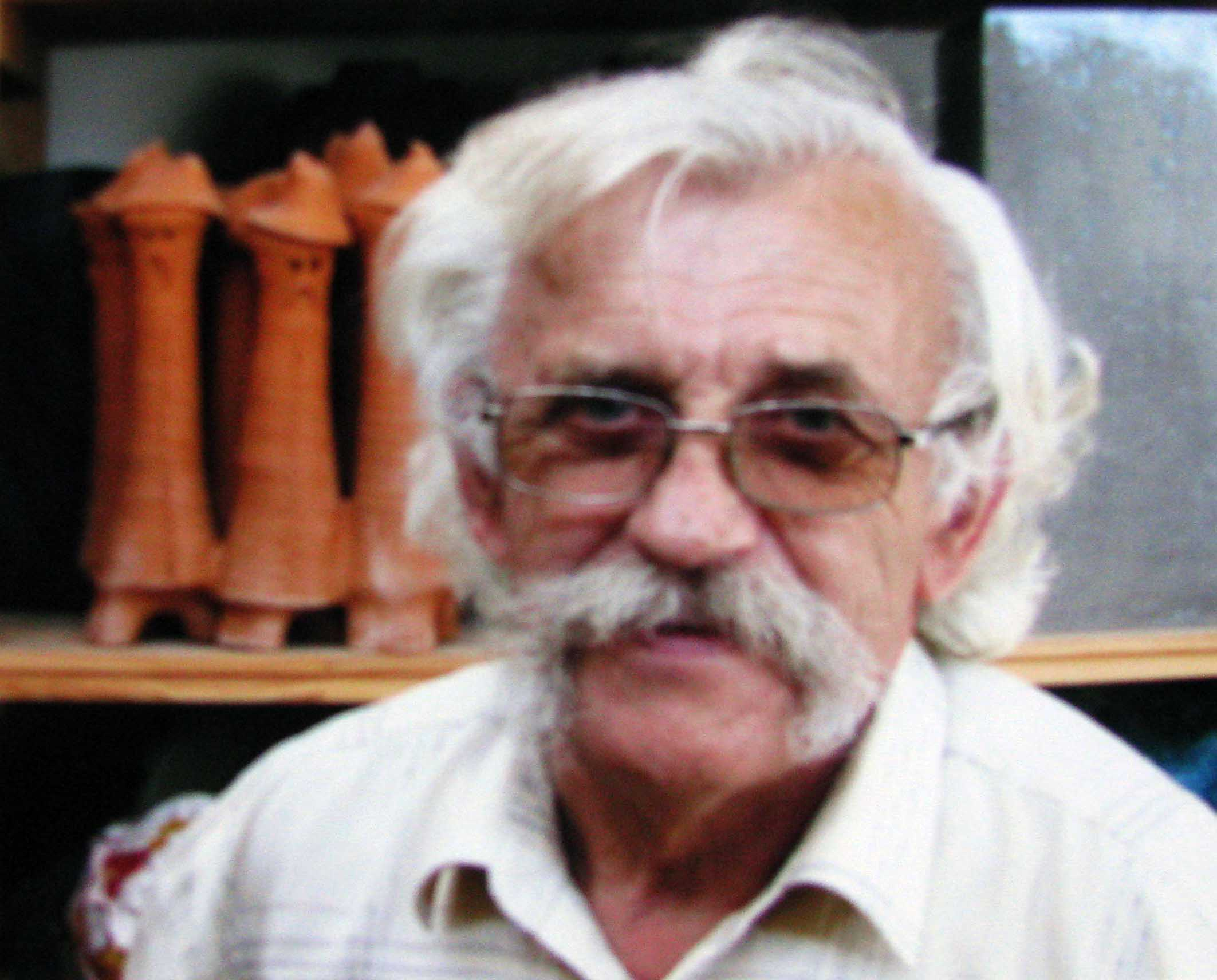
- Born: 25 June 1940; Mala Berezovytsia, Zbarazh Raion, Ternopil Oblast, Ukrainian SSR, USSR
- Died: 9 March 2025 (aged 84); Vynnyky, Lviv Oblast, Ukraine
- Resting place: Lychakiv Cemetery
- Education: Ivan Trush Lviv State College of Decorative and Fine Arts
- Style: Ceramic art

Taras Bohdanovych Levkiv (Ukrainian: Тарас Богданович Левків; 25 June 1940 – 9 March 2025) was a Ukrainian artist who specialised in ceramic art. From the 1980s, he was the head of the Department of Art Ceramics at Ivan Trush Lviv State College of Decorative and Fine Arts. Levkiv died in Vynnyky, Lviv Oblast on 9 March 2025, at the age of 84.
