= Mieczysław Albert Krąpiec =

Polish priest and philosopher (1921–2008)

Mieczysław Albert Krąpiec OP
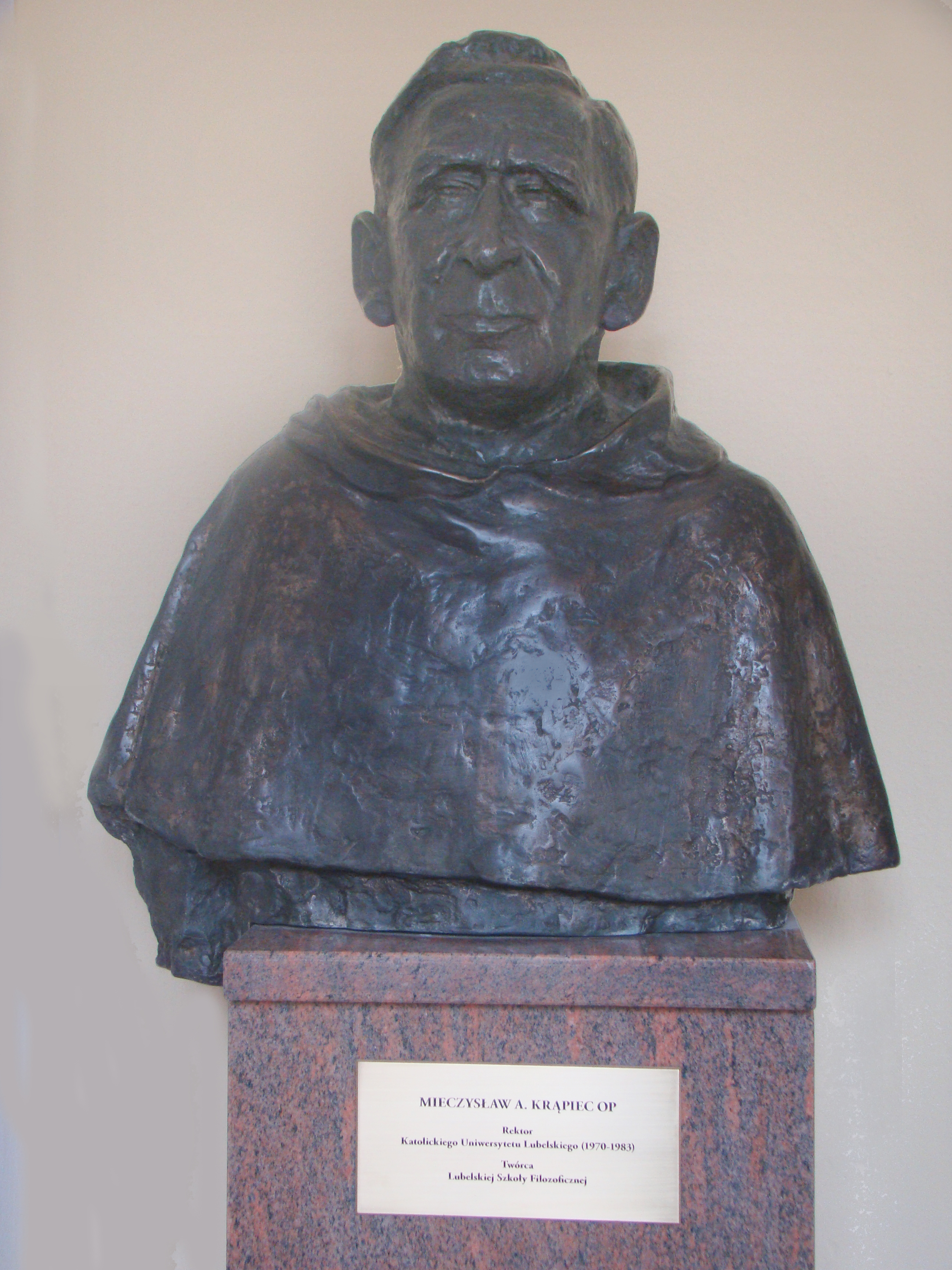
- Bust of Krąpiec at the Catholic University of Lublin

Personal life
- Born: 25 May 1921 Mala Berezovytsia
- Died: 8 May 2008 (aged 86) Lublin
- Education: College of Philosophy & Theology; Pontifical University of Saint Thomas Aquinas (PhD); Catholic University of Lublin (PhD)

Religious life
- Religion: Christianity
- Order: Dominican Order
- Profession: 8 July 1943
- Ordination: 17 June 1945

Mieczysław Albert Maria Krąpiec OP (25 May 1921 – 8 May 2008) was a Polish Thomist philosopher, theologian and rector of John Paul II Catholic University of Lublin between 1970 and 1983. Krąpiec was a founder of the Lublin school of Thomism.

== Biography ==
Krąpiec was born in Mala Berezovytsia. After attending elementary school in his village, he attended a classical gymnasium in Tarnopol, where he was taught ancient Greek and Latin. After obtaining his matura in June 1939, he joined the Dominican Order in Kraków. During Nazi occupation, he was instructed in philosophy and theology at the College of Philosophy & Theology. He professed his religious vows on 8 July 1943, and was ordained a priest on 17 June 1945. He then received a doctorate in philosophy from the Pontifical University of Saint Thomas Aquinas after defending his dissertation De naturali amore Dei super omnia in creaturis. After obtaining his doctorate, he began studying theology at the Catholic University of Lublin; he obtained a doctorate in theology from the Catholic University of Lublin in 1948, with his dissertation De amore hypostatico in Sanctissima Trinitate secundum St. Thomam Aquinatem.

Krąpiec received his habilitation from the Catholic University of Lublin in 1951; afterwards, he began giving lectures on metaphysics and epistemology at the University. In the 1950s, he founded the Lublin school of philosophy, which was inspired by neo-scholasticism and served as "an important antidote to the Marxist philosophy" that was predominant in the Eastern Bloc, according to Wojciech Chudy – its members would eventually include Pope John Paul II. Beginning on 1 January 1955, he served as head of its Department of Metaphysics and the Theory of Knowledge. He became an associate professor on 6 December 1956; he was raised to university professor in 1962 and given tenure in 1968.

Krąpiec served as the University's dean of Faculty of Christian Philosophy between 1958 & 1961, and later between 1969 & 1970, before beginning his term as rector of the University on 1 October 1970. He would serve a total of 5 terms as the University's rector between 1970 and 1983. He received honoris causa degrees from the Pontifical Institute of Mediaeval Studies in 1989 and UCLouvain in 1990. In 1996, he helped found the Polish Society of Thomas Aquinas. Krąpiec died on 8 May 2008 in Lublin.

== Bibliography ==
- Pańpuch, Zbigniew, ed. (2020). Mieczysław Albert Krąpiec (PDF). Ignatianum University Press. ISBN 978-83-7614-474-0.
- Chudy, Wojciech (2018). "Mieczysław Albert Krąpiec in The Universal Encyclopedia of Philosophy". Studia Gilsoniana. 7 (4): 549–566. doi:10.26385/sg.070428.
