= Zygmunt Zawirski =

Polish philosopher and logician (1882–1948)

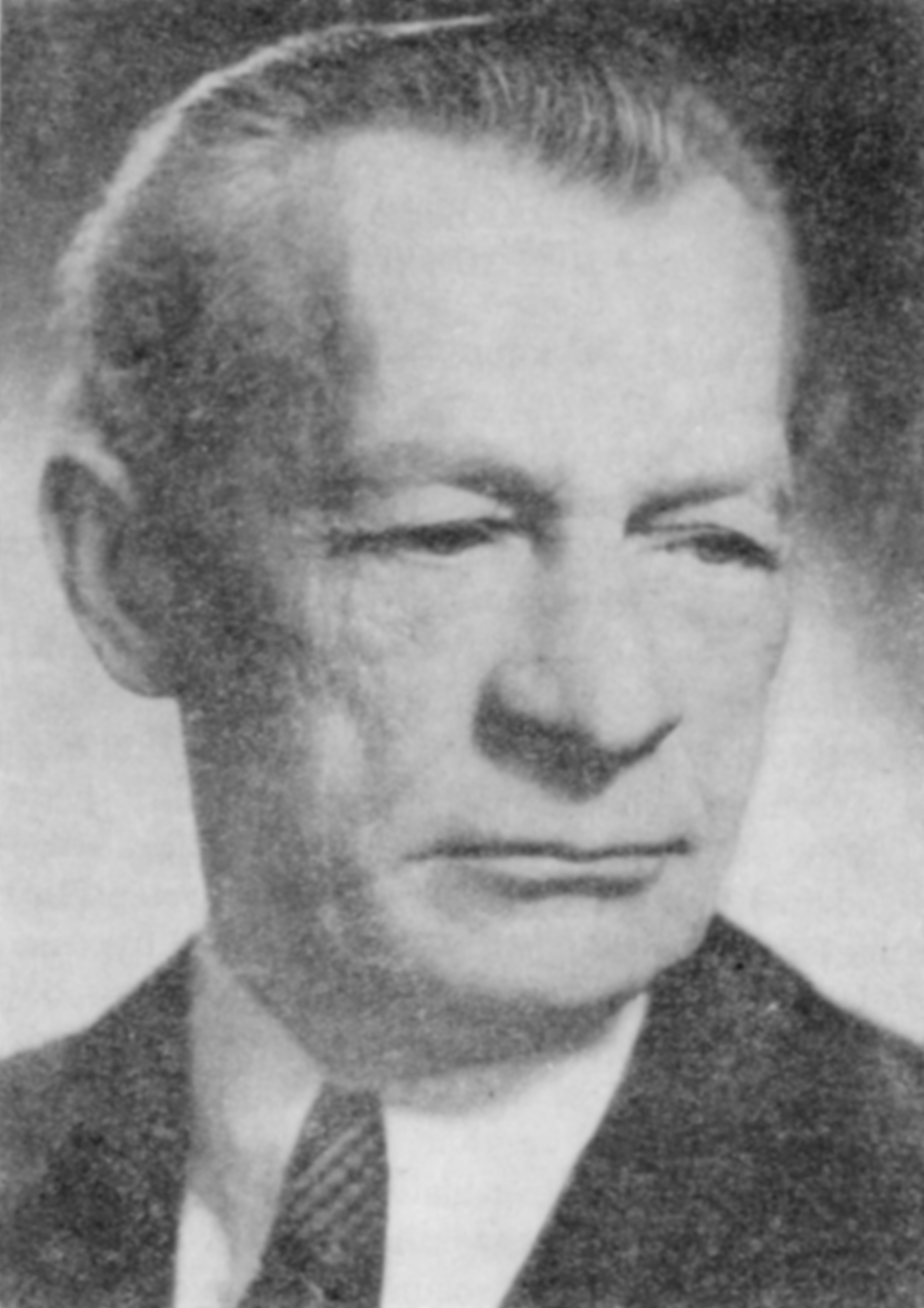
Zygmunt Zawirski

Zygmunt Zawirski (29 July 1882 – 2 April 1948) was a Polish philosopher and logician.

His main field of study was philosophy of physics, history of science, multi-valued logic and relation of multi-valued logic to calculus of probability.

== Biography ==
Zawirski was born on 29 July 1882 in the village of Berezowica Mała (Mala Berezovytsia) near Zbarazh (now Ukraine). In 1928 he became a professor of the Adam Mickiewicz University in Poznań and in 1937 professor of the Jagiellonian University in Kraków. In 1936 he became an editor of Kwartalnik Filozoficzny ("Philosophical Quarterly"). After 1945, he was president of the Krakowskie Towarzystwo Filozoficzne ("Kraków Philosophical Society").

He died on 2 April 1948 in Końskie, Poland.

== Notable works ==
- Zawirski, Zygmunt (1936). L'évolution de la notion du temps (in French). Cracovie, etc.: Gebethner et Wolff. OCLC 10599561.
