= Monika Krajewska =

Polish-Jewish calligrapher

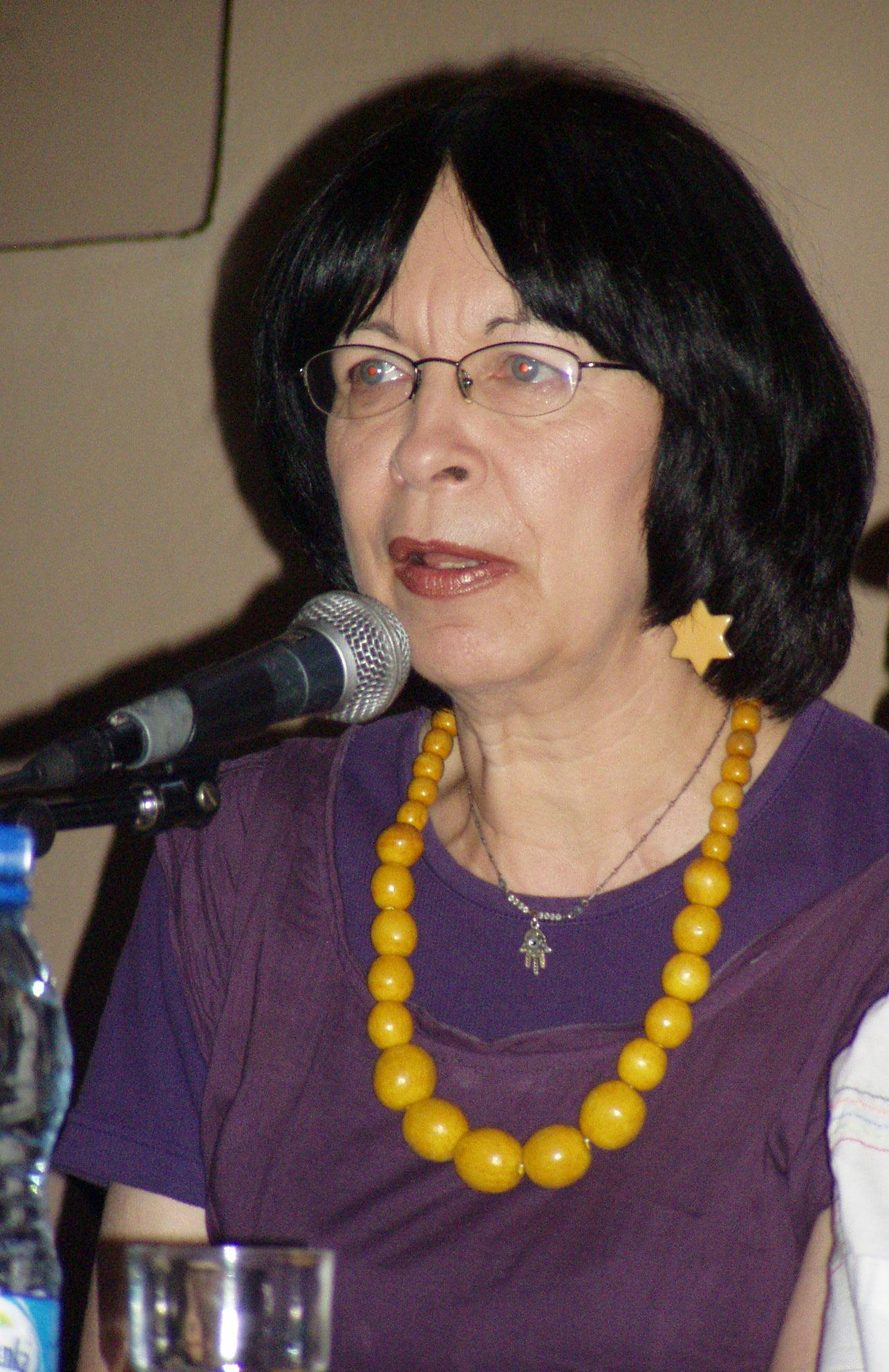
- Monika Krajewska
- Born: Warsaw, Poland
- Occupations: Artist, writer, calligrapher, activist
- Spouse: Stanisław Krajewski

Monika Krajewska is a Polish activist, mizrah artist, writer, photographer, and Jewish gravestone art and Hebrew language calligraphy specialist.

== Biography ==
Monika Krajewska was born in Warsaw. She is married to a philosopher and Polish consultant of American Jewish Committee, Stanisław Krajewski.

At present Monika Krajewska is a teacher at Lauder-Morash Private Jewish School in Warsaw.

She is a member of The Guild of American Papercutters and Jewish Community of Warsaw.

A recipient (jointly with her husband) of the Lifetime Achievement Award of the Taube Foundation for Jewish Life & Culture and American Jewish Committee, presented during the 23rd Jewish Culture Festival in Kraków.

== Books ==
- 1982 – Czas kamieni – translated to English as Stones time and French as Le temps des pierres
- 2009 – Mój młodszy brat (en. My younger brother)
