= Stanisław Krajewski =

Polish philosopher

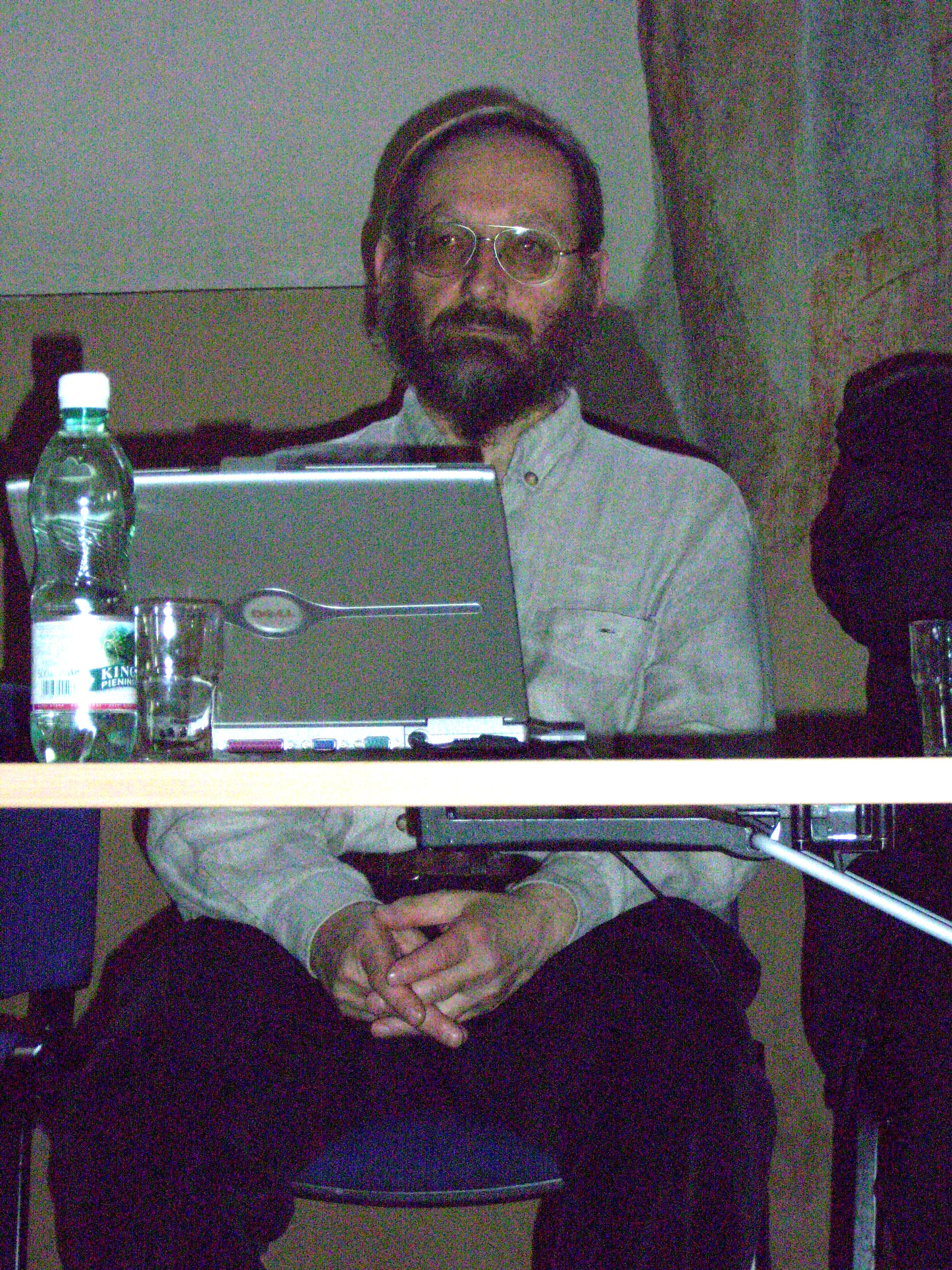
- Born: 1950 (age 75–76); Warsaw, Poland
- Education: Faculty of Mathematics, University of Warsaw
- Occupations: Mathematician, Philosopher and Writer
- Title: Professor of humanities
- Spouse: Monika Krajewska
- Children: 2

Stanisław Krajewski (born 1950) is a Polish philosopher, mathematician and writer, activist of the Jewish minority in Poland.

== Biography ==
He is professor of philosophy at the University of Warsaw, author, leader of the Jewish community in Poland and co-chairman of the Polish Council of Christians and Jews.

Born in Warsaw in 1950, he studied at the Faculty of Mathematics, University of Warsaw, obtained PhD. in mathematics at the Institute of Mathematics of the Polish Academy of Sciences, and later Habilitation degree in philosophy at the Faculty of Philosophy and Sociology of the University of Warsaw. In 2012 he was awarded the title of “professor of humanities” by the President of Poland.

Krajewski taught at the Bialystok branch of the University of Warsaw (1975 - 1981), later at the Institute of Mathematics, Polish Academy of Sciences. Since 1997 he has taught at the Institute of Philosophy of the University of Warsaw and chaired the Institute’s Scientific Council since 2012.

Krajewski was involved in dissident activities during the communist period, was member of “Solidarity” from the beginning in 1980 till 1990, the underground period included. Immediately after the fall of communism in 1989, Krajewski was among the founders of the Polish-Israeli Friendship Society as well as the Polish Council of Christians and Jews. He has been the Jewish co-chairman of the Council since its inception in 1989.

- He served on the board of the Union of Jewish Religious Communities in Poland (1997-2006)

- He was the Polish consultant to the American Jewish Committee (1992-2009)

- He was member of the International Council of the Auschwitz Camp Museum and Memorial (from its beginning in 1990 until 2006)

- He has also been involved in devising the post-World War II section of the core exhibition in the Warsaw Museum of the History of Polish Jews, POLIN, opened in 2014.

Krajewski is author of publications in the field of logic and philosophy of mathematics as well as numerous books and articles on Judaism, Jewish experience and Christian-Jewish dialogue.

He is a recipient (jointly with his wife) of the Lifetime Achievement Award of the Taube Foundation for Jewish Life & Culture and American Jewish Committee, presented during the 23rd Jewish Culture Festival in Kraków.

Married to Monika Krajewska, they have two sons.

== Books ==
- 1997: Żydzi, judaizm, Polska (Jews, Judaism, Poland, in Polish, Vocatio, ISBN 83-7146-073-2)
- 2003: Twierdzenie Gödla i jego interpretacje filozoficzne: od mechanicyzmu do postmodernizmu (Goedel’s Theorem and Its Philosophical Interpretations: from Mechanism to Post-Modernism, in Polish, Wyd. Instytutu Filozofii i Socjologii PAN, ISBN 83-7388-017-8)
- 2004: 54 komentarze do Tory dla nawet najmniej religijnych spośród nas (54 Commentaries on the Torah for Even the Least Religious Among Us, in Polish, Austeria, ISBN 83-89129-02-7)
- 2005: Poland and the Jews: reflections of a Polish Polish Jew (in English, Austeria, ISBN 83-89129-22-1)
- 2007: Tajemnica Izraela a tajemnica Kościoła (The Mystery of Israel and the Mystery of the Church, in Polish, Biblioteka "Więzi", ISBN 978-83-60356-39-5)
- 2010: Nasza żydowskość (Our Jewishness, in Polish, Austeria, ISBN 978-83-61978-44-2)
- 2011: Czy matematyka jest nauką humanistyczną? (Does Mathematics Belong to the Humanities?, in Polish, Copernicus Center Press, ISBN 978-83-62259-13-7)
- 2014 Czy fizyka i matematyka to nauki humanistyczne? (Do Physics and Mathematics Belong to the Humanities? with Michał Heller, in Polish, Copernicus Center Press, ISBN 978-83-7886-078-5)
- 2014: Żydzi i... (Austeria, ISBN 978-83-7866-029-3)
- 2017: Co zawdzięczam dialogowi międzyreligijnemu i chrześcijaństwu, 1-67, What I Owe to Interreligious Dialogue and Christianity, 71-127 (Fundacja Judaica, Kraków, ISBN 978-83-936339-2-0).
- 2018: Was ich dem interreligiösen Dialog und dem Christentum verdanke, 5-77, Co zawdzięczam dialogowi międzyreligijnemu i chrześcijaństwu, 79-141(Fundacja Judaica, Kraków, ISBN 978-83-936339-4-4).
- 2019: Żydzi w Polsce – i w Tatrach też (Austeria, Kraków, ISBN 978-83-7866-242-6)
- 2022: Wybranie. O rozumieniu kilku terminów języka świętego (Austeria, Kraków, ISBN 978-83-7866-526-7)
- 2024: Small Numbers, Big Presence: Jews in Poland after World War II (Peter Lang, Berlin, ISBN 978-3-631-90084-0)

Co-editor of

- Topics in Logic, Philosophy and Foundations of Mathematics and Computer Science. In Recognition of Professor Andrzej Grzegorczyk (2007, in English, Amsterdam: IOS),
- Common Rejoicing in the Torah (2008, in Polish),
- Abraham Joshua Heschel: Philosophy, Theology and Interreligious Dialogue, ed. by S. Krajewski and A. Lipszyc (2009, in English, Wiesbaden: Harrassowitz Verlag).
- Studies in Logic, Grammar and Rhetoric 27 (40), Papers on Logic and Rationality: Festschrift in Honour of Andrzej Grzegorczyk (2012, in English, Bialystok: Univ. of Bialystok);
- Studies in Logic, Grammar and Rhetoric 44 (57), 2016, Theology in Mathematics?(ed. by Stanisław Krajewski and Kazimierz Trzęsicki); ISBN 978-83-7431-480-0
- Epistemologia doświadczenia religijnego w XX-wiecznej filozofii rosyjskiej i żydowskiej, red. Janusz Dobieszewski, Stanisław Krajewski, Jakub Mach (Kraków: Universitas; ISBN 97883-242-3425-7)
- Poznanie i religia: epistemołogia religioznowo opyta w ruskoj i jewrejskoj fiłosofskoj mysli XX wieka (Russian), eds. Janusz Dobieszewski, Stanisław Krajewski, Jakub Mach (Wyd. UW WFiS, Warszawa)
- Journal of Applied Logics — IfCoLog Journal of Logics and their Applications, Special Issue “Concept of God”, Guest Editors: Stanisław Krajewski and Ricardo Silvestre, vol 6 (6)/2019.
- Theological Discourse and Logic, Logica universalis 13(4)/2019, eds. Marcin Trepczyński and Stanisław Krajewski.
