= Robert James Moon =

American physicist, chemist and engineer

Robert James Moon (February 14, 1911 – November 1, 1989) was an American physicist, chemist and engineer. A graduate of the University of Chicago, he served on the faculty there and participated in the Manhattan Project.

== Early life and education ==
Robert James Moon (born February 14, 1911, in Springfield, Missouri) grew up in a rural environment where he developed an early interest in mechanics, electrical systems, and practical engineering. As a child, he experienced rheumatic fever and epilepsy, which limited his formal schooling for extended periods and led to independent study at home.

By approximately age eight, Moon had begun operating a small repair workshop in his family garage, machining replacement parts for automobiles and working with electrical systems. During his secondary education, he demonstrated advanced abilities in mathematics, including trigonometry and calculus, despite limited formal training, and graduated from high school early.

In 1930, at age 19, Moon traveled to Chicago and began studies at the University of Chicago, where he worked under physical chemist William Draper Harkins. His early academic interests focused on nuclear chemistry, neutron theory, and atomic structure.

== Early research and cyclotron development ==
In the mid-1930s, Moon worked with physicist Arthur Jeffrey Dempster on mass spectrometry, contributing to experiments that helped identify isotopes of uranium, including uranium-235.

In 1936, Moon completed a Ph.D. in physical chemistry at the University of Chicago. During this period, he and Harkins began designing a cyclotron for particle acceleration research. Their design incorporated multiphase acceleration techniques, using timed electrical pulses to increase efficiency compared to earlier systems.

Between 1936 and 1937, Moon, Harkins, and collaborators including Henry Newson and Louis Slotin constructed the University of Chicago cyclotron, which was used in nuclear research.

Moon completed a second Ph.D., in physics, in 1939, and continued teaching and research at the University of Chicago. His work during this period included electron diffraction studies and instrumentation development, including early radiation detection devices.

== Manhattan Project ==
Between 1940 and 1941, Moon conducted experimental studies on neutron interactions with uranium and graphite, contributing to early investigations into nuclear chain reactions.

In 1942, he carried out experiments demonstrating that trace impurities, particularly boron, in graphite significantly increased neutron absorption. This work contributed to the development of purified graphite moderators used in early nuclear reactors.

On December 2, 1942, the first controlled, self-sustaining nuclear chain reaction was achieved at Chicago Pile-1 at the University of Chicago. Moon was affiliated with the Metallurgical Laboratory during this period and contributed to experimental and instrumentation work associated with reactor development.

From 1943 to 1945, Moon worked on Manhattan Project research across multiple sites, including the Metallurgical Laboratory in Chicago, Clinton Laboratories in Oak Ridge, Tennessee, and the Hanford Site in Washington. His responsibilities included reactor instrumentation, neutron measurement, and experimental analysis.

In August 1944, Moon developed a neutron thermometer used to measure reactor conditions. He also worked on thermopile-based instruments designed to monitor neutron flux and reactor behavior, as well as other experimental detection systems.

At the Hanford Site, Moon contributed to reactor operations and instrumentation and was involved in identifying operational issues related to neutron absorption by fission products, including xenon-135, which caused periodic reactor shutdowns.

In July 1945, Moon signed the Szilárd Petition, urging that the atomic bomb be demonstrated rather than used against civilian populations.

== Postwar research and academic career ==
Following World War II, Moon remained at the University of Chicago and shifted his research focus toward radiobiology, biophysics, and medical applications of radiation.

In 1946, he participated in the formation of the Atomic Scientists of Chicago and contributed to discussions on atomic energy policy, including civilian control of nuclear technology. He supported legislation that led to the establishment of the United States Atomic Energy Commission.

During the late 1940s, Moon contributed to public education efforts on nuclear science, including publications explaining atomic energy and its implications.

In 1949, Moon developed a miniature radioactive measurement device designed for diagnostic use in the human body, particularly in cardiac applications.

In 1950, he developed a fluoroscopic imaging system using calcium fluorite crystals, allowing real-time visualization of X-ray images under normal lighting conditions. This work contributed to the development of later imaging and radiation monitoring technologies.

Also in 1950, Moon served on the Subcommittee on Instruments and Techniques at Clinton Laboratories, contributing to the development of nuclear instrumentation standards. That same year, he was interviewed by the Federal Bureau of Investigation regarding past contact with physicist Bruno Pontecorvo.

Throughout the 1950s, Moon continued research in radiation measurement, imaging technologies, and biophysical instrumentation while maintaining his academic position at the University of Chicago. He spent most of his professional life in Chicago and remained affiliated with the University of Chicago for several decades.

== Later work and geometric model ==
In the 1980s, Moon developed a geometric model of atomic structure that proposed fixed spatial arrangements for nucleons within atomic nuclei, in contrast to probabilistic models used in conventional quantum mechanics.

In 1985, Moon developed the central conceptual framework of his geometric periodic table following discussions with collaborators.

In August 1986, the first written presentation of the model was completed. The model drew on geometric principles associated with Platonic solids and earlier ideas proposed by Johannes Kepler in Mysterium Cosmographicum (1596).

Moon continued developing this work in collaboration with associates including Laurence Hecht and Charles Stevens.

== Personal life ==
On August 22, 1931, Moon married Christine Monpleseurer in Springfield, Missouri. The couple had four children. On May 16, 1984, Christine Moon died.

== Legacy ==
Moon’s work spanned nuclear physics, reactor instrumentation, medical imaging, and theoretical models of atomic structure. His contributions to Manhattan Project research were conducted under classified conditions, and much of his work in this area was not widely publicized.

His postwar work in medical instrumentation contributed to developments in radiation measurement and imaging technologies. His later geometric model of atomic structure has been further explored by collaborators and independent researchers.
