= Jerzy Eisler =

Polish historian (born 1952)

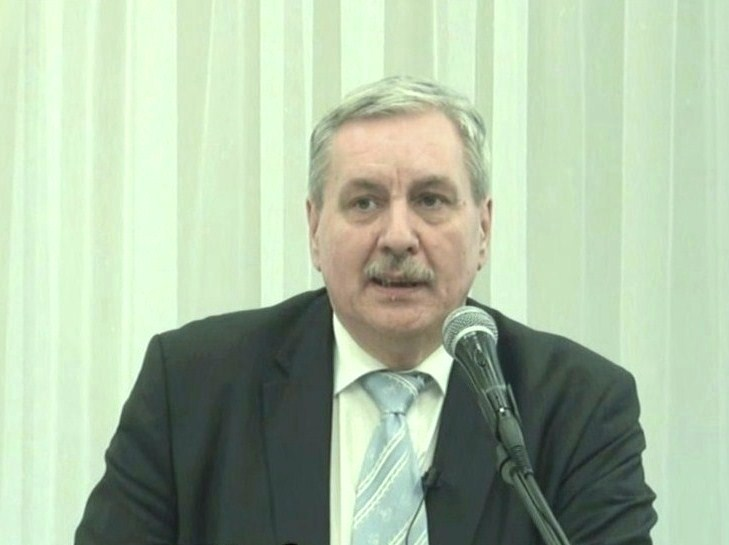
Jerzy Eisler

Jerzy Krzysztof Eisler (born 12 June 1952 in Warsaw) is a Polish historian, focusing mostly on the history of Poland during the communist era. He is a professor at the History Institute of the Polish Academy of Sciences, and member of the Institute of National Remembrance in Warsaw. In 1994-97 he was a principal of Adam Mickiewicz Polish school in Paris. Eisler gained a title of professor in 2002 and was awarded the Silver Cross of Merit medal in 2006.

== Works ==
In Communist Poland, Eisler primarily researched Vichy France to avoid censorship; however, during the 80s, as Solidarity gained mileage in Polish politics, he authored texts on contemporary history for circulation in the underground. In post-Communist Poland, his habilitation dissertation was on the 1968 Polish political crisis.

Works

- Od monarchizmu do faszyzmu. Koncepcje polityczno - społeczne prawicy francuskiej 1918 - 1940 (From Monarchism to Fascism. Sociopolitical Conceptions of the French Right 1918-1940) (1987)
- Kolaboracja we Francji 1940 - 1944 (Collaboration in France 1940-1944) (1989)
- Marzec 1968. Geneza - przebieg - konsekwencje (1991)
- Zarys dziejów politycznych Polski 1944 - 1989 (1992)
- List 34 (Letter 34) (1993)
- Grudzień 1970. Geneza - przebieg - konsekwencje (2000)
- Polski rok 1968 (Polish Year 1968) (2006)
- "Polskie miesiące" czyli kryzys(y) w PRL (2008)
