= Władysław Ludwik Anczyc =

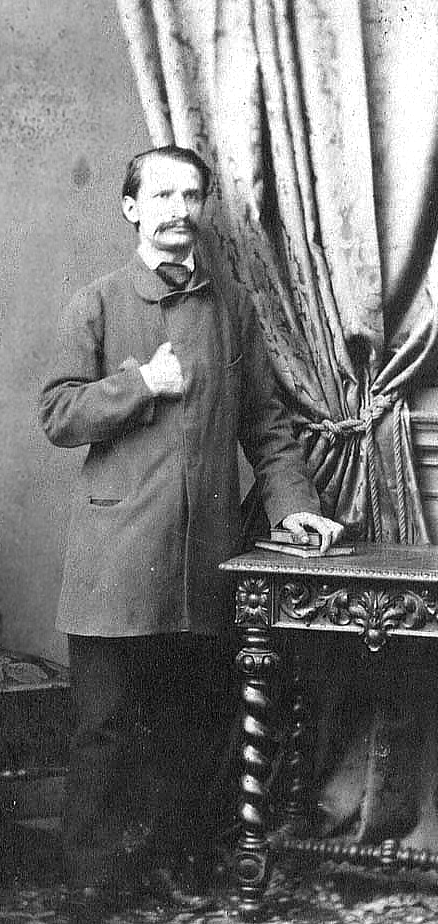
Władysław Ludwik Anczyc, 1860.

Władysław Ludwik Anczyc (12 December 1823, Vilnius – 28 July 1883) was a Polish poet, playwright, publisher, translator and folk activist from the Russian Empire.
