= Renata Maria Grzegorczykowa =

Polish philologist

- Born: Renata Maria Majewska; June 19, 1931 (age 95); Pruszków, Poland
- Education: University of Warsaw
- Spouse: Andrzej Grzegorczyk

Renata Maria Grzegorczykowa (born June 19, 1931) is a Polish philologist and an expert in polonist linguistics.

== Studies and career ==
During her career, professor Grzegorczykowa has published more than 200 scientific papers as well as several books.

Grzegorczykowa graduated from the University of Warsaw, where she was a student of professor Witold Doroszewski. She has been professionally involved with the University of Warsaw since 1956.

== Sources ==
- Tolstaya, Svatlana (2012). "Несколько слов по случаю юбилея проф. Ренаты Гжегорчиковой". O życiu zawodowym i dokonaniach naukowych profesor Renaty Grzegorczykowej (PDF) (in Russian). pp. 11–14.
- Mikołajczuk, Agnieszka (2012). O życiu zawodowym i dokonaniach naukowych profesor Renaty Grzegorczykowej (PDF) (in Polish). pp. 11–14.
