= Macron (physics) =

In physics, macrons are microscopic (dust-sized) particles, accelerated to high speeds. The term was first used in the late 1960s, when it was believed that macrons could be accelerated cheaply in small particle accelerators as a way of achieving low-cost fusion power.
