= Jacek Malinowski =

Polish logician

Jacek Malinowski (born May 20, 1959), is a Polish professor and mathematical logician, the editor-in-chief of Studia Logica, Head of the Department of Logic and Cognitive Science at the Polish Academy of Science, Warsaw, Poland, and Head of the Section of Logical Semiotics at Nicolaus Copernicus University in Torun, Poland.

From 2000 to 2001 Malinowski was a fellow of the Alexander von Humboldt Foundation at the Institute of Philosophy, Humboldt University in Berlin. From 2002 to 2003 he was at the Institute of Computer Science, University of Leipzig with a Marie Curie Fellowship. From 2004 to 2005 he was a fellow of the Netherlands Institute of Advanced Studies - NIAS.
