= Zbigniew Jaworowski =

Polish physician

Zbigniew Jaworowski (17 October 1927 – 12 November 2011) was a Polish physician, radiologist and alpinist. He chaired the United Nations Scientific Committee on the Effects of Atomic Radiation in 1981 and 1982. He was an investigator for projects by the U.S. Environmental Protection Agency and the International Atomic Energy Agency. Later in his career, Jaworowski disputed that ionizing radiation from the Chernobyl disaster was a major catastrophe for human health and wrote that the movement to remove lead from gasoline was based on a "stupid and fraudulent myth". Outside of his expertise in radiology, Jaworowski published articles criticizing mainstream climate science, including in magazines published by Lyndon LaRouche.

== Early life and education ==
Zbigniew Jaworowski was born on 17 October 1927. He graduated from the Medical Academy in Kraków with an MD in 1952. He earned his PhD in natural sciences in 1963 and his DSc in natural sciences in 1967.

== Career ==
Jaworowski was chairman of the Scientific Council of the Central Laboratory for Radiological Protection in Warsaw and former chair of the United Nations Scientific Committee on the Effects of Atomic Radiation (1981–82). He represented Poland in the UNSCEAR since the early 1970s. He was a principal investigator of three research projects of the U.S. Environmental Protection Agency and of four research projects of the International Atomic Energy Agency.

Jaworowski held posts with the Centre d'Etude Nucleaires near Paris; the Biophysical Group of the Institute of Physics, University of Oslo; the Norwegian Polar Research Institute and the National Institute of Polar Research in Tokyo.

=== Views on climate change ===
Jaworowski's works on ice cores were published in Jaworowski (1994, 1992) and in reports Jaworowski (1990, 1992). Jaworowski suggested that the long-term CO_{2} record is an artifact caused by the structural changes of the ice with depth and by postcoring processes.

Increases in CO_{2} and CH_{4} concentrations in the Vostok core are similar for the last two glacial-interglacial transitions, even though only the most recent transition is located in the brittle zone. Such evidence argues that the atmospheric trace-gas signal is not strongly affected by the presence of the brittle zone. Similarly Hans Oeschger states that "...Some of (Jaworowski's) statements are drastically wrong from the physical point of view".

Stephen Schneider said of him that "Jaworowski is perhaps even more contrarian than most, claiming that he can prove the climate is going to get colder through his work excavating glaciers on six different continents, which he says indicates what we should really be worrying about is 'The approaching new Ice Age...'." Jaworowski wrote "The current sunspot cycle is weaker than the preceding cycles, and the next two cycles will be even weaker. Bashkirtsev and Mishnich (2003) expect that the minimum of the secular cycle of solar activity will occur between 2021 and 2026, which will result in the minimum global temperature of the surface air. The shift from warm to cool climate might have already started."

When approached to see if he would bet on future cooling, Jaworowski denied making any prediction, stating "I do not make my own detailed projections. In my paper I referred the reader to B&M paper, and that is all."

Jaworowski published several papers in 21st Century Science and Technology, a non-refereed magazine published by Lyndon LaRouche.

=== Other views ===
Jaworowski wrote that the movement to remove lead from gasoline was based on a "stupid and fraudulent myth," and that lead levels in the human bloodstream are not significantly affected by the use of leaded gasoline.

Jaworowski disputed that ionizing radiation from the Chernobyl disaster was a major catastrophe for human health. After Ukrainian environment minister Yuriy Shcherbak published an article in Scientific American raising concerns about the long-term effects on children in high-radiation areas, Jaworowski pushed back, arguing that increased rates of thyroid cancer could have had other causes and questioning why rates of other types of cancer had not increased. In 1999, he argued that radiation exposure from fallout was "grossly exaggerated". He received criticism from his peers for this perspective in Physics Today and defended his position in 2000. In an interview with the BBC, he referred to the concept of a nuclear winter destroying the biosphere following a nuclear war as "old mythology". Jaworowski also rejected the linear no-threshold model (LNT) for what he considered its poor scientific basis and the "dubious moral aspect of its applications". He argued for dropping LNT from radiation protection regulations and thought that radiophobia was the result of decades of anti-nuclear and anti-radiation propaganda.

== Primary published articles ==
- Jaworowski, Z., 1968, Stable lead in fossil ice and bones, Nature, 217, 152-153.
- Jaworowski, Z., M Bysiek, L Kownacka, 1981, Flow of metals into the global atmosphere, Geochimica et Cosmochimica Acta, vol. 45, Issue 11, pp. 2185–2199. abstract
- Jaworowski, Z., T.V. Segalstad, and N. Ono, 1992, Do glaciers tell a true atmospheric CO_{2} story?, The Science of the Total Environment, 114, p. 227-284.
- Jaworowski, Z., 1994, Ancient atmosphere - validity of ice records, Environmental Science and Pollution Research, 1(3): p. 161-171.
- Jaworowski, Z., Hoff, P., Hagen, J.O., et al., 1997, A highly radioactive Chernobyl deposit in a Scandinavian glacier, Journal of Environmental Radioactivity, 35 (1), 91-108.
- Jaworowski, Z., 1999, Radiation Risk and Ethics, Physics Today, 52(9), September 1999, pp. 24–29. link

== Other publications ==
- Jaworowski, Z., Segalstad, T.V. and Hisdal, V., 1990. Atmospheric CO_{2} and global warming: a critical review., Rapportserie 59, p. 76, Norsk Polarinstitutt, Oslo.
- Jaworowski, Z., Segalstad, T.V. and Hisdal, V., 1992a, Atmospheric CO_{2} and global warming: A critical review., Second revised edition, Meddelelser 119, Norsk Polarinstitutt, Oslo, p. 76.
- Jaworowski, Z., 1994, The Posthumous Papers of Leaded Gasoline., 21st century Science and Technology, 7, No. 1, pp. 34–41
- Jaworowski, Z., 1996, Reliability of Ice Core Records for Climatic Projections, In The Global Warming Debate (London: European Science and Environment Forum), p. 95.
- Jaworowski, Z., 1997, Another global warming fraud exposed. Ice core data show no carbon dioxide increase, 21st Century Science and Technology, pdf
- Jaworowski, Z. 1999, The Global Warming Folly, 21st Century Science and Technology, 7 (1), 31-41
- Jaworowski, Z., 1999, Radiation Risk and Ethics, Physics Today, 52(9). article on-line
- Jaworowski, Z., 2002, The Future of UNSCEAR, Science, 297 (19), p. 335 (letter)
- Jaworowski, Z., Winter 2003-2004, Solar cycles, not CO_{2}, determine climate, 21st Century Science and Technology, pdf
- Jaworowski, Z., 2007, CO_{2}: The greatest scientific scandal of our time, EIR Science, pdf

== See also ==
- The Great Global Warming Swindle - some of Jaworowski's arguments (astronomical causes, water vapor effect) are similar to the one in the movie.
