= Ludwik Hass =

Polish historian (1918–2008)

Professor Ludwik Hass
- Born: November 18, 1918; Stanyslaviv, West Ukrainian People's Republic
- Died: April 8, 2008 (aged 89); Warsaw, Poland

Academic background
- Education: Uniwersytet Jana Kazimierza; Polish Academy of Sciences
- Thesis: Wybory warszawskie 1918–1926 (1971)
- Doctoral advisor: Henryk Jabłoński

Academic work
- Discipline: History
- Institutions: Institute for the History of Science of the Polish Academy of Sciences
- Main interests: History of Freemasonry
- Notable works: Sekta farmazonii warszawskiej

Ludwik Hass (1918–2008) was a Polish historian who specialised in the history of Freemasonry in Poland.

== Biography ==
=== Early life ===
Hass was born to Polish-Jewish parents in Stanyslaviv. He was brought up in a middle-class family which had been assimilated to Polish nationalism. Hass first came into contact with communist ideas at the Humanities Gymnasium he attended in Stanisławowo, through his association with the left wing of the Związek Polskiej Młodzieży Demokratycznej. Whilst studying at the Uniwersytet Jana Kazimierza, he became a member of the Union of Independent Socialist Youth, a Marxist, anti-nationalist group that opposed antisemitism. By this stage Hass had become critical of Stalinism and gained a reputation within the Union as a Trotskyist, without having any knowledge of what that meant. The exaggerated tirades against Trotskyism performed by Union leader Adam Schaff merely served to pique Hass’s interest. He then joined an anti-Stalinist group, becoming exposed to critical ideas through Leon Trotsky's dissident publication Byulletin’ Oppozitsii and the Belgian paper Lutte Ouvrière.

=== Arrest ===
Following the German-Soviet invasion of Poland in 1939 he found himself in the territory of the Soviet Union. He was arrested and sent to Vorkutlag. He attributed his survival due to being assigned office work thanks to his education. He was released in 1948 and remained in the Soviet Union until he returned to Poland in 1957. On his arrival in Warsaw he astounded a welcoming delegation of students, by announcing that he was a revolutionary who wanted to overthrow the bureaucracy. He then sang The Internationale and gave a clenched fist salute.

== Texts by Hass ==
- "The Russian Masonic Movement in the Years 1906 - 1918", (1983) Acta Poloniae Historica 48, ISSN 0001-6829
