= Mala Berezovytsia =

Rural locality in Ternopil Oblast, Ukraine

- Village
- Location in Ukraine
- Coordinates: 49°45′19″N 25°33′51″E
- Country: Ukraine
- Oblast: Ternopil Oblast
- Raion: Ternopil Raion

Mala Berezovytsia (Ukrainian: Мала Березовиця; Polish: Berezowica Mała) is a village in Ternopil Raion, Ternopil Oblast, western Ukraine. It belongs to Zbarazh urban hromada, one of the hromadas of Ukraine. Mala Berezovytsia has a current population of 230 people.

It is the birthplace of Taras Levkiv, a Ukrainian artist specializing in Ceramic art. It is also the birthplace of Mieczysław Albert Krąpiec, Polish professor, philosopher, theologian and longtime rector of the Catholic University of Lublin.

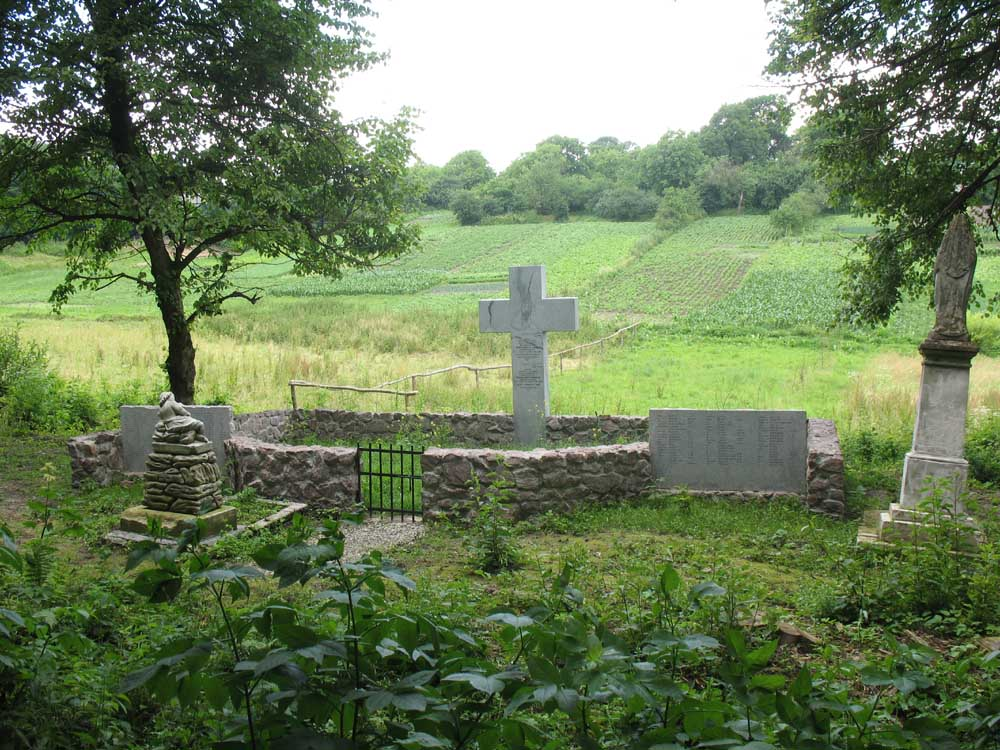
Cemetery in Mala Berezovytsia commemorating the victims of the UPA massacre in 1944

Mala Berezovytsia was the site of the massacre of Poles perpetrated by the Ukrainian Insurgent Army on February 22 and 23, 1944.

Until 18 July 2020, Mala Berezovytsia belonged to Zbarazh Raion. The raion was abolished in July 2020 as part of the administrative reform of Ukraine, which reduced the number of raions of Ternopil Oblast to three. The area of Zbarazh Raion was split between Kremenets and Ternopil Raions, with Mala Berezovytsia being transferred to Ternopil Raion.
