= Studia Logica =

- Cover of a Studia Logica Journal
- Discipline: Logic, philosophy, and mathematics
- Language: English

Publication details
- History: 1953-present
- Publisher: Institute of Philosophy and Sociology of the Polish Academy of Sciences, and Springer
- Impact factor: 0.724 (2015)

Standard abbreviations
- ISO 4: Stud. Log.
- MathSciNet: Studia Logica

Indexing
- ISSN: 0039-3215 (print); 1572-8730 (web)

Links
- Journal homepage; Studia Logica – Springer

Studia Logica (full name: Studia Logica, An International Journal for Symbolic Logic) is a scientific journal publishing papers employing formal tools from Mathematics and Logic. The scope of papers published in Studia Logica covers all scientific disciplines; the key criterion for published papers is not their topic but their method: they are required to contain significant and original results concerning formal systems and their properties. The journal offers papers on topics in general logic and on applications of logic to methodology of science, linguistics, philosophy, and other branches of knowledge. The journal is published by the Institute of Philosophy and Sociology of the Polish Academy of Sciences and Springer publications.

== History ==
The name Studia Logica appeared for the first time in 1934, but only one volume (edited by Jan Łukasiewicz) has been published that time. It had been published continuously since December 1953 in changing frequency by the Polish Academy of Sciences. Articles used to appear in Polish, Russian, German, English or French, and their summaries or full translations in at least two of the languages. Kazimierz Ajdukiewicz was chief editor until his death in 1963. The position was later taken by Jerzy Słupecki (1963-1970), Klemens Szaniawski (1970-1974). Under the editorship of Ryszard Wójcicki (1975-1980), who later headed the journal as chairman of the editorial board, Studia Logica moved to publish in English only, and partnered with a Dutch international distributor. Jacek Malinowski runs Studia Logica as Editor-in-Chief from 2006.

== Conferences ==
In 2003, to celebrate the 50 years of Studia Logica, two conferences were organized: in Warsaw/Mądralin (Poland) and in Roskilde (Denmark). They started a series of scientific conferences in collaboration with Studia Logica under the name "Trends in Logic". More than 20 Trends in Logic conferences have been organized, in different countries in Europe, Asia and South America. Full list of Trends in Logic conferences can be found at http://studialogica.org/past.events.html

== Bookseries Studia Logica Library ==
Studia Logica Library was founded by Ryszard Wójcicki. First book in the series, The Is-Ought Problem by Gerhard Schurz, was published in 1997. Originally, these volumes were published by Kluwer Academic Publishers, and starting in September 2005 (on Trends in Logic volume 24), they began publishing with Springer.

- Currently Studia Logica Library consist of three subseries:
1. Trends in Logic run by Heinrich Wansing
2. Outstanding contributions run by Sven Ove Hansson
3. Logic in Asia run by Fenrong Liu and Hiroakira Ono.
