= Aleksander Albert Krajewski =

Polish publicist and translator

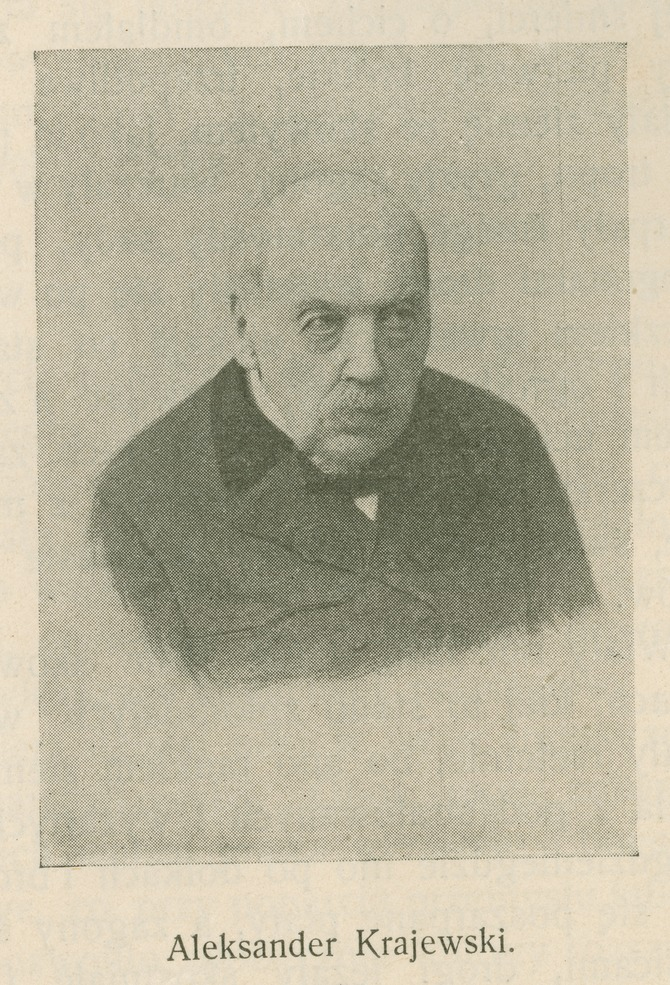

Aleksander Albert Krajewski (28 February 1818 or 1819-4 January 1903) was a Polish publicist and translator. For activity in Polish nationalist organizations sentenced to katorga by Russian Empire in 1838; returned after the amnesty of 1858. His translations include Goethe's Faust, works of Roman poet Horace and British poet George Gordon Byron.
