= Siberian Mathematical Journal =

The Siberian Mathematical Journal (abbreviated as Sib. Math. J.) is a cover-to-cover English translation of the Russian peer-reviewed mathematics journal Sibirskii Matematicheskii Zhurnal, a publication of the Sobolev Institute of Mathematics of the Siberian Division of the Russian Academy of Sciences (Novosibirsk). Sibirskii Matematicheskii Zhurnal was established in 1960 and the Siberian Mathematical Journal was launched in 1966. It is published by Springer Science+Business Media.

The journal publishes research papers in all branches of mathematics, including functional analysis, differential equations, algebra and logic, geometry and topology, probability theory and mathematical statistics, ill-posed problems of mathematical physics, computational methods of linear algebra, etc.

The journal is indexed in Russian Science Citation Index.
