= Franz Guenthner =

German linguist

Franz Guenthner is a German linguist who is a professor of Computational Linguistics at the Center for Information and Language Processing (CIS) at LMU Munich in Germany. His background is in philosophy and linguistics.

Guenthner's research interests include computational linguistics, and has collaborated to the development of a number of online search platforms since 1996, including AltaVista, Fast Search and Transfer (now purchased by Microsoft), and JobaNova. He was a professor of General and Computational Linguistics at the University of Tübingen (1977–1989) before joining LMU Munich in 1990. His research interests include all areas of text processing and in particular the transformation of textual corpora in lexical and grammatical representations (i.e. computationally deployable electronic dictionaries and local grammars). He was also instrumental in the design and realization of a number of search engines, in particular of the first large-scale scientific search engine on the web www.scirus.com. Later work concerned the use of linguistic techniques in page and link analysis on the web, especially for the construction of vertical search engines.

== See also ==
- Defeasible reasoning
