= 1971 Women's World Cup squads =

Football tournament squads

The following lists the squads for the 1971 Women's World Cup arranged by FIEFF, held in Mexico in August and September 1971. Six teams qualified for the tournament, with hosts Mexico qualifying automatically.

== Argentina ==
16 players represented Argentina. The team is known as Las Pioneras (the pioneers) and in 2019, an official Dia de la Futbolista Argentina (national women's football day) to celebrate women's football was enacted.

Head coach: Miguel Bautista Cúparo

No.	Pos.	Player	Date of birth (age)	Caps	Goals	Club
	GK	Marta Soler	22 April 1953 (aged 18)			(Argentine Football Association) Universitario
	GK	María Fiorelli				(Argentine Football Association) Universitario
3	DF	Ofelia Feito				(Argentine Football Association) Universitario
4	DF	Teresa Suárez				Real Italiano
	DF	Virginia Andrada				(Argentine Football Association) Universitario
	DF	Zulma Gómez				Real Italiano
	MF	Susana Lopreito				
6	MF	Angélica Cardozo (captain)				(Argentine Football Association) Universitario
9	FW	Betty García	11 August 1941 (aged 30)			(Argentine Football Association) Universitario
10	MF	Elba Selva	14 January 1945 (aged 26)			Real Italiano
11	FW	María Esther Ponce	1 June 1945 (aged 26)			(Portuguese Football Federation) Sporting
	FW	Virginia Cataneo				(Argentine Football Association) Universitario
		Zunilda Troncoso				(Argentine Football Association) Universitario
		Eva Lembesis				(Argentine Football Association) Universitario
		Blanca Bruccoli				(Argentine Football Association) Universitario
		María Cáseres				

== Denmark ==
16 players represented Denmark. In 2019, this winning team were inducted into the Danish Football Hall of Fame.

Head coach: Jørgen Andreasen

No.	Pos.	Player	Date of birth (age)	Caps	Goals	Club
	GK	Birte Kjems	9 April 1949 (aged 22)			(Danish Football Association) Ribe Boldklub
	GK	Lena Schelke Larsen	0 December 1947 (aged 23–24)			(Danish Football Association) Sundby Boldklub
	DF	Ann Andreasen	27 July 1955 (aged 16)			(Danish Football Association) BK Stjernen
	DF	Annette Frederiksen	10 December 1954 (aged 16)			(Danish Football Association) Ribe Boldklub
	DF	Ingrid Hansen	28 February 1955 (aged 16)			(Danish Football Association) Herrested BK
	DF	Solveig Hansen	0 December 1946 (aged 24–25)			(Danish Football Association) Rødovre Boldklub
	DF	Mona Jensen	0 December 1951 (aged 19–20)			(Danish Football Association) AIA Aarhus
	DF	Lis Westberg Pedersen (captain)	0 December 1946 (aged 24–25)			(Danish Football Association) Boldklubben Orient
	MF	Inger Tulle Pedersen	8 March 1950 (aged 21)			(Danish Football Association) Virum-Sorgenfri Boldklub
	MF	Asta Vig	22 May 1949 (aged 22)			(Danish Football Association) Billum IF
	FW	Susanne Augustesen	10 May 1956 (aged 15)			(Danish Football Association) Holbæk B&I
	FW	Helene Østergaard Hansen	0 December 1941 (aged 29–30)			(Danish Football Association) Boldklubben Femina
	FW	Marianne Kamp	0 December 1955 (aged 15–16)			(Danish Football Association) Skovlunde IF
	FW	Bente Jensen	9 November 1951 (aged 19)			(Danish Football Association) BK Stjernen
	FW	Lis Lene Nielsen	29 August 1951 (aged 19)			(Danish Football Association) Skamby Boldklub
		Lone Nielsen	0 December 1948 (aged 22–23)			(Danish Football Association) Hvidovre IF

== England ==
14 players represented England. The team has been dubbed the "Lost Lionesses" by the media.

Head coach: Harry Batt

No.	Pos.	Player	Date of birth (age)	Caps	Goals	Club
	GK	Lillian Harris				
	DF	Carol Wilson (captain)	June 1952 (aged 19)			
	DF	Jean Breckon				
	DF	Yvonne Farr				
	MF	Marlene Collins				
	MF	Chris Lockwood	17 April 1956 (aged 15)			(The Football Association) Chiltern Valley
	MF	Trudy McCaffrey				
	FW	Janice Barton				(The Football Association) Chiltern Valley
	FW	Leah Caleb	April 1958 (aged 13)			(The Football Association) Chiltern Valley
	FW	Louise Cross				
	FW	Paula Rayner				
	FW	Gill Sayell	26 October 1956 (aged 14)			(The Football Association) Thame LFC
		Jill Stockley				
		Valerie Cheshire				

== France ==
17 players represented France.

Head coach: Pierre Geoffroy

No.	Pos.	Player	Date of birth (age)	Caps	Goals	Club
	MF	Armelle Binard	9 January 1953 (aged 18)			(French Football Federation) FC Rouen
	GK	Marie-Louise Butzig	15 November 1944 (aged 26)			(French Football Federation) Vrigne-aux-Bois
		Claudine Die				
		Betty Goret				
	DF	Colette Guyard	24 October 1952 (aged 18)			(French Football Federation) Stade de Reims
	FW	Jocelyne Henry	9 April 1954 (aged 17)			(French Football Federation) Stade de Reims
		Monique Hilaire				
	DF	Maryse Lesieur	27 February 1950 (aged 21)			(French Football Federation) Stade de Reims
		Nicole Mangas				
		Aline Meyer				
	MF	Michèle Monier	16 July 1946 (aged 25)			(French Football Federation) Stade de Reims
		Régine Pourveux				
	FW	Jocelyne Ratignier	4 July 1954 (aged 17)			(French Football Federation) Stade de Reims
	GK	Ghislaine Royer	15 January 1953 (aged 18)			(French Football Federation) Stade de Reims
	DF	Chantal Serre	28 August 1950 (aged 20)			(French Football Federation) Stade de Reims
	DF	Marie-Bernadette Thomas	13 December 1955 (aged 15)			(French Football Federation) Stade de Reims
	MF	Marie-Christine Tschopp (captain)	25 January 1951 (aged 20)			(French Football Federation)

== Italy ==
17 players represented Italy.

Head coach: Giuseppe Cavicchi

No.	Pos.	Player	Date of birth (age)	Caps	Goals	Club
	GK	Derna Isolini				(Italian Football Federation) Real Torino
	GK	Wilma Seghetti	7 May 1956 (aged 15)			(Italian Football Federation) Olimpia Verona
	GK	Daniela Sogliani	20 January 1954 (aged 17)			(Italian Football Federation) Saronno
	DF	Claudia Avon				(Italian Football Federation) Real Torino
	DF	Maria Castelli				(Italian Football Federation) Real Torino
	DF	Maria Fabris				(Italian Football Federation) Ambrosiana 1968
	DF	Anna Stopar				(Italian Football Federation) Real Juventus
	MF	Paola Cardia	25 June 1952 (aged 19)			(Italian Football Federation) Real Torino
	MF	Manola Conter				(Italian Football Federation) Ambrosiana 1968
	MF	Rosetta Cunzolo				(Italian Football Federation) Real Juventus
	MF	Manuela Pinardi				(Italian Football Federation) Vernici Milesi Parma
	MF	Elena Schiavo (captain)	14 January 1948 (aged 23)			(Italian Football Federation) Falchi Astro
	FW	Maurizia Ciceri	26 September 1953 (aged 17)			(Italian Football Federation) Real Torino
	FW	Aurora Giubertoni				(Italian Football Federation) Ambrosiana 1968
	FW	Liliana Mammina	3 January 1958 (aged 13)			(Italian Football Federation) Montuori Palermo
	FW	Carmela Varone				(Italian Football Federation) Real Juventus
	FW	Elisabetta Vignotto	13 January 1954 (aged 17)			(Italian Football Federation) Real Juventus

== Mexico ==
18 players represented Mexico.

Head coach: Víctor Manuel Meléndez

No.	Pos.	Player	Date of birth (age)	Caps	Goals	Club
	GK	Yolanda Ramírez				
	GK	Elvira Aracén				
	DF	Irma Chávez				
	DF	Martha Coronado				
	DF	Bertha Orduña				
	DF	Paula Pérez				
	DF	Guadalupe Tovar (captain)				
	MF	Elsa Huerta				
	MF	Alicia Vargas	2 February 1954 (aged 17)			
	MF	Patricia Hernández				
	FW	Lourdes de la Rosa				
	FW	Sandra Tapia				
	FW	María Eugenia Rubio				
	FW	María Hernández				
	FW	Teresa Aguilar				
	FW	Silvia Zaragoza				
	FW	Eréndira Rangel				
		Cecilia Gallegos				
