= England women's national football team results (unofficial matches) =

- Win Draw Loss

This is a list of results of unofficial football played by the England women's national football team, including both unsanctioned teams and behind-closed-doors matches, as well as other results not fully recognised by FIFA and/or the FA for various reasons.

As of 2024, there are 20 known unofficial results for the team: 6 wins, 2 draws, 10 losses, and 2 unqualified results.

== Results ==
=== 1969 ===
| 1 November 1969 1969 European Competition for Women's Football semi-final | Denmark | 4–3 | England | Aosta, Italy |
| | Ir. Christensen 13', 44'; Ševčíková 15'; L. Hansen 28' | Report | Lopez 8', 53', 61' | Stadium: Stadio Mario Puchoz; Attendance: 2,500; Referee: Turco (Italy) |

| 2 November 1969 1969 European Competition for Women's Football third place | England | 2–0 | France | Turin, Italy |
| | Tungate 12'; Lopez 46' | Report | | Stadium: Stadio Comunale; Referee: Sicco (Italy) |

=== 1970 ===
| 6/7 July 1970 1970 Women's World Cup quarter-final | England | 5–1 | West Germany | Genoa, Italy |
| | Briggs 1', 9'; Stockley 25' (pen.); Cross 36'; Dolling 61' | | Schmitz 49' | Stadium: Stadio Luigi Ferraris; Attendance: 3,000; Referee: Loffi (Italy) |

| 10 July 1970 1970 Women's World Cup semi-final | Denmark | 2–0 | England | Milan, Italy |
| | Evers 46', 70' | | | Stadium: San Siro; Attendance: 7,000; Referee: Francesco Lojacono (Italy) |

| 13 July 1970 1970 Women's World Cup third place | Mexico | 3–2 | England | Turin, Italy |
| | Vargas 3'; Hernández 9'; Tovar 15' | | Davies 24'; Stockley 55' (pen.) | Stadium: Stadio Comunale; Attendance: 3,000; Referee: Sicco (Italy) |

=== 1971 ===
| 2 June 1971 1971 Women's World Cup qualifying | Italy | 7–1 | England | Erice, Italy |
| | Avon; Ciceri; Vignotto | | | Stadium: Stadio Provinciale; Attendance: 10,000; Referee: Francesco Lojacono (Italy) |

| 4 June 1971 1971 Women's World Cup qualifying | England | 3–0 | Austria | Catania, Italy |
| | Barton; Rayner | | | Stadium: Stadio Cibali; Attendance: 2,000; Referee: Giovanni Mosca (Italy) |

| 21 August 1971 1971 Women's World Cup group stage | Argentina | 4–1 | England | Mexico City, Mexico |
| | Selva 7', 31', 34' (pen.), 71' | Report | Barton 13' (red card) 54' | Stadium: Estadio Azteca; Attendance: 25,000; Referee: Cosentina (Italy) or José López Torres (Mexico) |

| 22 August 1971 1971 Women's World Cup group stage | Mexico | 4–0 | England | Mexico City, Mexico |
| | Rangel 12'; Aguilar 23', 43'; Huerta 49' | | | Stadium: Estadio Azteca; Attendance: 90,000; Referee: Stèphane Frère (France) |

| 28 August 1971 1971 Women's World Cup fifth place | England | 2–3 | France | Mexico City, Mexico |
| | Barton 10', 16' | | Binard 12'; Henry 22'; Royer 32' | Stadium: Estadio Azteca; Attendance: 25,000; Referee: Grecia del Ángel (Mexico) |

=== 1972 ===
| 5 August 1972 Friendly | Italy | 2–0 | England | Livorno, Italy |
| | Stopar; Goso | | | Attendance: 25,000; Referee: Cosentina (Italy) |

=== 1988 ===
| 17 April 1988 Friendly | England | 2–0 | Republic of Ireland | London |
| | Coultard (pen.); Spacey | | | Stadium: Wembley Stadium; Attendance: 17,000 |

| 20 July 1988 1988 Mundialito group stage | Italy B | 0–3 | England | Riva del Garda, Italy |
| | | | Sempare; Walker; Curl | Stadium: Campo Sportivo Benecense |
Note: After Switzerland withdrew, hosts Italy fielded a B team to play the scheduled game against England, which did not contribute to group standings.

=== 1990 ===
| 12 May 1990 Friendly | England | 4–0 | Scotland | London |
| | Sherrard; Spacey; (o.g.) | | | Stadium: Wembley Stadium; Attendance: 80,000 |
Note: Despite only having 20-minute halves, played ahead of the men's FA Cup final, the match is considered a full international by the England FA.

=== 2007 ===
| 25 August 2007 Friendly | China | 1–0 | England | Macau |
| | | Report | | Stadium: Macau Olympic Stadium |

=== 2011 ===
| 23 June 2011 Friendly | Australia | 2–0 | England | Wolfsburg, Germany |
| | McCallum 15' (pen.), 28' | Report | | Stadium: Volkswagen Arena; Referee: Riem Hussein (Germany) |
Note: Behind-closed-doors

=== 2020 ===
During the COVID-19 pandemic, England struggled to organise international matches and travel for organised friendlies. Instead, during the international breaks, they played fully FIFA regulation matches with two sides each composed of senior England players.

| 18 September 2020 | White XI | 3–0 | Houghton XI | Burton-upon-Trent |
| 18:00 GMT | White 18', 30'; Toone 50' | Report | | Stadium: St George's Park; Attendance: 0 |

| 3 December 2020 | Houghton XI | 1–3 | Bronze XI | Burton-upon-Trent |
| | Walsh | Report | Parris (pen.); Duggan; Toone | Stadium: St George's Park; Attendance: 0 |

=== 2023 ===
| 14 July 2023 Unofficial friendly | England XI | 0–0 | Canada XI | Sunshine Coast, Australia |
| | | | | Stadium: Sunshine Coast Stadium; Attendance: 0 |
Note: Behind-closed-doors training match (rolling substitutions and no caps)

=== 2024 ===
| 4 July 2024 Unofficial friendly | England XI | 1–1 | Netherlands XI | Zeist, Netherlands |
| | Beever-Jones | | Ripa | Stadium: KNVB Campus; Attendance: 0 |
Note: Uncapped friendly with rolling substitutions.

== See also ==
- Lost Lionesses

== Sources ==
- "Match Results England Women". England Football Online. Archived from the original on 26 January 2025.
