= 1958 in association football =

The following are the football (soccer) events of the year 1958 throughout the world.

== Events ==
- February 6 – Munich air disaster: Following a European Cup quarter-final tie in Belgrade against Red Star Belgrade, Matt Busby's Manchester United stop over in Munich for refueling. Two attempts to take off from the Munich-Riem airport are aborted, with a third attempted at 3:04pm on Flight BE609, a British European Airways "Elizabethan" class Airspeed Ambassador charter aircraft G-ALZU 'Lord Burghley'. On take off, the aeroplane, carrying players and backroom staff of Manchester United F.C., plus a number of British journalists and supporters, crashed in a blizzard. Twenty-three of the 43 passengers on board the aircraft died in the disaster, including eight Manchester United players, of whom seven died instantly, including the team's captain Roger Byrne. Centre-half Duncan Edwards succumbed to his injuries three weeks later. Two other players were forced to retire from professional football as a result of their injuries. Manager Busby was left fighting for his life, and was given the last rites twice, before eventually returning to Manchester in time for the start of the following season.
- October 1 – Dutch club VV DOS from Utrecht makes its European debut by losing to Portugal's Sporting Lisboa (3–4) in the first round of the European Cup.

== Winners club national championship ==
- Argentina: Racing Club
- England: Wolverhampton Wanderers
- France: Stade de Reims
- Israel: Maccabi Tel Aviv
- Italy: Juventus FC
- Mexico: Zacatepec
- Netherlands: DOS
- Paraguay: Olimpia Asunción
- Poland: ŁKS Łódź
- Scotland: Hearts
- Soviet Union: FC Spartak Moscow
- Spain: Real Madrid
- West Germany: FC Schalke 04

== International tournaments ==
- 1958 British Home Championship (October 19, 1957 – April 19, 1958)

Shared by England and Northern Ireland

- FIFA World Cup in Sweden (June 8 – 29 1958)
  1. Brazil
  2. Sweden
  3. France

== Births ==
- January 3 – Liliana Mammina
- February 1 – Luther Blissett, English international footballer and manager
- February 22 – Paolo Borelli, Italian former professional footballer
- April 9 – Victor Diogo, Uruguayan international footballer
- April 11 – Wout Holverda, Dutch footballer (died 2021)
- April 29 – Sergey Goryunov, Russian football coach and former Soviet player
- May 12 – José María Rivas, Salvadorian international footballer (died 2016)
- June 29 – Ralf Rangnick, German professional football coach, executive, and former player
- July 4 – Carl Valentine, Canadian international soccer player and manager
- July 12 – Duncan Cole, New Zealand international footballer (died 2014)
- July 14 – José Luis Russo, Uruguayan international footballer
- July 15 – Austin Hayes, Irish footballer (died 1986)
- August 12 – Héctor Zelaya, Honduran international footballer
- September 3 – José Carlos Chaves, Costa Rican footballer
- September 29 – Ron Jans, Dutch footballer and manager
- October 11 – Peter van Velzen, Dutch footballer and manager
- October 15 – Carlo Jungbluth, retired Luxembourgian footballer

== Deaths ==
- February 21 – Duncan Edwards - Manchester United player.
- November 28 – Karl Flink; German international footballer (born 1895)
