= Women's football in Argentina =

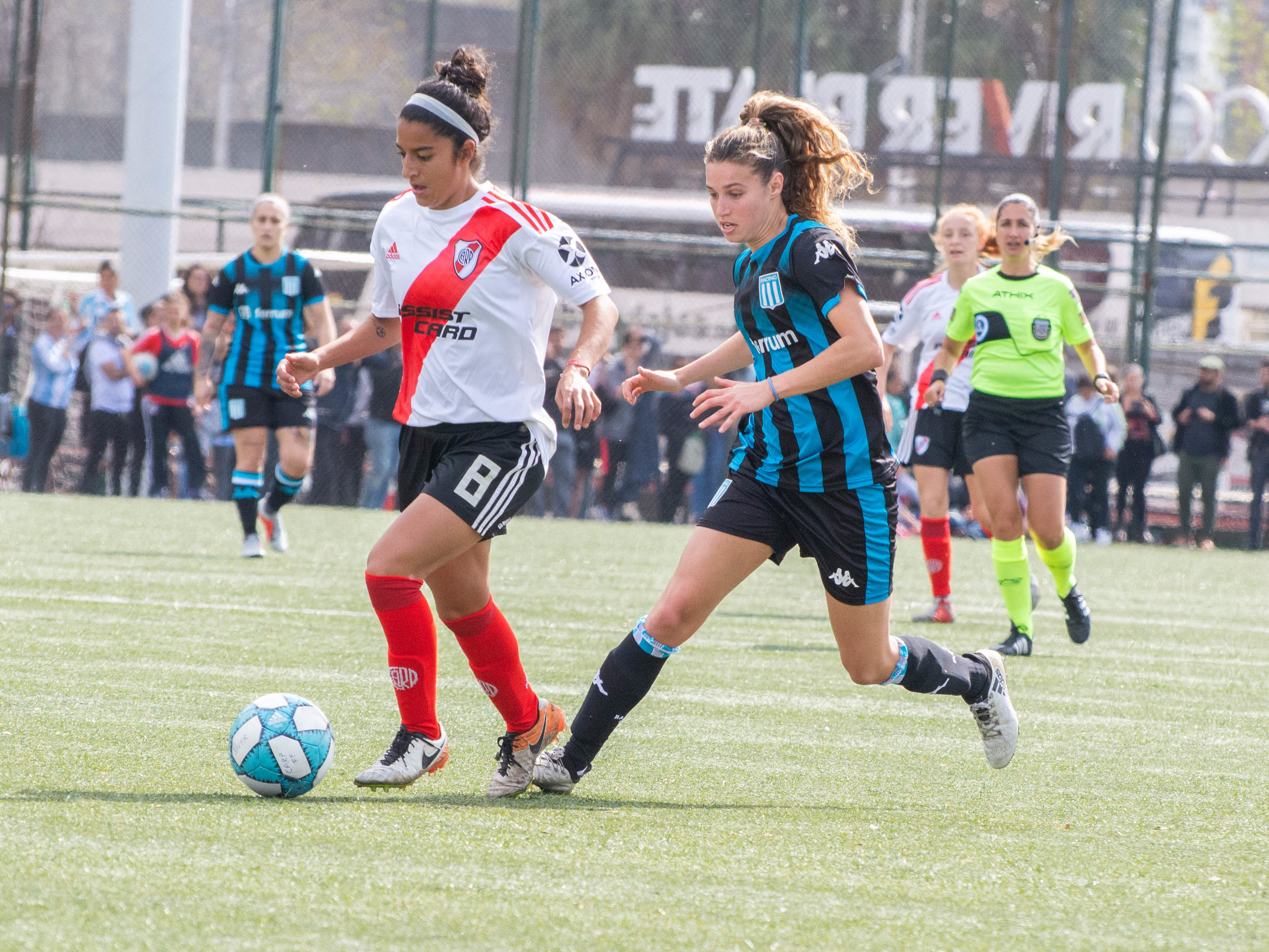
- River Plate v Racing Club match in 2019
- Country: Argentina
- Governing body: AFA
- National team: Women's national team
- First played: 1923; 103 years ago

Club competitions
- Primera División A; Primera División B; Primera División C

International competitions
- Olympics; FIFA Women's World Cup; Copa América Femenina

Women's football in Argentina has struggled to find a mainstream audience. While women's football clubs have existed in Argentina for decades, only in 1991 a group of clubs was allowed into the AFA (Argentina Football Association). Initially seven teams, the country saw the number of clubs with female teams rising to 35 in 1998, and then steadily plummet due to lack of interest.

Many women face prejudice and stigma for playing the game.

The first recorded women's football match in Argentina was played on 13 October 1923 at Estadio Ministro Brin y Senguel, then Boca Juniors' stadium. Teams were named Argentinas and Cosmopolitas and 6,000 spectators attended. Argentinas won 4–3 Chronicles of the match were published by newspapers La Vanguardia and Crítica.

Despite those first attempts, women's football in Argentina would not be recognized until the 1990s.

Evelina Cabrera founded the "Asociación Femenina de Fútbol Argentino" (AFFAR) (Argentinian Women's Football Association) in 2013.

== History ==
=== Cultural biases ===
Cultural prejudices against football as a women's activity are not unique to the country and have been present practically since the sport began. During the Victorian era, when the organization of modern football began in England, the only sporting activities that were considered appropriate for women were those that could be practiced in a skirt and corset, and if possible in private settings. Thus, female participation achieved a better acceptance in sports such as tennis, golf, cricket or hockey, but in the case of football, which already attracted great public attention at that time and also required a wide freedom of movement and freedom of movement. especially on the legs, there wasn't much room for tolerance. Women's football was involved in controversial issues of the time such as the reform of clothing, sexuality, the concept of women and feminine freedoms.

Another common argument to disqualify women's football was the possible risks that the practice of this sport could have for the reproductive capacity of women, all this within the framework of a culture that awarded them motherhood as the fulfillment of their lives. With the same argument, it was that women's football was banned in 1921 in England and in 1940 in Brazil.

=== First records ===
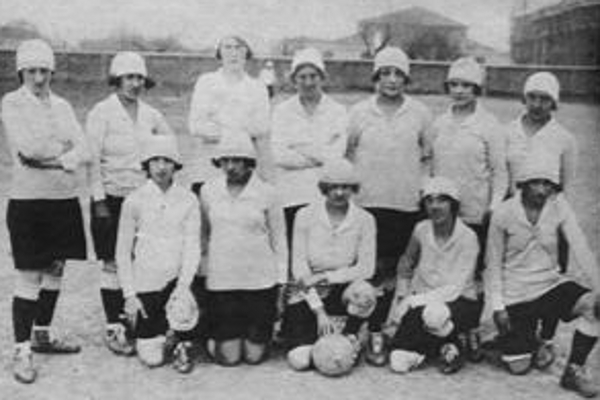
Some members of Río de la Plata, the first female football team of Argentina, pictured in Buenos Aires in 1923

The first female football match played in Argentina of which there is a record occurred on 13 October 1923 in the Boca Juniors Stadium between two teams called "Argentinas" and "Cosmopolitas". Approximately 6,000 people attended the meeting. The newspapers La Vanguardia and Crítica published news about the event. In addition, the American historians Brenda Elsey and Joshua Nadel found an article in the Fray Mocho magazine with photographs of women's teams identified as members of the first club of women's football, called Río de la Plata , in Buenos Aires that same year. At that time, on the international scene, women's football had acquired a unprecedented popularity. Some years earlier in England the Dick, Kerr Ladies F.C. had become the country's biggest sporting attraction, and in France a national championship was opened in 1919 and ran until 1939.

=== 1950s ===
The first records mentioned above and the scarce news from this decade, there is a gap in history that has yet to be completed. The coach Bettina Stagñares has two photographs, circa 1950s, showing women playing football. One of them was her mother: Nélida Zulma "Beba" González. Lucila Sandoval, founder of the Pioneras project, an organization dedicated to rebuilding and disseminating the history of women's football in Argentina, he mentioned in an interview a newspaper clipping from 1956 as the oldest record he currently has in his archive.

In 1959 the magazine "Goles" dedicated a prominent place on its cover to a football match between women. Inside the copy, the note entitled "They play, argue and get to each other like men" was entitled "The woman invades football" and gave an account of a benefit match on the Tigre between a team from Barrio Parque de Ingeniero Maschwitz and another from club San Justo de Benavídez. The title of the note alluded to certain altercations that occurred between the players.

It was approximately at the end of this decade that several of the players who would stand out in the following years began their training, those that Sandoval calls "the first generation of pioneers."

=== 1960s ===
In the 1960s, several women's football matches were played between clubs. There is a filmic record of a match played in 1964 at the Tigre court, and a year later a match between Club Atlético Tigre and the Alberdi Cultural Center was played on the Students' field, which featured a notable attendance of the public and a collection of $300,200. (Note: As data to compare, that same day the men's match between Atenas and Instituto de Córdoba raised $70,000.) Tigre was considered one of the best women's teams of the time and five of the players who participated in the 1971 World Cup in Mexico emerged from its ranks: Gloria "Betty" García, Blanca Brúccoli, Eva Lembessi, Zulma Gómez and Zunilda Troncoso. Alberdi's team had started in 1964 and two months before the match against Tigre he had held an exhibition match on the Belgrano de Coronel Moldes court with a collection of $61,800. Mercedes Luna, who was nicknamed "Pelé", was the main figure of Alberdi's team.

An international match was played at least as early as 1962, at Estadio Belvedere against Uruguay.

=== 1970s ===
At the beginning of the 1970s, only a few institutions in the city of Buenos Aires accepted female football players: among the available options were the clubs Piraña, Excursionistas, University and All Boys. Simultaneously, in other parts of the country, exhibition matches and tours of women's teams were held, which were organized by businessmen who charged for entry. Informality was such that a delegation unofficial players represented Argentina in the 1971 Women's World Cup. In 2019, 21 August was designated as Footballers' Day in commemoration of the four goals scored by Elba Selva in the match against England during the tournament. In 1978 a month-long metropolitan tournament that was won by Racing Club. Some of the participating teams, in addition to the already mentioned champion, were Yupanqui, Excursionistas, Minué was a team without a club that in the 1980s he would join Yupanqui. and San Fernando. On the Racing team there were three players who had been World Cup players in 1971: Gloria "Betty" García, Marta Soler and Virginia Cattaneo. The playing conditions were generally precarious: sometimes they played on dirt pitches, sometimes the improvisation of goals was required and most of the footballers wore shoes, except for the World Cup players, who had been given boots.

=== 1980s ===
Between 1985 and 1986, the Ladies Subcommittee of the Independent Club San Alberto de Ituzaingó organized a series of championships and friendly matches for women's football. One of the most widely publicized matches was the one played in April 1986 by the women's teams from Independiente San Alberto and Defensores de Lomas de Zamora as a preliminary to the men's match between Deportivo Morón and Argentino.

In 1986, with Doña Tota, mother of Diego Maradona, as godmother of honor, the Argentine Association of Women's Football (AAFF) was created, founded and chaired by Evelina Cabrera and much more creation recent, in 2013. independent group of AFA that would organize championships metropolitans and that, despite its amateur nature, it would even finance trips to play international matches.

Nils Altuna was the president and main promoter of the association. The local tournaments were called Femigol and Yupanqui was the champion and great dominator of them until 1991, in which the AFA championships began and in which the AAFF disappeared as an institution independent as it is absorbed by the official organization.

=== Amateur from AFA ===
In the mid-1980s, FIFA had determined to promote women's football and as part of that process in 1991 the first World Cup Women in China and the first South American Women's Championship in Brazil.

It was within this framework that on 27 October 1991, the first official women's football tournament in Argentina began organized by AFA, known as the Campeonato de Fútbol Femenino (Women's Football Championship). This tournament had the participation of eight teams and the winner was River Plate.

The second edition of the tournament was won by Boca Juniors and then River achieved a run of five consecutive championships. River Plate was Coco Torres, who at the same time served as technical director of the Argentina women's national football team that played its first official match in 1993 .

In 1997, there was a notable increase in the number of clubs registered for the tournament, from only nine teams that had participated in the previous edition, the figure increased to twenty-two. At that time the most prominent matches were broadcast by the TV channel Siempre Mujer, with former goalkeeper Sergio Goycochea officiating as commentator.

In 2000, a South American club championship was held in Peru with the participation of two Argentine teams: River Plate and Banfield. Although it was not an official tournament, several South American champion teams participated in it and could be considered a precedent of what would later become the Copa Libertadores Femenina.

River Plate and Boca Juniors alternated first place in the local competition for 17 years. It was not until 2008 that San Lorenzo broke that dominance, also qualifying for the first edition of the Copa Libertadores Femenina.

In 2011 the participation of clubs that are not directly affiliated with the Argentine Football Association was allowed and in 2015 the Primera B Championship (Second Division) started.

=== Professionalistation ===
Macarena Sánchez, a footballer for UAI Urquiza, was the main promoter of the project for the professionalization and visibility of Argentine women's football. She had problems with the leadership after expressing her opinion of a fairer treatment for female football players and has received threats through social networks.

On 16 March 2019, the professionalization of women's football in Argentina was made official. A minimum of 8 footballers hired per club and a salary of fifteen thousand pesos (equivalent to a male First C contract) was defined. Magalí Moreno, footballer from Lanús, gave his opinion on the matter: "The contribution of the AFA will improve our income, in order to train and dedicate ourselves more, but I doubt that we can live with 13 thousand pesos. In the morning I work four hours in a consortium administration and in the afternoon I am a nanny, after that I am going to train. "

=== Recent developments ===
In recent years, UAI Urquiza has grown as one of the benchmarks in Argentine women's football, being on a par with Boca Juniors and River Plate in terms of tournaments won and players summoned to the selection. Other clubs such as Racing, Gimnasia y Esgrima LP, San Lorenzo, Talleres, Platense and Independiente have contributed on several occasions footballers to those selected from all categories.

As of 2022, no club indirectly affiliated with the AFA has been able to participate in official tournaments. No Argentine team managed to reach the final of the Copa Libertadores and there is still a marked difference between the clubs based in Buenos Aires (especially Boca and River) and clubs based elsewhere in the country.

The Pioneras del Fútbol Femenino association, founded by Lucila Sandoval, is one of the main organisations promoting women's football in Argentina.

According to a report from the International Football Congress, women's football was the sporting activity with the highest growth worldwide during the 2010s. For its part, the Argentine Women's Football Association (AFFAR) estimates that around one million women practice football. discipline in the national territory. There has also been a very notable increase in the opening of female football schools, only in the city of Buenos Aires there would be more than fifty while in Buenos Aires suburbs would exceed one hundred. The age range of the women who go to these establishments would vary mainly between four and forty years.

== National team ==
In 1971, the Argentine National Team participated for the first time in a women's World Cup. That time, the 17 players traveled to Mexico without boots, a doctor, a massage therapist or a coach. They were in fourth position, having won only one game.

In what was the best time in terms of sports results, Argentina participated in the South American Championship for Women 2003, obtaining second place and qualification for the first time in history at the 2003 FIFA Women's World Cup, also qualified for the 2003 Pan American Games, to which only the best six selected from the continent were accessing at that time. In the 2006 South American Women's Football Championship, Argentina conquered the first place, managed to dethrone Brazil, which dominated the South American scene, from the beginning of the international competitions organized by Conmebol.

In the 2006 South American Women's Football Championship Argentina conquered first place, managed to dethrone Brazil, which dominated the South American scene, since the beginning of international competitions organized by Conmebol. With that first place Argentina achieved a historic triumph, obtained direct qualification to the 2007 FIFA Women's World Cup, qualification for the first time to the 2008 Beijing Olympic Games and secured their participation in the 2007 Pan American Games, a competition that at that time was reserved for the top ten finishers from across the continent . Although Argentina in these first World Cup events was eliminated in the first round, only sixteen selected from all participated in these competitions

Although Argentina in these first World Cup events was eliminated in the first round, only sixteen selected from around the world participated in these competitions.

In September 2017, Argentine National Team players held a strike to claim the right to use the Ezeiza property and an increase in per diem (it was 140 Argentine pesos per training).

Prior to the 2018 FIFA World Cup, Laurina Oliveros was downloaded on Twitter for the presentation of the shirt, which was made by a model.

In the 2018 Copa América Femenina, they finished third, thus qualifying to the playoffs for a place in the World Cup. Soledad Jaimes was the national team's top scorer in the tournament. During this championship, the claims were repeated, this time posing with one hand to the ear during the institutional photo, in reference to the fact that they were not being listened to, to ask for travel expenses, clothing and improvements in economic rewards.

In June 2019, the National Team played again in the World Cup, after 12 years without qualifying.

At the Lima 2019 Pan American Games, the Argentina national team obtained its first medal in the Olympic Games, becoming a historic event for the discipline.

== Women's football and fight for equality ==
With the aim of making visible the unequal rights experienced by women who engage in this sport, players belonging to different clubs organized the "Pibas con Pelotas" collective. The first meeting was held in October 2019 in the San Telmo neighborhood (CABA). A video emerged from it claiming a "horizontal, democratic and sorora" organization.

In addition, in September 2019 the "First Congress of Female Coaches of Argentina" was held, organized jointly by the Association of Argentine Football Coaches, and the Santa Fe Football League.

On 12 August 2020, the Argentine Football Association (AFA), through its Development Commission, and with the participation of the AFA Medical Department, held the "First International Meeting of Sports Medicine in Women's Football", aimed at professionals in sports medicine and science applied to women's football.

== See also ==
- Campeonato de Fútbol Feminino
- Argentina women's national football team

== Bibliography ==
- ¡Qué jugadora!: Un siglo de fútbol femenino en la Argentina ISBN 9789873804939
- Futbolera: A History of Women and Sports in Latin America ISBN 9781477310427 page 368
- Sampaoli, Julieta; Latreite, Pablo; Portillo, Lucas; Pierini, Merlina (2020). Seminario de fútbol femenino (1° edition). La Plata: Facultad de Periodismo y Comunicación Social de la Universidad Nacional de La Plata. ISBN 978-950-34-1936-6.
