= Copa 71 =

- Directed by: Rachel Ramsay; James Erskine
- Produced by: Victoria Gregory; Jannat Gargi; Anna Godas
- Starring: Brandi Chastain; Alex Morgan; Elena Schiavo; Elba Selva; Carol Wilson
- Production companies: New Black Films; Dogwoof; Westbrook Studios
- Distributed by: Dogwoof
- Release dates: 7 September 2023 (Toronto); 8 March 2024
- Running time: 90 minutes
- Country: United Kingdom
- Language: English

Copa 71 is a 2023 documentary film. The film follows the history of the 1971 Women's World Cup.

== Release ==
Copa 71 had its world premiere at the 2023 Toronto International Film Festival on 7 September 2023. The film had its UK Premiere at the 2023 BFI London Film Festival on 8 October 2023. Its wide release began on 8 March 2024. It was selected for the Hebden Bridge Film Festival (HBFF) 2024, where it was the opening night film in March 2024. Alongside the screening was a Q&A with some of the Lost Lionesses; sports historians; and Issy Pollard, an England footballer from Hebden Bridge. The film won the Audience award for Best Feature.

== Reception ==
The movie got an overwhelmingly positive reception from critics.
