= Lone Nielsen =

Danish footballer (1948–1997)

Personal information
- Full name: Lone Grete Nielsen
- Date of birth: 1948
- Date of death: 1997 (aged 48–49)

Senior career*
Years	Team	Apps	(Gls)
- Hvidovre IF

International career
1970–1971	Denmark		
Medal record
Women's football
Women's World Cup
Gold medal – first place	1971 Mexico	Team
- * Club domestic league appearances and goals

Lone Nielsen (1948–1997) was a Danish footballer, who played for Hvidovre IF. She won the unofficial 1971 Women's World Cup with the Denmark women's national team. In 2019, she was posthumously inducted into the Danish Football Association Hall of Fame as part of the 1971 World Cup squad.

== International career ==
Nielsen made her first and only appearance in the 1971 World Cup when she came on as substitute for Helene Østergaard Hansen in the group stage match against Italy, which ended in a 1–1 draw.
