= Harry Batt (football manager) =

English coach

Personal information
- Date of birth: 1906 or 1907
- Date of death: 1985

Managerial career
- Years: Team
- 1969: Chiltern Valley Ladies
- 1969–1972: England (unofficial)

Harry Batt (1906 or 1907 – 1985) was an English professional football coach and manager. After he managed the British Independents, an unsanctioned women's national team that represented England at the unofficial 1971 Women's World Cup, he was banned for life from football by the Football Association (FA).

== Early life ==
Batt was wounded fighting for the anti-Francoist Republicans in the Spanish Civil War and was subsequently a merchant seaman in World War II.

== Coaching and management ==
Batt was in his sixties and working as a bus driver when he started Chiltern Valley Ladies FC in Luton with his wife, June, in 1969. The Batts believed woman's professional soccer was achievable in the UK, although from 1921 to 1970, men's teams were banned from allowing women footballers to use their facilities, which made fundraising from gate fees impossible. He took unofficial England women's teams primarily consisting of Chiltern Valley players to a 1969 European Championship and the 1970 Women's World Cup organised in Italy by the short-lived Federation of Independent European Female Football (FIEFF).

He became the manager of the British Independents, an unofficial UK team consisting of players he scouted who played in the unsanctioned first Women's World Cup in Mexico City in August 1971. (Despite the team name and their not wearing the three lions crest of England in deference to the FA, they were billed as Inglaterra.) At the matches, he reportedly chain-smoked and "chain-swore". The team were popular with the crowds but outclassed by semi-professional opponents with a highly physical playing style, and lost all their matches with several injuries.

On return, for participation in unsanctioned international competition Batt and his wife were blacklisted by the Women's Football Association (WFA), which had been preparing to form an official England national team but had declined the invitation to the Mexico World Cup. He was barred for life by the FA from coaching or managing, and Chiltern Valley Ladies were ordered to be disbanded.

== Later life and death ==
Ted Hart, a public relations representative for the England men's team at the 1970 World Cup, proposed a 1972 Women's World Cup to be held at Wembley Stadium, with a WFA 'A' team and a 'B' team recruited by Batt; the WFA committee initially narrowly approved the proposal on condition that neither Batt nor teams involved in the FIEFF be involved, and subsequently rejected it after the chairman cast a tie-breaking vote. In 1972, he unsuccessfully requested the lifting of his WFA ban. According to his son, the ban caused him to become withdrawn and stop watching football. Jan Emms, one of the World Cup players, said in 2024, "It completely broke Harry when he got that ban."

Batt last worked at Luton bus station. He was diagnosed with cancer in the early 1980s and died in 1985, aged 78.

A blue plaque unveiled in September 2023 at the recreation ground in Crawley Green where Chiltern Valley Ladies played honours them, the British Independents, and Harry and June Batt.
