= Royer =

Royer may refer to:

== Surnames ==
- Alain de Royer-Dupré (born 1944), French racehorse trainer
- Ann Royer (born 1933), American painter and sculptor
- Alphonse Royer (1803–1875), French author, dramatist and theatre manager
- Augustin Royer (17th century), French architect and astronomer
- Bentley Royer (born 1955), Dominican politician
- Bill Royer (1929–2018), American politician
- Bob Royer (1927–1973), American basketball player
- Carlos Royer (1874–unknown) was a Cuban baseball player
- Casey Royer (born 1958), American drummer
- Charles Royer (1939–2024), American news reporter and politician, mayor of Seattle
- Clara Royer (born 1981), French writer
- Clémence Royer (1830–1902), French scientist and feminist
- Daniel Royer (born 1990), Austrian footballer
- Ernest de Royer (1808–1877), French lawyer, magistrate and politician
- Fanchon Royer (1902–1986), American film producer
- Gaétan Royer (born 1976), Canadian ice hockey player
- Ghislaine Royer-Souef (born 1953), French football player
- Heather Royer (born c.1974), American economist
- Henri Royer (1869–1938), French painter
- Henri de Royer-Dupré (1876–1960), French equestrian
- Herb Royer (1915–2003), American football coach
- Hugh Royer Jr. (1936–2014), American golfer
- Hugh Royer III (born 1964), American golfer and golf instructor
- Jacqueline Royer (1884–19??), French opera singer
- Jean Royer de Prade (born c.1624), French man of letters
- Jean Royer (1920–2011), French politician, mayor of Tours
- Joe Royer (born 2002), American football player
- Joseph Royer (architect) (1873–1954), American architect
- Joseph Royer (1884–1965), Canadian operatic baritone
- Joseph-Nicolas-Pancrace Royer (1703–1755), French composer
- Julien Royer (born 1982), French chef and restaurant owner
- Lee "Rock" Royer (c.1934–1973), American football coach
- Lionel Royer (1852–1926), French painter
- Lionel Royer-Perreaut (born 1972), French politician
- Louis Royer (1793–1868), Flemish sculptor
- Meggie Royer (fl. 21st century), American writer and artist
- Michelle Royer (born 1966), American television personality and beauty pageant title-holder
- Mike Royer (born 1941), American comics artist
- Philippe Le Royer (1816–1897), French and Swiss politician
- Pierre Paul Royer-Collard (1763–1845), French statesman and philosopher
- Rémi Royer (born 1978), Canadian ice hockey player
- Robb Royer (born 1942), American musician and songwriter,
- Robert A. Royer (1902–1957), American competitive swimmer and coach
- Sofie Royer (born 1991), Austrian artist and musician
- Stan Royer (born 1967) is an American baseball player
- Valentin Royer (born 2001), French tennis player
- Vincent Royer (born 1961), French violist and composer
- William Royer (1920–2013), American politician
- Zoe Royer (born 1965/6), Canadian politician

== Places ==
- Royer, Saône-et-Loire, a commune in the French region of Bourgogne
- Royer, Pennsylvania, United States, a census-designated place
- Le Royer Lake, one of the Obatogamau Lakes in Quebec, Canada

== Other uses ==
- Royer Labs, microphone company
- Royer oscillator, an electronic component

== See also ==
- Royères, French commune in Haute-Vienne, Limousin
- Florida v. Royer, US Supreme Court case relating to the Fourth Amendment
