= 1974 Women's Nordic Football Championship =

Tournament details
- Host country: Finland
- Dates: 26 July – 28 July 1974
- Teams: 3
- Venue: 2 (in 2 host cities)

Final positions
- Champions: Denmark (1st title)

Tournament statistics
- Matches played: 3
- Goals scored: 7 (2.33 per match)
- Attendance: 2,661 (887 per match)
- Top scorer: (Denmark) Annette Frederiksen (3 goals)

1974 Women's Nordic Football Championship was the first edition of the Women's Nordic Football Championship tournament. It was held from 26 July to 28 July in Mariehamn and Finström in Åland.

The match between Denmark and Sweden was the first international of the Denmark women's national football team.

== Standings ==
| Team | Pld | W | D | L | GF | GA | GD | Pts |
|---|---|---|---|---|---|---|---|---|
| Denmark | 2 | 2 | 0 | 0 | 6 | 0 | +6 | 4 |
| Sweden | 2 | 1 | 0 | 1 | 1 | 1 | 0 | 2 |
| Finland | 2 | 0 | 0 | 2 | 0 | 6 | −6 | 0 |

== Results ==
26 July 1974

| Finland | 0–1 | Sweden |
|---|---|---|
| | Finnish FA report Swedish FA report | Jansson 53' |

Idrottsparken, Mariehamn
Attendance: 696
Referee: Anders Mattsson, Finland

27 July 1974

| Denmark | 1–0 | Sweden |
|---|---|---|
| Stengård 53' (pen.) | Danish FA report Swedish FA report |

Markusböle idrottsplan, Finström
Attendance: 800

28 July 1974

| Denmark | 5–0 | Finland |
|---|---|---|
| Niemann 3', 49'; Frederiksen 5', 25', 62' | Danish FA report Finnish FA report |

Idrottsparken, Mariehamn
Attendance: 1,165
Referee: Matti Rajala, Finland

== Goalscorers ==
3 goals

- (Denmark) Annette Frederiksen

2 goals

- (Denmark) Susanne Niemann

1 goal

- (Sweden) Ann Jansson
- (Denmark) Ann Stengård

== Sources ==
- Nordic Championships (Women) 1974 Rec.Sport.Soccer Statistics Foundation
- Landsholdsdatabasen Danish Football Association
- Lautela, Yrjö & Wallén, Göran: Rakas jalkapallo — Sata vuotta suomalaista jalkapalloa, p. 418. Football Association of Finland / Teos Publishing 2007. ISBN 978-951-851-068-3.
