= Luciana Meles =

Italian footballer

Personal information
- Date of birth: 12 October 1951 (age 75)
- Position: Midfielder

International career
Years	Team	Apps	(Gls)
1968–1977	Italy	13	(1)

Luciana Meles (born 12 October 1951) is an Italian former footballer who played as a midfielder for Lazio.

== Judo career ==
Meles was a national Italian Judo champion.

== Honours ==
Italy

- 1969 European Competition for Women's Football
