= Chantal Serre =

French association football player (1950-2015)

Personal information
- Full name: Chantal Michelle Serre
- Date of birth: 28 August 1950
- Place of birth: Chaumont, France
- Date of death: 26 May 2015 (aged 64)
- Position: Defender

Senior career*
Years	Team	Apps	(Gls)
1971–1973	Reims		

International career
1971–1973	France	2	(0)
- * Club domestic league appearances and goals

Chantal Serre (born August 28, 1950 – May 26, 2015) was a French footballer who played as a defender for Reims of the Division 1 Féminine.

== International career ==
Serre represented France at the 1971 Women's World Cup. She earned two caps for the France national team, from 1971 to 1972.
