= Birte Kjems =

Danish footballer

Personal information
- Date of birth: 9 April 1949 (age 77)
- Position: Goalkeeper

Senior career*
Years	Team	Apps	(Gls)
- Ribe Boldklub

International career
1974-1983	Denmark	6	(0)
Medal record
Women's football
Women's World Cup
Gold medal – first place	1971 Mexico	Team
- * Club domestic league appearances and goals

Birte Kjems (born 9 April 1949), also referred to as Birthe Kjems, is a Danish former footballer who played as a goalkeeper for Ribe Boldklub and the Denmark women's national football team. She was a member of the Denmark team that won the unofficial 1971 Women's World Cup in Mexico.

== International career ==
Nielsen won six official caps for the Denmark women's national football team between 1974 and 1983, and made four appearances in the 1971 Women's World Cup in Mexico.

== Honours ==
National team

- 1971 Women's World Cup
