= Marianne Kamp =

Danish footballer

Personal information
- Date of birth: 1955
- Date of death: 2011 (aged 55–56)
- Place of death: Italy
- Position: Right winger

Senior career*
Years	Team	Apps	(Gls)
1968–1974	Skovlunde IF		
1974–1982	Bologna		

International career
1971	Denmark		
Medal record
Women's football
Women's World Cup
Gold medal – first place	1971 Mexico	Team
- * Club domestic league appearances and goals

Marianne Kamp (1955–2011) was a Danish professional footballer who played as a forward for Skovlunde IF, Serie A club Bologna, and the Denmark women's national football team.

== Club career ==
Kamp moved to Bologna to become a professional footballer in 1974, following six years with Danish club Skovlunde IF with which Kamp won the unofficial league championship and cup in the early 1970s.

== International career ==
Kamp was a member of the Denmark team that won the unofficial 1971 Women's World Cup in Mexico.

== Honours ==
National team

- 1971 Women's World Cup: Winners
