= Helene Hansen =

Helene Hansen may refer to:

- Helene Hansen (sailor) (born 1968), Danish sailor
- Helene Østergaard Hansen, Danish footballer
- Helene Kindberg (Helene Kindberg Hansen, born 1998), Danish handball player
