= Bente Jensen =

Danish footballer

Personal information
- Date of birth: 9 September 1951 (age 75)
- Position: Forward

Senior career*
Years	Team	Apps	(Gls)
- BK Stjernen

International career
1974–1976	Denmark	7	(1)
Medal record
Women's football
Women's World Cup
Gold medal – first place	1971 Mexico	Team
- * Club domestic league appearances and goals

Bente Kramager (née Jensen; born 9 September 1951) is a Danish former footballer who played as a forward for BK Stjernen and the Danish national team.

== International career ==
Jensen won seven official caps for the Denmark women's national football team between 1974 and 1976, and made four appearances in the 1971 Women's World Cup in Mexico.

== Honours ==
National team

- 1971 Women's World Cup
