= Charles Coypeau d'Assoucy =

French musician and poet

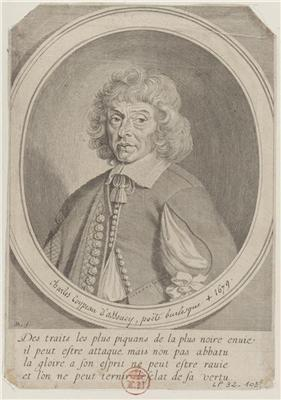
Charles Coypeau d'Assoucy.

Charles Coypeau (16 October 1605 Paris – 29 October 1677, Paris) was a French musician and burlesque poet. In the mid-1630s, he began using the nom de plume D'Assouci or Dassoucy.

== Life ==
From the time he was eight or nine, Charles Coypeau began running away from home. His father then placed him in the Jesuit College of Clermont, where he acquired a solid education in classics and Christian doctrine; but the boy was always sneaking away to watch the puppeteers and organ grinders on the Pont-Neuf. These contacts with players and musicians were a major factor in the formation of Charles's musical and poetic talents, and encouraged his bent for the "burlesque".

By the time he was 17, Charles had left Paris and had begun his long life of wandering, eking out a livelihood by composing, singing for local elites, and teaching the lute. By his mid-20s, he apparently had made his way to Italy; by the early 1630s, he had mastered the Italian theorbo, an instrument still rare in France.

In 1630, while in Grenoble, Charles met Pierre de Nyert, the gifted singer. Shortly after that, he went to England and performed at the court of Charles I, and then to the Low Countries, where he played and sang for the exiled Marguerite de Lorraine, duchess of Orléans. By 1636, Charles, who now called himself "Charles Coypeau, sieur of Assoucy" (or simply "d'Assoucy"), was living in Paris. Having been presented to Louis XIII, he was soon entertaining the French court and writing poems for the royal family. For over a decade, d'Assoucy participated in numerous court concerts, having been made a "musician in ordinary to the King" (musicien ordinaire du Roi).

In 1642, he made the acquaintance of Claude-Emmanuel L'Huillier, known as "Chapelle", the natural son of a wealthy financier. Through this connection to the L'Huilliers, d'Assoucy became part of a group of "free spirits" (libertins) around the philosopher Pierre Gassendi. Other members of the circle were Cyrano de Bergerac, Tristan l'Hermite, Saint-Amant, Paul Scarron, and a young playwright who went by the name "Molière". Saint-Amant and Scarron had already introduced into France the burlesque travesty or parody, a distinctive poetic genre written in eight-syllable rhyming couplets studded with puns and erotic allusions, that treated mythological or historical subjects in a comic fashion, rather than the usual heroic or epic manner. D'Assoucy was soon writing in this "burlesque" style: his first travesty was Le Jugement de Pâris (1646–1647); his second was Ovide en belle humeur, a travesty of Ovid's Métamorphoses (1649).

D'Assoucy remained active musically. In 1647, he played theorbo at Fontainebleau with a group of Italian musicians for Luigi Rossi's Orfeo. In 1648, the Théâtre du Marais asked him to set to music the airs for La grande journée ou le mariage d'Orphée et Eurydice, a pièce à machines ("play with machines"), that is a play with music, dancing and special effects. Pierre Corneille commissioned him to write music for Andromède (1650), a "play with machines" (pièce à machines), and d'Assoucy was hailed as "one of the most famous masters of [the musical] art." That same year saw the creation and publication of d'Assoucy's own Les Amours d'Apollon et de Daphné, the first comédie en musique, a new genre that was the forerunner of the French-language operas Lully would begin writing in the early 1670s.

By the late 1640s, the circle of "free spirits" had begun to disintegrate: d'Assoucy and Scarron had quarreled in 1648, and in 1650 d'Assoucy and Cyrano attacked one another with their pens. The feud involved a series of satirical texts. Bergerac wrote Contre Soucidas (an anagram of his enemy's name) and Contre un ingrat ("Against an Ungrateful Person"), while d'Assoucy counterattacked with Le Combat de Cyrano de Bergerac avec le singe de Brioché au bout du Pont-Neuf ("The Battle Between Cyrano de Bergerac and Brioché's Monkey On the Pont-Neuf Bridge"). It has been suggested that d'Assoucy was Cyrano's lover. Not long after this dispute, d'Assoucy broke with Chapelle.

Accompanied by two "musical pages", d'Assoucy set off in the summer of 1650 for Turin, with letters of introduction to "Madame Royale", Regent of Savoy. (He had recently begun singling out talented adolescent boys, "pages", to whom he would teach the theorbo and singing.) Madame Royale apparently was less than enchanted, and by December 1651 d'Assoucy was back in southern France, where the Estates of Languedoc were meeting. There he renewed his friendship with Molière, whose theatrical troop was performing for the Estates. Back in Paris by late 1652, d'Assoucy reminded Louis XIV of the position he had once held in the royal music, collected what was due on his pension, and played occasionally for the king. He was also composing and publishing songs, giving lessons on the lute and theorbo, and writing poems, among them the Ravissement de Proserpine (April 1653).

In 1655, d'Assoucy began over a decade of wandering that he recounted in his Rimes redoublées and in his two-volume Aventures des voyages du Sieur d'Assoucy where fact rubs shoulders with hyperbole and, perhaps, outright fiction. In the early summer of 1655, he set off for Turin with yet another musical "page," a talented boy named Pierre Valentin, known to d'Assoucy's readers as "Pierrotin" and to Italian music-lovers as "Pietro Valentino". The reasons for their hasty departure can only be guessed: creditors? the ultra-devout Compagnie du Saint Sacrement, which viewed travesties as immoral? gambling? his long-standing relations with the "free thinkers"? his persisting interest in young boys? Perhaps a bit of them all? At Lyon he again encountered Molière and went with him to Languedoc, where the troop performed for the Estates. While in Montpellier, d'Assoucy was imprisoned, apparently on moral grounds.

After wandering from city to city for two years, d'Assoucy and his page reached Turin in June 1657. Once again d'Assoucy's bid to join the musicians of Madame Royale failed, probably because the elderly and pious Duchess was repelled by his equivocal verse and his maladroit conduct. By 1658, he and his page had left Turin, hoping for patronage at the court of the Gonzagas at Mantua. Captivated by the talents of thirteen-year-old Pierrotin, the Duke of Mantua tried to buy him, and when that failed he kidnapped the boy and spirited him off to Venice, where he was castrated and studied with the famous master, Giovanni Bicilli. d'Assoucy followed Pierrotin's trail for a full year, stopping in Venice, Modena, Florence, and by early 1662, Rome.

During most of his six years in Rome, d'Assoucy was relatively prosperous. He received substantial gifts from the various nobles for whom he wrote poems or performed music. For example, in early 1666, he was briefly in touch with Queen Christina of Sweden, and in 1666–1667 he was in the pay of the French Ambassador and contributed to several lavish musical entertainments in the Farnese Palace where the Ambassador resided. It perhaps was at the Farnese, in 1667, that d'Assoucy met Marc-Antoine Charpentier and offered him "my bread and my pity." At the time, D'Assoucy himself was in financial straits. He had gotten Pierrotin back in 1664 and for three years had spent most of his income on the singer, who had become a drunk and a thief. In November 1667, the indebted d'Assoucy had the youth arrested; and in December he himself was imprisoned by the Holy Office. Liberated in the fall of 1668, he quickly set off for France.

Back in Paris by the fall of 1670, he renewed his friendship with Molière, who proposed that d'Assoucy write music for his forthcoming pièce à machines, the Malade imaginaire. About September 1672 Molière reneged on the offer and gave the commission to Marc-Antoine Charpentier.

In March 1673, d'Assoucy was yet again imprisoned. After five months he was liberated and acquitted through the intervention of Louis XIV, who not only appointed him musician to the royal household but also awarded him a pension. He continued to write circumstantial poetry, particularly in honor of the king. On 29 October 1677, he died in his lodging on the Île de la Cité.

== D'Assoucy, the writer ==
D'Assoucy's position in French literature was summarized by Charles E. Scruggs (pp. 55–56):

"D'Assoucy was influenced by some of the most liberal free-thinkers of his day, from the epicurian philosophy of Gassendi and La Mothe le Vayer to the unbounded hedonism of his close friend Chapelle. Unattracted by dry speculation, Dassoucy was much closer attuned to Chapelle than to the epicurians. His artistic sensibilities are reflected in the loosely associated Parisian literary circle of the sixteen forties. This group, among whom were Cyrano, Tristan, Scarron, Chapelle, d'Assoucy and Le Royer de Prade, expounded a literary theory that ran counter to the rule-governed 'classical' esthetic which was fast developing."

== Works online ==
- Aventures burlesques de Dassoucy
- L’Ovide en belle humeur
- Le jugement de Pâris en vers burlesques
- Le ravissement de Proserpine : poème burlesque d’après Claudien
- Les rimes redoublées de M. Dassoucy
- Poësies et lettres de M. Dassoucy, contenant diverses pièces héroïques, satiriques et burlesques
