= Asta Vig =

Danish footballer

Personal information
- Birth name: Asta Vig
- Date of birth: 22 May 1949 (age 77)
- Place of birth: Horne, Varde, Denmark
- Position: Left-back

Senior career*
Years	Team	Apps	(Gls)
–1974	Billum IF		

International career
1971	Denmark		
Medal record
Women's football
Women's World Cup
Gold medal – first place	1971 Mexico	Team
- * Club domestic league appearances and goals

Asta Vig Sørensen (born 22 May 1949) is a Danish former footballer who played as a left-back for Billum IF and the Denmark women's national football team.

== International career ==
Vig was a member of the Denmark team that won the unofficial 1971 Women's World Cup in Mexico. While on the reserves initially, she was promoted to the starting line-up playing left-back.

== Honours ==
National team

- 1971 Women's World Cup: Winners
