= 1977 Women's Nordic Football Championship =

Tournament details
- Host country: Finland
- Dates: 8–10 July 1977
- Teams: 3
- Venue: 1 (in 1 host city)

Final positions
- Champions: Sweden (1st title)

Tournament statistics
- Matches played: 3
- Goals scored: 6 (2 per match)
- Attendance: 1,298 (433 per match)
- Top scorer: (Sweden) Ann-Kristin Lindkvist (2 goals)

1977 Women's Nordic Football Championship was the fourth edition of the Women's Nordic Football Championship tournament. It was held from 8 July to 10 July in Mariehamn in Åland.

== Standings ==
Team	Pld	W	D	L	GF	GA	GD	Pts
Sweden	2	2	0	0	5	0	+5	4
Denmark	2	1	0	1	1	1	±0	2
Finland	2	0	0	2	0	5	−5	0

== Results ==
8 July 1977

Finland	0–4	Sweden
	Report	Söderström 34'; Lindkvist 55'; Erlandsson 68'; Sundhage 70'

Idrottsparken, Mariehamn
Attendance: 647
Referee: Rolf Bergman, Finland

9 July 1977
19:00

Denmark	0–1	Sweden
	Report	Lindkvist 10'

Idrottsparken, Mariehamn
Attendance: 449
Referee: Anders Mattsson, Finland

10 July 1977
13:00

Denmark	1–0	Finland
Holst 65'	Report

Idrottsparken, Mariehamn
Attendance: 200
Referee: Roger Humell, Finland

== Goalscorers ==
2 goals

- (Sweden) Ann-Kristin Lindkvist

1 goal

- (Sweden) Susanne Erlandsson
- (Denmark) Anne Grete Holst
- (Sweden) Pia Sundhage
- (Sweden) Birgitta Söderström

== Sources ==
- Nordic Championships (Women) 1977 Rec.Sport.Soccer Statistics Foundation
- Landsholdsdatabasen Danish Football Association
- Lautela, Yrjö & Wallén, Göran: Rakas jalkapallo — Sata vuotta suomalaista jalkapalloa, p. 418. Football Association of Finland / Teos Publishing 2007. ISBN 978-951-851-068-3.
