= Nicole Mangas =

French footballer

Personal information
- Date of birth: 23 July 1950 (age 76)
- Place of birth: Wassy, France
- Position: Defender

Senior career*
Years	Team	Apps	(Gls)
1968-1969	Marnaval		
1968-1979	Reims		
1973-1977	Peco Saronno		

International career
1971-1973	France	7	(0)
- * Club domestic league appearances and goals

Nicole Mangas (born 23 July 1950) is a French football player who played as defender for French club Stade de Reims of the Division 1 Féminine and the France national team. Mangas represented France at the 1971 Women's World Cup in Mexico.

== International career ==
Mangas represented France in the first FIFA sanctioned women's international against the Netherlands on April 17, 1971.
