= Helene Østergaard Hansen =

Danish footballer

Personal information
- Date of birth: 1941 (age 84–85)
- Position: Forward

Senior career*
Years	Team	Apps	(Gls)
'60s–'70s	Boldklubben Femina		

International career
1969–1971	Denmark		
Medal record
Women's football
World Cup
Gold medal – first place	1971 Mexico	Team
Gold medal – first place	1970 Italy	Team
Euros
Silver medal – second place	1969 Italy	Team
- * Club domestic league appearances and goals

Helene Østergaard Hansen (born 1941) is a Danish former footballer who played as a forward for Boldklubben Femina and the Denmark women's national football team. Along with her gold-winning teammates, Hansen was inducted into the Danish Football Hall of Fame in 2019.

== Honours ==
National team

- 1971 Women's World Cup
