= Lost Lionesses =

England's first women's football team

British Independents
- Nickname: Lost Lionesses
- Head coach: Harry Batt
- Captain: Carol Wilson

"Lost Lionesses" is a name retroactively applied to the first women's football team to represent England at a major international tournament, the 1971 Women's World Cup in Mexico. Being unofficial, unrecognised, and disbanded shortly after their return to England, the team was largely overlooked for nearly 50 years, first gaining widespread media coverage in England in 2019. The team called themselves the British Independents, but were billed as "Inglaterra" (Spanish for "England") during the competition.

== History ==
Women's football in England was banned by the Football Association (FA) from 1921 to 1971. In 1969, the Women's Football Association (WFA) was founded, and it oversaw women's football after the ban was lifted. In 1967, Patricia Gregory watched the victory parade for Tottenham Hotspur's 1967 FA Cup victory and wondered why there was no women's team; sending this question to a local newspaper, it was printed and received responses from girls wanting to join a team. Around the same time, Harry Batt was also trying to start women's football teams. While Gregory was a young woman seeking to play, Batt was an older man inspired by women's football in Italy. Batt was a bus driver at the time he founded Chiltern Valley Ladies in Luton, but was a linguist who had been injured fighting against Francisco Franco's Nationalists in the Spanish Civil War before being part of the Merchant Navy in World War II. Both Gregory and Batt were involved in the WFA, which rejected professionalism of the women's game and was unimpressed with Batt taking Chiltern Valley and others to Europe to play in competitions, in part because they were in the process of founding the first official England women's national football team. Batt's teams in international competition adopted the British Independents name, and did not wear the Three Lions, to appease the WFA.

Batt scouted players from his own team as well as others around South East England to form international representative sides that played in FIEFF European football competitions, as well as the 1970 Women's World Cup (itself an all-European FIEFF-organised competition) in Italy.

There were fourteen players in the team that went to the 1971 Women's World Cup, most of them teenagers without work obligations over the summer and so able to travel. The trip was funded by Martini & Rossi, who sponsored the team. They were received very well in Mexico, barraged by fans from their arrival and needing a police escort to the Estadio Azteca. Here, they played to a reported 90,000 capacity crowd when they lost to Mexico; the host team was also fond of them, throwing a farewell party. Though the coverage of the team in England was far inferior to that in Mexico, the MP for Luton suggested injuries they sustained should be investigated, with local newspapers variously writing about the rough play of their opponents and the popularity of the team among the Mexicans. When the team returned to England, many of the players were given suspensions, subsequently suppressing their experiences with the Lost Lionesses for many years. Batt was banned from football and his teams disbanded, something which his son said broke his spirit entirely; he became introverted and did not speak about football again. The FIEFF was shortly after banned by FIFA.

Designer Martine Rose would later discover the story that "transcends gender and age", collaborating with Nike on a commemorative shirt in 2021 for the team's 50th anniversary. After being first reunited in 2018, and a guest of UEFA to watch England at the 2019 FIFA Women's World Cup, the team have regular reunions. They have met at the National Football Museum and Wembley Stadium, with some campaigning for the Football Association to officially recognise their team.

== Players ==
- Yvonne Bradley (née Farr)
- Jean Breckon
- Leah Caleb
- Valerie Cheshire
- Janice Emms (née Barton; mother of Gail Emms)
- Louise Gardner (née Cross)
- Lilian Harris (goalkeeper)
- Chris Lockwood
- Trudy McCaffery
- Paula Milnes (née Rayner)
- Marlene Rowe (née Collins)
- Gillian Sayell
- Jill Stockley
- Carol Wilson, captain
