= Inger Pedersen (footballer) =

Danish footballer

Personal information
- Date of birth: 8 March 1950
- Date of death: 1 March 2022 (aged 71)
- Position: Midfielder

Senior career*
Years	Team	Apps	(Gls)
1970–1974	Virum-Sorgenfri Boldklub		
1974–	Boldklubben Femina		

International career
1975–1982	Denmark	25	(3)
Medal record
Women's football
Women's World Cup
Gold medal – first place	1971 Mexico	Team
- * Club domestic league appearances and goals

Inger Pedersen (born 8 March 1950), nicknamed Tulle, is a Danish former footballer who played as a midfielder for Virum-Sorgenfri Boldklub and the Denmark women's national football team. At club level, Pedersen started her career with Virum-Sorgenfri (VSB) in 1970 and later joined BK Femina. With Femina, Pedersen won the Danish league thrice; in 1975, 1977, and 1980. She was the first ever VSB player to be called up to the national team.

== Honours ==
National team

- 1971 Women's World Cup
