= Solveig Sørensen =

Danish footballer

Personal information
- Position: Defender

Senior career*
Years	Team	Apps	(Gls)
- Rødovre Boldklub

International career
1971	Denmark		
Medal record
Women's football
Women's World Cup
Gold medal – first place	1971 Mexico	Team
- * Club domestic league appearances and goals

Solveig Sørensen is a Danish former footballer who played as a defender for Rødovre Boldklub and the Denmark women's national football team. Soreensen was also a Danish international handball player.

== Honours ==
National team

- 1971 Women's World Cup
