= Ann Stengård =

Danish footballer (born 1955)

Personal information
- Birth name: Ann Andreasen
- Date of birth: 29 July 1955 (age 71)
- Position: Forward

International career
Years	Team	Apps	(Gls)
1974–1980	Denmark	12	(2)
Medal record
Women's football
Women's World Cup
Gold medal – first place	1971 Mexico	Team

Ann Stengård (née Andreasen; born 27 July 1955) is a Danish former footballer who played as a midfielder for BK Stjernen and the Danish national team. Stengård represented Denmark at the unofficial 1971 Women's World Cup. In 2019, Stengård and her teammates were inducted into the Danish Football Association Hall of Fame for their win.

== International career ==
Stengård played twelve official international matches and scored twice for the Denmark women's national football team. Until 1972, women's football was not officially recognised by the Danish Football Association in discrimination based on gender. However, Stengård was selected for the squad which competed in and ultimately won the unofficial 1971 Women's World Cup. Following the victory of Stengård and her teammates, the football association official recognised the women's sport in February 1972, with the first official match taking place in 1974.
