= Maryse Lesieur =

French footballer (born 1950)

Personal information
- Date of birth: 27 February 1950 (age 76)
- Place of birth: Reims, France
- Position: Defender

Senior career*
Years	Team	Apps	(Gls)
1968-1979	Reims		

International career
1972-1986	France	3	(0)
- * Club domestic league appearances and goals

Maryse Lesieur (born 27 February 1950) is a French football player who played as defender for French club Stade de Reims of the Division 1 Féminine.

== International career ==
Lesieur represented France in the first FIFA sanctioned women's international against the Netherlands on April 17, 1971.

== Personal life ==
Maryse Lesieur was married to Pierre Geoffroy the founder of Stade de Reims Féminines.
