= Michèle Monier =

French footballer (born 1946)

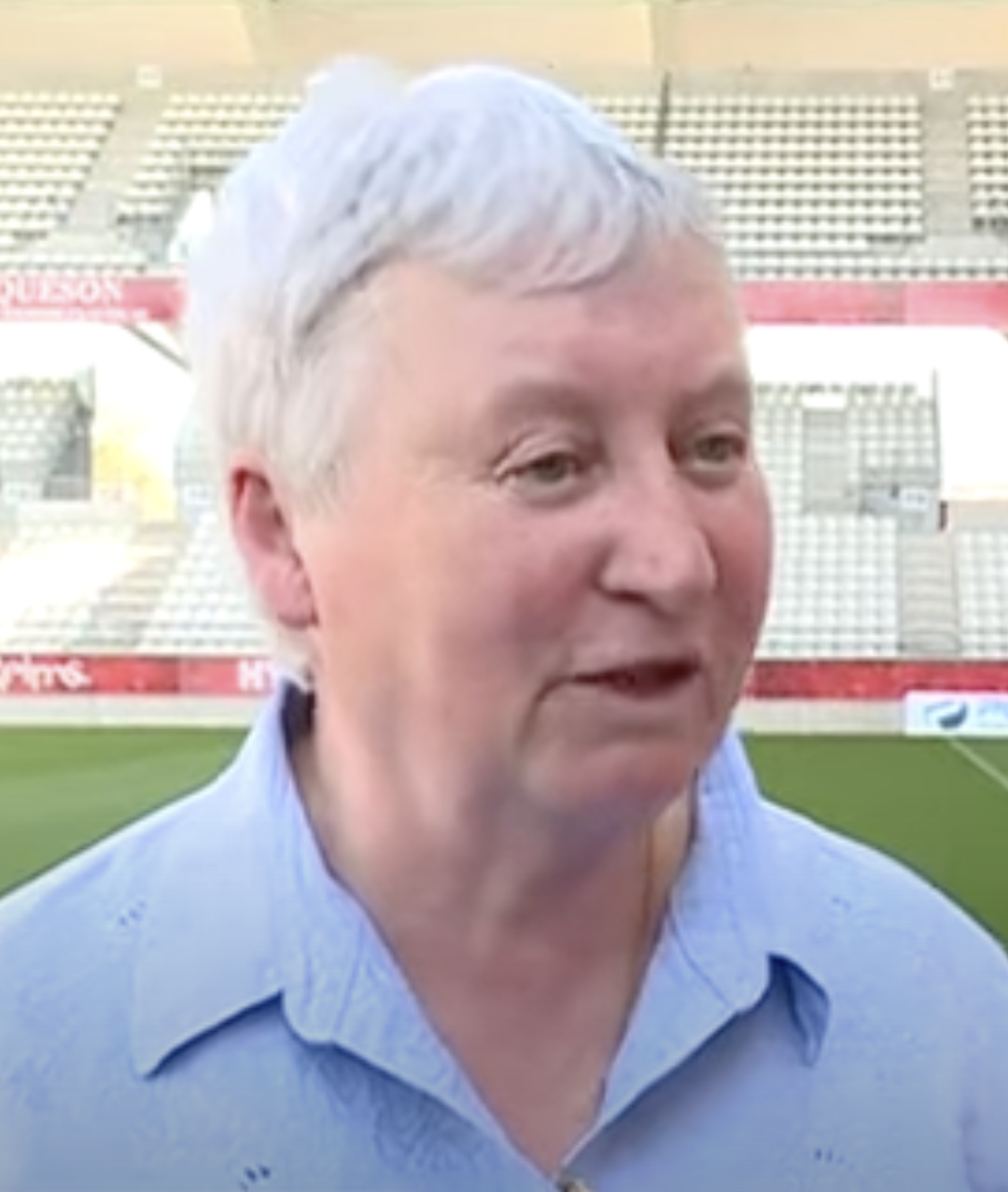

Personal information
- Date of birth: 16 July 1946 (age 80)
- Place of birth: Thugny-Trugny, France
- Position: Midfielder

Senior career*
Years	Team	Apps	(Gls)
1968-1979	Reims		

International career
1971	France	1	(0)
- * Club domestic league appearances and goals

Michèle Monier (born 16 July 1946) is a French football player who played as midfielder for French club Stade de Reims of the Division 1 Féminine.

== International career ==
Monier represented France in the first FIFA sanctioned women's international against the Netherlands on April 17, 1971. Monier represented France at the 1971 Women's World Cup.
