= Giuseppe Cavicchi =

Italian association football manager (born 1920)

Personal information
- Date of birth: 31 May 1920
- Position: Striker

Senior career*
Years	Team	Apps	(Gls)
1947-1948	Ventimigliese		

Managerial career
- 1967-1971: Real Torino
- 1969-1971: Italy
- * Club domestic league appearances and goals

Giuseppe Cavicchi (born 31 May 1920) was an Italian football manager and player. Cavicchi greatest achievement was winning the 1969 European Competition for Women's Football.

== Honours ==
Italy

- 1969 European Competition for Women's Football
