= Marie-Louise Butzig =

French footballer (1944-2017)

Personal information
- Full name: Marie-Louise Yvonne Butzig
- Date of birth: 15 November 1944
- Place of birth: Chablis, France
- Date of death: 6 March 2017 (aged 72)
- Place of death: Sedan, France
- Position: Goalkeeper

Senior career*
Years	Team	Apps	(Gls)
1971-1972	Vrigne-aux-Bois		
1972-1982	Reims		

International career
1971-1980	France	20	(0)
- * Club domestic league appearances and goals

Marie-Louise Butzig (15 November 1944 – 6 March 2017) was a French footballer who played as goalkeeper for French club Stade de Reims of the Division 1 Féminine. Butzig represented France in the first FIFA sanctioned women's international against the Netherlands, France won 4-0.

== Literature ==
- Gaillard, Claire (2019). La grande histoire des Bleues. Dans les coulisses de l'équipe de France féminine. Paris, France: Hachette. ISBN 978-2-0170-4705-6.
- Pascal Grégoire-Boutreau/Tony Verbicaro: Stade de Reims – une histoire sans fin., Cahiers intempestifs, Saint-Étienne 2001, ISBN 2-911698-21-5
- Lucien Perpère/Victor Sinet/Louis Tanguy: Reims de nos amours. 1931/1981 – 50 ans de Stade de Reims., Alphabet Cube, Reims 1981
- Laurence Prudhomme-Poncet: Histoire du football féminin au XXe siècle., L’Harmattan, Paris 2003, ISBN 2-7475-4730-2
