= Pat Dunn (referee) =

English football referee (1933–1999)

Pat Dunn (née Patricia Alice Thurston; 29 January 1933 – 11 July 1999) was among the first women to officially qualify as a football referee.

== Early life ==
Pat Dunn was born in London in 1933, the daughter of Lewis Henry Thurston (1893–1972) and his wife, Rebecca, née Stebbings, who died when Pat was one year old. The family moved from south London to Weymouth, Dorset, in the early Second World War. Pat became an enthusiastic footballer when growing up. After the family had moved again to Newbury, Berkshire, as a 15-year-old she joined Stroud Green Football Club – the only girl in the team.

== Personal life ==
In 1952 Pat married Alfred John (Alf) Dunn (1927–2000), a skilled labourer and public lighting attendant from Weymouth, who was also a keen footballer. Pat was later quoted as saying that ‘I couldn’t have married anyone who wasn’t interested in football’.

== Career as a referee ==
After leaving school Pat moved back to Weymouth where she worked as a proofreader and later, for 30 years, an accounts clerk on the local newspaper, the Dorset Evening Echo. Her life, however, centred on football and she soon wished to be become a referee, and began officiating in youth football and friendlies, where an official refereeing certificate was not needed.

She applied to take the official referees' examination in 1967 but the Football Association (FA) said that regulations did not then permit a registration certificate to be issued to a woman. Dunn continued to make her case and was allowed to take the examination in September that year, and passed. Belatedly the FA issued the certificate while at the same time also passing a ban on women officiating at an FA or league match. Dunn persisted in her quest for official recognition, writing to the UK Minister for Sport, Denis Howell, and to Queen Elizabeth II. It was not until 1976 that she was officially allowed to take charge of men’s matches.

Dunn was briefly the first Chair of the Women’s Football Association in 1969 but less than a year later the FA requested that she resign in favour of a male referee, Pat Gwynne. Nevertheless, Dunn went on to referee an international match that year. In 1971 Pat Dunn travelled to the unofficial Women's World Cup in Mexico as the team's trainer.

== Later life ==
Pat continued to referee football for about ten years after 1976, before she gave it up in favour of umpiring cricket. She died in Dorchester in 1999.
