= Pierre Geoffroy =

French manager

Personal information
- Date of birth: 27 February 1939
- Place of birth: Reims, France
- Date of death: October 14, 1994 (aged 55)

Managerial career
- Years: Team
- 1968-1980: Reims
- 1971-1978: France

Pierre Geoffroy (September 5, 1939 – October 14, 1994) was a French sports journalist and coach.

== Biography ==
Pierre Geoffroy was a sports journalist for L'Union, who placed an advertisement in July 1968, looking for female football players to organize a football match as part of the newspaper fair. This section led to formation of Stade de Reims Féminines. He was the first France women's national football team coach in the first FIFA sanctioned women's international against the Netherlands on April 17, 1971. He coached France at the 1971 Women's World Cup.

== Personal life ==
Geoffroy was married to French footballer Maryse Lesieur.
