= Marie-Bernadette Thomas =

French association football player (born 1955)

Personal information
- Date of birth: 13 December 1955 (age 70)

Senior career*
Years	Team	Apps	(Gls)
- Reims

International career
1971-1978	France	16	(0)
- * Club domestic league appearances and goals

Marie-Bernadette Thomas (born 1955) is a French former footballer who played as a defender for Stade de Reims of the Division 1 Féminine. Thomas represented France in the first FIFA-sanctioned women's international, against the Netherlands.
