= Annette Frederiksen =

Danish association football player (1954 - 2022)

Personal information
- Date of birth: 10 December 1954
- Date of death: 2 January 2022 (aged 67)
- Position: Defender

Senior career*
Years	Team	Apps	(Gls)
- Kolding B
- Ribe BK

International career
1974-1978	Denmark	9	(3)
Medal record
Women's football
Women's World Cup
Gold medal – first place	1971 Mexico	Team
- * Club domestic league appearances and goals

Annette Frederiksen (born 10 December 1954 – 2 January 2022) was a Danish footballer who played as a defender for Kolding BK. Frederiksen represented Denmark at the unofficial 1971 Women's World Cup.

== International career ==
Frederiksen played nine international matches and scored three times for the Denmark women's national football team.

== Honours ==
National team

- 1971 Women's World Cup
