= Jocelyne Ratignier =

French footballer (born 1954)

Personal information
- Date of birth: 4 July 1954 (age 72)
- Place of birth: Belleville-sur-Saône, France
- Position: Forward

Senior career*
Years	Team	Apps	(Gls)
1968-1974	Reims		

International career
1971-1972	France	3	(3)
- * Club domestic league appearances and goals

Jocelyne Ratignier is a French football player who played as a forward for French club Stade de Reims of the Division 1 Féminine. Ratignier represented France in the first FIFA-sanctioned women's international against the Netherlands, Ratignier scored a hat-trick in that game.

== Literature ==
- Gaillard, Claire (2019). La grande histoire des Bleues. Dans les coulisses de l'équipe de France féminine. Paris, France: Hachette. ISBN 978-2-0170-4705-6.
