= Wilma Seghetti =

Italian football player (born 1956)

Personal information
- Date of birth: 7 May 1956 (age 70)
- Position: Goalkeeper

Senior career*
Years	Team	Apps	(Gls)
1970-1971	Olimpia Verona		
1972-1973	UCF Padova		
1974-1977	Valdobbiadene		

International career
1971	Italy		
- * Club domestic league appearances and goals

Wilma Seghetti (born 7 May 1956) is an Italian footballer who played as a goalkeeper for Cagliari.

Wilma Seghetti represented Italy at the 1971 Women's World Cup.
