= Betty Goret =

French association football player

Personal information
- Date of birth: 19 July 1949 (age 77)
- Place of birth: Sinceny, France
- Position: Defender

Senior career*
| Years | Team | Apps | (Gls) |
| 1971-1975 | Reims | | |

International career
| 1971-1973 | France | 3 | (0) |
- * Club domestic league appearances and goals

Betty Goret (born 19 July 1949) is a French football player who played as Defender for French club Stade de Reims of the Division 1 Féminine and the France national team.

== International career ==
Goret represented France in the first FIFA sanctioned women's international against the Netherlands on April 17, 1971.

== Honours ==
Reims

- Division 1 Féminine: 1974-1975
