= Susanne Erlandsson =

Swedish footballer

Personal information
- Position: Midfielder

Senior career*
Years	Team	Apps	(Gls)
- IS Halmia

International career
	Sweden	13	(3)
- * Club domestic league appearances and goals

Susanne Erlandsson is a retired Swedish footballer who played for IS Halmia and the Sweden women's national football team.

After retirement, Erlandsson became the first woman to be on the board of the Swedish Football Association.

== International career ==
Erlandsson made her debut for Sweden against Finland in 0–0 draw in 1973.
