= Elena Schiavo =

Italian footballer (born 1948)

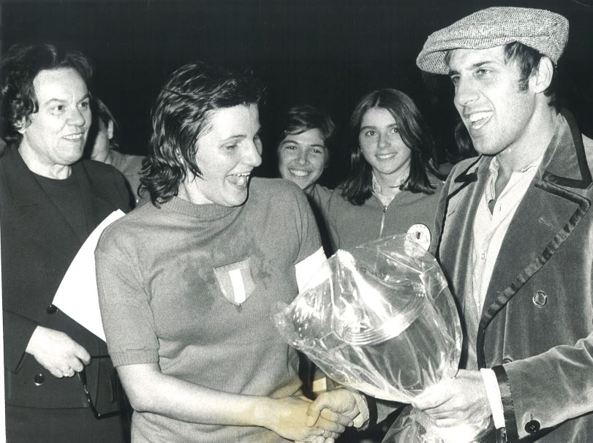
- Schiavo (left), captain of the women's national team, being given an award by Adriano Celentano in 1974

Personal information
- Date of birth: 14 January 1948 (age 78)
- Place of birth: Mereto di Tomba, Italy

Senior career*
Years	Team	Apps	(Gls)
1971	Real Torino		

International career
1969-1979	Italy		
- * Club domestic league appearances and goals

Elena Schiavo is an Italian footballer who played as a midfielder for the Italy women's national football team. She was part of the team at the 1971 Women's World Cup. In 2023, Schiavo appeared in the documentary Copa 71 to discuss her participation in the 1971 Women's world cup.
