= Carol Wilson (footballer) =

English footballer (born 1952)

Personal information
- Date of birth: June 1952 (age 74)

International career
Years	Team	Apps	(Gls)
1971	England	4	(0)

Carol Wilson (born June 1952) is a British former amateur footballer. She captained an unofficial England women's national football team — calling themselves the "British Independents", now known as the "Lost Lionesses" — in 1971, including at the 1971 Women's World Cup in Mexico.

== Early life ==
Carol Wilson grew up in Newcastle, England. Her father had played for Gateshead A.F.C. Youth, and fostered her interest in football: he encouraged her to walk as a child by kicking a football down the lane, and passed with her on the sidelines of Sunday league games they attended. She had informally played football with neighbour boys in back lanes from about the age of five, but would hide if other people came by as they mocked her for joining in. When she was eight, the family moved to a house that was next to a field, and she would practice on it with her father. A poor family, they would stand outside St James' Park to listen to the crowd when Newcastle United played, as they could never afford to go in. After going to the 1971 Women's World Cup, Wilson was invited to a reception with Newcastle United and took her father. With girls disallowed from playing football, she could not play in school but maintained her interest as she grew up. She joined the Women's Royal Air Force (WRAF) at the age of seventeen, as a physical training instructor.

== Career ==
At the age of eighteen, in the RAF, Wilson would spend lunch playing five-a-side football with male colleagues, and they often had the courts to themselves; a girls' football team played next to them one time, with a scout watching that game. The scout instead took interest in Wilson, and afterwards asked a senior officer to speak with her. She was invited to trial in Luton, then to join Harry Batt's team in the Sunday league, and, not long afterwards, to join an unofficial England squad being put together to play FIEFF 1971 Women's World Cup qualifiers in Sicily and, if successful, the tournament finals in Mexico. Wilson was granted leave from the Ministry of Defence to play, but told she could not tell people her role and had to pretend to be a teacher from Liverpool.

She captained the side for all of her known international caps, starting with the qualifiers: based on her RAF experience, Batt had asked Wilson to help with the team's fitness training and to be captain. She has said she thinks he did this after another player, also from the RAF, lost a finger during practice. Still eighteen at the time, Wilson remains the youngest person to captain a team that represented England internationally, though her unauthorised team has never been officially recognised. The team did well, though only qualified by default; Wilson was approached by an Italian club side, possibly Juventus, to sign for them, but had to refuse due to her military responsibilities. Nineteen by the time of the finals, she has said that the team knew the Football Association (FA) would not accept the team, and they had to get private sponsorship to travel to Mexico, which they did. She says her RAF colleagues were uninterested, which she puts down to them also working with Billy Steele, a rugby union player for Britain. Her parents also knew she was going, but she did not tell other people or friends, due to the perception of football at the time.

She recalls the response to the team in Mexico to be like that received by The Beatles in the United States during Beatlemania; crowds greeted them at the airport, supporters threw gifts at the team bus, and, when they left, were told they had won the hearts of Mexican people. The team's first game was against Argentina, who played viciously, and Wilson injured her foot but played on; she would play in the next game, too. The attendance for the Mexico vs England game at the Estadio Azteca was reported as around 90,000. It was more violent than the first match, with one player reporting the score line as "Mexico 4 – [England] 1 broken leg, 1 broken foot, 3 strained ligaments, 1 cartilage, 1 badly bruised shoulder & various other bruises, cuts, bumps and knocks"; the broken foot was Wilson's, though from the Argentina game. She and seven other members of the team went to hospital and, due to the altitude, most of the team were treated with oxygen after the match. The Mexican fans still adored them, and the Mexican team held a farewell party and formed a "guard of honour" as Wilson and Yvonne Farr returned to the hotel with their legs in plaster.

Ultimately, the England team came sixth of six in the finals. Their team was the only non-professional side, all under 24 and mostly teenagers, and, due to the injuries, featured some Mexican substitutes in their last, hastily arranged, play-off match (one of whom, Cecilia Gallegos, would play for England again). The British press were negative about the competition, both England's defeat and the injuries sustained, arguing that women should not play football. After some time, a local Luton paper did report on the affection Mexico held for the girls, though the spread did focus on them as female objects of desire and mocked the concept of "a female Arsenal".

The Women's Football Association (WFA) did not support professionalism of women's football, nor did they want manager Harry Batt to take his scouted teams to the World Cup, blacklisting his family and teams; with this, the FA ban on women still in place, and her new husband making her feel humiliated for playing, Wilson did not continue to play and did not talk about football again for years. She later admitted that she would have liked to play professionally abroad or for England again. The WFA were in the process of establishing a formal England women's team during 1971, which would debut the following year.

== Later life ==
Wilson went on to work in logistics for Wincanton plc. She and her 1971 teammates held a reunion in 2019 and started a petition to have their team officially recognised by the FA.
