= Liliana Mammina =

Italian footballer (born 1958)

Personal information
- Full name: Rosalia Mammina
- Date of birth: 3 January 1958 (age 68)
- Position: Winger

International career
Years	Team	Apps	(Gls)
1971-1978	Italy	15	(8)

Liliana Mammina is an Italian footballer who played as a midfielder for the Italy women's national football team. She was part of the team at the 1971 Women's World Cup.

== International career ==
Liliana Mammina represented Italy 15 times and scored 8 goals.
