= Armelle Binard =

French footballer (born 1953)

Personal information
- Date of birth: 9 January 1953
- Place of birth: Elbeuf, France
- Height: 1.53 m (5 ft 0 in)
- Position: Forward

Senior career*
Years	Team	Apps	(Gls)
1971-1976	FC Rouen		
1976-1985	Reims		
1985-1986	PSG		

International career
1972-1978	France	13	(3)
- * Club domestic league appearances and goals

Armelle Binard (born 9 January 1953) is a French former professional footballer who played as a midfielder for PSG.

== Career ==
Armelle Binard first appeared for France at the 1971 Women's World Cup. She represented France in 13 matches, and scored three goals.
