= Paolo Borelli =

Italian former professional footballer

Personal information
- Date of birth: February 22, 1958 (age 68)
- Place of birth: Albano Laziale, Italy
- Height: 1.70 m (5 ft 7 in)
- Position: Midfielder

Senior career*
Years	Team	Apps	(Gls)
1975–1979	Roma	14	(0)
1979–1980	Catanzaro	16	(0)
1980	Pescara	0	(0)
1980–1981	Parma	26	(0)
1981–1982	Spezia	11	(0)
1982–1983	Banco di Roma	27	(3)
- * Club domestic league appearances and goals

Paolo Borelli (born February 22, 1958, in Albano Laziale) is an Italian former professional footballer who played as a midfielder.

He played for 2 seasons (30 games, no goals) in Serie A for Roma and Catanzaro.
