= Colette Guyard =

French footballer (born 1952)

Personal information
- Date of birth: 24 October 1952 (age 74)
- Place of birth: Sézanne, France
- Position: Defender

Senior career*
Years	Team	Apps	(Gls)
1971-1974	Reims		
1978-1979	Saint-Memmie		

International career
1971-1973	France	5	(0)
- * Club domestic league appearances and goals

Colette Guyard (born 24 October 1952) is a French football player who played as defender for French club Stade de Reims of the Division 1 Féminine.

== International career ==
Guyard represented France in the first FIFA sanctioned women's international against the Netherlands on April 17, 1971.
