= Marie-Christine Tschopp =

French footballer (born 1951)

Personal information
- Date of birth: 25 January 1951 (age 75)
- Position: Midfielder

Senior career*
Years	Team	Apps	(Gls)
1974–1975	Reims		

International career
1971–1973	France	6	(2)
- * Club domestic league appearances and goals

Marie-Christine Tschopp (born 25 January 1951) is a French football player who played as midfielder for French club Stade de Reims of the Division 1 Féminine.
