= Carlo Jungbluth =

Luxembourgish footballer

Personal information
- Date of birth: 15 October 1958 (age 68)
- Position: Defender

Senior career*
Years	Team	Apps	(Gls)
1978–1982	Jeunesse Esch		
c.1988–1989	CS Pétange		

International career
1980	Luxembourg	5	(0)
- * Club domestic league appearances and goals

Carlo Jungbluth (born 15 October 1958) is a retired Luxembourgish football defender.
