= Evelina Cabrera =

Argentine football coach and manager

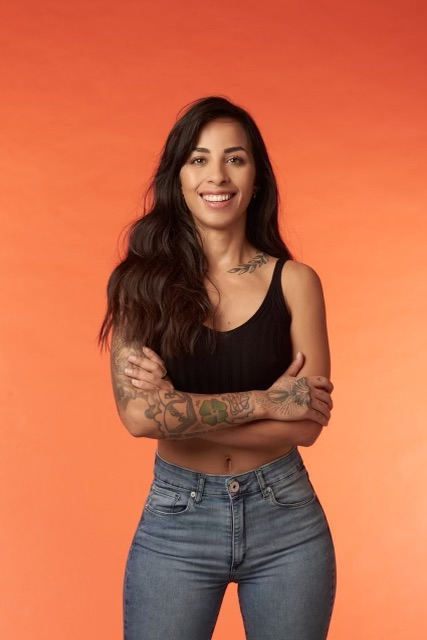

Personal information
- Full name: María Evelina Cabrera
- Date of birth: 26 September 1986 (age 40)
- Place of birth: Buenos Aires, Argentina
- Height: 1.58 m (5 ft 2 in)

Managerial career
- Years: Team
- 2021: Pachuca Reserves and Academy

Evelina Cabrera (San Fernando, September 26, 1986) is an Argentine soccer coach, sports coach, writer, and consultant. She was selected by the BBC as one of the 100 most influential and inspiring women in the world in 2020. In November 2022, she was chosen as Jury for the UNESCO Madanjeet Singh Prize for the Promotion of Tolerance and Non-Violence.

She has been a speaker at the United Nations, W20, UNESCO, The Economist, among others.

== Life ==
Cabrera was born in 1986 in the city of San Fernando. She began her career as an amateur soccer player at the age of twenty-one with Club Atlético Platense.

Due to a health condition, in 2012 she had to stop playing but chose to stay connected to sports in another role: as a coach. Her first experience was with Club Atlético Nueva Chicago, where she became part of the coaching staff.

She coached the Argentine national team in the Homeless World Cup, an annual soccer tournament for teams of homeless people from different countries, organized in Mexico City in October 2012.

In 2013, while working as a public official in the municipality of Tigre, she co-founded the Argentine Women's Football Association (AFFAR) alongside fellow players and coaches.

In 2014, her coaching duo presented a women's soccer project at Defensores de Florida Club in Vicente López, while Cabrera also began a new role in Tigre managing special activities planning in one of the sports centers in the city's most vulnerable neighborhoods.

She finished the year graduating as a professional soccer coach at the Argentine Football Coaches Association (ATFA) and as an ontological coach.

In 2015, she continued her work at Defensores de Florida and AFFAR started gaining visibility, receiving support from the Argentine Sports Confederation (CAD) and the National Sports Secretariat, expanding into different provinces across the country.

In 2016, with her coaching partner, she managed the first division women's futsal team at Villa La Ñata Club. She launched her EVCA Women's Soccer School with the support of the Boca Social Foundation. She also coached the first women's futsal team presented by the Sanitation Workers’ Union, leading them to win the national championship in their debut. She created the first women's blind soccer team in Buenos Aires and became one of the coaches for Las Luciérnagas, the national women's blind soccer team.

In 2016, Cabrera highlighted her greatest gratitude was ensuring AFFAR joined the UN's “Unite Latin America” campaign to end gender-based violence, and organizing the “Unite Cup” alongside the UN, Avon Foundation, and the Buenos Aires City Government.

In March 2017, The Economist recognized her work and development in women's soccer, inviting her to the Argentina Summit 2017, where she was named a “ChangeMaker.” She also became the first woman in Argentina to sign with Nike in the soccer division, paving the way for other female players.

She continued coaching Las Romanas, the women's blind soccer team she had helped form, while developing her EVCA school. In August, she represented Argentina in Spain at the event “Soccer for Equality”, presenting her work with AFFAR. She was featured on the cover of La Nación magazine and was named one of the 50 most influential people of 2017.

In 2018, she was invited to represent Argentina and AFFAR at the United Nations headquarters in New York during the ECOSOC Youth Forum, where she spoke at the SDG Media Zone and was selected as one of only five people to close the forum. She received recognition from UN Deputy Secretary-General Amina J. Mohammed for both her speech and her life example.

She appeared in the film No llores por mí, Inglaterra (“Don’t Cry for Me, England”), directed by Néstor Montalbano, which included actors and soccer personalities.

She trained incarcerated women at Penal 47 in San Martín. She also began working as futsal manager for Club Atlas and was the closing speaker at the W20 Summit (part of the G20) in Argentina, becoming the youngest keynote speaker of the event.

In 2019, she developed the Gender Department at Boca Juniors. She contributed a story titled Del 86 to the book Pelota de Papel 3. She spoke at BAPA+40, the second United Nations High-Level Conference on South-South Cooperation. She was an ambassador for the Danone Nations Cup, where girls were included for the first time. In December, AFFAR officially joined the Argentine Football Association (AFA).

She was named patron of the Valor Project, which supports grassroots organizations in southern Buenos Aires in partnership with Quilmes Brewery & Malting Company.

That same year, she was once again selected by BBC News as one of the 100 most influential and inspiring women in the world.

In March 2021, she began working as a mentor in the Human Development Department at Pachuca Football Club (Mexico) and as an assistant coach for the U-20 team, a role she held until December of that year.

In June 2021, she was appointed Ambassador for Equity in Sports by the Organization of American States (OAS).

In November 2021, she released her third book, Liderate, dedicated to women entrepreneurs.

In November 2022, she was chosen as President of the Jury of the UNESCO Madanjeet Singh Prize for the Promotion of Tolerance and Non-Violence, awarded biennially in France since 1996 in connection with the UN's Year for Tolerance and the 125th anniversary of Mahatma Gandhi’s birth.

In April 2024, she joined the Board of Directors of America Scores in the United States and Canada.

In June 2024, Evelina Cabrera married Dr. Justin Dunnavant, archaeologist, professor, and founder of the Society of Black Archaeologists.

In July 2025, she inaugurated a women's sewing center in Mali, Africa, called The Chicas. At the same time, she launched her podcast Pregunta The Chicas to give visibility to women from different fields.

=== Published books ===
- 2020 – Alta Negra (Ediciones B)
- 2021 – Juana, la futbolista
- 2022 – Liderate (Liberate)
