= Alicia Vargas =

Mexican footballer (born 1954)

Alicia "La Pelé" Vargas
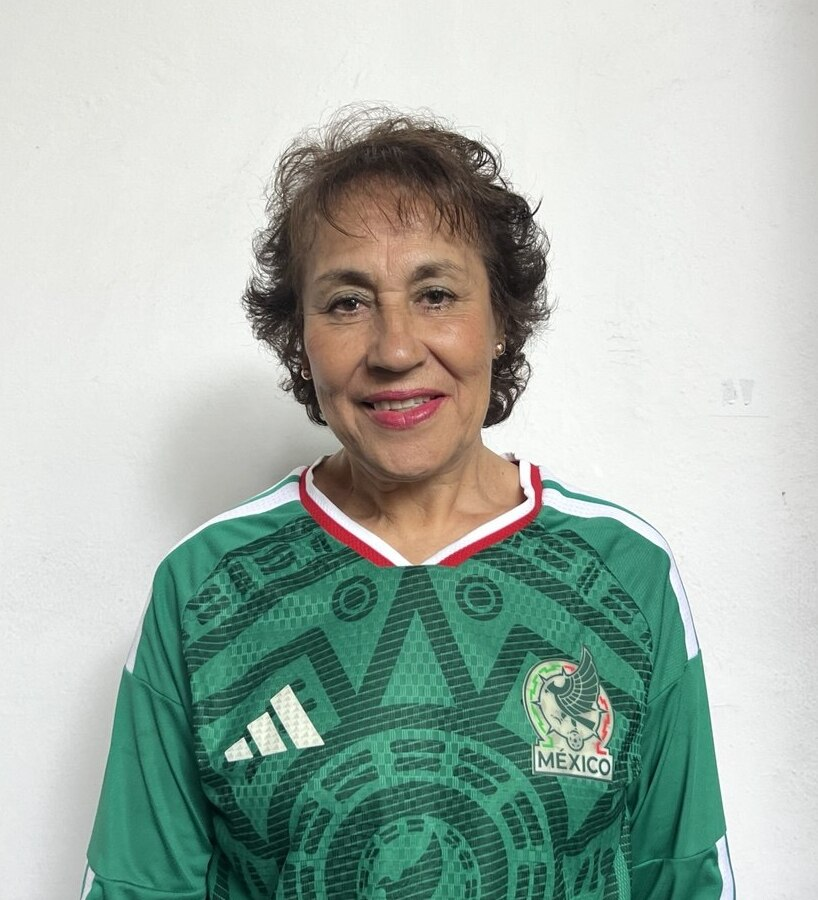
- Vargas in 2026

Personal information
- Date of birth: 1954 (age 71–72)
- Positions: Midfielder; forward

International career
Years	Team	Apps	(Gls)
- Mexico

Alicia "La Pelé" Vargas (born 1954) is a Mexican former footballer who played for the Mexico national team in the first two Women's World Cups, organised by the International European Federation of Women's Soccer, in 1970 and 1971. In 1999 she was named third best woman of the Century by CONCACAF, jointly with Julie Foudy.

== Career ==
Vargas played football in the streets as a youth, with her brothers and other boys. Despite opposition from her parents, she continued to play and debuted aged 14 at the Guadalajara club, Mexico City. In 1970, aged 16, she played for the Mexico national team in the first women's World Cup in Italy. In the quarter-finals Vargas scored two of Mexico's nine goals, against Austria and the team won the game 9–0. Overall the team gained third place, winning 3–2 against England in the third place play off, and Vargas was offered a contract with Real Torino which she chose not to accept. It was around this time that Vargas gained the nickname "La Pelé", a reference to the highly regarded Brazilian player known as Pelé.

In 1971 Vargas played again in the Women's World Cup, this time in Mexico. The team made it to the finals but lost 3–0 to Denmark. The team's performance may have been affected by a dispute over pay, in which they asked for 1 million pesos to split between the team and their coaches, 20 people in total. This request was refused and the team were allegedly denied the opportunity to practice in the week before the final as a result. Vargas was once again offered a contract with Real Torino at this time, which she again declined. After the 1971 Cup the team toured around Mexico, but did not receive a salary. After a short time Vargas returned to play for Guadalajara.

Later, Vargas took courses to become a physical trainer and taught in the Azcapotzalco mayor's sports hall for 28 years before retirement.
