= Sergey Goryunov =

Soviet footballer and Russian coach

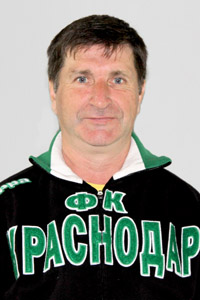

Personal information
- Full name: Sergey Alexandrovich Goryunov
- Date of birth: 29 April 1958 (age 68)
- Height: 1.70 m (5 ft 7 in)
- Positions: Defender; midfielder

Senior career*
Years	Team	Apps	(Gls)
1976–1979	FC Druzhba Maykop	64	(11)
1980–1988	FC Kuban Krasnodar	255	(12)
1989–1991	FC Druzhba Maykop	99	(6)
1991	FC Khimik Belorechensk	12	(0)
1992–1993	FC Izumrud Timashyovsk (amateur)		
1994–1996	FC Lada-Yug Krasnodar		

Managerial career
- 1992: FC Izumrud Timashyovsk (assistant)
- 1998: FC Neftyanik Kubani Goryachy Klyuch
- 2009–2010: FC Krasnodar (assistant)
- 2014: FC Afips Afipsky (assistant)
- 2014–2015: FC Afips Afipsky (director of sports)
- * Club domestic league appearances and goals

Sergey Alexandrovich Goryunov (Russian: Серге́й Александрович Горюнов; born 29 April 1958) is a professional association football coach from Russia and a former Soviet player.
