= Jocelyne Henry =

French footballer (1954-2008)

Personal information
- Full name: Jocelyne Jeannine Henry
- Date of birth: 9 April 1954
- Place of birth: Vierzon, France
- Date of death: 4 March 2008 (aged 53)
- Position: Forward

Senior career*
Years	Team	Apps	(Gls)
1971-1972	Reims		

International career
1971-1972	France	3	(1)
- * Club domestic league appearances and goals

Jocelyne Henry (April 9, 1954 – March 4, 2008) was a French footballer who played as a forward for Reims and the France national team. She represented France in the first FIFA sanctioned women's international against the Netherlands.

== International career ==
Henry represented France 3 times and scored 1 goal. Henry also participated in the 1971 Women's World Cup.
