= José Luis Russo =

Uruguayan footballer (1958–2026)

Personal information
- Full name: José Luis Russo Perrone
- Date of birth: 14 July 1958
- Place of birth: Montevideo, Uruguay
- Date of death: 10 February 2026 (aged 67)
- Height: 1.83 m (6 ft 0 in)
- Position: Defender

Youth career
- Urreta (five-a-side)
- La Rinconada (five-a-side)
- Chacabuco (five-a-side)
- Huracán Buceo

Senior career*
Years	Team	Apps	(Gls)
1975–1977	Huracán Buceo		
1978–1982	Defensor		
1983–1984	Deportes Tolima	69	(8)
1985	Atlético Bucaramanga		
1986	Peñarol	6	(0)
1987	Independiente Medellín		
1988	Palmeiras		
1988–1989	Deportes Iquique	24	(1)
1990	Cerro		
1991–1993	Huracán Buceo		

International career
1977	Uruguay U20	12	(0)
1979–1986	Uruguay	15	(0)
- * Club domestic league appearances and goals

José Luis Russo Perrone (14 July 1958 – 10 February 2026) was a Uruguayan footballer who played as a defender for clubs of Uruguay, Chile, Brazil and Colombia.

== Club career ==
Russo started his career at Huracán Buceo in 1975 but became known at Defensor after outplaying Peñarol's Fernando Morena in his debut. He later joined Peñarol in 1986 where he won the Uruguayan championship after Peñarol beat Nacional in the championship play-off. He later played in Colombia, Brazil and Chile.

== International career ==
He won 15 caps for Uruguay between 1979 and 1986 but did not make the 1986 World Cup squad.

== Coaching career ==
Following his retirement, Russo coached children in Valencia, Spain, and Miami, United States.

== Personal life and death ==
Russo was born in Montevideo, Uruguay. He was nicknamed Pete, a short form of Chupete (Dummy), an inherited nickname from his grandfather.

Russo died on 10 February 2026, at the age of 67.
