= Maurizia Ciceri =

Italian association football player

Personal information
- Date of birth: September 26, 1953 (age 73)
- Position: Forward

Team information
- Current team: Lazio

Maurizia Ciceri (born September 26, 1953) is an Italian former professional footballer who played as a forward.

== Honours ==
=== Italy ===
- 1969 European Competition for Women's Football
