= Jean Royer de Prade =

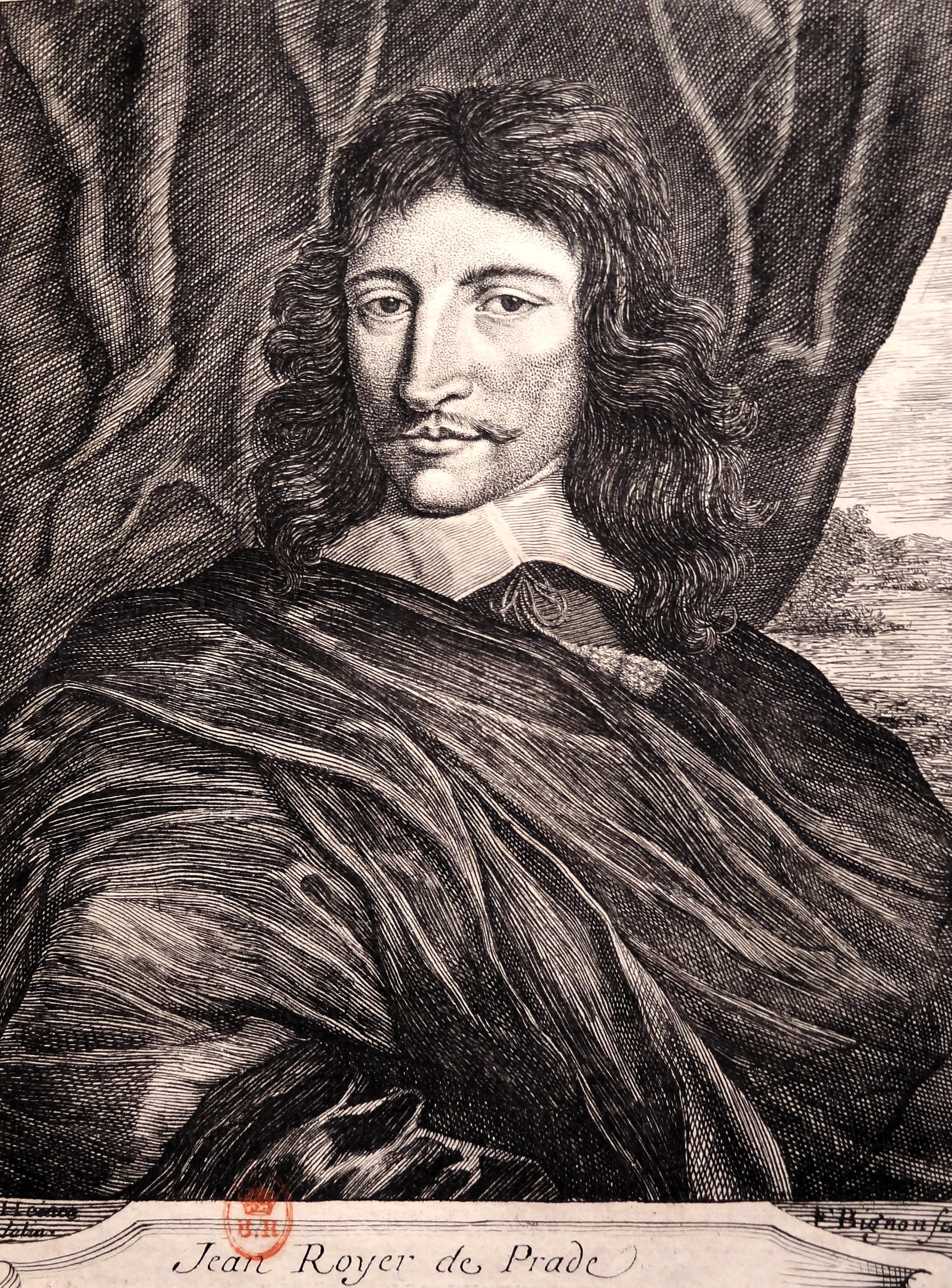
Jean Royer de Prade

Jean Royer de Prade (born c. 1624) was a French man of letters, known particularly as a historian, and for his Discours du tabac. He also wrote dramas. He was a good friend of Cyrano de Bergerac.

== Works ==
- Annibal (1649), drama
- La victime d'estat ou La mort de Plautius Silvanus préteur romain (1649), tragedy
- Arsace, Roy de Parthes (1666), tragedy
- Discours du tabac, ou il est traité particulièrement du tabac en poudre (1671), under the pseudonym Edme Baillard
- Histoire d'Allemagne (1677)
