= FIEFF =

European administrative body for women's association football

The Federation of Independent European Female Football (French: Fédération Internationale Européenne de Football Féminine, also referred to by its acronym FIEFF) was an administrative body for women's association football in Europe and later globally. Privately funded by the backers of professional Italian women's clubs, FIEFF organised Italian-based tournaments in 1969 and 1970, then a World Cup hosted in Mexico in 1971. The tournaments attracted sponsors including Martini & Rossi and were a commercial success. The governing body of male football in Europe, Union des Associations Européennes de Football (UEFA), took a hostile approach to FIEFF's activities and exerted pressure on the national associations to curb what they saw as unaffiliated women's football. In 1969 UEFA had issued an edict instructing its member associations to take control of women's football within their territories.

== History ==
In the late 1960s a privately funded governing body, Fédération Internationale Européenne de Football Féminine (FIEFF), was put together by the backers of the professional Italian women's football league. In 1969 they approached Harry Batt, manager of Chiltern Valley Ladies, to form an England select team for the first Coppa Europa per Nazioni competition in northern Italy that November. With accommodation and rail travel provided by sponsors Martini & Rossi, In the semi-final of the four nation tournament Batt's England team met Denmark (represented by the BK Femina club) at Aosta Valley in the north-west corner of Italy. Despite a hat-trick from captain Sue Lopez, the English were beaten 4–3. The following day at the Stadio Comunale in Turin, a 10,000 crowd saw England beat France 2–0 in the third place play-off, then Femina lose 3–1 to the host country in the final. Following the commercial success of their Coppa Europa per Nazioni, FIEFF organised the 1971 Women's World Cup on a much larger scale in Mexico.

The governing body of male football in Europe Union des Associations Européennes de Football (UEFA) took an extremely dim view of FIEFF's activities and exerted pressure on the national associations to curb what they saw as unaffiliated women's football. The English president of Fédération Internationale de Football Association (FIFA), Sir Stanley Rous, was said to be "investigating" the World Cup in Mexico. In December 1970 the English Women's Football Association (WFA) had rejected FIEFF's invitation to the 1971 Mexico tournament, ostensibly because "it was too short notice." On the players' return they were fined or banned from domestic football, for appearing in "unsanctioned" competition. Southampton's Louise Cross was suspended for three months. Another victim was 14-year-old outside-right prodigy Gillian Sayell, a teammate of Wendy Owen at Thame Ladies. Owen said: "Going to Mexico was a fantastic, once-in-a-lifetime experience, however (the matches were played in front of thousands of fanatical supporters, with the final staged at the Aztec Stadium), so I am sure that she felt that it was worth it." Although Batt had called his team the English Independents instead of England, he was banned sine die by the WFA. The whole East Midlands Ladies Alliance, of which Chiltern Valley were the champions, was excommunicated. According to Sue Lopez, the WFA formed their own national team partly in order to "negate" the exploits of Harry Batt's England XI. A proposed FIEFF World Cup in Francoist Spain in 1972 was cancelled under pressure from the Royal Spanish Football Federation.

== Bibliography ==
- Breuil, Xavier (2011). Histoire du football féminin en Europe. Paris: Nouveau Monde. ISBN 978-2-84736-622-8.
- Fan, Hong; Mangan, J. A. (2003). Soccer, Women, Sexual Liberation: Kicking Off a New Era. Taylor & Francis. ISBN 9780714684086 – via Google Books.
- Lopez, Sue (1997). Women on the Ball: A Guide to Women's Football. London: Scarlet Press. ISBN 1-85727-016-9.
- Owen, Wendy (2005). Kicking Against Tradition: A Career in Women's Football. Tempus. ISBN 0752434276.
- Williams, Jean (2003). A game for rough girls?: a history of women's football in Britain. Routledge. ISBN 0-415-26338-7.
