= Ghislaine Royer-Souef =

French footballer (born 1953)

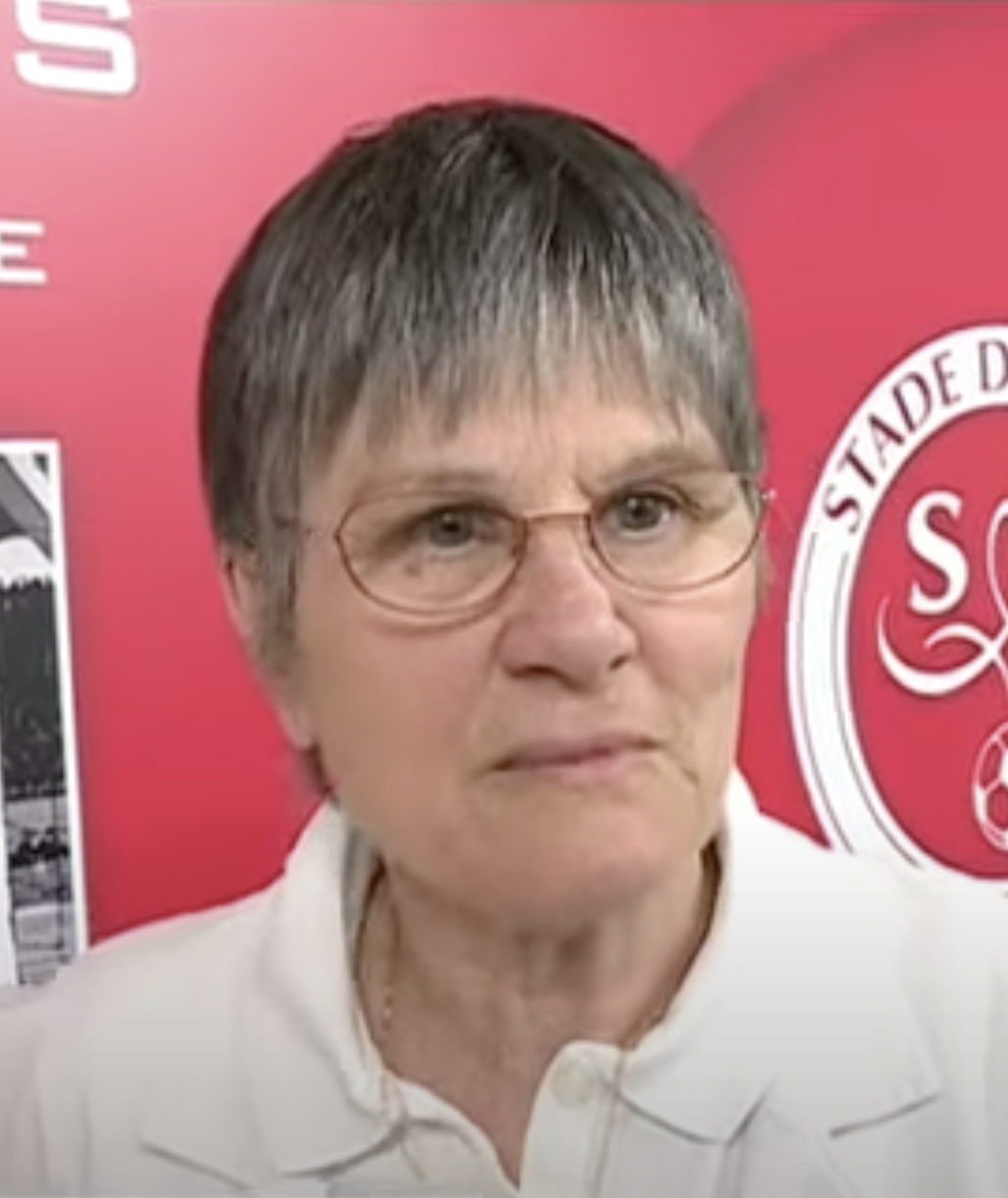

Personal information
- Date of birth: 15 January 1953 (age 73)
- Place of birth: Reims, France
- Position: Goalkeeper

Senior career*
Years	Team	Apps	(Gls)
1968-1979	Reims		

International career
1971-1976	France	7	(0)
- * Club domestic league appearances and goals

Ghislaine Royer-Souef (born January 15, 1953) is a French association football player. She spent her career at the Stade de Reims French women's football team and later took part in the French national female team. She played the position of goalkeeper throughout her career. Ghislaine Poyer-Souef is considered one of the pioneers of women's football as she was part of the formation of the first national French women's football team.

== Football career ==
Ghislaine Royer-Souef's interest in football started at an early age. She began as her brother's ballgirl, and eventually she went on to play on mixed teams at her local football field. At the age of 15, after being shown an advertisement looking for female football players, Ghislaine began her football career at the Stade de Reims in the Division 1 Féminine football league. She was part of the main roster from June 1968 - June 1979. During this time, Ghislaine and her team won three French championship cups. However, in her early career at the Stade de Reims, there was no licensed female football federation. Upon joining the Italian female football federation (F.I.E.F.), the French Football Federation (FFF) realized the potential benefit of implementing a female league, thus creating one. Ghislaine's team was then recognized by the FFF and began playing games all around the world. Ghislaine went on to be one of the first team players on the French women's national team, being selected to play 7 times between 1971 and 1976. Ghislaine was never paid a salary for her involvement in any of the teams she took part of.

== Influence ==
In addition to being one of the pioneers of women's football, Ghislaine's impact can be seen even to this day. While she did not have a specific feminist agenda in introducing France to women's football, she wanted women to be able to enjoy what they have a passion for regardless of gender barriers. She was even criticized by journalists for giving up her duties around the house to play football, but she would not let that affect her and would just play. On April 25, 2018, the French film, Comme des Garçons, or "Let the Girls Play" was released. This film reimagines women's journey in creating a gender-free sports association, specifically football in France.
