= Elba Selva =

Argentine footballer (born 1945)

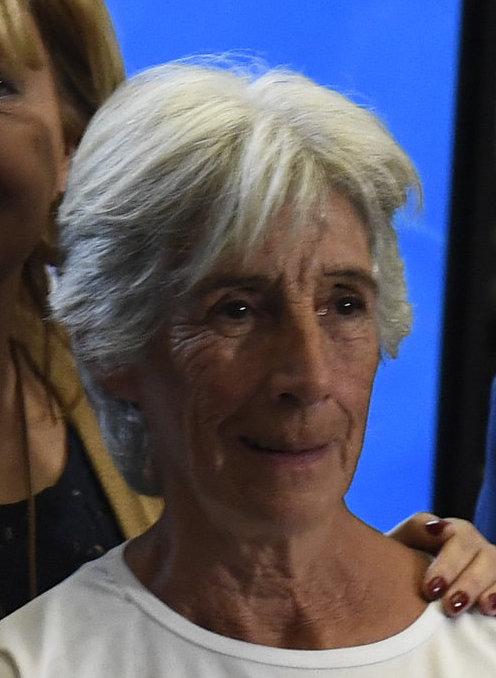

Personal information
- Date of birth: 14 January 1945 (age 81)
- Place of birth: Villa Riachuelo, Argentina
- Position: Midfielder

International career
Years	Team	Apps	(Gls)
1971	Argentina (unofficial team)	4	(4)

Elba Selva (14 January 1945) is an Argentine footballer who represented Argentina at the 1971 Women's World Cup.
