= 1970 Women's World Cup =

Martini & Rossi Cup

Tournament details
- Host country: Italy
- Dates: 6–15 July
- Teams: 7
- Venues: 7 (in 7 host cities)

Final positions
- Champions: Denmark
- Runners-up: Italy
- Third place: Mexico
- Fourth place: England

Tournament statistics
- Matches played: 8
- Goals scored: 37 (4.63 per match)
- Top scorer(s): (Denmark) Kirsten Evers (Mexico) Alicia Vargas (5 goals each)

The 1970 Women's World Cup (Italian: Coppa del Mondo; sponsored name Martini & Rossi Cup) was an association football tournament organised by the Federation of Independent European Female Football (FIEFF) in Italy in July 1970. It featured women's teams from seven countries and is the first known tournament to be named as a women's football World Cup.

Matches were played in Genoa, Bologna, Milan, Bari, Salerno, Naples, and the third-place playoff and final were both in Turin.

The tournament was won by Denmark, represented by Boldklubben Femina.

== The tournament ==
Eight teams were scheduled to appear in the tournament. The first list of participants, published in February 1970, consisted of Argentina, Denmark, France, Italy, Brazil, Czechoslovakia, England, and the Soviet Union. This was changed in a later revision, with West Germany, Mexico, Austria and Switzerland replacing Argentina, France, Brazil and the Soviet Union in May 1970. Czechoslovakia would have been the only country from Europe's Eastern Bloc to compete, but the team withdrew because of visa issues.

The crowds for the tournament were "30,000-strong". Denmark won the tournament after beating Italy 2–0 in the final.

Teams were divided into the "northern" group (in Genoa, Bologna and Milan), and "southern" (Bari, Salerno, Naples) with the top teams meeting in the final.

The tournament did not involve FIFA, which had held the first men's World Cup in 1930 but did not hold any women's event until 1988. The host country's matches are considered official by the Italian Football Federation. The Italian women's league had been established in 1968.

Mexico, a losing semi-finalist 2–1 to Italy, were described as the "revelation" of the tournament.

=== Bracket ===
Quarter-finals
6 July — Genoa
England	5
West Germany	1
9 July — Bologna
Denmark	6
West Germany	1
6 July — Bari
Mexico	9
Austria	0
9 July — Salerno
Italy	2
Switzerland	1

Semi-finals
10 July — Milan
England	0
Denmark	2
11 July — Naples
Mexico	1
Italy	2

Final
15 July — Turin
Denmark	2
Italy	0
Third place
13 July — Turin
Mexico	3
England	2

=== Quarter-finals ===
6 July 1970

England	5-1	West Germany
Briggs 1', 9'; Stockley 25' (pen.); Cross 36'; Dolling 61'		Schmitz 49'

Stadio Luigi Ferraris, Genoa

6 July 1970

Mexico	9–0	Austria
Rubio 1', 31'; Vargas 4', 18', 47', 57'; Huerta 8'; Hernández 49', 61'

Stadio della Vittoria, Bari

Czechoslovakia withdrew due to visa issues, and so West Germany were given a second chance instead.

9 July 1970

Denmark	6–1	West Germany
Evers 8', 35', 69'; Christensen 9', 19'; E. Hansen 24'		Arzdorf 15'

Stadio Comunale, Bologna

9 July 1970

Italy	2–1	Switzerland
Mella 15'; Avon 68'		Ripamonti 40'

Stadio Donato Vestuti, Salerno
Referee: Santopietro (Italy)

=== Semi-finals ===
10 July 1970

Denmark	2–0	England
Evers 46', 70'

San Siro, Milan
Referee: Lojacono (Italy)

11 July 1970

Italy	2–1	Mexico
Schiavo 5', 40'		Mondo 48' (o.g.)

Stadio San Paolo, Naples

=== Third place play-off ===
13 July 1970

Mexico	3–2	England
Vargas 3'; Hernández 9'; Tovar 15'		Davies 24'; Stockey 55' (pen.)

Stadio Comunale, Turin
Attendance: 3000
Referee: Sicco (Italy)

=== Final ===
15 July 1970

Denmark	2–0	Italy
E. Hansen 18'; Ševčíková 68'

Stadio Comunale, Turin
Attendance: 40,000
Referee: Cosentina (Italy)

== Memorials ==
Tournament memorabilia was collected at an exhibition in Pessione di Chieri (Turin) from June to August 2019.

== Later tournaments ==
The tournament was followed by the 1971 Women's World Cup in Mexico, and the series of five Mundialito tournaments from 1981 to 1988 in Japan and Italy, before the 1988 FIFA Women's Invitation Tournament and 1991 FIFA Women's World Cup, both in China.

== See also ==
Tan cerca de las nubes ('So close to the clouds) is a 2023 documentary in Spanish about the Mexican squad that participated in the 1970 cup, as well as the 1971 one.

== Bibliography ==
- Barboni, Luca; Cecchi, Gabriele (1999). Annuario del calcio femminile 1999-2000 (in Italian). Fornacette (Pisa, Italy): Mariposa Editrice S.r.l. pp. 230–231.
