= 1969 European Competition for Women's Football =

1969 Coppa Europa per Nazioni

Tournament details
- Host country: Italy
- Dates: 1–2 November
- Teams: 4 (from 1 confederation)
- Venue: 3 (in 3 host cities)

Final positions
- Champions: Italy (1st title)
- Runners-up: Denmark
- Third place: England
- Fourth place: France

Tournament statistics
- Matches played: 4
- Goals scored: 14 (3.5 per match)
- Top scorer(s): Sue Lopez (4 goals)

The 1969 European Competition for Women's Football was a women's association football tournament contested by European nations. It took place in Italy from 1 to 2 November 1969, and was organised by the FICF (Federazione Italiana Calcio Femminile).

The tournament featured 4 teams, with games staged in Novara, Aosta and Turin. Considered unofficial because it was not run under the auspices of UEFA, it was a precursor to the UEFA Women's Championship. Italy won the tournament, beating Denmark 3–1 in the final.

== Knockout stage ==
Semi-finals
1 November – Novara
Italy	1
France	0
1 November – Aosta
Denmark	4
England	3

Final
2 November – Turin
Italy	3
Denmark	1
Third place
2 November – Turin
England	2
France	0

=== Semi-finals ===
1 November 1969

Italy	1–0	France
Giubertoni 27'	Report; FIGC Report (in Italian)

Novara
Referee: Marocco (Italy)

1 November 1969

Denmark	4–3	England
Ir. Christensen 13', 44'; Ševčíková 15'; L. Hansen 28'	Report	Lopez 8', 53', 61'

Aosta

=== Third place match ===
2 November 1969

England	2–0	France
Tungate 12'; Lopez 46'	Report

Turin
Referee: Sicco (Italy)

=== Final ===
2 November 1969

Italy	3–1	Denmark
Ciceri 12', 33'; Medri 30'	Report; FIGC Report (in Italian)	L. Hansen 8'

Turin
Attendance: 10,000
Referee: Cosentino (Italy)

== Winner ==
European Competition for Women's Football
1969 winners

Italy
First title

== Top goalscorers ==
4 goals

- (England) Sue Lopez

2 goals

- (Denmark) Irene Christensen
- (Denmark) Lone Hansen
- (Italy) Maurizia Ciceri

1 goals

- (Denmark) Maria Ševčíková
- (England) Sue Tungate
- (Italy) Aurora Giubertoni
- (Italy) Stefania Medri

== Final standings ==
Rank	Team
1st place, gold medalist(s)	Italy
2nd place, silver medalist(s)	Denmark
3rd place, bronze medalist(s)	England
4	France
