= Stade de Reims Féminines =

French women's association football team

Stade de Reims
- Full name: Stade de Reims Féminines
- Nicknames: Les rouges et blancs (The Red and Whites); Pionnières ambitieuses (ambitious pioneers)
- Founded: 1968; 58 years ago
- Ground: Stade Auguste-Delaune
- Capacity: 21,029
- President: Jean-Pierre Caillot
- Head coach: Mathieu Rufié
- League: Seconde Ligue
- 2025–26: Seconde Ligue, 9th of 12
- Website: https://www.stade-de-reims.com/equipe-d1f/
Home colours	Away colours

Stade de Reims Féminines (French pronunciation: [stad də ʁɛ̃s feminin]) or Stade de Reims Women is a French women's football club from Reims established in 1968 as FCF Reims (Football Club Féminin de Reims). In 1970 it became Stade de Reims's women's team, and four years later it was one of the twelve founding teams of the Division 1 Féminine, now known as the Première Ligue. It currently plays in the Seconde Ligue – the second tier of the French league system.

== History ==
Pierre Geoffroy helped found the club Stade de Reims Féminines.

Stade de Reims was one of the championship's leading teams during its first years, winning five titles between 1975 and 1982.

In 1973 Stade de Reims undertook a tour of Ireland, and as a result signed Anne O'Brien who played against them, making them the first non-Irish team to sign an Irish player.

The team subsequently declined throughout the 1980s, but is currently playing in Division 1 Féminine (D1F).

== Players ==
=== Current squad ===
As of 19 October 2025

Note: Flags indicate national team as defined under FIFA eligibility rules; some limited exceptions apply. Players may hold more than one non-FIFA nationality.

No.	Pos.	Nation	Player
1	GK	FRA	Clara Wibaut
2	DF	FRA	Mathilde Kack
4	DF	HAI	Jasmine Vilgrain
5	DF	FRA	Manale Hamdaoui
6	MF	FRA	Yasmine Ben Kaabia
7	FW	FRA	Cyrine Ben Rabah
8	MF	MAR	Inès Ou Mahi
9	FW	FRA	Maëva Maniouloux
10	MF	MAR	Lina Aich Sanchez
12	MF	FRA	Léna Mouzon

No.	Pos.	Nation	Player
14	DF	FRA	Lisa Nicot
15	FW	ALG	Shana Battouri
16	GK	CAN	Ambre Bouchard
17	MF	FRA	Thaïs Prépont
18	FW	ALG	Kahissa Saïdi
19	FW	FRA	Hanna'a Chamsoudine
20	FW	USA	Morgan White
21	DF	FRA	Léa Notel
23	DF	LUX	Vera Villegas
24	DF	ALG	Lana Smits
26	MF	FRA	Léa Bourgain
30	GK	FRA	Nell Poye

=== Former players ===
- (France) Élisabeth Dejean
- (France) Colette Guyard
- (France) Élisabeth Loisel
- (Republic of Ireland) Anne O'Brien
- (France) Michèle Monier
- (Scotland) Rose Reilly
- (Scotland) Edna Neillis
- (Ukraine) Tetyana Romanenko
- (France) Dominique Tedeschi
- (France) Marie-Christine Tschopp
- (France) Rachèle Vilarinho

== Current staff ==
As of 17 July 2024

Position	Name
Head coach	(France) Vacant
Assistant coach	(France) Amaury Messuwe
Goalkeeper coach	(France) Mamadou Bah
Réathlétisation	(France) Quentin Barette
Strength and Conditioning Coach	(France) François Dumanche
Doctor	(France) Coralie Parmentier
Assistant Doctor	(France) Léo Gillery
Kinesiologist	(France) Laurine Benamara
Video Analyst	(France) Maxime Droma

== Titles ==
- Division 1 Féminine
- Winners (5): 1975, 1976, 1977, 1980, 1982
