= 1971 Women's World Cup =

1971 Campeonato de Fútbol Femenil
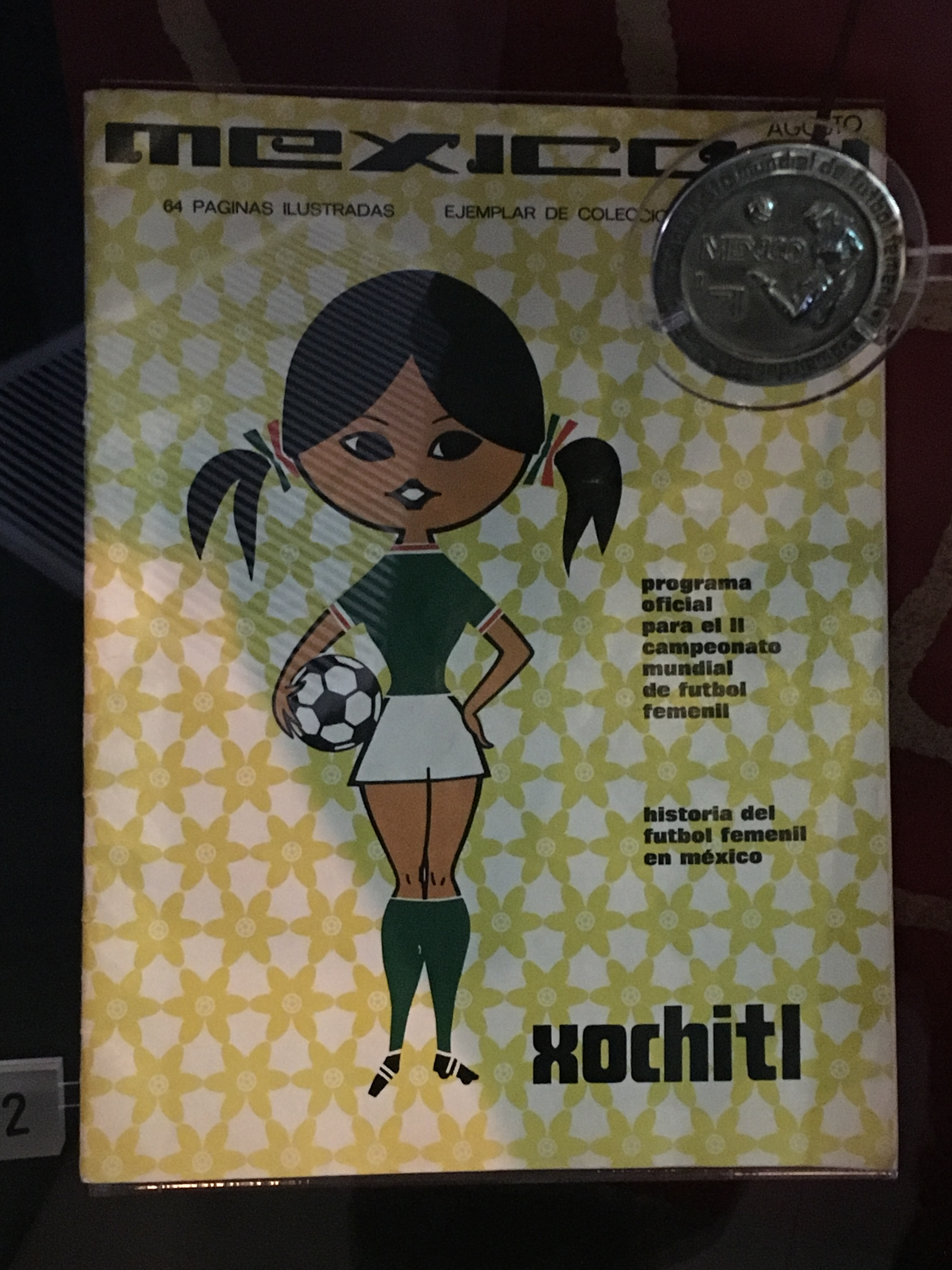
- Programme and participation medal from the tournament

Tournament details
- Host country: Mexico
- Dates: 15 August – 5 September
- Teams: 6 (finalists)
- Venues: 2 (in 2 host cities)

Final positions
- Champions: Denmark
- Runners-up: Mexico
- Third place: Italy
- Fourth place: Argentina

Tournament statistics
- Matches played: 11
- Goals scored: 39 (3.55 per match)
- Top scorer(s): (Denmark) Lis Lene Nielsen (5 goals)

The 1971 Women's World Cup (Spanish: 1971 Campeonato de Fútbol Femenil) was an association football tournament for women's national teams organized by the Federation of Independent European Female Football (FIEFF). The tournament lasted from August 15 to September 5, 1971. It was held in Mexico City and Guadalajara, and is the second known tournament to be named as a women's football World Cup after the 1970 edition in Italy. It was held in the same place as the men's 1970 FIFA World Cup the previous year. The tournament was held twenty years before the first official FIFA women's world cup.

The tournament featured six national teams from Latin America and Europe, including hosts Mexico who qualified automatically. Denmark were the tournament champions, defending its title by winning the final 3–0 against Mexico, in front of 110,000 spectators.

== Background ==
The first recorded women's international football match was played on May 7, 1881 in Scotland. The game consisted of the women's Scottish team and the women's English team. Later instances of international female football matches, included games between British, French and Belgian teams in the 1920s, and a women's European Championship in 1957. During this time, women's football was often stifled or banned by male-dominated football federations in many countries. For example, in Brazil, women's football was effectively illegal from 1941 until 1979. FIEFF organized the 1970 World Cup or Martini and Rossi Cup in Italy, which was the first major international women's soccer world cup. The tournament was won by Denmark and its success influenced the 1971 tournament in Mexico a year later. Since women's international football was not officially recognized by the Fédération Internationale de Football Association (FIFA) until the 1990s, the 1970 and 1971 Women's World Cup served as a precursor to the FIFA organized World Cups that followed it. The first official FIFA World Cup was in China during 1991.

== Gendered Tournament Aspects ==
The tournament mascot was Xochitl (so-cheetl), "a young girl in [a] football kit". Xochitl appeared in majority of the branding for the tournament. The name Xochitl is Nahuatl for "flower", which highlighted not only traditional femininity but also Indigenous Mexican heritage.

In addition, goal posts were pink in order to reinforce traditional female gender stereotypes, and flowers were placed throughout the stadiums. Tournament support staff also dressed in pink. These decisions were relevant as they were a distinct difference between the men's tournament a year prior.

== Host Nation ==
Mexico, the hosts of the tournament, expressed an abundance of national pride for their female team. Tracing back to the early 1900s, Mexico experienced a history of anti-female participation in athletics, demonstrated through the media and through traditional gender social norms. Before organized female athletics began in Mexico, there were initiatives for females to engage in physical movement and exercise beginning in the 1920s. Mexican females participated in unorganized athletics for years to follow with exceptions in elite social settings, which encouraged structured sports. In February 1971, the Mexican Women's Football Association was formed and consisted of 8 leagues with 20-30 teams per league. The 1971 World Cup was the first major international female football tournament hosted in Latin America. Mexican pride was particularly high for their female squad as they were the first Mexican national team to make it to a world final in both female and male athletics, and have since been the only Mexican football squad to earn this achievement.

The Mexican press also played a major role in the success of the tournament. The press was extremely involved in the circulation of details regarding the various teams and their schedules. Fans left gifts at the hotels of the Mexican team and would wait after practices for autographs from the players.

Mexico had also hosted the 1968 Summer Olympics three years prior to the Women's World Cup. In preparation for the Olympic Games the Estadio Azteca was built and inaugurated in 1966. At its opening, the stadium was the largest in Latin America, a fact which still stands today. The stadium was used for both the 1968 Olympics and the 1970 Men's FIFA World Cup, and then the 1971 Women's World Cup.

The culmination of Mexico hosting the 1968 Olympics, the 1970 Men's FIFA World Cup and the 1971 Women's World Cup allowed for an influx in tourism and media for the host nation.

== Media Coverage ==
Prior to the 1971 World Cup, women's football had received a limited amount of media attention, especially in the host nation, Mexico. Women's football did not receive any proper media attention up until the creation of the Mexican Women's Football Association in February of 1971, only months before the tournament. In Mexico, printed press coverage for men's sports began in the late 1940s and mainly consisted of football, baseball, and boxing.

While women's soccer participation was growing in Mexico, their third place finish in the 1970 World Cup is arguably what grabbed the attention of the media most powerfully. Essentially, once the success of the women's team was at level with the men's team, they gained appropriate attention.

The media coverage of the tournament is arguably what attracted so many fans. With 80,000 fans attending the opening ceremony, and a record 110,000 fans attending the final match. However, a theme of sexualized dialogue about the athletes was a major aspect of the media. An event of media commenting on the bodies and beauty of the athletes, instead of their athletic abilities and results of matches occurred. For example, The New York Times published an article named, "Soccer Goes Sexy, South of the Border", which highlighted the appearance of the female competitors and left out details about the actual tournament in regards to sport. Many reporters, both male and female, tended to report on the athletes' relationship statuses, or overall appearances, and some reporters admitted their faults after watching these women compete. In many circumstances, reporters would shift their stances after attending a match. One notable example appeared in the El Universal, which focused on the performance of Mexican player, María Eugenia Rubio. The paper, in regards to her performance and the Mexican teams, said, "her performance silenced anyone who had doubted that women could play football". While the comment is positive, it also reveals the ways in which media coverage almost backhandedly reported on the abilities of these female athletes during the tournament.

== Qualifying ==
The 1971 tournament featured five different qualifying groups, four in Europe and one in the Americas, where Argentina was the only team included in the initial draw. Italy qualified for the main tournament against England and Austria, but England was later given a place in the finals after all teams from one of the European groups (Spain, Switzerland and West Germany) withdrew from the tournament.

Similarly, France qualified by defeating the Netherlands after the withdrawal of Czechoslovakia, and Denmark qualified by default after both Belgium and Sweden withdrew. The Americas round was not played and Argentina qualified by default, as neither potential opponents, Chile and Costa Rica, fulfilled the necessary requirements for the matches to be played.

Some of the qualifiers and finals games were officially recognised – for example, the Italian Football Federation classes all of the 1971 Italy games as full internationals. The match between France and the Netherlands in April 1971 was the first FIFA-recognised women's international match: it was played in Hazebrouck in front of 1,500 spectators. However, players from both teams were unaware of the nature of the match; the French players did not know they had qualified for the tournament until their coach told them after the game, and the Dutch team thought they were playing a friendly match against Stade de Reims (which provided most of the French players) to prepare for the official match in May. A protest was filed by the Dutch organization in charge of the team, to no avail.

== Tournament ==
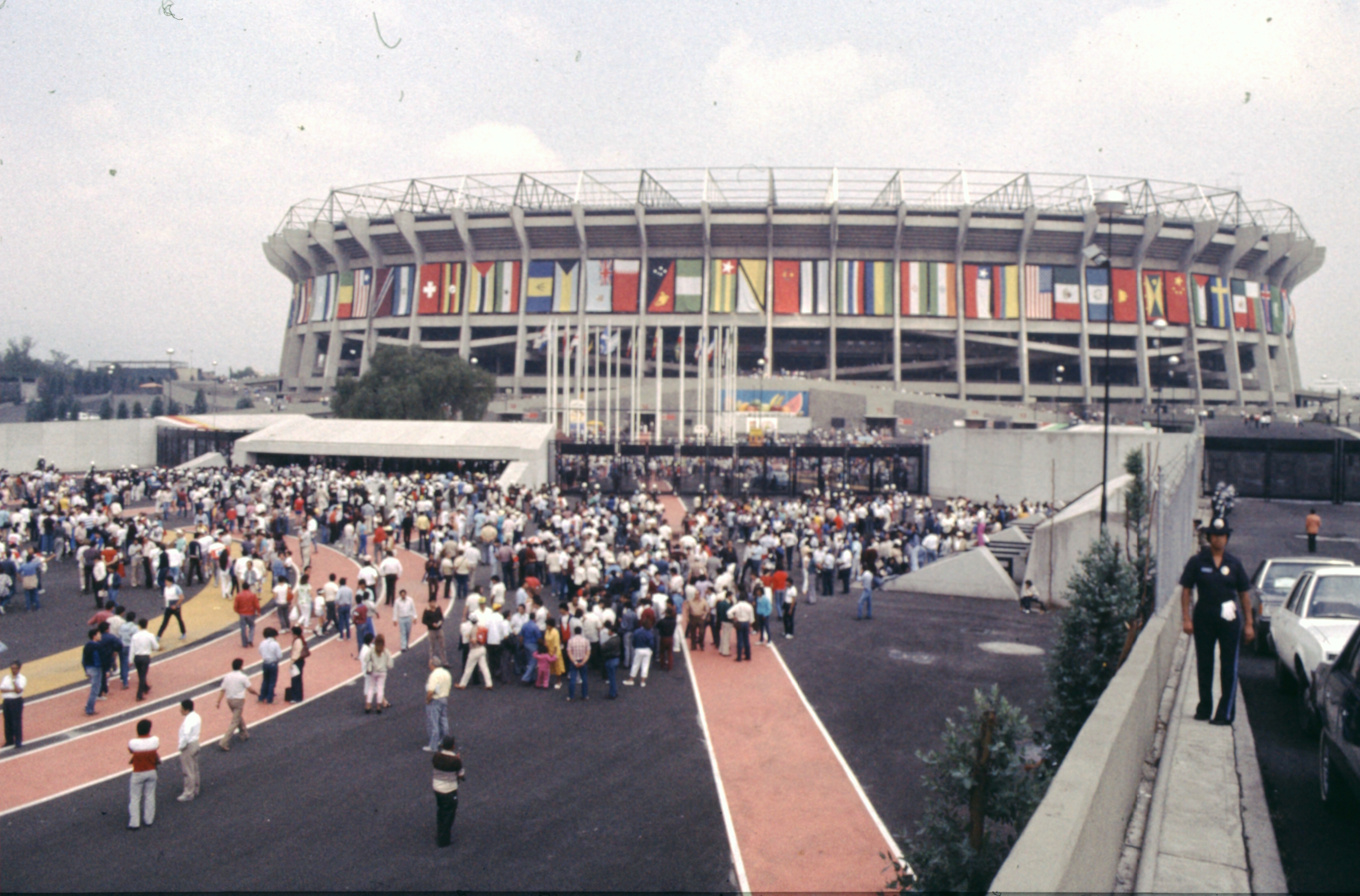
Azteca Stadium in 1986

Tournament sponsors Martini & Rossi paid for each team's travel, accommodation, and kits. Goalposts were painted pink and stadium staff wore pink clothes, in order to try to appeal to women and families. Ticket prices ranged from 30 pesos (£1.15) to 80 pesos (£3). The six teams were divided into either Group A or B for pool play. Each team played each other once, with the outcomes deciding the seedings for crossovers. Group A consisted of Argentina, England, and Mexico. Group B included Denmark, France, and Italy. Group A matches were played in Mexico City at the Estadio Azteca, while Group B matches were played in Guadalajara at the Estadio Jalisco.

The opening match of the finals, Mexico–Argentina (15 August) had a reported attendance of 100,000 at the Azteca Stadium. An estimated 80,000 people attended the Mexico–England group game. The World Cup final, Mexico–Denmark, had an estimated attendance of 110,000, a world record for women's sport. This figure was reported both at the time and subsequently, and surviving footage supports the estimates. The football record at the Azteca Stadium was three years earlier, 119,853 at the men's Mexico–Brazil match in July 1968.

The hosts Mexico qualified for the final after defeating Italy in the semifinals. Two days before the final, the Mexican press noted the players for Mexico were unhappy they had not been receiving economic support for participating in the tournament. The Mexican team threatened to skip the final but gave up their two million peso demand and the game went forward as scheduled.

Denmark won the tournament after beating Mexico 3–0 in the final, featuring a hat trick by 15-year-old Susanne Augustesen. The victorious Danish team were treated to a celebratory reception at Copenhagen Town Hall upon their return from the tournament. However, due to the unofficial nature of the tournament, it is not recognised by the Danish Football Association.

== Squads ==
England's team included 13-year-old Leah Caleb, 14-year-old Gill Sayell, and 15-year-old Chris Lockwood; their captain was 19-year-old Carol Wilson and they were accompanied by referee Pat Dunn as a chaperone and trainer. 15-year-old Susanne Augustesen scored a hat-trick for Denmark as they beat Mexico 3–0 in the final. Augustesen was honoured by the mayor of her hometown, Holbæk.

12 members of England's 14-woman squad reunited in June 2019 for the first time since the tournament.

== Group stage ==
=== Group 1 ===
Pos	Team	Pld	W	D	L	GF	GA	Pts
1	Mexico	2	2	0	0	7	1	4
2	Argentina	2	1	0	1	5	4	2
3	England	2	0	0	2	1	8	0

15 August 1971

Mexico	3–1	Argentina
Rubio 21', 54'; Hernández 30'	Report	Cardoso 34'

Azteca Stadium, Mexico City
Attendance: 100,000
Referee: Cosentina (Italy)
21 August 1971

Argentina	4–1	England
Elba Selva 7', 31', 34' (pen.), 71'	Report	Burton 13'

Mexico City
Referee: Cosentina (Italy)
22 August 1971

Mexico	4–0	England
Aguilar 12', 43'; Huerta 23'; Zaragoza 49'

Mexico City

=== Group 2 ===
Pos	Team	Pld	W	D	L	GF	GA	Pts
1	Denmark	2	1	1	0	4	1	3
2	Italy	2	1	1	0	2	1	3
3	France	2	0	0	2	0	4	0

18 August 1971

Denmark	3–0	France
Augustesen 7'; L. Nielsen 32', 67'	Report

Guadalajara
Attendance: 25,000
Referee: Salazar (Mexico)
21 August 1971

France	0–1	Italy
	Report	Schiavo 23'

Guadalajara
Referee: Caves (England)
22 August 1971

Denmark	1–1	Italy
H. Hansen 10'	Report	Avon 43'

Guadalajara
Referee: Minarich (Switzerland)

== Knockout stage ==
=== Bracket ===
Semi-finals
28 August — Mexico City
Denmark	5
Argentina	0
29 August — Mexico City
Mexico	2
Italy	1

Final
5 September — Mexico City
Denmark	3
Mexico	0
Third place
4 September — Guadalajara
Italy	4
Argentina	0

=== Semi-finals ===
28 August 1971

Denmark	5–0	Argentina
L. Nielsen 34', 50', 68'; H. Hansen 53'; Frederiksen 64'	Report

Mexico City

29 August 1971

Mexico	2–1	Italy
Hernández 7' (pen.), 24' (pen.)	Report	Carmen Varone 6'

Mexico City
Attendance: 80,000 / 90,000
Referee: Frère (France)

=== Fifth place play-off ===
A match for fifth place was played between the two teams which did not advance to the semifinals.

28 August 1971

England	2–3	France
Janice Barton 10', 16'		Armelle Binard 12'; Jocelyne Henry 22'; Ghislaine Royer 32'

Guadalajara

=== Third place play-off ===
4 September 1971

Italy	4–0	Argentina
Elisabetta Vignotto 4', 32', 67'; Elena Schiavo 63'	Report

Estadio Jalisco, Guadalajara
Referee: Salazar (Mexico)

=== Final ===
5 September 1971

Denmark	3–0	Mexico
Susanne Augustesen 26', 52', 62'	Report

Azteca Stadium, Mexico City
Attendance: 110,000 /
112,500
Referee: Minarich (Switzerland)

== Later tournaments ==
The tournament was later followed by the series of Mundialito tournaments throughout the 1980s, mostly held in Italy, and FIFA's Women's Invitation Tournament in China in 1988 before the first FIFA Women's World Cup in China in 1991.

== Aftermath ==
As of 2023, several documentaries were released about the 1971 event:

In Mexico, Tan cerca de las nubes, directed by Manuel Cañibe, on that country's squad that participated in the 1970 cup in Italy, as well as the 1971 one. In Argentina, México 71, directed by Carolina Gil Solari and Carolina M. Fernández, on the Argentine squad's experiences during the cup. In the UK, Copa 71 (2023), directed by Rachel Ramsay and James Erskine.

== Bibliography ==
- Barboni, Luca; Cecchi, Gabriele (1999). Annuario del calcio femminile 1999-2000 (in Italian). Fornacette (Pisa, Italy): Mariposa Editrice S.r.l. pp. 230–231.
