= List of England national football team captains =

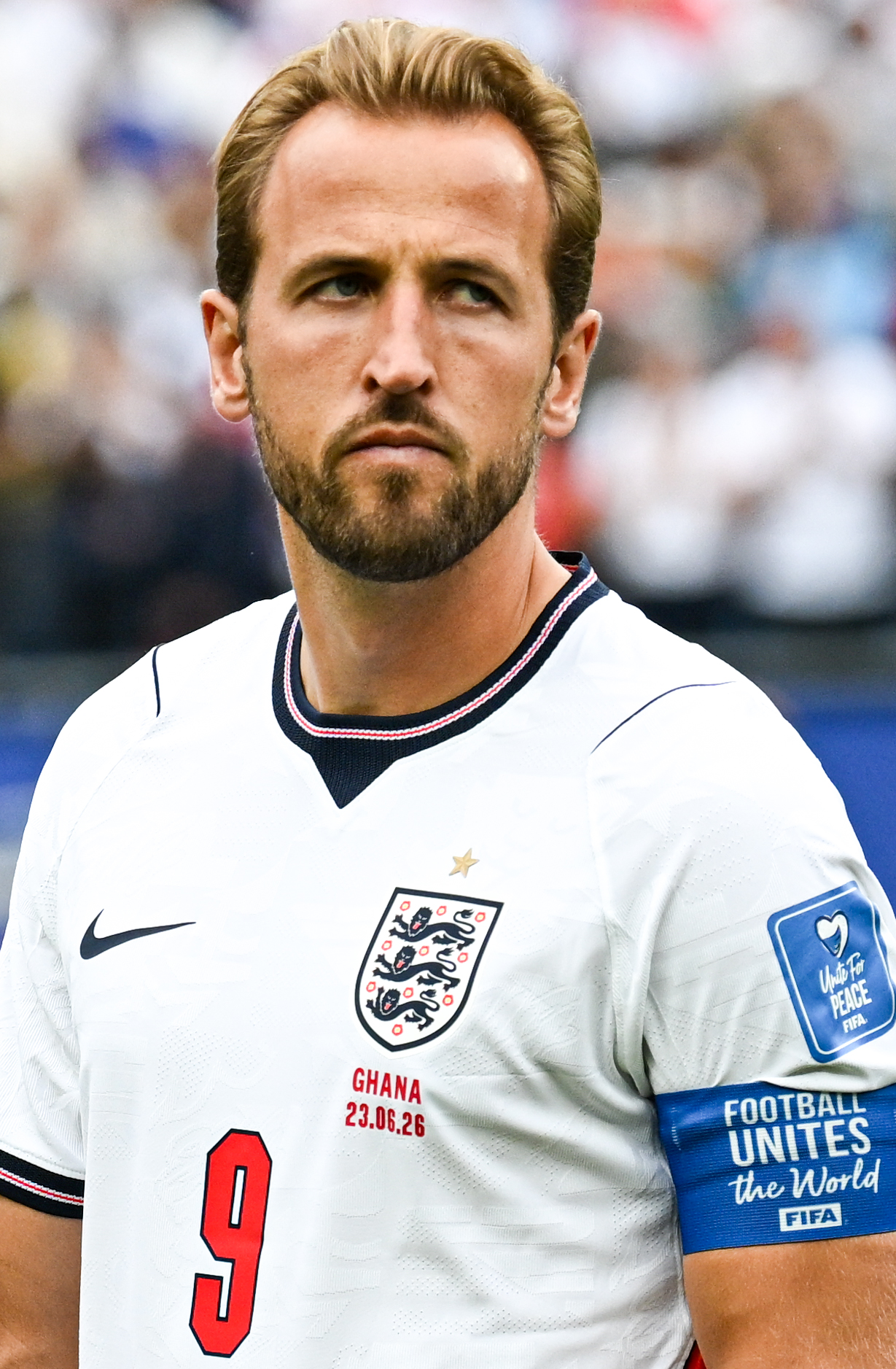
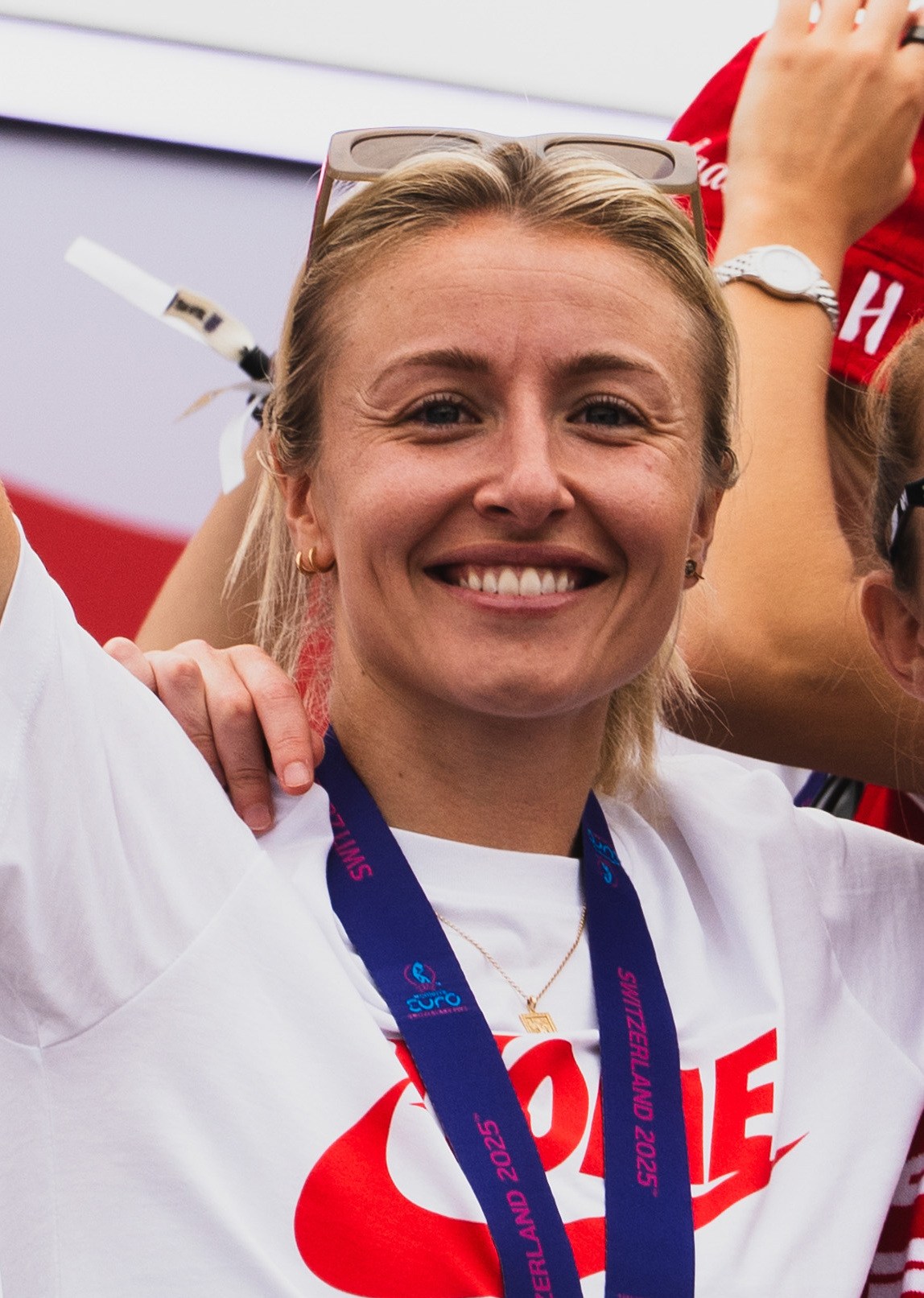
England's men's and women's captains, Harry Kane (left, pictured in 2026) and Leah Williamson (right, pictured in 2025)

156 people have officially served as captains of the England national football teams. The current captains are Harry Kane (men's) and Leah Williamson (women's).

The first England captain was Cuthbert Ottaway; he captained England in the first ever international match, against Scotland on 30 November 1872. He went on to captain England on just one further occasion, the third international match, on 7 March 1874, against the same opposition. Alexander Morten captained England in their first international on home soil, 8 March 1873, also against Scotland, and was the first international captain to win a match. Having previously played for Scotland against England, this was his only international appearance for England. Morten remains England's oldest captain.

The first unofficial women's international match was contested by England and France in 1920, with the Dick, Kerr Ladies "England" side captained by Alice Kell. The England women's team was authorised in 1972 by the Women's Football Association (WFA), originally unaffiliated with the Football Association (FA), and had Sheila Parker as its first captain. The official England women's first international match was played against Scotland on 18 November 1972, in anticipation of the centenary of the equivalent men's match. Parker remained in her role for four years before being left out of the 1976 British Home Championship; her replacement, Carol Thomas (née McCune), was only 20 when she took the armband, and retained it for nearly a decade. Women's players between 1972 and 1993 were not all officially recognised until 2022; there were also several prior to 1972, who were not sanctioned and are not recognised. Thomas is England's youngest official captain under the WFA; Keira Walsh is England's youngest official captain under the FA. (Note: Carol Wilson (in unrecognised matches) and Casey Stoney (receiving the armband partway through a match) unofficially served as captains when younger than Thomas and Walsh. In 2004, after the unofficial captaincies of Wilson (1971) and Stoney (2003), and after Thomas' WFA career as captain (1976–85), The Guardian named Bobby Moore as "still the youngest ever England captain".)

Kane has led England over 100 times and holds the record for most captaincies of England, having overtaken Billy Wright and Bobby Moore (both with 90) in 2026; Moore remains England's youngest men's captain and the only England captain to have lifted the World Cup. Steph Houghton has the record for captaincies of the women's team, and outright fourth-most caps as captain (72) behind Kane, Wright and Moore. Seven male players were captain in their only international cap, the last of these being in 1925. Williamson is England's only captain to have lifted the Euro, which she has done twice, and the only England captain to win a major trophy outside of England.

Several women's matches have seen two players start as co-captains. The most players known to wear the captain's armband for England in one match is four, which has happened three times. On 3 June 2003, Michael Owen started as captain with Emile Heskey, Phil Neville, and Jamie Carragher all wearing the armband. On 30 November 2021, Millie Bright started as captain, with Ellen White, Keira Walsh, and Alex Greenwood also wearing the armband. On 29 November 2025, Keira Walsh started as captain, and Lucy Bronze, Alessia Russo and Georgia Stanway also wore the armband.

== Terminology ==
Any player who is listed on the teamsheet of an official match as captain, and starts the match with the armband, is recognised by the FA as having officially captained England.

- Permanent captain: A player who has been named captain indefinitely, and who is presumed will start as captain when fit and available.
- Interim captain: A player who has been named as the presumptive captain for a fixed period while the permanent captain is unavailable, typically a vice captain.
- Reserve captain: A player who has taken the captain's armband on a one-off match basis when the permanent captain is unavailable. The player is given the responsibility prior to the game.
- Unofficial captain: A player who has worn the captain's armband during a match but not recognised as having officially captained England, either because the match is not official or (in official matches) because they received the armband part way through a match due to the substitution of or the receiving of a red card by the captain. A permanent or interim captain who starts from the bench and takes the armband when they are substituted on would still not be considered that match's official captain.

== Captains by appearances as captain ==
Figures include all recognised matches up to match played 15 November 2026. Only confirmed captaincies of named captains are counted.

The default order for this list is by most appearances as captain, then chronological order of first captaincy.

- **Bold** indicates permanent captain of England
- Yellow and italics indicates still-active players
- Sources unless specified: (Note: Women's matches (Englandfootballonline.com indices):)

#	Player	England career	Caps as captain	Total caps	First captaincy	No.
1	**Harry Kane**	2015–present	**102**	127	10 June 2017	138
2	**Billy Wright**	1946–1959	**90**	105	9 October 1948	66
2	**Bobby Moore**	1962–1973	**90**	108	29 May 1963	71
4	**Steph Houghton**	2007–2022	**72**	121	17 January 2014	127
5	**Bryan Robson**	1980–1991	**65**	90	17 November 1982	92
6	**David Beckham**	1996–2009	**59**	115	15 November 2000	108
7	**Carol Thomas (née McCune)**	1976–1985	49–**51** (Note: Contemporary to the end of her career, the Guinness Book of Records listed Thomas with 49 caps as captain from 56 overall international caps, which it repeated in every edition through 1990. When Thomas was inducted into the English Football Hall of Fame in 2021, they reported 51 caps as captain, still from 56 international caps. Thomas has stated that the only match she did not captain between first taking the armband and retiring was a 17 August 1985 game against Wales.)	56	22 May 1976	82
8	**Faye White**	1997–2012	**48**	90	7 March 2002	111
8	**Leah Williamson**	2018–present	**48**	69	17 September 2021	150
10	**Gillian Coultard**	1981–2000	**38+** (Note: Some teamsheets from the appropriate period are unavailable, incomplete, or do not indicate captain.)	119	25 November 1990	97
10	**Steven Gerrard**	2000–2014	**38**	114	31 March 2004	114
12	**Alan Shearer**	1992–2000	**34**	63	1 September 1996	103
12	**John Terry**	2003–2012	**34**	78	16 August 2006	115
14	**Kevin Keegan**	1972–1982	**31**	63	24 March 1976	81
15	**Debbie Bampton**	1978–1997	**26+**	95	22 September 1985	93
16	**Emlyn Hughes**	1969–1980	**23**	62	11 March 1974	78
16	**Wayne Rooney**	2003–2018	**23**	120	14 November 2009	120
18	**Bob Crompton**	1902–1914	**22**	41	2 March 1903	32
18	**Johnny Haynes**	1954–1962	**22**	56	15 May 1960	69
20	**Eddie Hapgood**	1933–1939	**20**	30	14 November 1934	59
20	Millie Bright	2016–present	**20**	88	13 April 2021	148
22	**David Platt**	1989–1996	**19**	62	17 February 1993	100
22	**Casey Stoney**	2000–2017	**19**	130	7 March 2009 (Note: Casey Stoney was first handed the captain's armband on an unofficial basis on 25 February 2003 (age 20) when captain Karen Walker was substituted off; this captaincy is not counted as she was not named/did not start as captain. She first made an appearance as a named captain, starting the match as captain (as reserve for Faye White), on 7 March 2009 (age 26).)	119
24	**Gary Lineker**	1984–1992	**18**	80	12 September 1990	96
25	Mary Phillip	1995–2008	**17+**	65	17 May 2003	113
26	**Norman Bailey**	1878–1887	**15**	19	12 March 1881	11
26	**Jimmy Armfield**	1959–1966	**15**	43	28 September 1961	70
26	Peter Shilton	1970–1990	**15**	125	25 May 1982	89
26	**Tony Adams**	1987–2000	**15**	66	12 October 1994	102
30	**Viv Woodward**	1903–1911	**14**	23	15 February 1908	34
31	**G. O. Smith**	1893–1901	**13**–16 (Note: The captaincy for England vs Ireland, 7 March 1896 is disputed between G. O. Smith (13 confirmed captaincies), and George Raikes and Vaughan Lodge, neither of whom had captained England in another match.) (Note: The match on 16 March 1896 may have been captained by Gilbert (G. O.) Smith.)	20	4 April 1896	25
31	**George Hardwick**	1946–1948	**13**	13	28 September 1946	64
33	**Roy Goodall**	1926–1933	**12**	25	31 March 1928	53
34	**Sheila Parker**	1972–1983	**11**	33	18 November 1972	77
34	Fara Williams	2001–2019	**11**	172	5 March 2009	118
36	Ray Wilkins	1976–1986	**10**	84	22 September 1982	91
36	**Stuart Pearce**	1987–1999	**10**	78	8 June 1991	99
36	**Jordan Henderson**	2010–present	**10**	91	8 October 2016	137
36	Keira Walsh	2017–present	**10**	105	4 September 2018	142
40	**Jack Hill**	1925–1929	**8**	11	2 April 1927	51
40	Gerry Francis	1974–1976	**8**	12	3 September 1975	80
40	Mick Mills	1972–1982	**8**	42	13 May 1978	84
40	Michael Owen	1998–2008	**8**	89	17 April 2002	112
40	Frank Lampard	1999–2014	**8**	106	9 February 2011	122
45	**George Wilson**	1921–1924	**7**	12	22 October 1921	41
45	Terry Butcher	1980–1990	**7**	77	12 November 1986	94
45	Paul Ince	1992–2000	**7**	53	9 June 1993	101
45	**Rio Ferdinand**	1997–2011	**7**	81	26 March 2008	116
45	Eric Dier	2015–2022	**7**	49	10 November 2017	140
50	George Male	1934–1939	**6**	19	18 November 1936	61
50	Alan Ball	1965–1975	**6**	72	12 March 1975	79
50	**Phil Thompson**	1976–1982	**6**	42	22 November 1979	85
53	**Percy Walters**	1885–1890	**5**	13	13 March 1886	14
53	Willis Edwards	1926–1929	**5**	16	22 October 1928	54
53	**Ronnie Clayton**	1955–1960	**5**	35	17 October 1959	68
53	**Mo Marley**	1995–2001	**5**	41	4 June 2000	106
53	Gary Cahill	2010–2018	**5**	61	9 October 2015	131
53	Jill Scott	2006–2022	**5**	161	27 October 2015	133
53	Lucy Bronze	2013–present	**5**	148	1 March 2018	141
53	Harry Maguire	2017–present	**5**	66	7 September 2019	146
61	**Tinsley Lindley**	1886–1891	**4**	13	4 February 1888	15
61	**Stanley Harris**	1904–1906	**4**	6	25 February 1905	33
61	**Sam Wadsworth**	1922–1926	**4**	9	22 October 1924	46
61	David Jack	1924–1932	**4**	9	5 April 1930	55
61	Ernie Blenkinsop	1928–1933	**4**	26	9 December 1931	57
61	Thomas Cooper	1927–1934	**4**	15	14 April 1934	58
61	Martin Peters	1966–1974	**4**	67	19 May 1971	75
61	**Tara Proctor**	1995–2002	**4**	20	30 June 2001	109
61	Kelly Smith	1995–2014	**4**	117	28 September 2008	117
70	**Robert Holmes**	1888–1895	**3**	7	13 March 1893	22
70	**Howard Spencer**	1897–1905	**3**	6	14 February 1903	31
70	**Arthur Grimsdell**	1920–1923	**3**	6	9 April 1921	39
70	Alfred Bower (Note: Alfred Bower was the last amateur player to captain England.)	1923–1927	**3**	5	8 December 1924	47
70	Billy Walker	1920–1932	**3**	18	21 May 1925	48
70	Alfred Strange	1930–1933	**3**	20	14 May 1931	56
70	Sam Barkas	1936–1937	**3**	18	23 October 1937	62
70	Alf Ramsey	1948–1953	**3**	32	15 November 1950	67
70	Ron Flowers	1955–1966	**3**	49	27 May 1964	72
70	Bobby Charlton	1958–1970	**3**	106	15 January 1969	73
70	David V. Watson	1974–1982	**3**	65	24 April 1981	87
70	Sol Campbell	1996–2007	**3**	73	24 May 1998	105
70	**Karen Walker**	1988–2003	**3**	83	24 February 2002	110
70	Ellen White	2010–2022	**3**	113	1 July 2017	139
70	Mary Earps	2017–2025	**3**	53	1 July 2023	152
70	Kyle Walker	2011–2026	**3**	96	20 November 2023	153
70	Declan Rice	2019–present	**3**	82	26 March 2024	154
87	**Cuthbert Ottaway**	1872–1874	**2**	2	30 November 1872	1
87	Charles Bambridge	1879–1887	**2**	18	18 February 1882	12
87	**John Goodall**	1888–1898	**2**	14	7 February 1891	18
87	**Arthur Dunn**	1883–1892	**2**	4	15 March 1892	20
87	**George Cotterill**	1891–1893	**2**	4	25 February 1893	21
87	Charles Wreford-Brown	1889–1898	**2** or 3 (Note: Sources differ concerning the captaincy for England vs Wales, 12 March 1894. It was either Charles Wreford-Brown or Cunliffe Gosling.)	4	18 March 1895	23
87	**Jesse Pennington**	1907–1920	**2**	25	15 March 1920	36
87	**Charlie Buchan**	1913–1924	**2**	6	14 March 1921	38
87	Basil Patchitt	1923	**2**	2	21 May 1923	43
87	Frank Swift	1946–1949	**2**	19	16 May 1948	65
87	Mick Channon	1972–1977	**2**	46	28 May 1976	83
87	Rachel Yankey	1997–2013	**2**	129	29 July 2010	121
87	Laura Bassett	2003–2017	**2**	63	7 March 2014	128
87	Jordan Nobbs	2013–present	**2**	71	11 March 2015	130
87	Joe Hart	2008–2017	**2**	75	13 November 2015	134
87	Raheem Sterling	2012–2022	**2**	82	7 June 2019	145
87	Kieran Trippier	2017–present	**2**	54	8 October 2020	147
87	Alex Greenwood	2014–present	**2**	113	19 February 2023	151
105	**Alexander Morten**	1873	**1**	1	8 March 1873	2
105	**Charles W. Alcock**	1875	**1**	1	6 March 1875 (Note: Alcock had earlier captained England in the officially-unrecognised representative matches.)	3
105	**Hubert Heron**	1873–1878	**1**	5	4 March 1876	4
105	**William Rawson**	1875–1877	**1**	2	3 March 1877	5
105	**Arthur Cursham**	1880–1884	**1** or 2 (Note: Sources differ concerning the captaincy for England vs Wales, 18 January 1879. It was either Arthur Cursham or Henry Wace.)	6	2 March 1878	6
105	**Henry Wace**	1878–1879	**1** or 2	3	5 April 1879	7
105	**Charles Wollaston**	1874–1880	**1**	4	13 March 1880	8
105	**Francis Sparks**	1879–1880	**1**	3	15 March 1880	9
105	**Jack Hunter**	1878–1882	**1**	7	26 February 1881	10
105	John Hudson	1883	**1**	1	24 February 1883	13
105	John Brodie	1889–1891	**1**	3	2 March 1889	16
105	**Arthur Walters**	1885–1890	**1**	9	5 April 1890	17
105	**Billy Moon**	1888–1885	**1**	7	6 April 1891	19
105	R. Cunliffe Gosling	1892–1895	**1** or 2	5	6 April 1895	24
105	William Oakley	1895–1901	**1**	16	9 March 1901	26
105	Ernest Needham	1894–1902	**1**	16	18 March 1901	27
105	**Reginald Foster**	1900–1902	**1**	5	3 March 1902	28
105	Frank Forman	1898–1903	**1**	9	22 March 1902	29
105	Stephen Bloomer	1895–1907	**1** or 2 (Note: Bloomer captained two successive games in 1902, with the first, on 5 April 1902, seeing the 1902 Ibrox disaster occur. This match was, afterwards, declared null and void by the Football Association.)	23	3 May 1902	30
105	Arthur Knight	1919	**1**	1	25 October 1919	35
105	Joseph McCall	1913–1920	**1**	5	23 October 1920	37
105	Ephraim Longworth	1920–1923	**1**	5	21 May 1921	40
105	Max Woosnam	1922	**1**	1	13 March 1922	42
105	Graham Doggart	1923	**1**	1	1 November 1923	44
105	Frank Moss	1924	**1**	5	12 April 1924	45
105	Claude Ashton (Note: Claude Ashton was the last player to be appointed captain for his solitary England appearance.)	1925	**1**	1	24 October 1925	49
105	Tommy Lucas	1921–1926	**1**	3	24 May 1926	50
105	Fred Kean	1923–1929	**1**	9	21 May 1927	52
105	Jack Barker	1934–1936	**1**	11	17 October 1936	60
105	Stan Cullis	1937–1939	**1**	12	24 May 1939	63
105	Alan Mullery	1964–1971	**1**	35	3 February 1971	74
105	Colin Bell	1968–1975	**1**	48	23 May 1972	76
105	Trevor Cherry	1976–1980	**1**	27	31 May 1980	86
105	Ray Clemence	1972–1983	**1**	61	12 May 1981	88
105	Phil Neal	1976–1983	**1**	50	2 June 1982	90
105	Peter Beardsley	1986–1996	**1**	59	13 February 1988	95
105	Mark Wright	1984–1996	**1**	45	21 May 1991	98
105	David Seaman	1988–2003	**1**	75	10 September 1997	104
105	Martin Keown	1992–2002	**1**	43	11 September 2000	107
105	Gareth Barry	2000–2012	**1**	53	29 March 2011	123
105	Scott Parker	2003–2013	**1**	11	29 February 2012	124
105	Ashley Cole	2001–2014	**1**	107	29 May 2013 (Note: Cole was never a formal reserve or vice captain, but started with the armband as a gesture to celebrate his 100th cap. The match was actually Cole's 102nd cap, and there was reported surprise that he accepted the offer, as he had previously scorned the captaincy.)	125
105	Alex Scott	2004–2017	**1**	140	31 October 2013	126
105	Karen Bardsley	2005–2022	**1**	81	9 March 2015	129
105	Phil Jagielka	2008–2016	**1**	40	12 October 2015	132
105	James Milner	2009–2016	**1**	61	29 March 2016	135
105	Chris Smalling	2011–2017	**1**	31	27 May 2016	136
105	Toni Duggan	2012–present	**1**	76	8 November 2018 (Note: Duggan took the place of captain Steph Houghton so that Houghton could defer her 100th England cap by a match to play it at home rather than away. Other recent stand-in captains were unavailable — Keira Walsh was injured, Lucy Bronze also did not travel, and Jordan Nobbs was an unused substitute — and manager Phil Neville said Duggan's importance in the team was cause for her selection.)	143
105	Fabian Delph	2014–2019	**1**	20	15 November 2018	144
105	Marcus Rashford	2016–present	**1**	78	6 June 2021	149
105	John Stones	2014–present	**1**	94	10 October 2024	155
105	Marc Guéhi	2022–present	**1**	41	31 March 2026	156

== Men's team ==
=== Captain chronology ===
- **Bold** indicates current captain
- Italics indicates still-active players
- Sources unless specified:

Tenure	Incumbent	Tournaments as captain (Note: Bold indicates tournament winners)	Reserve captains
1872–1874	Cuthbert Ottaway		
1873	Alexander Morten		
1875	Charles W. Alcock		
1876	Hubert Heron		
1877	William Rawson		
1878–1879	Arthur Cursham		
1879	Henry Wace		
1880	Charles Wollaston		
1880	Francis Sparks		
1881	Jack Hunter		
1881–1887	Norman Bailey	1884 British Home Championship; 1885 British Home Championship; **1886 British Home Championship**; 1887 British Home Championship	Charles Bambridge; Jack Hudson; Percy Walters
1888	Tinsley Lindley	**1888 British Home Championship**	
1889–1890	Percy Walters	1889 British Home Championship; **1890 British Home Championship**	Jack Brodie
1891	Tinsley Lindley	**1891 British Home Championship**	
1891	John Goodall		
1891	Billy Moon		
1892	Arthur Dunn		
1893	George Cotterill	**1893 British Home Championship**	Bob Holmes
1894–1895	Bob Holmes	1894 British Home Championship	Charles Wreford-Brown; John Goodall; R. Cunliffe Gosling
1896–1901	G. O. Smith	1896 British Home Championship; 1897 British Home Championship; **1898 British Home Championship**; **1899 British Home Championship**; 1900 British Home Championship; **1901 British Home Championship**	William Oakley; Ernest Needham
1902	R. E. Foster	1902 British Home Championship	Frank Forman; Steve Bloomer
1903	Howard Spencer	**1903 British Home Championship**	Bob Crompton
1904	Bob Crompton	**1904 British Home Championship**	
1905	Howard Spencer	**1905 British Home Championship**	Stan Harris
1906	Stan Harris	**1906 British Home Championship**	
1907	Bob Crompton	1907 British Home Championship	
1908–1911	Vivian Woodward	**1908 British Home Championship**; Austro-Hungarian Tour (1908); **1909 British Home Championship**; Austro-Hungarian Tour (1909); **1911 British Home Championship**	Bob Crompton
1912–1914	Bob Crompton	**1912 British Home Championship**; **1913 British Home Championship**; 1914 British Home Championship	
**1914–1918: World War I**
1919–1920	Jesse Pennington	1919–20 British Home Championship	Arthur Knight
1921	Charlie Buchan	1920–21 British Home Championship	Joe McCall; Arthur Grimsdell
1921	Arthur Grimsdell		Ephraim Longworth
1921–1924	George Wilson	1921–22 British Home Championship; 1922–23 British Home Championship; 1923–24 British Home Championship	Max Woosnam; Arthur Grimsdell; Charlie Buchan; Basil Patchitt; Graham Doggart; Frank Moss
1924–1927	Sam Wadsworth	1924–25 British Home Championship; 1925–26 British Home Championship; **1926–27 British Home Championship**	Alfred Bower; Billy Walker; Claude Ashton; Tommy Lucas; Jack Hill
1927–1929	Jack Hill	Franco-Belgian Tour (1927); 1927–28 British Home Championship; Franco-Belgian Tour (1928); 1928–29 British Home Championship; Western Europe Tour (1929)	Fred Kean; Roy Goodall; Willis Edwards
1930–1933	Roy Goodall	**1929–30 British Home Championship**; Austro-Germanic Tour (1930); **1930–31 British Home Championship**; Franco-Belgian Tour (1931); **1931–32 British Home Championship**; 1932–33 British Home Championship; 1933–34 British Home Championship	Willis Edwards; David Jack; Alf Strange; Ernie Blenkinsop; Billy Walker; Tom Cooper
1934–1939	Eddie Hapgood	Central Europe Tour (1934); **1934–35 British Home Championship**; 1935–36 British Home Championship; Austro-Belgian Tour (1936); 1936–37 British Home Championship; Scandinavian Tour (1937); **1937–38 British Home Championship**; Franco-German Tour (1938); **1938–39 British Home Championship**; Southwestern Europe Tour (1939)	Jack Barker; George Male; Sam Barkas; Stan Cullis
**1939–1945: World War II**
1946–1948	George Hardwick	1946–47 British Home Championship; 1947–48 British Home Championship	Frank Swift
1948–1959	Billy Wright	1948–49 British Home Championship; Scandinavian Tour (1949); **1949–50 British Home Championship**; Western Europe Tour (1950); 1950 FIFA World Cup; 1950–51 British Home Championship; **1951–52 British Home Championship**; Alps Tour (1952); **1952–53 British Home Championship**; American Tour (1953); **1953–54 British Home Championship**; Mitropa Tour (1954); 1954 FIFA World Cup; **1954–55 British Home Championship**; Western Europe Tour (1955); **1955–56 British Home Championship**; Baltic Tour (1956); **1956–57 British Home Championship**; **1957–58 British Home Championship**; Slavic Tour (1958); 1958 FIFA World Cup; **1958–59 British Home Championship**; American Tour (1959)	Alf Ramsey
1959–1960	Ronnie Clayton	**1959–60 British Home Championship**; Spanish-Hungarian Tour (1960)	Johnny Haynes
1960–1962	Johnny Haynes	**1960–61 British Home Championship**; Alps Tour (1961); 1961–62 British Home Championship; 1962 FIFA World Cup	Jimmy Armfield
1962–1964	Jimmy Armfield	1962–63 British Home Championship; **1963–64 British Home Championship**; England vs Rest of the World (1963)	Bobby Moore
1964–1973	Bobby Moore	Atlantic Tour (1964); **1964–65 British Home Championship**; Gothic Tour (1965); **1965–66 British Home Championship**; Baltic Tour (1966); **1966 FIFA World Cup**; 1966–67 British Home Championship; **1967–68 British Home Championship**; UEFA Euro 1968; **1968–69 British Home Championship**; American Tour (1969); **1969–70 British Home Championship**; South American Tour (1970); 1970 FIFA World Cup; **1970–71 British Home Championship**; **1971–72 British Home Championship**; **1972–73 British Home Championship**	Ron Flowers; Jimmy Armfield; Bobby Charlton; Alan Mullery; Martin Peters; Colin Bell
1974-1979	Emlyn Hughes	**1973–74 British Home Championship**; Eastern Europe Tour (1974); **1974–75 British Home Championship**; Bicentennial Cup; 1975–76 British Home Championship; South American Tour (1977); **1977–78 British Home Championship**; **1978–79 British Home Championship**; Gothic Tour (1979)	Martin Peters; Alan Ball; Gerry Francis; Kevin Keegan; Mick Channon; Mick Mills; Phil Thompson
1979-1980	Kevin Keegan	UEFA Euro 1980; Nordic Tour (1982); 1982 FIFA World Cup	Phil Thompson; Emlyn Hughes; Mick Mills; Trevor Cherry; Ray Clemence; Peter Shilton
1980	Phil Thompson	1979–80 British Home Championship	Emlyn Hughes
1980-1982	Kevin Keegan	UEFA Euro 1980; 1980–81 British Home Championship; **1981–82 British Home Championship**; Nordic Tour (1982); 1982 FIFA World Cup	Mick Mills; Phil Thompson; Trevor Cherry; Ray Clemence; Peter Shilton
1982–1991	Bryan Robson	**1982–83 British Home Championship**; Australian Tour (1983); 1983–84 British Home Championship; South American Tour (1984); 1985 Rous Cup; Ciudad de México Cup; Azteca 2000 Tournamet; **1986 Rous Cup**; 1986 FIFA World Cup; 1987 Rous Cup; **1988 Rous Cup**; UEFA Euro 1988; **1989 Rous Cup**; 1990 FIFA World Cup; Australasian Tour (1991)	Peter Shilton; Ray Wilkins; Terry Butcher; Peter Beardsley
1991–1992	Gary Lineker	UEFA Euro 1992	Mark Wright; Stuart Pearce
1992–1993	Stuart Pearce	1993 U.S. Cup	Paul Ince; David Platt
1993–1996	David Platt	Umbro Cup (1995)	Tony Adams
1996	Tony Adams	UEFA Euro 1996	Alan Shearer
1997–2000	Alan Shearer	**1997 Tournoi de France**; King Hassan II Tournament; 1998 FIFA World Cup; UEFA Euro 2000	Stuart Pearce; Paul Ince; David Seaman; Tony Adams; Sol Campbell
2000	Tony Adams		Sol Campbell; Martin Keown
2000–2006	David Beckham	2002 FIFA World Cup; UEFA Euro 2004; 2006 FIFA World Cup	Michael Owen; Steven Gerrard; Sol Campbell
2006–2010	John Terry		Rio Ferdinand; Steven Gerrard; David Beckham
2010–2011	Rio Ferdinand	2010 FIFA World Cup	Steven Gerrard; Frank Lampard; Gareth Barry
2011–2012	John Terry		Frank Lampard; Scott Parker
2012–2014	Steven Gerrard	UEFA Euro 2012; 2014 FIFA World Cup	Frank Lampard; Wayne Rooney; Gareth Barry
2014–2017	Wayne Rooney	UEFA Euro 2016	Gary Cahill; Joe Hart; Phil Jagielka; James Milner; Chris Smalling; Jordan Henderson; Harry Kane
2017–2018	Jordan Henderson		Gary Cahill; Joe Hart; Harry Kane; Eric Dier
2018–present	**Harry Kane**	2018 FIFA World Cup; 2018–19 UEFA Nations League; UEFA Euro 2020; 2020–21 UEFA Nations League; 2022–23 UEFA Nations League; 2022 FIFA World Cup; UEFA Euro 2024; 2026 FIFA World Cup	Jordan Henderson; Gary Cahill; Eric Dier; Raheem Sterling; Harry Maguire; Kieran Trippier; Marcus Rashford; Kyle Walker; Declan Rice; John Stones; Marc Guéhi

== Women's team ==
=== Captain chronology ===
- **Bold** indicates current captain
- Italics indicates still-active players
- indicates player was captain for matches under the Women's Football Association (Note: The Women's Football Association fielded their first England team in 1972, and was the governing body of women's football in England until the Football Association incorporated the team in 1993, marking a change in the formal organisation of it. Few of the international matches contested by the team were considered official. In 2019, women's sports history researcher Jean Williams found that "many of the games before 1993 were not recognised as official internationals, [...] and, though recognised by the FA with a virtual cap as representative games, many women players do not have more than one or two caps for their country as a result." The WFA had so little funding that one woman hand-stitched caps for players. The FA announced in 2022 that it would seek to recognise all former women's internationals.)

Tenure	Incumbent	Interim captain(s)	Tournaments as captain	Reserve captains
1972–1976	Sheila Parker			
1976–	Carol Thomas (née McCune)		**1976 Pony Home International Championship**; 1979 European Competition for Women's Football; 1981 Mundialito	
**1983: WFA becomes a "County Association" of The Football Association**
–1985	Carol Thomas (née McCune)		1984 European Competition for Women's Football; 1984 Mundialito; **1985 Mundialito**	
1985–	Debbie Bampton		1987 European Competition for Women's Football; **1988 Mundialito**; 1990 North America Cup	
1990–	Gillian Coultard			
**1993: The team becomes incorporated into The Football Association**
–1997	Debbie Bampton		1995 FIFA Women's World Cup	
–2000	Gillian Coultard		UEFA Women's Euro 1995; 1995 FIFA Women's World Cup	
2000–2001	Mo Marley		UEFA Women's Euro 2001	
2001–2002	Tara Proctor		UEFA Women's Euro 2001	Karen Walker; Faye White
2002–2003	Karen Walker		2002 Algarve Cup	Mary Phillip
2002–2012	Faye White		2005 Algarve Cup; UEFA Women's Euro 2005	Mary Phillip; Fara Williams; Casey Stoney
2002–2012	Faye White	Kelly Smith	2007 Four Nations Tournament	
2002–2012	Faye White		2007 FIFA Women's World Cup	
2002–2012	Faye White	Fara Williams; Casey Stoney	**2009 Cyprus Women's Cup**	
2002–2012	Faye White		UEFA Women's Euro 2009; 2010 Cyprus Women's Cup; 2010 Peace Queen Cup; 2011 Cyprus Women's Cup; 2011 FIFA Women's World Cup	Rachel Yankey
2012–2014	Casey Stoney		2012 Cyprus Women's Cup; **2013 Cyprus Women's Cup**; UEFA Women's Euro 2013	Rachel Yankey; Alex Scott; Steph Houghton; Fara Williams; Laura Bassett
2014	(Note: Houghton succeeded Stoney as permanent captain, with no permanent captain and Fara Williams as interim captain during the gap.)	Fara Williams	2014 Cyprus Women's Cup	
2014–2021	Steph Houghton	Fara Williams; Jordan Nobbs	**2015 Cyprus Women's Cup**	Karen Bardsley
2014–2021	Steph Houghton		2015 Yongchuan International Tournament; 2015 FIFA Women's World Cup; 2016 SheBelieves Cup; 2017 SheBelieves Cup; UEFA Women's Euro 2017	Fara Williams; Karen Bardsley; Jordan Nobbs; Jill Scott; Ellen White; Laura Bassett; Lucy Bronze
2014–2021	Steph Houghton	Lucy Bronze	2018 SheBelieves Cup	Keira Walsh
2014–2021	Steph Houghton		2019 FIFA Women's World Cup qualification (UEFA); **2019 SheBelieves Cup**; 2019 FIFA Women's World Cup; 2020 SheBelieves Cup	Lucy Bronze; Keira Walsh; Toni Duggan; Ellen White; Millie Bright; Leah Williamson
2022	(Note: Although Houghton played her last match for England in 2021, no formal interim or permanent captain was named until 2022, with other senior players taking on the armband as reserve captains. Williamson had not yet been named captain for the 2022 Arnold Clark Cup, but captained each game she started and lifted the trophy.)	Leah Williamson	**2022 Arnold Clark Cup**	Ellen White
2022–present	**Leah Williamson**		**UEFA Women's Euro 2022**; **2023 Arnold Clark Cup**; **2023 Women's Finalissima**	Millie Bright; Ellen White; Steph Houghton (Note: Houghton was named a vice-captain but did not wear the armband under Williamson.); Alex Greenwood; Keira Walsh
2022–present	**Leah Williamson**	Millie Bright	2023 FIFA Women's World Cup; 2023–24 UEFA Women's Nations League	Mary Earps
2022–present	**Leah Williamson**		UEFA Women's Euro 2025 qualifying League A; 2025 UEFA Women's Nations League; **UEFA Women's Euro 2025**; 2027 FIFA Women's World Cup qualification – UEFA League A (2026)	Alex Greenwood; Keira Walsh
2022–present	**Leah Williamson**	Keira Walsh	2025 Homecoming Series; 2027 FIFA Women's World Cup qualification – UEFA League A (2026)	

== Captains by age ==
- **Bold** indicates permanent captain of England (not necessarily at time of the relevant match/es)

=== Youngest captains ===
Players who started as captain at under 25 years of age.

#	Player	Date of birth	First captaincy	Age	#W	#M
**Age 20**
1	**Carol Thomas (née McCune)** (Note: WFA era)	5 June 1955	22 May 1976	20 years, 352 days	1	–
**Age 21**
2	Keira Walsh	8 April 1997	4 September 2018	21 years, 149 days	2	–
**Age 22**
3	**Bobby Moore**	12 April 1941	29 May 1963	22 years, 47 days	–	1
4	Jordan Nobbs	8 December 1992	11 March 2015	22 years, 93 days	3	–
5	**Tinsley Lindley**	27 October 1865	4 February 1888	22 years, 100 days	–	2
6	Michael Owen	14 December 1979	17 April 2002	22 years, 124 days	–	3
7	**Cuthbert Ottaway**	20 July 1850	30 November 1872	22 years, 133 days	–	4
8	Jack Hudson	11 October 1860	24 February 1883	22 years, 136 days	–	5
9	**William Rawson**	14 October 1854	3 March 1877	22 years, 140 days	–	6
10	**Percy Walters**	30 September 1863	13 March 1886	22 years, 164 days	–	7
11	Stan Cullis	25 October 1916	24 May 1939	22 years, 211 days	–	8
12	Basil Patchitt	8 August 1900	21 May 1923	22 years, 286 days	–	9
13	**Billy Moon**	7 June 1868	4 April 1891	22 years, 301 days	–	10
**Age 23**
14	**G. O. Smith**	25 November 1872	4 April 1896	23 years, 131 days	–	11
15	**Bob Crompton**	26 September 1879	2 March 1903	23 years, 157 days	–	12
16	Charles Bambridge	30 July 1858	18 February 1882	23 years, 203 days	–	13
17	Marcus Rashford	31 October 1997	6 June 2021	23 years, 218 days	–	14
18	**Stan Harris**	19 July 1881	25 February 1905	23 years, 221 days	–	15
19	**Norman Bailey**	23 July 1857	12 March 1881	23 years, 232 days	–	16
20	Sol Campbell	18 September 1974	29 May 1998	23 years, 253 days	–	17
21	Gerry Francis	6 December 1951	3 September 1975	23 years, 271 days	–	18
22	Eric Dier	15 January 1994	10 November 2017	23 years, 299 days	–	19
23	**Steven Gerrard**	30 May 1980	31 March 2004	23 years, 306 days	–	20
24	**Harry Kane**	28 July 1993	10 June 2017	23 years, 317 days	–	21
25	R. E. Foster	16 April 1878	3 March 1902	23 years, 321 days	–	22
26	**Debbie Bampton**	7 October 1961	22 September 1985	23 years, 350 days	4	–
**Age 24**
27	**Wayne Rooney**	24 October 1985	14 November 2009	24 years, 21 days	–	23
28	**Faye White**	2 February 1978	7 March 2002	24 years, 33 days	5	–
29	**Hubert Heron**	30 January 1852	4 March 1876	24 years, 34 days	–	24
30	**Leah Williamson**	29 March 1997	17 September 2021	24 years, 172 days	6	–
31	Raheem Sterling	8 December 1994	6 June 2019	24 years, 180 days	–	25
32	**Billy Wright**	6 February 1924	9 October 1948	24 years, 246 days	–	26
33	Claude Ashton	19 February 1901	24 October 1925	24 years, 247 days	–	27
34	**Francis Sparks**	4 July 1855	15 March 1880	24 years, 255 days	–	28
35	**George Cotterill**	4 April 1868	25 February 1893	24 years, 327 days	–	29
36	**Sheila Parker** (Note: The FA announced in 2022 that it would award caps to the 1972 first official women's team, including captain Parker.)	1947	18 November 1972	~24 years and 11 months (Note: Parker was appointed captain in 1972 aged 24. She was 74 on 31 December 2021. Provided she was 24 at the time of her first match on 18 November 1972, Parker must have been born in November or December 1947.)	7	–
37	**Arthur Cursham**	14 March 1853	2 March 1878	24 years, 353 days	–	30

=== Oldest captains ===
Players who started as captain at over 35 years of age.

#	Player	Date of birth	Last captaincy	Age	#W	#M
**Age 41+**
1	**Alexander Morten**	1831 or 1832	8 March 1873	41 or 42	–	1
**Age 40**
2	Peter Shilton	18 September 1949	7 July 1990	40 years, 292 days	–	2
**Age 36**
3	**Gillian Coultard**	22 July 1963	13 May 2000	36 years, 296 days	1	–
4	**Jesse Pennington**	23 August 1883	10 April 1920	36 years, 231 days	–	3
5	Frank Lampard	20 June 1978	24 June 2014	36 years, 4 days	–	4
**Age 35**
6	**Debbie Bampton**	7 October 1961	11 May 1997	35 years, 216 days	2	–
7	**Billy Wright**	6 February 1924	28 May 1959	35 years, 111 days	–	5
8	Billy Walker	29 October 1897	7 December 1932	35 years, 39 days	–	6
9	**Stuart Pearce**	24 April 1962	24 May 1997	35 years, 30 days	–	7

== Others ==
=== Disputed captains ===
These players may have officially captained England, but sources are either uncertain or differ.

Player	England career	Caps as captain	Total caps
Harry Daft	1889–1892	**1** or 0	5
Vaughan Lodge	1894–1896	**0** or 1	5
George Raikes	1895–1896	**0** or 1	4
Jimmy Forrest	1884–1890	**0** or 1 (Note: Sources differ on whether Dick Baugh or Jimmy Forrest captained the match against Ireland on 15 March 1890. It would be the first and only captaincy for either man, and was the last game each played for England. Intended captain Bob Howarth was replaced ahead of the match on the day, and did not play.)	11
Dickie Baugh	1886–1890	**0** or 1	2

=== Amateurs ===
For a period after the introduction of professionalism, the England team split into two teams that represented the nation internationally, one only including amateur players. This or other amateur English teams also represented Great Britain at the Olympics, when known as "England" in certain early competitions. (Note: Most of the time, the Amateurs were known as "England Amateurs". Those captains, as well as those representing teams known as "Great Britain", including recent Great Britain Olympic; past United Kingdom; and all British Universiade teams, are not included.)

Amateur men's teams that have represented England internationally
Tenure	Incumbent	Team
1900	Henry Haslam	Upton Park
1908	Vivian Woodward	England amateurs

=== Captains of other non-official teams ===
Before the men's and women's teams each became officially associated, different teams represented them in international tournaments.

Men's teams
Tenure	Incumbent	Team
1870–1871	Charles W. Alcock	England (representative)

Women's teams
Tenure	Incumbent	Team
1920	Alice Kell	Dick, Kerr Ladies
1925	Florrie Redford	Dick, Kerr Ladies
1933	Ethel Audaer	Terry's Ladies
1953	Stella Briggs	Dick, Kerr Ladies
1957–1966	Doris Ashley	Manchester Corinthians/Nomad/All Stars Ladies
1960	Margaret Griffiths	Manchester Corinthians/Nomad/All Stars Ladies
1969–1970	Sue Lopez	British Independents (Note: Women were banned from top flight football in England until 1972, with the early pseudo-international British Independents teams specifically disavowed and blacklisted.)
1971	Carol Wilson	British Independents

- **Bold** indicates tournament winners

Non-official England women's teams' tournament record
Player	Tournament(s) (Note: Tournaments for which the player has been officially named as captain, not including tournaments where they have stepped up as a reserve captain or have been otherwise substituted for a match/es. Only tournaments at continental scale or wider.)
Doris Ashley	**1957 European Cup**; **1960 Torneo Internacional De Futbol Femenino**
Margaret Griffiths	**1960 Torneo Internacional De Futbol Femenino**
Sue Lopez	1969 European Competition for Women's Football; 1970 Women's World Cup
Carol Wilson	1971 Women's World Cup

=== Non-official captains by appearances as captain ===
The following players have never captained England officially, but have started a match as named captain of a team representing England, with the match and/or team not officially recognised:

Only known, confirmed, non-official caps as captain are included.

Player	England career	Caps as captain	First captaincy	Ref(s)
Alice Kell	1920	8+	~April 1920	(Note: Kell was captain for the England-France series in 1920 (four in England, four in France). The third match was played at Hyde Road in Manchester on 6 May 1920.)
Doris Ashley	1957–1966	5+	2 November 1957	
Carol Wilson	1971	4	2 June 1971	
Sue Lopez	1969–1970	2+	1 November 1969	
Florrie Redford	1925	1+	~June 1925	
Margaret Griffiths	1960	1+	April 1960	
Stella Briggs	1952–1953	1+	23 July 1953	
Stanley Briggs	1899	1	23 November 1899	
Ethel Audaer	1933	1	9 August 1933	

=== Others by age ===
- **Bold** indicates permanent captain of England (not necessarily at time of the relevant match/es)

Unofficial young captaincies

Player	Date of birth	First unofficial captaincy	Age
Age 18
Carol Wilson	June 1952	2 June 1971 (Note: Wilson and Lopez' captaincies, which were not authorised and occurred while women's football was still banned in England, are not recognised by any official body.)	~18 years and 11 months
Age 21
Alice Kell	24 June 1898	~April 1920	~21 years and 9 months
Age 24
Sue Lopez	1 September 1945	1 November 1969	24 years, 61 days

Unofficial old captaincies

Player	Date of birth	Last unofficial captaincy	Age
**Doris Ashley**	~1923	17 July 1966	~42
