= Bans of women's association football =

Bans imposed on women's football

Women have played association football since the beginnings of the sport. In a number of countries, however, women's football has historically been subjected to severe restrictions, including outright bans during most of the 20th century. These bans have had a significant impact on the development of the sport.

== Background ==
Following the outbreak of World War I and the subsequent mass mobilisation of women into the workforce, interest in women's football rose rapidly and many teams and tournaments were founded. The interest in the sport continued to grow following the end of the war and into the 1920s. During this period, which has been referred to as a first golden age for women's football, matches were able to attract significant audiences. However, the end of the war also brought with it a backlash against the gains women had made, including legal changes to rollback women's employment, such the Restoration of Pre-War Practices Act 1919, and moral panics, such as over the flapper sub-culture.

== By country ==
=== Afghanistan ===
Following the 2021 Taliban offensive, in which the Taliban re-captured Afghanistan and reestablished the Islamic Emirate, all women's sports were banned in the country, including football. According to the Sport & Rights Alliance, "within days of the Taliban’s 2021 takeover, the new government singled out AWNT players for reprisals. As they scrambled to find an escape from their country, players were forced to burn all evidence of their football careers and go into hiding."

=== Australia ===
In the early 1900s, women's soccer saw significant growth in Australia, with a 1921 match at The Gabba in Brisbane saw attendance of 10,000 spectators. After the English Football Association banned women's soccer that year, however, the English ban was soon replicated across Australia. The ban would endure until the 1960s.

=== Belgium ===
The Royal Belgian Football Association instituted a ban on women's football in the 1920s, citing medical reasons. The ban would last until late-1970, when the Association announced that men's clubs would be allowed to establish women's sections. However, the Association put in place several restrictions on women's games, including limiting the game to two 35-minutes halves without extra time instead of two 45-minutes halves, making players take corner kicks from the edge of the penalty area instead of the corner area, and limiting the size of the ball to that used by U12 boys players.

=== Brazil ===
Throughout the 1920s and 1930s, women's football in Brazil underwent a period of significant growth, led by figures such as the journalist Cléo de Galsan and manager Carlota Alves de Resende. By 1940, there was at least 15 women's clubs in Brazil and the sport was achieving mainstream popularity, including matches being held at the Pacaembu Stadium that attracted tens of thousands of spectators, an international tour against women's clubs through South America being planned, and preliminary discussions being held to create a professional women's league.

However, in 1937, the conservative and authoritarian Estado Novo had been established by President Getúlio Vargas, and conservatives in the country began campaigning against the sport. These campaigners claimed that it posed a threat to the health of potential mothers and would cause a deterioration of social norms. Vargas subsequently ordered the Ministry of Health to investigate the concerns. In January 1941, de Resende was arrested by the Brazilian authorities and accused of financially and sexually exploiting the players in the clubs she managed. The following week, Brazilian authorities announced they would block the planned South American tour and the government's Department of Press and Propaganda announced that it would begin censoring reporting on women's football. In April 1941, the Ministry of Health issued Decree-law 3,199, which banned women from taking part in sports "incompatible with the conditions of their nature," including football. As a result, existing women's teams were forcibly disbanded and attempts to establish new teams were blocked.

During the following years, some women would campaign against the ban, and some informal women's matches were held in defiance of the ban, especially beginning in the late 1950s. The ban received support from João Havelange, head of the Brazilian Sports Confederation from 1958 to 1973 and afterwards President of FIFA until 1998. In 1965, following the 1964 Brazilian coup d'état, the military dictatorship in Brazil announced that it would maintain the ban, and the ban subsequently became a target of feminist resistance to the dictatorship.

In 1979, the dictatorship lifted the ban. However, new teams and competitions that had been founded after the end of the ban soon encountered significant prejudice, sometimes violent, and by 2001, all the national women's competitions in the country had folded. It would take until 2013 for the Campeonato Brasileiro de Futebol Feminino Série A1 to be established.

=== Brunei ===
Under a fatwa issued in 1974, women's football is currently banned in the country.

=== Canada ===
The Dominion of Canada Football Association voted to ban women's football on 5 September 1922, following the ban in England.

=== Czechoslovakia ===
In April 1957, the Czechoslovak Football Association implemented a ban on women's football, stating that it was "not healthy."

=== Denmark ===
Following the 1971 Women's World Cup, in which the unofficial Danish national team were champions, the Danish Football Union (DBU) announced that it would continue to ban women from football. DBU chair Vilhelm Skousen declared that the ban would last as long as he lived, saying that "we cannot and will not take [women's football] seriously." However, the following year, UEFA ruled that national associations had to incorporate women's football, and the Danish ban was lifted. The DBU subsequently disestablished the unofficial competitions and teams the players were forced to sign up to an entirely new system created from scratch. The DBU further instituted a rule that Danish teams could only compete internationally against other officially-recognised teams, limiting the options available to the new official women's teams.

=== France ===
In 1919, the French Football Federation formally declared that it would not admit women, but did not formally ban the sport. In response, the Fédération des sociétés féminines sportives de France (FSFSF), which had been formed in 1917, began to organise women's football competitions. The FSFSF continued to oversee women's football until 1933, when the French Football Federation formally instituted a ban on women's football. Some unofficial competitions would continue until 1941, when the fascist Vichy government made women's football illegal. The ban was also applied to all the territories of the French colonial empire.

Following the end of World War II, the French Football Federation continued the ban, despite some attempts by women to re-establish the sport in the late 1940s and again in the mid-1960s. It would take until March 1970 for the Federation to lift its ban on women's football. When the ban was lifted, however, the Federation initially imposed a number of limits on the sport, including shorter match lengths and smaller balls. Mixed gender matches would remain banned.

=== Germany ===
==== Cold War ====
In West Germany, the idea of organising women's football competitions surged after the men's national team won the 1954 FIFA World Cup. In response, the German Football Association (DFB) imposed a ban on women's football in 1955. To justify the ban, the DFB claimed that the roughness of the sport would damage women's fertility and health as well as representing an event inappropriate for public viewing, saying that "in the fight for the ball, female grace disappears, body and soul are inevitably damaged, and the public parading of the body is offensive and indecent." The ban was met with resistance, particularly following the advent of the West German student movement in the late-1960s, but attempts to organise matches were often broken up by police. The ban was lifted on 31 October 1970, as the DFB concluded that if it did not take control of and institutionalise the sport within the DFB then, there was a growing risk that it might never be able to. Following the end of the ban, the DFB initially imposed a number of restrictions on women's matches, including limiting the playing time to two 30-minute halves, only allowing matches to be organised during warm weather, disallowing the use of studs on football boots, and disallowing the display of sponsorships on football shirts. It would take until 1982 for the DFB to form West Germany women's national football team.

Unlike the West German authorities, the Deutscher Fußball-Verband der DDR did not impose a ban on women's football in East Germany, however, early attempts to set up teams were met with obstruction from officials. In 1969, the Socialist Unity Party of Germany decreed that only men's football was eligible for funding as an elite sport. The East Germany women's national football team would only ever play a single match, in May 1990.

=== Iran ===
Women's football began to emerge in Iran during the late 1960s. In 1970, the Iranian government formally allowed women to use football fields without being accompanied by men. In 1971, the Taj Ladies Football Club became the first official women's club to be established, and the Iran women's national football team playing its first match. Following the Iranian Revolution and the establishment of the Islamic Republic of Iran in 1979, however, all women's sports in Iran were banned. The ban would last until the late 1980s, when women's sports in the country were gradually revived, particularly under the initiative of Faiza Rafsanjani, daughter of the Irainian President Akbar Hashemi Rafsanjani. In the late-1990s, the first official women's match since the Iranian Revolution was held, and the national women's team was reformed in 2005.

=== Malaysia ===
In mid-1961, the Johor Bahru FA denied that it would allow women's football competitions to be organised, saying that "we don't want to make it a spectacle. It is certainly not a game for women."

=== Netherlands ===
In 1896, Sparta Rotterdam attempted to organise a women's football team to play in a friendly against the British Ladies' Football Club. However, the Royal Dutch Football Association (KNVB) argued that the match would damage the sport's reputation and ordered the club to cancel the match. The KNVB continued to ban women's football until 1971.

Women's football in the Netherlands would continue to face discrimination following the lifting of the ban. Annelies Knoppers and Anton Anthonissen of the University of Utrecht have noted that the KNVB "initially did little to promote women’s soccer," including organising little in the way of formal competitive structures and setting a minimum age of 14 for girls to participate in formally organised youth teams.

=== Nigeria ===
==== Colonial Nigeria ====
During the early 1940s, women's football began a period of significant growth in Nigeria. After the British colonial administration allowed several charity matches to be held to raise funds for the war effort, the success of those matches (including high attendance, positive press coverage, and positive community effects) led women to begin organising their own teams and their own competitive matches. By the late 1940s, the colonial administration began to see this growth as a threat - according to Chuka Onwumechili of Howard University, the authorities believed they "had to take action. Not to do so, in the thinking of the colonial authorities was to surrender to native insurrection and disrespect for constituted authority. The colonialists were experiencing African natives violating the colonial sporting participation rules that were carefully outlined along sex lines. This challenge by the natives to colonial authority was not a simple matter. It was a major matter and the colonialists had to stamp their authority and keep the natives in line." In July 1950, therefore, the colonial administration banned the sport, citing the 1921 ban in England as precedent and claiming that if it did not ban women's football, its efforts to organise men's football could face international censure. However, the ban was met with resistance, with a number of teams continuing to play, and ultimately came to an end with Nigerian independence in October 1960.

==== 21st century ====
In 2000, under the governorship of Ahmad Sani Yerima, Zamfara State introduced a ban on women's football as part of the implementation of Sharia into its legal system. In 2003, Niger State became the second Nigerian state to introduce a ban on women's football, with Governor Abdulkadir Kure stating that "I don't see anything rewarding about it as it is not in conformity with our culture."

=== Norway ===
In 1931, IF Fløya applied to the Norwegian Football Federation to start a women's team, but was banned by the Federation from establishing the team, with the Federation saying that the "football was for men only, and clubs should not let women play on their pitches, and referees should not referee women matches." It would take until the late-1960s for independent women's teams to be established, particularly with the leadership of Målfrid Kuvås, and until 1978 for the Federation to establish the Norway women's national football team.

=== Paraguay ===
Women's football was banned in Paraguay until 1979.

=== Saudi Arabia ===
Women's football began to emerge in Saudi Arabia in the mid-2000s, but faced significant discrimination and legal barriers. In 2008, the government of Saudi Arabia explicitly banned the creation of an official national women's team. The ban would last until the late 2010s, following the accession of Mohammed bin Salman to power and the reforms he implemented. In 2018, women were allowed to attend football matches as spectators for the first time. In 2022, the Saudi Arabia women's national football team played its first game.

=== Soviet Union ===
Following the Russian Revolutions and the established Soviet Union in 1917, women's sports including football saw significant growth during the 1920s. However, after Joseph Stalin's rise to power, women's participation in some sports, such as football, began to be discouraged by the Soviet authorities. This discouragement would last throughout most of the Soviet Union's history. In 1973, following complaints of a women's tournament held in Dnipropetrovsk as women's football began to re-emerge in the country, the Soviet Federation of Sports Medicine published a statement warning against women's participation in football, saying that it posed a health risk to women, as the "physical stress typical of playing soccer can cause harm to sexual functions, varicose veins, thrombophlebitis, and so on," with the State Committee for Physical Culture and Sport subsequently announcing a ban on women's football. The ban would last until the Gorbachev era, with the first national championship being played in mid 1987 and the Soviet Union women's national football team being formed shortly afterwards.

=== Spain ===
A number of women's football teams had been formed in Spain during the Second Spanish Republic. However, under the far-right Francoist dictatorship that began in parts of the country with the Spanish coup of July 1936 and over the entire country in 1939, women's football was banned. Luis Agostí, an advisor to the Sección Femenina de Falange, stated that women should not "participate in sports like men, but rather to do so in accordance with their own forms of expression," as sports like football "demanded qualities that were diametrically opposed to those of women’s bodily constitution." As the dictatorship began its decline in the late-1960s, women's football began to see a return, with several unofficial matches being organised. The government attempted to repress the sport, with the Sección Femenina ordering its members in 1971 to "abstain from promoting any activities related to women’s football," with doctors distributing disinformation about the impact of the game on fertility, and with the government refusing to allow the Federation of Independent European Female Football to host the successor to the 1971 Women's World Cup in 1972, leading to the cancellation of the tournament. Following the Spanish transition to democracy in the late-1970s, the ban came to an end, and the Spain women's national football team was officially formed in 1980.

=== United Kingdom ===
==== England ====
During the 1910s, women's football in the UK saw a significant surge in growth which would continue past the end of World War I and into the 1920s. During this period, women's matches often attracted thousands of spectators, with the top teams, such as Dick, Kerr Ladies F.C., attracting audiences in the tens of thousands. Many of these matches were played for charity, often raising thousands of pounds.

However, The Football Association viewed the growth and success of women's football with distrust and increasingly saw it as a rival competitor to men's profits, particularly as the FA had announced a significant expansion of the men's English Football League in 1920. As well, the FA had little control over the finances of women's matches and was opposed to the charity matches that had been played in support of workers taking strike actions, such as during the Miners' Federation of Great Britain lockout. As a result, on 5 December 1921, the FA imposed a ban on women's football, stating that "the game of football is quite unsuitable for females and ought not to be encouraged" and alleging that "an excessive proportion of the receipts are absorbed in expenses and an inadequate percentage devoted to charitable objects." When women's teams attempted to continue to organise matches on non-football grounds, such as on cricket or rugby grounds, the FA further pressured the organisations in charge of those grounds to deny women permission. The English ban was also endorsed by several football associations elsewhere in the British Empire, such as the Queensland Football Association and the Dominion of Canada Football Association.

The ban was assessed in Barcelona newspaper La Jornada Deportiva in 1923, asking if the FA were trying to be anti-feminist or just wanted "British modesty" to prevail, or if they really found the sport to be too tiring and hard on women. According to Christchurch newspaper The Star in 1922, the head of the Canterbury Football Association stated that "the men in England had tried to stop the ladies from playing soccer for the simple reason that it affected their gate takings."

In 1952, the Durham County Football Association blocked the application of schoolteacher Jean Tizard to sit the examination for referees on grounds of her gender. In December 1962, an independent women's club based in Accrington made an application to be recognised by the FA. The FA denied the request, saying that "It may well be that after 41 years women have a better idea how to control the finances of a match, but they have not changed their shape. Soccer is not a game for girls."

In 1969, the Women's Football Association was formed with representatives of over 40 different independent clubs. In 1971, the FA announced that the ban on women's football would be lifted. The WFA would formally affiliate itself to the FA in 1983, and in 1993, the FA took over direct responsibility for women's football.

==== Scotland ====
In 1902, the Scottish Football Association (SFA) implemented a rule restricting men's teams from playing charity matches against women's teams, following the lead of the FA, which had recommended its teams against participating in such matches. In 1921, the SFA followed the FA once more in implementing a total ban on women's football.

In late-1971, when UEFA proposed requiring its member associations to formally incorporate women's football, the SFA was the only member association to vote against the proposal.

==== Wales ====
In March 1922, following complaints from religious congregations, the Football Association of Wales also implemented a total ban. However, the ban was initially less comprehensive and less consistently applied than in England, with John Crichton-Stuart, 4th Marquess of Bute authorising Dick, Kerr Ladies F.C. to hold a charity match against Olympic de Paris just three weeks after the FAW announced the ban. The match, held at Cardiff Arms Park, attracted an audience of 15,000 and raised funds for the restoration of Reims Cathedral. In 1939, the FAW instituted a stronger version of the ban, decreeing that "no football match in which any lady or ladies take part in any way whatsoever shall be permitted to be played on any football ground within the jurisdiction of this Association. Clubs, officials, players or referees are not permitted to associate themselves in any way whatsoever with Ladies Football matches." The ban was lifted on 29 May 1970.

=== United States ===
==== Colorado ====
When soccer was established as a high school sport in the state of Colorado, the Colorado High School Activities Association banned schools from establishing girls' teams, saying "because inordinate injury risk jeopardizes the health and safety of the female athlete, participation in this activity is limited to members of the male sex." However, the ban was rescinded later in the 1970s after Donna Hoover, a 16-year-old at Golden High School sued the state in the Hoover v. Meiklejohn lawsuit.

=== Yugoslavia ===
In 1939, the government of the Kingdom of Yugoslavia announced that women would not be allowed to organise football competitions, stating that "football, together with other field sports involving heavy and violent exercise of the body muscles is calculated to damage women's health seriously, and cannot therefore be allowed."

== Impact ==
The banning of women's football severely stunted the growth of the sport, in some countries effectively killing the sport entirely for decades, and to have forced the sport to effectively restart from zero in the late-20th century. Writer David Goldblatt has stated that the bans had the effect of reducing women's football "to a tiny and stigmatised subculture subsisting in the marginal spaces of municipal recreation grounds." Furthermore, even after the bans were lifted, the levels of investment into the sport have often been significantly lower than they had been prior to the bans. As the sport had grown during its first golden age to the point where matches attracted similar audiences to men's games, the bans have been cited as a major factor in the gap in popularity between the sport and its male counterparts. Some have also attributed the dominance of the United States (where association football has struggled at various times throughout its history) at the FIFA Women's World Cup and the Olympics to the long lasting effects of the bans by traditional football powerhouses compared to well funded and early adoption of women's programs in the United States.

Simon Kuper and economist Stefan Szymanski, authors of Soccernomics, have argued that the bans on women's football would today represent violations of competition law and that the associations that imposed bans should be retrospectively fined damages, with the money being used to invest into the women's game. Kuper and Szymanski further added that women's football was not just "some potential untapped market, but a business sector that was regularly selling tens of thousands of match tickets. These revenues would surely have grown over time, as men’s revenues did." The record attendance for a women's football domestic match set by Dick, Kerr Ladies F.C. and St. Helen's Ladies F.C. in December 1920, with a 53,000 attendance at Goodison Park and an extra 15,000 waiting outside of the grounds, would last until 2019, when a Primera División match between Atlético Madrid Femenino and FC Barcelona Femení at the Metropolitano Stadium saw attendance of 60,739.

Belinda Scarlett of the National Football Museum has stated that the bans "perpetuated the myth that football is not a women's game, which is something women still fight for today," adding that women's football still has to struggle "for pitch space, for financial support, for media coverage." Research by Stacey Pope of Durham University has found that many of the same attitudes that men used to justify bans of women's football in the 1920s are still widespread today. A 2020 paper by Lisa Jenkel of the University of Groningen that press coverage of bans of women's football in the 1920s portrayed the sport as a threat to the "natural, biological order of the sexes" and on the "compatibility of women’s football and contemporary gender norms." Jenkel further found that in contemporary social media discourse around women's football, "sexualisation of players and spectators, dismissing women’s matches as ‘unwatchable’ or disputing the game being a sport, are seemingly still part of some mindsets."

== See also ==
- Dick, Kerr Ladies 4–0 St Helens Ladies
