= Carmen Pomiès =

French athlete (1900–1982)

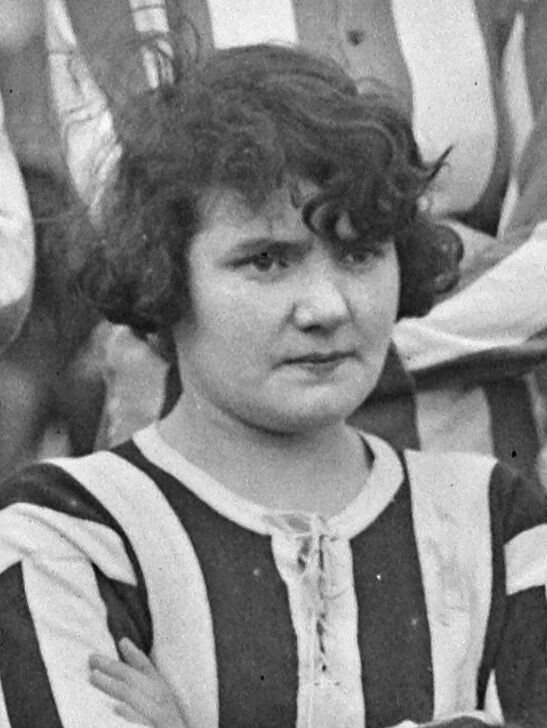
- Pomiès at a Fémina Sport match in 1928

Personal information
- Full name: Carmen Charlotte Marianne Pomiès
- Born: 29 September 1900 14th arrondissement of Paris, France
- Died: 29 September 1982 (aged 82) Champcueil, France

Sport
- Country: France
- Sport: Javelin throw, association football
- Position: Centre-back, full back
- League: FSFSF
- Team: France

Football clubs, playing
- 1918–1921: Fémina Sport
- 1921–1922: Dick, Kerr Ladies
- 1922–1940: Fémina Sport

Achievements and titles
- Olympic finals: 1921 Women's Olympiad': Javelin, two-handed; Bronze

Carmen Charlotte Marianne Pomiès (29 September 1900 – 29 September 1982) was a French javelin thrower and international association football player in the 1910s to 1930s, and a member of the French Resistance during World War II.

== Early life ==
Pomiès was born in the 14th arrondissement of Paris. She had a younger brother, Georges Pomiès, who would become an actor and modern dancer, and an older sister, Hélène, who became a writer.

== Athletic career ==
=== Javelin ===
Pomiès won the bronze medal in the two-handed javelin throw event at the 1921 Women's Olympiad in Monte Carlo, behind her compatriot Violette Morris who took gold.

=== Football ===
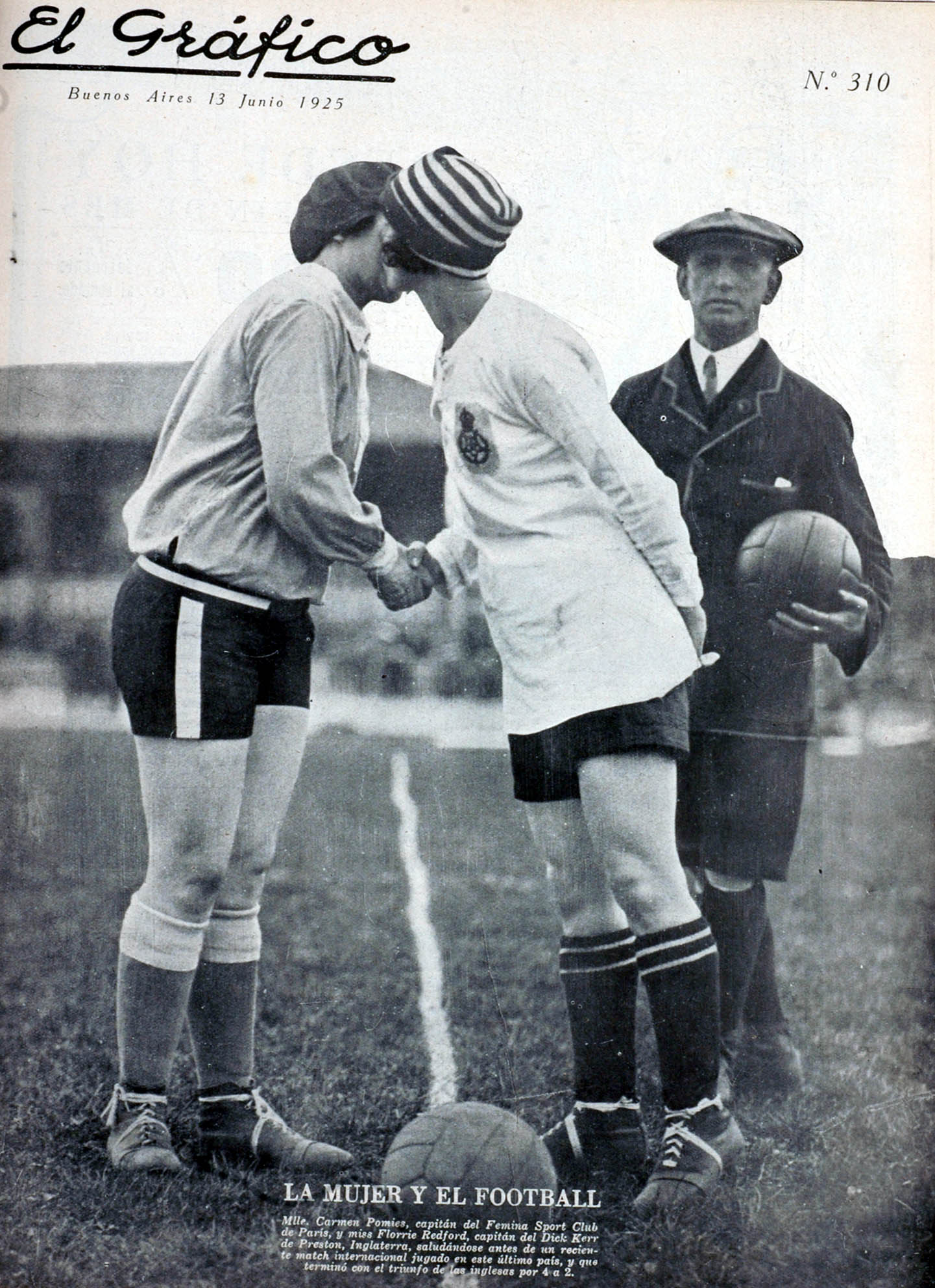
A cover of El Gráfico magazine depicts Pomiès, left, kissing Florrie Redford before a match in 1925.

Pomiès joined Fémina Sport, a women's association football club, upon its creation in 1918 and played centre-back. After Fémina won its first French championship against a club named Academia, she was named to a combined French national team of players from Fémina, En Avant, and Les Sportives for its first international tour in 1920. The French team travelled to England to face Dick, Kerr Ladies across a five-match series, where it won one match, drew another, and lost two. One of the matches, France's sole win of the tour, on 6 May 1920 was the first international women's match played at Stamford Bridge.

During the tour, Pomiès fostered friendships with Dick, Kerr players Florrie Redford and Lizzy Ashcroft. Following a return tour of France by Dick, Kerr, and then another French tour of England in 1921, Pomiès stayed in Preston to join Dick, Kerr for a year. She debuted with the team on 8 August 1921 against St. Helens A.F.C. and travelled with the team on its 1922 tour of the United States. Pomiès moved from centre-back to goalkeeper on the tour, and her 11-save performance on 8 October 1922 in a 4–4 draw against a men's team in Washington, D.C. was noted in reports of the match.

Pomiès returned to France, joined by Dick, Kerr player Redford, and took on captaincy of Fémina Sport. Her club returned to England in another 10-match Gallery of Champions tour in May 1925, winning one match, drawing two, and losing seven. The photo of Pomiès as the French captain and Redford as the English captain during the 1925 tour was reproduced around the world, and filmed footage from a match at the Herne Hill Velodrome was widely viewed and preserved.

By 1932, Pomiès had succeeded Madeleine Bracquemond as team captain for both Fémina and France. She captained Fémina against an Irish team featuring Molly Seaton on 4 August 1932, scoring the opening goal in a 4–3 win despite being injured in the first half. She also captained France against Ireland in a 4–1 victory on 10 August 1936. As of 1933, she had reportedly played in every French national team match.

Pomiès continued to tour with France and Fémina Sport, and play in matches against Dick, Kerr Ladies (later known as Preston), through at least 1938.

== After sports ==
=== French Resistance in World War II ===
Women's football was prohibited under the Nazi Germany occupation of France during World War II. Pomiès by then had become the secretary to film actress Renée Saint-Cyr. During the war, she worked in a maternity hospital in occupied Paris, and as a liaison with German officers who confirmed requests to leave the occupied zone. In the former role, she reportedly hid airdrops of British propaganda in hospital beds, and in the latter acquired exit passes for the National Council of the Resistance. She also joined the French Forces of the Interior in Paris.

=== Life in America ===
After the war, Pomiès returned to Preston in 1946 as part of a French effort to re-establish international sporting events. She then took an ocean liner to the United States and settled in Rochester, New York, in 1947, where she was a translator for Teale Machine Company, whose executives included friends from Pomiès's childhood. She was also a competitive tennis player at the Tennis Club of Rochester, winning the city's championships in 1947 and 1950. In 1950, she moved to New York City to work as a translator for the United Nations.

In 1954, Pomiès gained American citizenship.

== Death ==
Pomiès died in Champcueil, France, on her 82nd birthday in 1982.

== Biographies ==
- Rowe, Chris. (2022), Carmen Pomiés: Football Legend and Heroine of the French Resistance, Pen & Sword Books Limited, ISBN 978-1-399-09170-1
- Newsham, Gail J. (1994), In a League of their Own! The Dick, Kerr Ladies 1917–1965, Pride of Place UK Limited, ISBN 1-85727-029-0
