= A Woman's Game =

- Author: Suzanne Wrack
- Original title: A Woman's Game: The Rise, Fall, and Rise Again of Women's Football
- Language: English
- Subject: History of women's association football
- Publication date: 16 June 2022
- Publication place: United Kingdom
- Pages: 256
- ISBN: 9781783352159

A Woman's Game: The Rise, Fall, and Rise Again of Women's Football is a 2022 book by the British journalist Suzanne Wrack. It is a history of women's association football in Britain from the Victorian era to the present, and was Wrack's first book.

== Reception ==
Reviewing the book for The Times Literary Supplement, Fiona Skillen wrote that it draws more than 140 years of scattered history into a single narrative. She also wrote that Wrack places the sport within a wider social frame. The boon connects the experiences of women footballers to changes in female employment, legislation protecting women's rights, and access to contraception. Skillen described the history of the women's game as long overlooked.

Writing in The Spectator, Simon Kuper said the decline of women's football can be dated precisely to Boxing Day 1920, when Dick, Kerr Ladies beat St Helens Ladies 4–0 at Goodison Park before a sell-out crowd of 53,000 – a success he described as intolerable to The Football Association, which banned women from playing the game the following year.

== Awards ==
The book won the Vikki Orvice Award for Women's Sports Writing at the Sports Book Awards in 2023.
