= Lizzy Ashcroft =

English footballer (1905–1973)

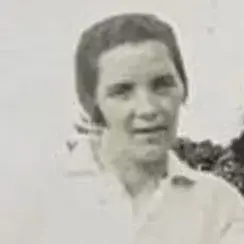
- Born: 1905; St Helens
- Died: 1973 (aged 67–68)
- Occupation: Footballer
- Years active: 1921–1936
- Height: 1.73 m (5 ft 8 in)
- Spouse: Joshua (1936–)
- Children: 2

Lizzy Ashcroft (1905 – 1973) was an English footballer who is considered a pioneer of the women's game. She is regarded as one of the preeminent pre-World War Two women's footballers.

== Early life ==
Ashcroft was a native of Parr, St Helens. She was born in about 1905 as one of twelve children in a working-class family.

== Career ==
Ashcroft made her footballing debut in April 1921, aged 16, when St Helens Ladies FC played against Dick, Kerr Ladies at St Andrews. She later joined the Dick, Kerr team, becoming vice captain in 1933 and taking over from Lily Parr as captain in 1935. After participating in the Dick, Keer Ladies tour of France later that year, Ashcroft retired from football in 1936 to get married.

In total, Ashcroft spent fifteen years playing for St Helens Ladies FC and Dick, Kerr Ladies.

== Style of play ==
Known for her height and strength, Ashcroft mainly operated as a full-back. She was known as the "best defender since Alice Kell" but she could also play in an attacking role when required.

== Personal life ==
In 1926 Ashcroft joined the Whittingham County Mental Asylum in Goosnargh as a nurse. In 1936 she married her husband Joshua, who died just twelve years later. They had two children. She rarely spoke to her family about her time as a footballer, although they later described her as a "life-long lover of football" and recalled her watching Match of the Day every weekend.

== Death and legacy ==
After Ashcroft's death in 1973, her grandson Steve Bolton found cases of photographs and documents in his father's attic, which inspired him to write an article about her and publish it online. After reading the article, local actress Michelle Crane wrote a short film, Granny, exploring both Ashcroft's career and how her family came to rediscover it. The film premiered at the Genesis Cinema in London in 2022 and was later accepted at the New York Independent Film Festival.

Bolton donated his grandmother's photographs to the National Football Museum in Manchester. Several of Ashcroft's photographs are featured in a permanent exhibition at the museum about Lily Parr, which opened in 2021 to mark the 100th anniversary of the FA's ban on women's football. Items from the Ashcroft collection were featured in an exhibition celebrating the history of women's football at the Queen's Theatre in Hornchurch in 2023.

In 2025 a blue plaque was placed in her memory in St Helens.
