= Rutherglen Ladies F.C. =

Rutherglen Ladies
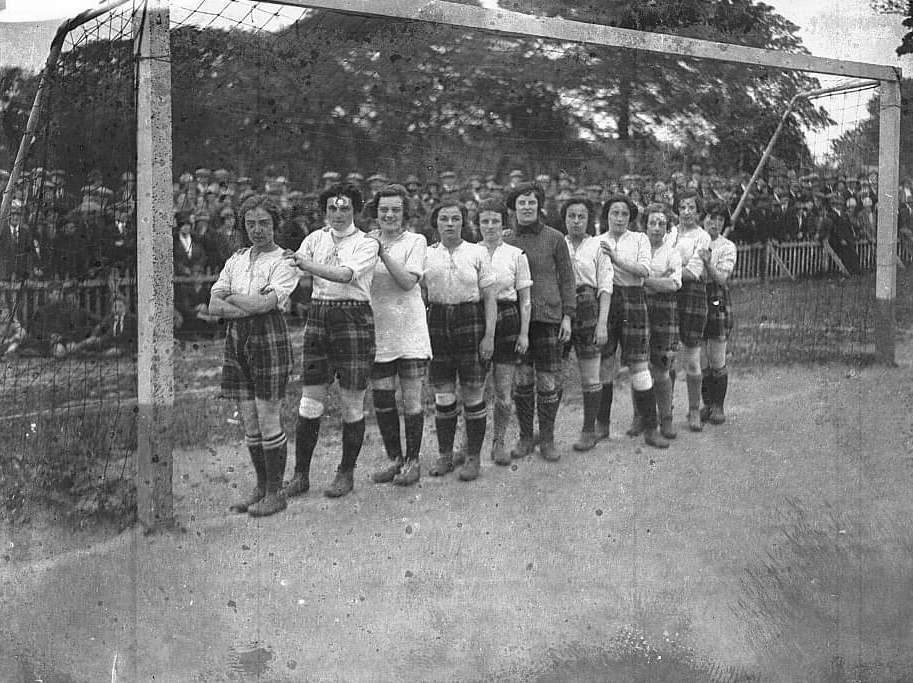
- Rutherglen Ladies FC on an Irish tour
- Full name: Rutherglen Ladies Football Club
- Founded: 1921
- Dissolved: 1939

Rutherglen Ladies Football Club was one of the earliest known women's association football teams in Scotland. English teams faced strong opposition by the Football Association (FA), who banned the women from using fields and stadiums controlled by FA-affiliated clubs in 1921. Scottish teams did not have this impediment between the wars and they played before thousands in matches that raised money for charities.

== Origins ==
British teams could attract crowds of over 50,000.

=== FA ban (1921) and Scottish FA position ===
The popularity of women's team matches led the Football Association (FA) to ban women's football at its members' grounds on 5 December 1921. This ban applied only in England and the Scottish FA did not make a similar bar until 20 years later. However the Scottish FA refused requests by Scottish clubs Raith Rovers (Kirkcaldy), Aberdeen and Queen of the South (Dumfries) to host women's football matches in 1924 and 1925.

The resolution passed by the FA's Consultative Committee in England said that after complaints they had decided that the game was "unsuitable for females and should not be encouraged", that they believed that charity matches gave little to charity, and instructed that: "Clubs belonging to the Association refuse the use of their grounds for such matches".

Because of the ban, women's games in England were relegated to smaller capacity fields with less resources and exposure.

== "World Champions" ==
Rutherglen Ladies was a team led by founder and manager James H. Kelly and based in Rutherglen near Glasgow. They played at grounds that were outside the remit of the FA's ban and they generally played matches in aid of charities. They were still able to appear at Scottish grounds and they attracted crowds of thousands.

In 1923 they were playing matches close to home at Lanark, Kilsyth, Linlithgow, Bellshill and Carluke against a team called the "Cinema Girls". They had a captain named Sadie Smith who was a skilful footballer.

In September 1923 Rutherglen played a match against the leading English side Dick, Kerr Ladies at Shawfield Park in Rutherglen. Unusually the Dick, Kerr team was beaten by the Scottish team 2–0. Kelly declared his team "World Champions" following the match. It is speculated that the defeat prevented any rematch as Kerr's team were expected to win their matches. The title of "World Champions" was still used in Dick Kerr's advertising and in 1925 Kerr's team was claiming to be World Champions from 1917 to 1925.

Rutherglen played at Dundee United's Tannadice Park in 1924 before a crowd of 4,000 spectators, demonstrating the SFA ban was not absolute. The account in the Dundee Courier singled out the performances of captain Sadie Smith and Ms. Crozier.

In 1927 Rutherglen went on a tour to Ireland. The team's captain was still Sadie Smith (who researchers later found was the grandmother of musician Eddi Reader) who led the team against an Irish select team whose star was Molly Seaton. The teams had already played four games against each other in Scotland (the fourth match was just over the border into England at Berwick) when the Irish team had been billed as being from Edinburgh.

The Rutherglen team was disbanded in 1939.

== In popular culture ==
Following research into their history, in 2021 the Scottish Football Museum opened an exhibition dedicated to the Rutherglen club and celebrating how the team had defied the ban 100 years before. The exhibition was opened by leading footballer Rose Reilly, Vivienne MacLaren Chairperson of Scottish Women's Football and Eddi Reader.

== See also ==
- Scottish Women's Football
- British Ladies' Football Club
