= Dick, Kerr Ladies 4–0 St Helens Ladies =

Dick, Kerr Ladies Boxing Day match
- The match took place at Goodison Park (pictured in 1905)
Dick, Kerr Ladies	St Helens Ladies
4	0
- Date: 27 December 1920
- Venue: Goodison Park, Liverpool
- Player of the Match: Alice Kell
- Referee: Stan Peers
- Attendance: 53,000

On 27 December 1920, (Note: Advertised as a Boxing Day match, it was played on 27 December, as 26 December fell on a Sunday in 1920.) Dick, Kerr Ladies beat St Helens Ladies 4–0 at Goodison Park in front of 53,000 spectators, an attendance figure for a women's club football match that would not be exceeded for 99 years, and for a women's club football match in the United Kingdom that would not be exceeded for 103 years.

Threatened by the continued popularity of women's football after male players returned from the First World War, the Football Association would shortly afterwards ban women's football in England, a restriction that lasted 50 years.

== Background ==
Boxing Day football has been a popular institution in the United Kingdom since the early days of the sport. During the First World War, when men could typically not play football, people sought a way for the sport to continue; teams were formed comprising women, who had taken the place of men in other jobs. The most popular team was Dick, Kerr Ladies, a team from the Dick, Kerr & Co. munitions factory in Preston, with most of the players being factory workers. Dick, Kerr Ladies' first match had been on Christmas Day 1917, with 10,000 spectators; the next day (Boxing Day), twice as many people showed out at Grosvenor Park to watch a representative England vs Ireland women's match.

In 1920, Dick, Kerr Ladies were considered the best team in the country, with St Helens Ladies the second-best. Dick, Kerr Ladies were also immensely popular and St Helens Ladies could be considered their local rivals.

== Venue and attendance ==
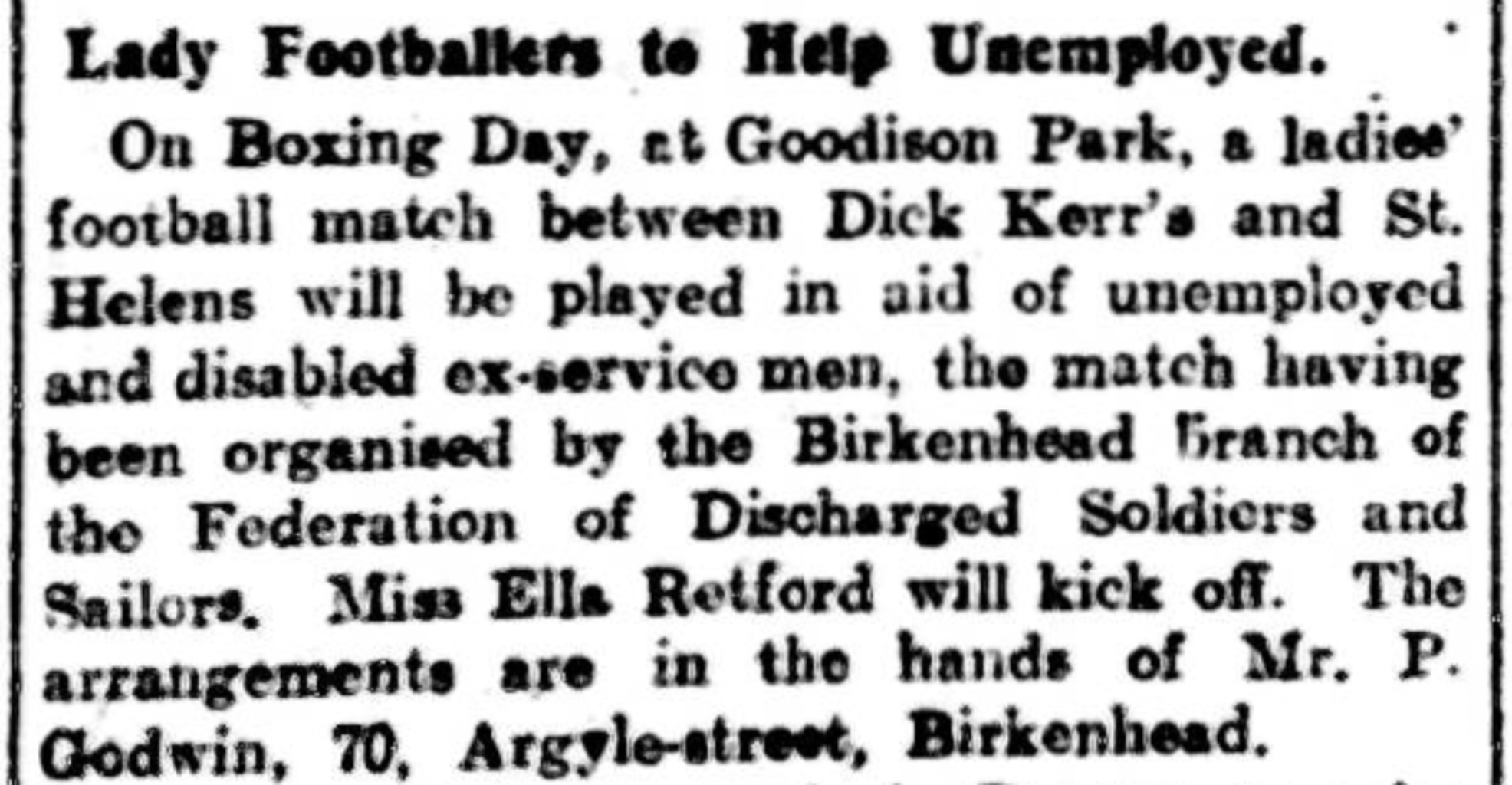
A newspaper advertisement for the match

The match took place at Goodison Park, a stadium in Liverpool that had no official capacity at the time, but had held a record ~60,000 spectators in 1910 for the men's FA Cup Final replay; the stadium had seen 35,000 spectators for its 1920 Christmas Day match between its resident men's team, Everton, and London team Arsenal. Later on Boxing Day 1920, the (men's) Everton Reserves played local rivals Southport at Goodison, to a crowd of just over 5,000.

A reported 53,000 people were allowed into the stadium for the women's 1920 Boxing Day match, with 14,000 more away fans prevented from entering. The players were so popular that a police escort was required to help them through the crowds of fans outside as they made their way into the stadium, with British-Pathé sending cameras to record the game from the touchlines; despite this, the crowd had not been expected to be so large, with additional turnstiles needing to be opened to cope.

== Match summary ==
The match was kicked off by Ella Retford, a popular stage actress who was headlining at the Liverpool Empire Theatre at the time. Dick, Kerr's starting striker, Florrie Redford, missed her train to the match and was replaced in the line-up by her usual attacking partner Jennie Harris, who scored the opening goal. Captain Alice Kell, right-back, moved to play as a forward in place of Redford for the second half and scored a hat-trick, with the match ending 4–0 in favour of Dick, Kerr Ladies. St Helens' goalkeeper, Edith Waine, worked hard to keep more balls out. The players were praised, as was the attendance and the amount raised for charity.

== Match details ==
27 December 1920
11:00 GMT

Dick, Kerr Ladies	4–0	St Helens Ladies
Harris; Kell	Report

Goodison Park, Liverpool
Attendance: 53,000
Referee: Stan Peers

Dick, Kerr Ladies	St Helens Ladies

Annie Hastie
Alice Kell (c)
Lily Parr
Alice Woods
Jessie Walmsley
Sally Hulme
Florrie Haslam
Jennie Harris
Alice Mills
Lily Lee
Daisy Clayton
Manager:
Alfred Frankland

Edith Waine
M. Makin
F. Gee
E. Britch
M. Ransome
Swift
Davies
N. Johnson
Scott
E. Woods
F. Hayes
Manager:
Mr Gordon

== Aftermath ==
=== Charity ===
The match was held to raise money for injured soldiers, specifically for the Discharged and Demobilised Sailors and Soldiers Association. It achieved £3,100 (over £135,250 in 2018), a record gate income for a women's game. After the match, the Lord Mayor of Liverpool presented the Dick, Kerr team with a medal in recognition of their fundraising efforts.

=== Legacy ===
Unsettled by the women's football match attracting more spectators than men's clubs after the latter had returned from war (the 1920 men's FA Cup final saw 50,018 spectators), the Football Association (FA) took steps to put men's football back in the spotlight. Proposed reasons for the FA's discomfort with women's football include: lower crowds for men's matches on the same day as women's threatening the legitimacy of men's football; large crowds encouraging women's suffrage campaigns; the idea that sports, and otherwise continuing men's jobs after the war, diminished women's femininity; the charity fundraising being too close to an organised labour movement for comfort; the FA believing large crowds made women playing football "too showbiz"; and concern that increased spectators encouraged women footballers to play too rough for their supposedly fragile bodies. On 5 December 1921, the FA banned women from using official pitches, relegating them "onto muddy fields and into obscurity" until 1971. The FA reportedly explained their decision was made due to the women's clubs, with matches typically being played for charity, not donating enough money to charity.

Leah Williamson: During the war, First World War, the women started playing and they were really, really successful—
Olivia Colman: Didn't they have as many spectators as the men's game?
Williamson: Yeah, [...] Dick, Kerr Ladies. Incredible.
Colman: What happened?
Williamson: So, basically, when the men got back, would we call it jealousy, or, they were a little bit threatened, that maybe the women's [game] would be such a success, so the FA decided to ban it.

— Leah Williamson, who captained the England women's team to their first international title in 2022, discussing the impact with actress Olivia Colman on the 2022 New Year's Eve special of The Graham Norton Show

No women's club football match exceeded the attendance of the 1920 Boxing Day match until 99 years later on 17 March 2019, when Spanish league leaders Atlético Madrid played Barcelona at the Metropolitano Stadium in Madrid in front of 60,739 spectators. (Note: A non-regulation match between Barcelona and UE Centelles at the Camp Nou on 25 December 1970, when women's football was banned in Spain, had approximately 60,000 spectators.) The record has since been superseded twice more, both times becoming absolute attendance records for a women's football match (exceeding audiences for international fixtures), and both times by matches held in 2022 at the Camp Nou in Barcelona. (Note: 30 March 2022 Barcelona vs Real Madrid, with a crowd of 91,553; and 22 April 2022 Barcelona vs Wolfsburg, with 91,648.) The 1920 record was unbeaten in the United Kingdom for 103 years, eventually overcome when Arsenal hosted Wolfsburg at the Emirates Stadium in London on 1 May 2023 with a crowd of 60,063 spectators.

A 100th anniversary celebration of the match was set to take place at Deepdale, Preston's stadium, in 2020, but had to be cancelled due to the COVID-19 pandemic; a virtual celebration was organised instead.

== See also ==
- Selecció Barcelona 0–0 UE Centelles
