= National Sports Council (disambiguation) =

The National Sports Council is an organisation in Bangladesh.

National Sports Council may also refer to:

- Botswana National Sports Council
- National Sports Council (Nepal)
- National Sports Council of Zambia
- Consejo Superior de Deportes, in English National Sports Council. Spanish Sports Agency.
- National Sports Council (Brazil) (Conselho Nacional de Desportos), Brazilian sports governing body
