= Suzanne Wrack =

British journalist (born 1983)

- Education: University of Brighton Pearson College London
- Occupations: Journalist, writer

Suzanne Wrack is a British journalist and writer at The Guardian. She is the author of A Woman's Game: The Rise, Fall, and Rise Again of Women's Football and wrote You have the Power with England women's national football team captain, Leah Williamson. She features on The Guardian's Women's Football weekly podcast.

== Early life ==
Wrack grew up on a council estate in Hoxton, London. When she was 8 years old, she dreamt of being an architect, ultimately leading to her studying architecture at the University of Brighton.

== Career ==
During her career she has worked for multiple publications as an editor and digital designer including The Sunday Times, The New Day and the Morning Star. In 2017 she joined The Guardian as a Women's football writer. She has worked as a senior broadcast journalist for BBC Sport.

Wrack is an accredited football reporter, member of the Sports Journalists' Association, Football Writers' Association and Women in Football.

== Publications ==
- A Woman's Game: The Rise, Fall, and Rise Again of Women's Football (2022)
- Strong Women: Fifty Modern Icons of Sport (2023)

== Awards ==
In 2023, Wrack's book A Woman's Game won The Sunday Times Sports Book Vikki Orvice Award for New Women's Sports Writing.
