= Scottish Football Museum =

Museum in Glasgow City, Scotland

Coordinates: 55°49′32″N 4°15′4″W

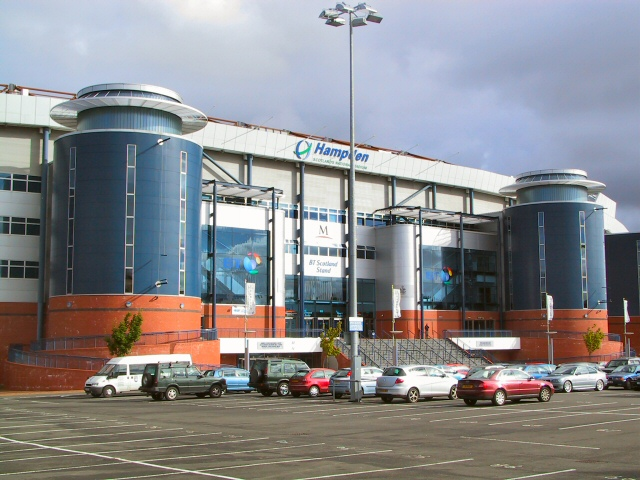
- Hampden Park, seat of the museum
- Established: 1994; 32 years ago
- Location: Hampden Park, Glasgow
- Collections: Association football memorabilia
- Website: scottishfootballmuseum.org.uk

The Scottish Football Museum is Scotland's national museum of association football, located in Hampden Park in Glasgow.

The museum was established in 1994 being first located in a small section of Glasgow's Museum of Transport. It was relocated to Hampden Park in 2001.

== Overview ==
The museum houses over 2,000 objects of football memorabilia, including the world's oldest cap and match ticket from the first official international match of 1872, and the world's oldest national trophy, the Scottish Cup, which was made in 1873. Although the FA Cup competition is older (established during the 1871–72 season), its original trophy has been lost.

Visitors can also see The Championship of the World Trophy: in 1888 Renton of Dunbartonshire, the Scottish Cup holders, beat West Bromwich Albion, the FA Cup winners, in a match dubbed as the 'Championship of the United Kingdom and the World'. In appalling weather Renton won 4–1.

== Stadium tour ==
The Scottish Football Museum offers an expansive and informative tour of Hampden Park where visitors get an experience similar to players on match day. Visitors are able to visit the underground roadway, team changing rooms and managers dugouts. Visitors are able to walk down the tunnel to the unveiling of the Hampden crowd.

Visitors get access to 2,500 exhibits in all of the 14 display galleries along with the chance to score a goal from the Hampden penalty spot. Visitors also get the chance to see the Scottish Hall of Fame and are able to climb the stairs to the cup presentation area in Hampden's stands.

== Collections ==
=== Kilmarnock Exhibition ===
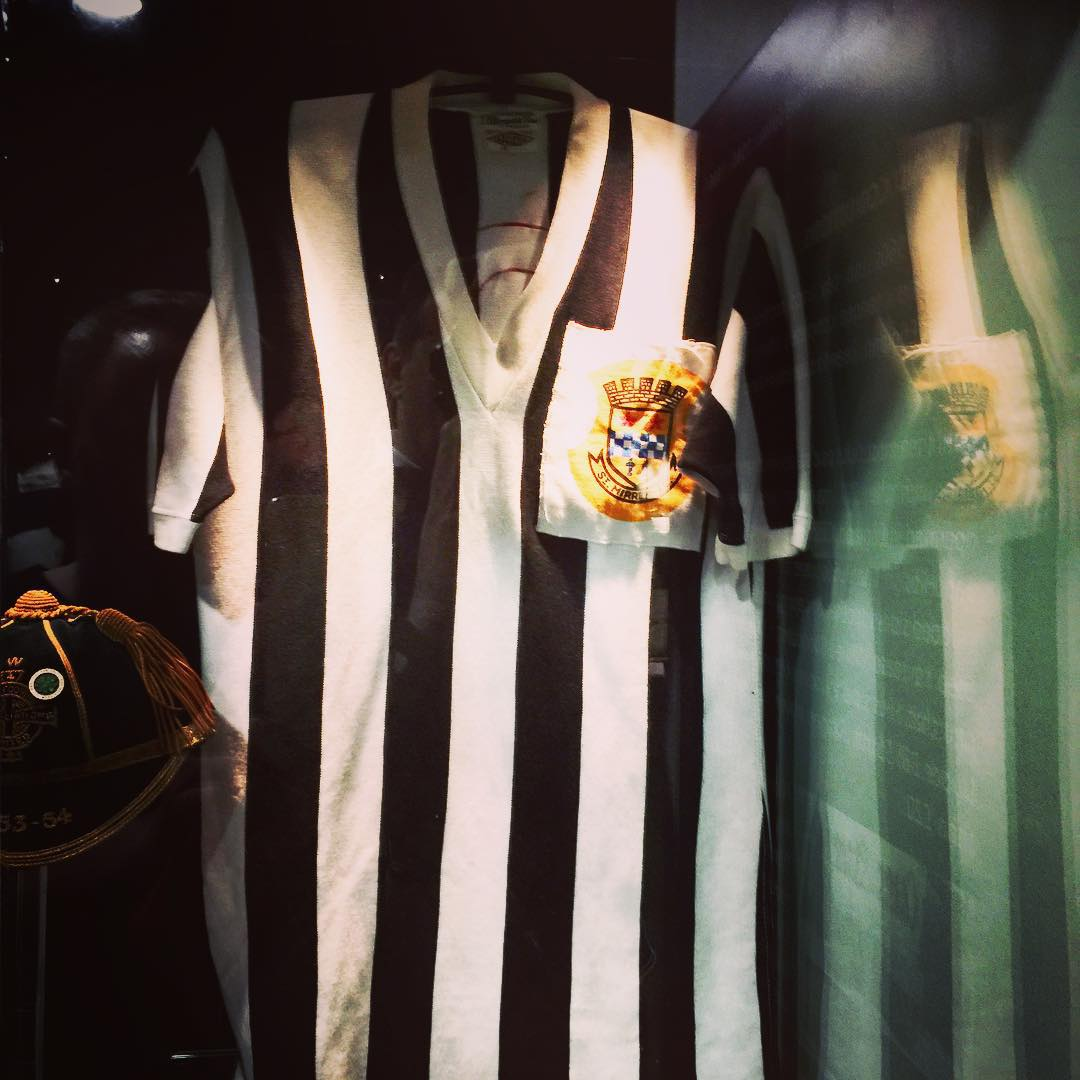
St. Mirren shirt

The museum has an extensive collection of Kilmarnock Football Club memorabilia, dating back to as early as 26 August 1899 with a picture of the opening of Rugby Park, Kilmarnock's home ground, containing Kilmarnock and Celtic players who took part in the first match ever played at the ground. Medals and trophies from that time are also on display as well as a Kilmarnock shirt from 1929, when it was worn by Mattha Smith, the grandfather of former SFA chief executive Gordon Smith. There is also another shirt which was worn in the 1960s by legendary Kilmarnock player, Frank Beattie.

=== World of Football ===
This exhibition celebrates the growth of the world of football from its origins with the 1872 Scotland v England football match up to the modern day, and Scotland's vital role in the start of football history.

=== The Frank Boyle Exhibition ===
From October 2009 until March 2011 the Scottish Football Museum played host to an exhibition of work by Edinburgh Evening News cartoonist Frank Boyle, whose accolades include Cartoonist of the Year at the Scottish Press Awards in 2003 and 2006. Many of his works were based on the fortunes of the two professional clubs based in Edinburgh, Hearts and Hibs, but also included other clubs across the country as well as the national team. These cartoons formed a basis for the exhibition presented at the museum.

=== Rutherglen Ladies ===
In 2021 the museum had an exhibition to celebrate 100 years since the leading Scottish team Rutherglen Ladies F.C. was formed.

== Hall of Fame ==
The Scottish Football Hall of Fame honours the players, managers and officials who have contributed to Scotland's football reputation. In 2019 there was over 110 football players in the Hall of Fame. Every year, supporters and figures from within football propose some worthy entrants before the final decision for the list of the players.
