= Willis Edwards (footballer) =

English footballer (1903–1988)

Personal information
- Date of birth: 28 April 1903
- Place of birth: Newton, Derbyshire, England
- Date of death: 27 September 1988 (aged 85)
- Place of death: Leeds, England
- Height: 5 ft 8 in (1.73 m)
- Position: Right half

Senior career*
Years	Team	Apps	(Gls)
1919–1925	Chesterfield	70	(1)
1925–1943	Leeds United	417	(6)

International career
1926–1929	England	16	(0)

Managerial career
- 1947–1948: Leeds United
- 1958: Leeds United (caretaker)
- * Club domestic league appearances and goals

Willis Edwards (28 April 1903 – 27 September 1988) was an English professional football player and manager.

== Early ==
Edwards was born in the mining village of Newton, North East Derbyshire, not far from Chesterfield and Alfreton. Like many boys in the area, he left school to go down the pit but he was soon spotted by Chesterfield as a teenager, playing for the village football team Newton Rangers.

== Career ==
=== Chesterfield ===
Having been close to joining Blackburn Rovers, Edwards instead signed for Chesterfield, where he made his debut in 1919 at the age of just 16. He went on to play 70 league games for the Spireites before joining Leeds United towards the end of the 1924–25 season.

=== Leeds United ===
Edwards played for the Elland Road club for 18 years, during which time he was never booked or sent off. He went on to make 444 appearances. Edwards continued turning out for Leeds during the war years and remained at the club after the war. On retiring as a player, he became assistant and he took over the managerial reins when Billy Hampson was dismissed in May 1947. His time as manager was relatively unsuccessful and he resumed his place in the backroom staff in April 1948, where he acted as a scout for the club. He only ended his association with Leeds in 1960, after serving the club for 35 years.

=== England ===
Edwards was capped by England on 16 occasions. His first cap was against Wales on 1 March 1926. He captained England in his last five internationals, with his final appearance on 20 November 1929.

== Later life and death ==
In his later working years, Edwards was employed at a jam factory.

He died in Leeds on 27 September 1988.
