= Basil Patchitt =

Singaporean-born English footballer

Personal information
- Full name: Basil Clement Alderson Patchitt
- Date of birth: 8 August 1900
- Place of birth: Singapore
- Date of death: 2 July 1991 (aged 90)
- Place of death: Johannesburg, South Africa
- Position: Right half

Senior career*
Years	Team	Apps	(Gls)
- Cambridge University
- Corinthian
- Castleford Town

International career
1923	England	2	(0)
- * Club domestic league appearances and goals

Basil Clement Alderson Patchitt (8 August 1900 – 2 July 1991) was an English international footballer who earned two caps for the England national team in 1923, captaining the team on both occasions. Patchitt, who played as a right half, played club football for Cambridge University, Corinthian and Castleford Town. He had earlier attended Charterhouse School.

== See also ==
- List of England international footballers born outside England
