= Hoover v. Meiklejohn =

Hoover v. Meiklejohn, 430 F. Supp. 164 (D. Colo. 1977) is a U.S. District Court decision on the issue of sex discrimination in interscholastic high school soccer competition.

The plaintiff Donna Hoover sued Alvin J. Meiklejohn and other members of the board of education, arguing Rule XXI Section 3 of the Colorado High School Activities Association, which limited participation in soccer to males, was unconstitutional as it denied female students equal educational opportunity. The court agreed and enjoined providing interscholastic soccer competition only for male students.

== Background ==
Donna Hoover participated in the junior varsity soccer team of Golden High School, Colorado, as the only female participant. This participation included conditioning and skills training, as well as competing in unofficial matches. The principal of Golden High School removed Hoover from the soccer team on or around the 28th of September, 1976 because Hoover's participation violated Rule XXI Section 3 of the Colorado High School Activities Association. The rule limited participation in soccer to "the male sex" because of "inordinate injury risk". Donna Hoover, by and through her parent Cynthia Hoover, filed a class action lawsuit against the members of the Board of Education of Jefferson County School District.

== Opinion ==
Because the parties do not really dispute soccer serves an educational purpose, Donna Hoover had a valid claim that she was denied equal educational opportunity.

Jude Matsch referenced Justice Brennan's majority decision in Craig v. Boren, 429 U.S. 190, 197 (1976) to identify that gender-based classifications must be "substantially related" to serving "important governmental objectives".

Judge Matsch noted that while males as a class would tend to have an advantage over females as a class in contact sports, the variation of individuals within a given sex is greater than the average difference between the sexes. If the governmental objective is to enhance the educational experience, excluding girls would not substantially serve that objective. And if the purpose is to protect the health of students, only considering differences between males and females as classes without considering the variation within the classes is arbitrary and therefore also not substantially related to that objective.

Judge Matsch concluded that making interscholastic soccer available only to male students is unconstitutional.
