= Florrie Redford =

English footballer and nurse

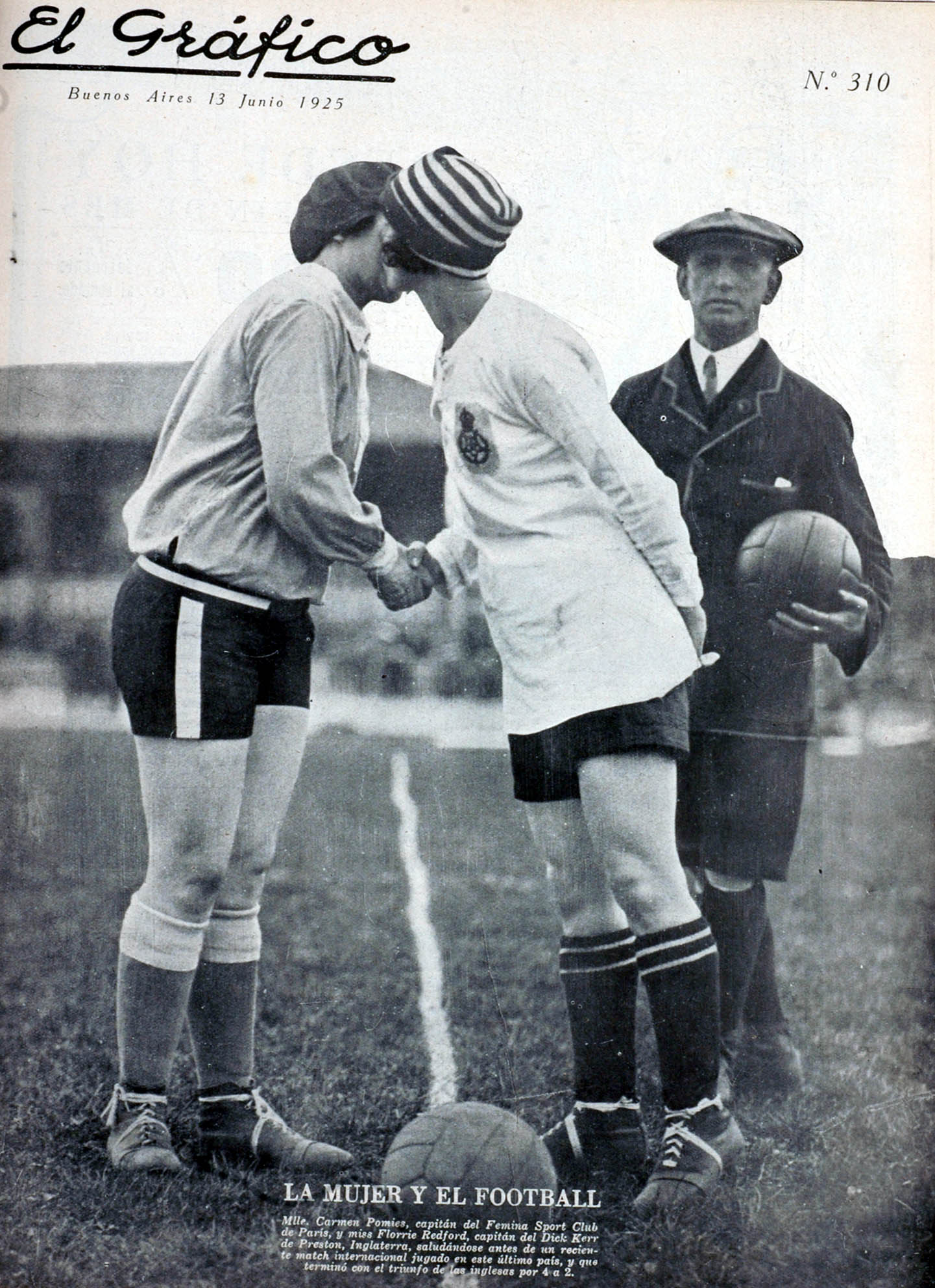
Florrie Redford (middle) with French footballer Carmen Pomiès, 1925

Florrie Redford was an English footballer and nurse. She played for Dick, Kerr Ladies, one of England's earliest professional women's association football teams. She was a leading goal scorer for the club in 1921, when she scored a total of 170 goals. In later life she worked as a nurse in Canada, returning to the team briefly in 1938.

== Early life ==
Redford was born in Preston, Lancashire and, during the First World War, worked for Dick, Kerr & Co. producing munitions and other war supplies. During this time she and the other young women who made up the majority of the factory staff, men being largely drafted into the Army, played football during their meal breaks.

== Club career ==
Most of the team members had full-time jobs and Redford was training to be a psychiatric nurse. However, she became a key member of the team as it transitioned from informal games with other groups of factory workers to formation as Dick, Kerr Ladies Football Club. Redford played in their inaugural match as a club on Christmas Day 1917 and went on to play in international matches against Scotland and Ireland in 1918. She played as centre-forward and was a leading goal scorer, described as having 'vision and pace' in her play.

In spring 1920, with the war now over, the team would go on to play additional international matches including against a French team featuring Alice Milliat and Carmen Pomiès. Dick, Kerr Ladies won the first two, with Redford scoring in both, while the third was a 1-1 draw. The fourth match, also against France and the only loss of the tour, was played in London at the famous Stamford Bridge stadium and was recorded by the French company Pathé News. The match helped to turn Redford and the other players into nationally and even internationally known figures. In a round-up of the season, the Dundee Evening News featured Redford in an article entitled Scoring Feat by Lady Footballer that drew attention to the large number of goals she had scored that season. Redford and Dick, Kerr teammate Lizzy Ashcroft fostered a friendship with Pomiès, who in 2021 returned to Preston and joined the team for a year.

By 1921, the team was often attracting larger crowds than male teams playing on the same day and, that year, the Football Association withdrew recognition and banned female teams from playing on FA grounds. The ban would remain in place until 1971. The team resolved to continue playing, however, and in 1922 Redford joined them on their tour to Canada and the United States. Teammate Alice Kell said in an interview on the team's return to England that: "We played our usual game and Lily Parr was always an outstanding player and our leading goalscorer was Florrie Redford".

After playing for Dick, Kerr's against Fémina Sport in 1920, Redford was invited to join the French club and spent a period living with Pomiés and playing football in France. In 1923, Redford was playing for Fémina but joined Stoke Ladies for a match they contested against a different French team, Les Sportives, at Camp de la Indústria, the recently vacated home ground of FC Barcelona. Les Sportives objected to Redford playing for Stoke, and the match in which she played (of two in one weekend) was not counted in which team would win the charity cup prize: Redford scored a hat-trick, and Stoke won their other match anyway.

By 1925, Redford had returned to England. Fémina Sport returned to France for another 10-match Gallery of Champions tour in May 1925, facing Redford during one of the matches as opposing captains. A photograph of Pomiès and Redford kissing before a match at the Herne Hill Velodrome, and filmed footage of the match, were widely circulated.

== Later life ==
Redford emigrated to Canada where she worked as a nurse and made a brief return to the team in 1938. She was friends with teammate and colleague Alice Kell whom she had known since they were at school together.

== Sources ==
- Newsham, Gail (2018). In a league of their own!: The Dick, Kerr ladies, 1917-1965 (Special Centenary ed.). Paragon Publishing. ISBN 978-1782225638.
- Tate, Tim (2013). Girls with Balls - The Secret History of Women's Football. John Blake Publishing. ISBN 9781782196860.
