= Molly Seaton =

Northern Irish footballer

Mary Ann Seaton (2 September 1905 – 12 January 1974) was a Northern Irish footballer.

== Early life ==
Seaton was born in Belfast, Northern Ireland in 1905 and at the age of nine her father died.

== Career ==
Seaton was nicknamed "Big Molly". She played for clubs including men's teams. She also captained the Ireland women's team. She had an agent, Josie Farrell, who also worked as a boxing agent. She is regarded as Ireland's greatest women's footballer of all time.

== Death ==
Seaton died on 12 January 1974 aged sixty-eight.
