= Decree-law 3,199 =

1941 decree-law in Brazil

Decree Law 3,199 is a decree-law enacted on 14 April 1941 by Getúlio Vargas establishing the bases of the organization of sport throughout Brazil. The law created the National Sports Council to centralize and regulate sports administration across Brazil, promote amateur athletics, oversee professional sports and manage brazils participation in international competitions. This was all to promote Vargas nationalist state-building efforts during the Estado Novo. The decree aimed to reorganize Brazils previously divided sports system and strengthen national unity. This decree also mainly limited the sports arrangements of women, hindering for example the practice of women's football in Brazil. This decree-law was in force until 1979.

== Impact on Women & Public Response ==
Promulgated by Brazil's National Sports Council (Conselho Nacional de Desportos, or "CND"), Decree Law 3199 effectively prohibited Brazilian women from participating in most organized sports, including but not limited to track, baseball, rugby, polo, boxing, and—perhaps most significantly—soccer. Soccer ("football," outside of the United States) has historically played a central role in Latin American culture, and the exclusion of women from organized sports essentially excluded them from an important facet of the Brazilian identity. In 1965, the CND issued Deliberation n. 7, explicitly banning women from playing football, futsal, beach soccer, water polo, polo, rugby, weightlifting, and baseball. Non-contact sports like volleyball and basketball were usually exempted from the ban.

Governing bodies supported the Decree based on misogynistic ideas of conventional femininity. Brazilian President Getúlio Vargas painted a picture of these sports as "too violent" and "not suitable to the female body." Government officials later cited alleged health concerns surrounding women's involvement in sports, noting that it had the potential to stunt their sexual development. In 1944, physical education journal Revista Brasileira de Educação went so far as to warn that too many muscles would ruin female players' attractiveness. The CND's then-president General Newton Cavalcanti asserted that women's participation in sports was "incompatible with their nature." Despite the ban many women continued to play unofficially, however their achievements could not be recorded which has created a gap in the history of women's sports in Brazil.

Though the Decree formally prohibited women from participating in sports, ultimately women still continued to play privately and informally in recreational or community settings, noting that it "didn’t kill participation in the sport, it just drove it away from watchful eye." Evidence from the 1970s indicates that women's teams existed in several Brazilian cites and played regular matches, sometimes training and competing for years without official recognition. The restrictions reflected broader gender norms in Brazilian society that framed football as a masculine activity and portrayed women's participation as inappropriate or harmful to their health or reproductive roles. media overage during this period frequently emphasized women's appearance or femininity rather than their athletic ability, reinforcing the stereotype that discourages women's participation n the sport. It was eventually repealed in 1979, as the country moved away from authoritarian rule, came out of a 15 year military dictatorship, feminist movements and activist increased demand for women's rights, including the ability to participate in sports. The continual pressure from public events advocating for women's participation in sports led to the sports authorities to officially allow women's football again in the early 1980s.

== After the repeal of Decree-law 3199 ==
The prohibition on women’s football was removed in December 1979, the sport did not immediately become fully legal or organized. The resolution that removed the ban required women’s sports to follow international regulations, but international governing bodies had not yet formally established structures for women’s football. As a result, the sport entered a transitional period in Brazil in which it was no longer banned but still lacked official regulation. National football authorities showed little interest in promoting women’s games, leaving players and teams without formal competitions or institutional support. This situation lasted until 1983, when Brazil’s National Sports Council approved regulations allowing women’s football to be officially organized. The new rules included several differences from normal games and mens games, such as shorter matches, lighter balls, and smaller pitches. With these regulations in place, women’s football finally gained formal recognition in Brazil, allowing teams and competitions to be established legally after more than forty years of restriction.

== See also ==
- Brazil women's national football team
