= Alice Kell =

English association football player

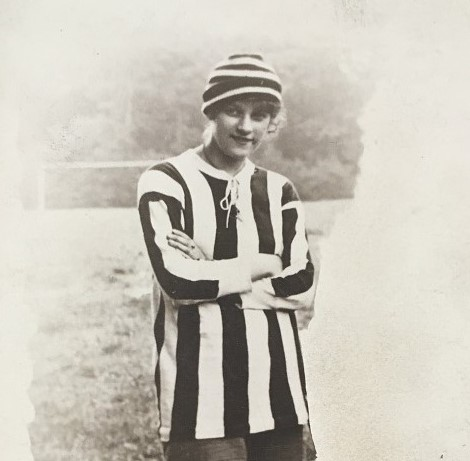

Personal information
- Full name: Alice Cook
- Date of birth: 24 June 1898
- Place of birth: Preston, Lancashire, England
- Date of death: 2 December 1972 (aged 74)
- Place of death: Preston, Lancashire, England
- Position: Defender

Senior career*
Years	Team	Apps	(Gls)
1917–1928	Dick, Kerr Ladies		
- * Club domestic league appearances and goals as of 17:48, 24 June 2019 (UTC) ‡ National team caps and goals as of 17:48, 24 June 2019 (UTC)

Alice Cook (née Kell; 24 June 1898 – 2 December 1972) was an association football player and the first captain of Dick, Kerr Ladies F.C., one of the first prominent female football teams in the world. She played in their inaugural match at Preston North End's Deepdale on Christmas Day 1917.

== Early life ==
Kell was born in Preston, Lancashire on 24 June 1898 and, during the First World War, worked for Dick, Kerr & Co producing munitions and other war supplies. During this time she and the other young women who made up the majority of the factory staff (men being largely drafted into the army) used to play football during their meal-breaks.

== Club career ==
Kell was recognised as being a good defender and was often mentioned in the press with glowing reports. She played in the first international against the French Ladies at Deepdale and captained the team when they played in a match by searchlight in December 1920. Later that month, she scored a hat-trick in the 4–0 victory against St Helens at Goodison Park when 53,000 spectators watched the match. She travelled to America with the team in 1922. She played as goalkeeper for the team and latterly became the trainer for a while before leaving the team to get married.

== Personal life ==
Alice Kell was christened at Christ Church on Bow Lane in Preston. She lived on Marsh Lane with her parents, four brothers and two sisters. Her eldest brother Tom was killed in action in 1915 during World War I after enlisting with the Loyal North Lancashire Regiment. She was best friends at school with Florrie Redford and the two girls were inseparable. She married Albert Cook and had one son Reg who was born in 1930. She was always a keen supporter of Preston North End and was a great admirer of Sir Tom Finney. Later in her life, she developed arthritis and died on 2 December 1972 after falling and breaking her hip.
