= Lily Parr =

English footballer

Personal information
- Full name: Lilian Parr
- Date of birth: 26 April 1905
- Place of birth: St Helens, Lancashire, England
- Date of death: 22 May 1978 (aged 73)
- Place of death: Goosnargh, Preston, England
- Height: 5 ft 11 1/4 in (1.81 m)
- Position: Outside left

Senior career*
Years	Team	Apps	(Gls)
1919	St. Helens Ladies		
1920–1951	Dick, Kerr Ladies		
- * Club domestic league appearances and goals

Lilian Parr (26 April 1905 – 24 May 1978) was an English professional women's association football player who played as a winger. She is best known for playing for the Dick, Kerr's Ladies team, which was founded in 1917 and based in Preston, Lancashire.

In 2002, she was the only woman to be made an inaugural inductee into the English Football Hall of Fame at the National Football Museum.

== Biography ==
=== Early life ===
Parr was born in a rented house in Union Street, Gerrard's Bridge, St. Helens; the fourth of seven children born to George and Sarah Parr. Her father was a labourer at the local glass factory and the family rented out space in the yard and rooms at their house for extra income.

As a girl, Parr displayed little enthusiasm for traditional pursuits such as sewing and cookery. Instead, her fearless streak and robust frame allowed her to compete alongside boys in both football and rugby. Under the tutelage of her elder brothers, she became proficient in both sports.

She played for local team St. Helens Ladies, where it is rumoured she appeared more than 100 times for the club.

=== Dick, Kerr's Ladies ===
During the First World War in England there was a growing interest in women's football and Dick, Kerr & Co. was the name of the Preston munitions factory where most of the women on the team worked. The Dick, Kerr's Ladies team regularly drew large crowds including a famous event on 26 December 1920 at Goodison Park that drew more than 53,000 spectators.

During her time working for Dick, Kerr & Co she lodged in Preston with one of her teammates, Alice Norris. While playing for the Dick, Kerr's Ladies she was noted for her large appetite and almost constant smoking of Woodbine cigarettes.

Unlike women's teams today, Parr played against both male and female teams and she reputedly had a harder shot than any male player. She had started life playing football with her brothers on waste ground in St Helens, before playing for the St Helens' Ladies team. There she was spotted and recruited into the Dick, Kerr's Ladies and a job in the Dick, Kerr & Co. factory in Preston, with 10 shillings in expenses per game.

When Parr first came to the team she was fourteen years old and she played at left-back. She was moved to the left-wing on New Years Day 1921 and scored a hat-trick against a "Rest of Lancashire" team. In her first year with the club she scored 108 goals, second only to Florrie Redford who scored 170. During her career with the Dick, Kerr Ladies she scored 986 goals. According to a BBC article she scored 43 goals for the team in her first season, when she was 14 years old. She totalled 967 goals in her career between 1919 and 1951.

=== Later life ===
The number of women's teams had continued to grow during this time until 1921 when the Football Association banned women from playing on their member grounds. Support for women's teams declined, but many women such as Parr continued to play on village greens and another non-associated land. The Dick, Kerr Ladies toured North America in 1922 following the English ban. Banned again on their arrival in Canada, they toured the US and played nine games. They won three, drew three, and lost three against the top division men's teams. Parr continued with the Dick, Kerr's Ladies even when they lost the support of their factory and were renamed the Preston Ladies.

After working in the Dick, Kerr & Co. factory Parr trained as a nurse. She worked in Whittingham Mental Hospital until she retired. While working at the hospital, she continued to play women's football for the Preston Ladies until 1951. This included taking part in a further tour of France.

Parr lived out most of the rest of her life in Goosnargh, near Preston. She lived with her partner Mary, and since her death has become an LGBT rights icon. She lived to see The FA lift the ban on women from playing on their member grounds in 1971. She died of breast cancer in 1978, aged 73, and is buried in the town of her birth, St Helens, Merseyside. Her heir was a nephew, Roy Parr.

== Style of play ==
Get me to the hospital as quick as you can, she's gone and broken me flamin' arm!

— Attributed to an unnamed professional Football League goalkeeper who blocked one of Parr's shots

At almost 5 foot 10 inches tall, Parr's strength was said to be one of her greatest assets. She was particularly noted for the power of her kicking, both in delivering from the left flank and shooting at goal. Teammate Joan Whalley said in an interview with Gail Newsham: "She had a kick like a mule. She was the only person I knew who could lift a dead ball, the old heavy leather ball, from the left-wing over to me on the right and nearly knock me out with the force of the shot..."

The programme from a September 1923 fixture between Dick, Kerr's Ladies, and Stoke described Parr as "Big, fast and powerful, is tricky and can take corner kicks better than most men." It also noted that Parr "scores goals from extraordinary angles with a left-foot cross drive, which nearly breaks the net."

Aggression was another feature of Parr's play. During Dick, Kerr's Ladies' 1922 tour to the USA, the Washington Post reported that "Miss Lily Parr, at outside left, put up an aggressive game registering two goals in seven tries she had at the net" following a 4–4 draw with Washington's top male club. In April 1921 Parr and Hilda Durbar of Stoke United were sent off for fighting in Dick, Kerr Ladies' fractious 2–0 win before 13,000 fans at The Old Recreation Ground. Parr was also praised for her overall technique and vision. Contemporary Scotland international footballer Bobby Walker described her as the "best natural timer of a football I have ever seen."

== Legacy ==
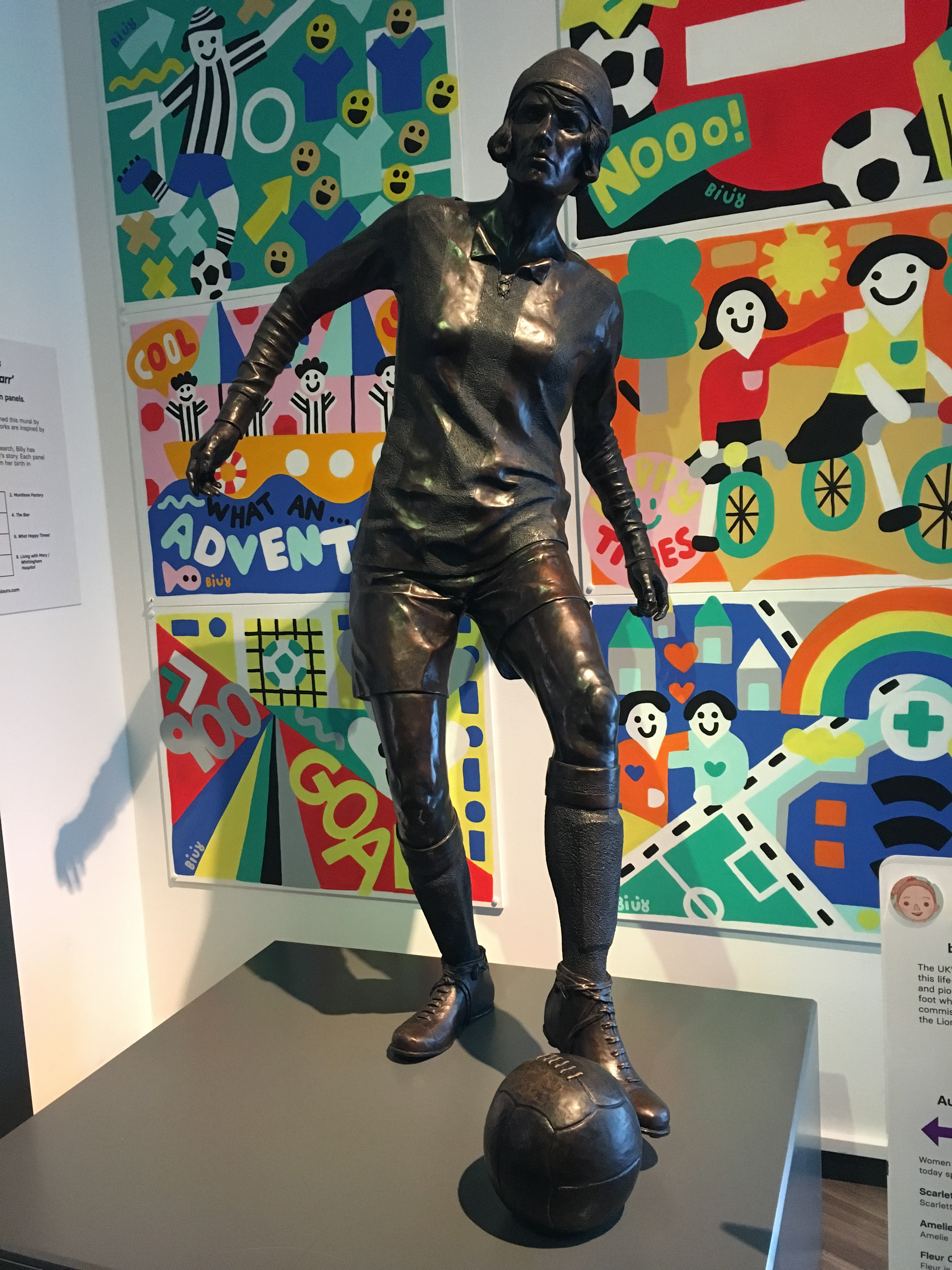
Lily Parr statue on display in her exhibit at the National Football Museum

=== Lily Parr Exhibition Trophy ===
On 11 February 2007, Lou Hart from Camden LGBT Forum approached the London Lesbian Kickabouts team with a view to setting up a lesbian football event for Camden LGBT History month. The Lily Parr Exhibition Trophy was born and the Kickabouts played the Paris team Arc en Ciel (Rainbow), re-enacting the first match between the Dick, Kerr Ladies and the Paris ladies' team. The London Lesbian Kickabouts won 7–3.

=== Statue ===
In May 2019 it was announced that a statue of Parr, by sculptor Hannah Stewart, would be unveiled at the National Football Museum in Manchester in June. This was done in June; making Parr the first female footballer commemorated with a statue.

=== Permanent Display at the National Football Museum, Manchester ===
In July 2021 a new permanent display celebrating Parr's life and impact on the game was opened at The National Football Museum.

In July 2023, Parr was featured in the New York Times Overlooked series obituaries on remarkable people whose deaths initially went unreported in the newspaper.

== See also ==
- List of women footballers with 300 or more goals
- List of footballers who achieved hat-trick records
