= Dick, Kerr Ladies F.C. =

Former women's football club in Preston

Dick, Kerr Ladies
- Dick, Kerr Ladies team in 1921
- Full name: Dick, Kerr Ladies Football Club
- Founded: 1917
- Dissolved: 1965; 61 years ago
- Ground: Preston, Lancashire, England
- Website: https://www.dickkerrladies.com/
Home colours	Away colours

Dick, Kerr Ladies Football Club was one of the earliest known women's association football teams in England. The team remained in existence for over 48 years, from 1917 to 1965, playing 755 games, winning 682, drawing 39, and losing 34.

During its early years, matches played for charity attracted anywhere from 4,000 to over 50,000 spectators per game. In 1920, Dick, Kerr Ladies defeated a French side 2–0 in front of 25,000 people, a match that went down in history as the first international women's association football game. The team faced strong opposition by The Football Association (FA), who banned the women from using fields and stadiums controlled by FA-affiliated clubs for 50 years (the rule was repealed in 1971).

== History ==
=== Origins ===
Dick, Kerr Ladies F.C. was founded in Preston, Lancashire, England as a World War I-era works team for the company Dick, Kerr & Co. They played in charity fixtures against similar teams around the country and raised money for injured servicemen during and after the war.

The women on the team had joined the company in 1914 to produce ammunition for the war. Although women had initially been discouraged from playing football, it was believed that such organised sporting activity would be good for morale in wartime factories and would aid production, so competitive sport was encouraged.

During a period of low production at the factory in October 1917, women workers joined the apprentices in the factory yard for informal football matches during their tea and lunch breaks. After beating the men of the factory in an informal game, the women of Dick, Kerr formed a team, under the management of office worker, Alfred Frankland.

The Daily Post wrote, "Dick, Kerr were not long in showing that they suffered less than their opponents from stage fright, and they had a better all-round understanding of the game. Their forward work, indeed, was often surprisingly good, one or two of the ladies showing quite admirable ball control." Players were paid 10 shillings a game by Dick, Kerr & Co. to cover their expenses.

The matches drew strong crowds from the beginning; Dick, Kerr beat Arundel Coulthard Factory 4–0 in front of a crowd of 10,000 on Christmas Day 1917 at Deepdale.

=== International charity matches begin (1920) ===
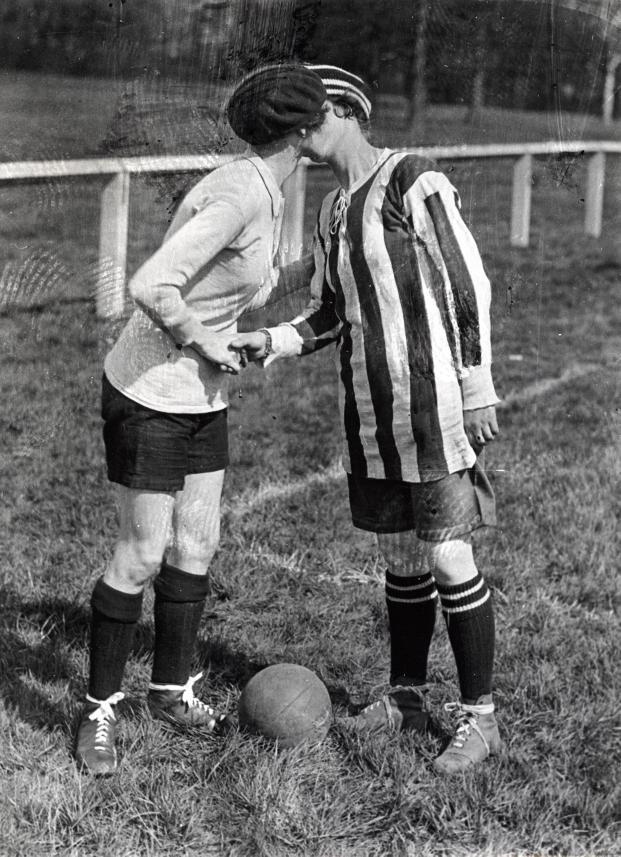
Team captains Alice Kell for Dick, Kerr Ladies, right, and Madeleine Bracquemond for France kiss before a match in 1920.

The team played a match in 1920 against a French side. Some say it was an international match, but as Dick, Kerr were a works team rather than a representative or regional side, others believe it was not strictly speaking an inter nation match. The French team was composed of players from several Parisian football clubs and led by the great patron of women's sport in France, Alice Milliat.

Dick, Kerr played a total of four games in the UK the same year. The first match was played at Deepdale, where the squad won 2–0. The second match at Stockport was won by the Dick, Kerr Ladies 5–2, followed by the third game in Manchester which drew 1–1. The final was won by the French at Stamford Bridge in London with a score of 2–1.

The Dick, Kerr Ladies went on to tour in France where they played in Paris, Roubaix, Le Havre and finally Rouen, drawing the first three and winning the final game.

The French tour generated tremendous publicity. Boxing Day of 1920 their match against St Helens Ladies at Goodison Park, Liverpool put on to raise money for the Unemployed Ex Servicemens Distress Fund drew a crowd of 53,000 spectators, a world record for women's club matches that lasted for over 98 years. The team were featured regularly in the Pathé newsreels of the day and players like Lily Parr and Alice Woods became an appealing draw at British football grounds.

Dick, Kerr Ladies F.C. played against Huddersfield Atalanta Ladies F.C. at Hillsborough, Sheffield, on 6 May 1921; a programme for the match survives.

=== FA ban (1921) ===
The Football Association banned women's football at its members grounds on 5 December 1921. The FA claimed that football was unsuitable for females and that charitable donations were being misappropriated.

The resolution passed by the FA's Consultative Committee read:

5. Women's Football Matches. The following Resolution was adopted:

Complaints having been made as to football being played by women, Council felt impelled to express the strong opinion that the game of football is quite unsuitable for females and should not be encouraged.
Complaints have also been made as to the conditions under which some of the matches have been arranged and played, and the appropriation of receipts to other than charitable objects. The Council are further of the opinion that an excessive proportion of the receipts are absorbed in expenses and an inadequate percentage devoted to charitable objects.

For these reasons the Council requests the Clubs belonging to the Association refuse the use of their grounds for such matches.

— FA Consultative Committee,

The FA ban stayed in place for fifty years – finally being rescinded in 1971 – and ultimately became a major setback for the women's game in England. The grounds that were under the FA's governance were the only ones that held enough capacity to meet the demand of the women's games in the early 1920s. Because of the ban, women's games were relegated to smaller capacity fields with less resources and exposure. The FA finally recognised women's football in July 1971, 50 years after they had banned the game and six years after the team folded. The later Preston North End W.F.C., now Fylde Ladies, is unrelated to this team.

The women's game in England was left on its own until 1993 when the FA took over its administration and funding.

=== American tour (1922) ===
The team will continue to play, if the organisers of charity matches will provide grounds, even if we have to play on ploughed fields.

— Alfred "Pop" Frankland, Dick, Kerr's Ladies manager, Belles of the Ball (1991), p. 75.

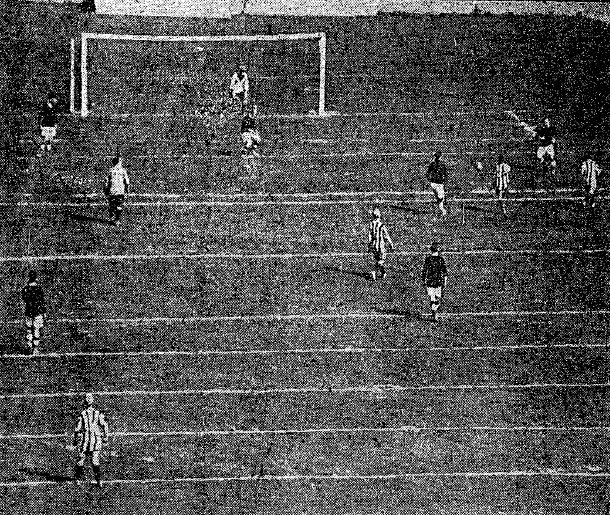
Dick, Kerr Ladies playing at American League Park, 1922

Despite the FA ban, the team continued to play on non-FA grounds. In late 1922, the team travelled abroad for a tour of Canada and the United States. Upon their arrival, Canada's Dominion Football Association prevented the team from playing anywhere in the country. The Washington Post reported on 23 September 1922, "The Dick, Kerr's team of English women soccer football players arrived today on the steamship Montclare en route to the United States where they will play a series of games. The girls will not be allowed to play Canadian soccer teams under order from the Dominion Football Association which objects to women football players. The team's first game will be at Patterson, N.J., on September 24th." The team played nine U.S.-based men's teams before crowds ranging from four to ten thousand spectators. Some of the opposing teams included immigrants who had previously played in the British football league, plus at least one American who would go on to represent the U.S. at the 1930 World Cup finals. Dick, Kerr Ladies acquitted themselves well, winning three games, drawing three, and losing three. They proved tough opponents. "I played against them in 1922," recalled Paterson goalkeeper Peter Renzulli. "We were national champions and we had a hell of a job beating them."

The Fall River Evening Herald in Fall River, Massachusetts, described the match there as "one of the biggest things in soccer ever to have visited the United States." Newspapers often described the team as "showing great stamina, clever combination of play, and considerable speed."

=== "World Champions" ===
In September 1923 they played a match against the leading Scottish side Rutherglen Ladies (led by James H. Kelly and based in Rutherglen near Glasgow) at Shawfield Park; Dick, Kerr Ladies had the unusual experience of a defeat, the Scottish team winning 2–0. Kelly declared his team "World Champions" following the match. It is speculated that the defeat prevented any rematch as Kerr's team were expected to win their matches. The title of "World Champions" was still used in Dick Kerr's advertising and in 1925 Kerr's team was claiming to be World Champions from 1917 to 1925.

== Colours ==
The team's club colours were black and white striped jerseys with a small Union Jack on the left breast and blue shorts. Their England colours were white jerseys and blue shorts. The women also wore striped hats to cover their hair.

== Preston Ladies F.C. (1926–1965) ==
In 1926, Alfred Frankland had a falling-out with the Dick, Kerr Ladies ownership. The team's name changed to "Preston Ladies F.C." and carried on playing until 1965. Despite having to play in more obscure locations due to the FA ban, the team saw an average of 5,000 spectators at their matches throughout the 1930s. In 1937, the team played against Scottish women champions, the Edinburgh Ladies, and won 5–1, earning the "unofficial" title of world champions for the first time.

The side defeated a team from Paris 4–0 in 1954 with Bill Shankly as referee. The winners were presented with a cup afterwards.

== In popular culture ==
=== Television ===
==== Nation on Film – Women's Football ====
The story of the Dick, Kerr Ladies F.C was featured in the BBC's Nation on Film – Women's Football in 2005, which featured archive film footage of the team in action shot by professionals and amateurs.

==== When Football Banned Women ====
Dick, Kerr Ladies' history was revisited in When Football Banned Women, a documentary presented by Clare Balding and broadcast on Channel 4 in 2017: the programme featured archive footage and still photographs as well as historians discussing the club and analysing the reaction of the football authorities to the women's game.

=== Theatrical adaptations ===
==== Our Girls Our Game ====
Our Girls Our Game is a musical based on the story of Dick, Kerr Ladies F.C., written by Victoria Saxton and directed by Charlotte Westenra for British Youth Musical Theatre in 2021.

==== Famous and Forgotten ====
Famous and Forgotten is a play based on the story of Dick, Kerr Ladies F.C., written by playwright Andrew Colley. In 2004 the play won the 'Naked Talent' playwriting competition at the Mercury Theatre, Colchester, and it has been widely performed by amateur and professional groups in the UK and abroad. It was performed at the college at Braintree in 2011.

==== Unfit for Females ====
The story of the Dick, Kerr Ladies, set against the backdrop of the impact of the Suffragette movement and The Great War, has provided the inspiration for a play called Unfit for Females, produced by London theatre company Bold Over Theatre. The show ran from 24 March to 13 April 2014 at Riverside Studios, Hammersmith, before embarking on a national tour.

==== No Man's Land ====
No Man's Land by Stephanie Alice McKervill was produced by Ribcaged Productions in 2014. It tells the story of the Dick, Kerr Ladies' rise and their treatment both during and after the Great War. It toured Lancashire, including the Grand Clitheroe, Blackburn Empire and Lowther Pavilion, Lytham, in 2014.

==== Not a Game for Girls ====
Not a Game for Girls, a play written by Benjamin Peel, was first performed by Matthew Wignall's Off the Rock Productions company at Friargate Theatre, York, in June 2017, directed by Alison Young. Using a mixture of real, composite and fictional characters, it begins with the team's formation in 1917 and ends with the 1921 ban. The production illustrates the social changes during and after the Great War, as well as the effect of the conflict on men.

=== Modern dance ===
==== Quite Unfit For Females ====
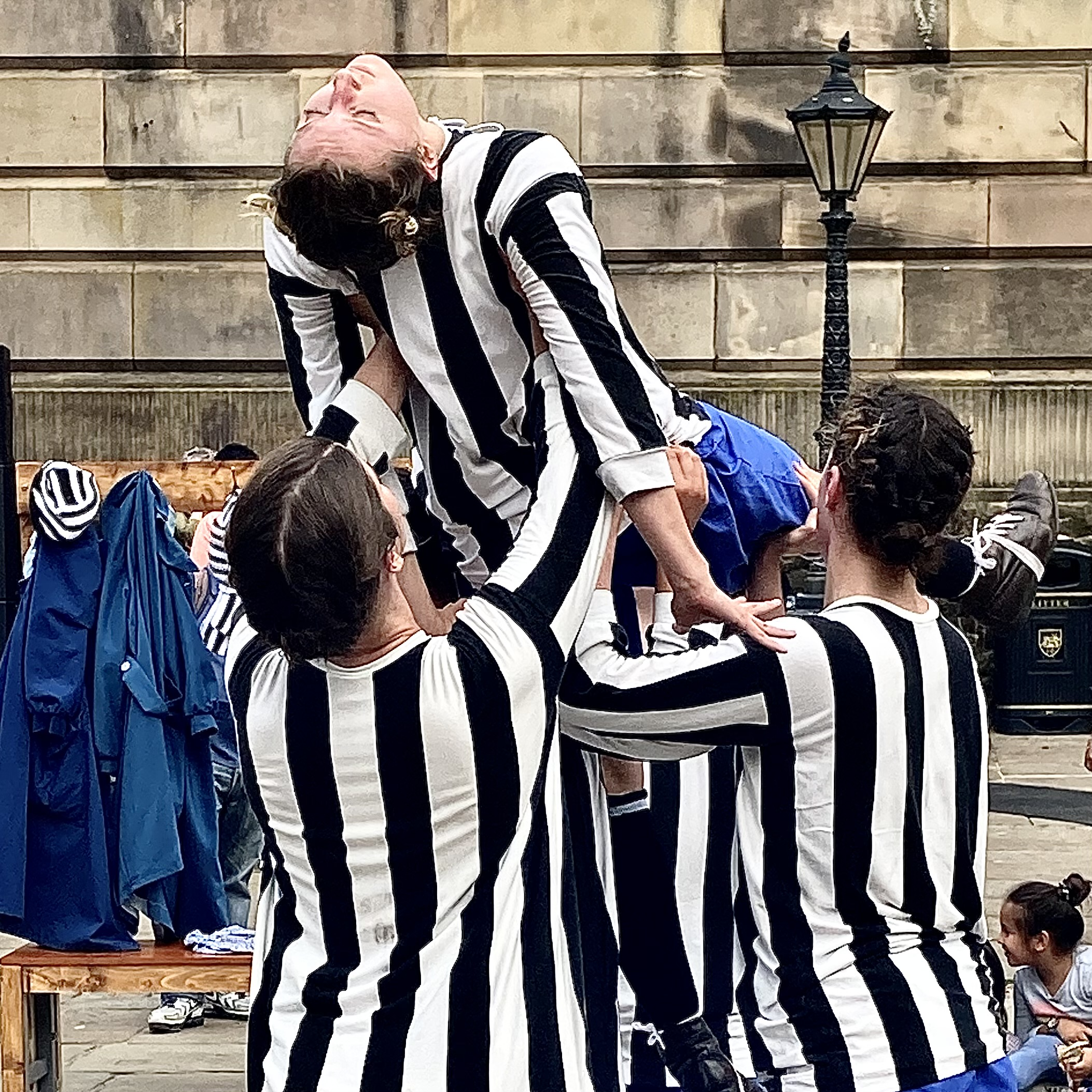
About Time Dance Company's performance of 'Quite Unfit For Females'

'Quite Unfit For Females' was performed by About Time Dance Company as part of the 2021 Lancashire Encounter Festival. The piece was performed in their home city of Preston at the site of its flag market. The piece used dance to tell their story from inception, through FA ban and beyond.

== See also ==
- Florrie Redford, player
- Nellie Halstead, player
- Joan Whalley, player
- British Ladies' Football Club
