= Season (sports) =

Season of a sports league or competition, generally a specific one year period

In an organized sports league, a typical season is the portion of one year in which regulated games of the sport are in session: for example, in Major League Baseball the season lasts approximately from the last week of March to the last week of September. In other team sports, like association football or basketball, it is generally from August or September to May although in some countries – such as Northern Europe, North America or East Asia – the season for outdoor summer sports starts in the spring and finishes in autumn, mainly due to weather conditions encountered during the winter.

A year can often be broken up into several distinct sections (sometimes themselves called seasons). These are: a preseason, usually a series of exhibition games played for training purposes; a regular season, the main period of the league's competition; the postseason, a playoff tournament played against the league's top teams to determine the league's champion; and the offseason, the time when there is no official competition.

== Preseason ==
In association football, many clubs tour and then play a series of exhibition games for training purposes. Specifically in Brazil, teams play in state championships before the start of the Brazilian League.

In baseball, many professional clubs go to spring camp and followed by an exhibition spring training season.

In gridiron football, the National Football League's preseason and the Canadian Football League's preseaon are highly structured three– or two–game series of games, respectively, in which teams are afforded a larger roster limit and play games that do not count toward their records; they are used to evaluate and prepare talent for the upcoming regular season. In college football, particularly that played at the FBS level, a true preseason is not played but many teams play a "spring game" which is an internal team practice structured like a game.

In the highest levels of professional tennis, the preseason (November–December) consists of extensive period of training on and off the court (gym and fitness work as well as working on tennis-specific skills like for example improving the accuracy of serve).

== Regular season ==
In sport, the term "regular season" or "home-and-away season" refers to the sport's league competition. The regular season is usually similar to a group tournament format: teams are divided into groups, conferences or divisions, and each club plays a set number of games against a set number of opponents. In most countries the league is played in a double round-robin format, where every team plays every other team twice, once at their home venue, and once away at the opposition's venue as visitors. The results over all games are accumulated and when every team has completed its full schedule of games, a winner is declared.

In North America, the scheduling is different. Rather than every team playing all others twice, teams usually play more games against local rivals than teams in other parts of the country. For example, the NBA's Los Angeles Lakers will play the Los Angeles Clippers (a team within their division, a subdivision of the conference) four times in a regular season, while both will only play the Toronto Raptors, who are in the opposite Eastern Conference, twice. Part of this is due to the vast geographic distances between some teams in North America—measured in a straight line, Los Angeles is 3,494 kilometres from Toronto, for instance—and a desire to limit travel expenses. In the scheduling system used in the NFL, it is possible for two teams to only meet every four years, and to only have 2 common opponents in a season. Major League Baseball has the most uneven schedules of all the four major North American sports. In MLB, the conferences are called leagues instead, but have exactly the same effect as conferences (as with all North American major leagues, leagues, conferences, and division are not based on skill, but instead geography, history, and rivalries). Prior to scheduling changes in 2023, teams played 19 games against each of the teams in their own division each year but only played 20 games total against all of the teams in the other league. Because each of the inter-league match-ups was part of a three-game series or a two-game series, teams played no games at all against most teams from the other league. They played 6 of the 15 teams in the other league, a historically high number (until 1997, interleague play was limited to exhibition matches and the postseason World Series, and thus MLB teams did not play the other league's teams at all). In 2023, teams played all interleague teams in a single season for the first time; teams now play a three-game series against all teams, except their designated interleague rival with four games, totalling to 46 games (later increased to 48 games and a six-game series with their interleague rival for the forthcoming 2025 season).

In Australia, the two largest football leagues, the AFL (Australian rules football) and NRL (rugby league), both grew out of competitions held within a single city (respectively Melbourne and Sydney) and only began expanding to the rest of the country when inexpensive air travel made a national league possible. These leagues use a single table instead of being split into divisions. The term "home-and-away season" is usually used instead of regular season.

Many football leagues in Latin America have a very different system. Because most Latin American countries never had a football cup competition, they instead split their season into two parts, typically known as the Apertura and Clausura (Spanish for "opening" and "closing"). Most countries that use this system, Argentina being one notable example, crown separate league champions for each part of the season, using only league play. A few others, such as Uruguay, crown one champion at the end of a playoff involving top teams from each half of the season. Mexico operates its Apertura and Clausura as separate competitions that both end in playoffs. Brazil has a different system, the season starts with the state championships in January (every Brazilian state has its own championship), these state championships ends in April. The Campeonato Brasileiro Série A itself starts in May and ends in early December, and is played in a double round-robin format in the same way as the European championships.

A system similar to the Apertura and Clausura developed independently in Philippine professional basketball, with formerly two, now three tournaments (called "conferences") in one season, with each conference divided into an "elimination round" (the single round-robin group stage) and the playoffs in the North American sense. Winning the playoffs is the ultimate goal of every team for every conference; while there is no season championship, winning all conferences within a single season is rare and has only happened five times since 1975, with the two most recent examples occurring in 1996 and 2013–14. The qualifying round and playoffs setup has permeated down to the local level and in most team sports, although seasons are not divided into conferences.

== Postseason ==
Many sports leagues have playoffs or "finals" that occur after the regular season is complete. A subset of the teams enter into a playoff tournament, usually a knockout tournament, generally a pre-determined number with better overall records (more wins, fewer losses) during the regular season. There are many variations used to determine the champion, the league's top prize. In many of these leagues, winning the league's top prize at the conclusion of the postseason is more important than winning the regular season. This includes the major professional sports leagues in the United States and Canada (MLB's World Series, the NBA Finals, the NFL's Super Bowl, the NHL's Stanley Cup Final, the MLS Cup, and the CFL's Grey Cup), and the major Australian sports (BBL Grand Final, NBL Grand Final, A-League Grand Final, AFL Grand Final and NRL Grand Final).

European leagues have also started holding playoffs after a double round-robin "regular season". The Football League started its promotion playoffs in 1987, with the third up to the sixth-ranked teams participating for the final promotion berth (the two top teams are automatically promoted). Elsewhere, relegation playoffs are also held to determine which teams would be relegated to the lower leagues. One prominent top-level football league, the Eredivisie of the Netherlands, uses two different playoffs—one for relegation purposes, and the other to determine one of the league's entrants in the following season's UEFA Europa League. In Super League Greece, which currently has two places in the UEFA Champions League and three in the Europa League, the teams that finish second through fifth in the regular season enter a home-and-away "playoff" mini-league. Since one Europa League place is reserved for the country's cup winner, only three of the four teams are guaranteed a place in the next season's European competitions (unless both the cup winner and runner-up are already qualified for Europe by other means). The playoff determines the country's second Champions League participant, and the points at which the two or three Europa League entrants join that competition. Conversely, some leagues like the Premier League do not hold a postseason, and therefore these leagues' champions and relegation are instead based on the regular season records.

Although rugby union did not become professional until 1995, that sport has a long history of playoffs, primarily in France and the Southern Hemisphere. The French national championship, now known as Top 14, staged a championship final in its first season of 1892, first used more than one round of playoffs in 1893, and has continuously operated a playoff system (except during the two World Wars) since 1899. South Africa's Currie Cup has determined its champions by playoffs since 1968, and New Zealand's National Provincial Championship, the top level of which is now known as the Mitre 10 Cup, has used playoffs since its creation in 1976. Argentina's Nacional de Clubes has determined its champion by playoffs since its inception in 1993. Currently, two separate competitions feed into the Nacional, the Torneo de la URBA (for Buenos Aires clubs, held since 1899) and Torneo del Interior (for the rest of the country); both use playoffs to determine their champions. Super Rugby, involving regional franchises from Australia, New Zealand, and South Africa and national franchises in Argentina and Japan, has used playoffs to determine its champions since its creation as Super 12 in 1996.

By contrast, other European countries were slow to adopt playoffs in rugby union. The English Premiership only began playoffs in 1999–2000, and did not use them to determine the league champion until 2002–03. The Celtic League, now known as Pro14, resisted a playoff system even longer; its champions were determined solely by league play from its inception in 2001–02 until playoffs began in 2009–10.

When the UEFA Champions League reformatted in 1993, it added a "knockout stage" involving four teams that finished at the top two places in their respective groups. Like North American sports leagues, this setup prevented some participants from facing each other, necessitating a two-round knockout stage to determine the champions. It has since been expanded to the four-round knockout stage today. The Copa Libertadores has applied a knockout stage since the 1988 tournament, expanding to the current four-round format next season. All intercontinental club football competitions now feature a knockout stage.

== Off-season ==
The off-season, vacation time, or close season is the time of year when there is no official competition. During this time, events such as drafts, transfers and off-season free agent signings may occur. Generally, athletes continue training to some extent during the off-season in preparation for the next season with some leagues such as the NFL treating this as a major event with training camp being held in the preseason.

Many player and coach retirements are often also announced during the offseason. And a number of teams often fire and hire new coaching and front office staff during the offseason period. Many sports hall of fames also hold induction ceremonies for mostly former sportspeople during the offseason.

As most countries which have a league in a particular sport will operate their regular season at roughly the same time as the others, international tournaments may be arranged during the off season. For example, most European football league club competitions run from July or August to May, and so major international competitions such as the FIFA World Cup and UEFA European Football Championship are organised to occur in June and July.

In closed leagues expansion and dispersal drafts may happen in the offseason when new teams are added to the league or if existing teams fold during or in the aftermath of a season. In addition, league realignments and venues for Neutral site game venues may be announced also be announced in the offseason.

== Seasons by league ==
The table represents typical seasons for some leagues by month. Blank or white denotes off-season and pre-season months and solid colors mark the rest of the year. Leagues in the same sport use the same color.

- "E" denotes exhibition or preseason games.
- "Q" denotes pre-competition qualifiers.
- "S" denotes the start of the regular-season.
- "P" denotes playoffs, postseason or knockout stages.
- "F" denotes finals.

League	Sport	Regions	Jan	Feb	Mar	Apr	May	Jun	Jul	Aug	Sep	Oct	Nov	Dec
ABL	Baseball	(Australia)	P	F									S	
A-League	Association football	(Australia) (New Zealand)				P	F					S		
ACB	Basketball	(Spain) (Note: A team from Andorra, BC Andorra, has competed in the league since the 2014–15 season.)					P	P F			S			
AFC Champions League Elite	Association football	Asia (Note: Australia is a member of the AFC since 2006, and Israel was expelled from AFC in 1974.)		P	P	P	F			Q	S			
AFL	Australian rules football	(Australia)			S						P F			
AIHL	Ice hockey	(Australia)				S				P F				
ATP World Tour	Tennis	Worldwide	S										F	
ANZ Premiership	Netball	(New Zealand)					S		P F					
AUDL	Ultimate Frisbee	(United States) (Canada)				S				P F				
Bangladesh Premier League	Cricket	(Bangladesh)											S	P F
Basketbol Süper Ligi	Basketball	(Turkey)					P	P F			S			
Big Bash League	Cricket	(Australia)		P F										S
Brasileirão	Association football	(Brazil) (Note: Brazilian association football teams compete in state championships from January to March.)	E	E	E S									
Bundesliga	Association football	(Germany)								S				
CAF Champions League	Association football	Africa		Q	Q S							P	F	
CFL	Canadian football	(Canada)					E	E S					P F	
Canadian Premier League	Association football	(Canada)				S						P F		
Caribbean Premier League	Cricket	(Barbados) (Guyana) (Jamaica) (Saint Kitts and Nevis) (Saint Lucia) (Trinidad and Tobago)						S	P F					
Chinese Super League	Association football	(China)			S									
CEV Champions League	Volleyball	Europe			P	P	P F					Q	Q S	
CONCACAF Champions Cup	Association football	North America		P	P	P	P	F						
CONCACAF League	Association football	North America								P	P	P F		
Copa Libertadores	Association football	South America	S			P	P	F						
Copa Sudamericana	Association football	South America								S		P	P	F
County Championship	Cricket	(England) (Wales)					S							
CPBL	Baseball	(Taiwan)			S							F		
DTM	Motorsport	(Germany)				S								
Euro Beach Soccer League	Beach soccer	Europe						S			P F			
European Rugby Champions Cup (Note: Replaced the former European club competition, the Heineken Cup, effective in 2014–15.)	Rugby union	Europe				P	F					S		
European Tour (Note: The current scheduling, in which the season starts in January, took effect in 2012. In 2010 and 2011, the schedule began late in the previous calendar year.)	Golf	Europe (Note: The bulk of the tour's sole-sanctioned events are in Europe, with some in the Persian Gulf countries. It co-sanctions many other events with tours in Asia, Africa, and Australia. Along with the PGA Tour, the European Tour co-sanctions the major championships and the World Golf Championships; one of the majors is held in the UK, one of the WGC events is held in China, and the rest of these events are in the US.)											F	S
Formula One	Motorsport	Worldwide			S									
GFL	American football	(Germany)				S					P	F		
Greek Basket League	Basketball	(Greece)					P	P F				S		
Handball-Bundesliga	Handball	(Germany)									S			
HSBC World Rugby Sevens Series	Rugby sevens (union)	Worldwide										S		
Indian Premier League	Cricket	(India)				S	P	F						
Indoor Football League	Arena football	(United States)			S					P F				
IndyCar Series	Motorsport	(United States) (Note: Since the 2015 season, the only series race held outside the U.S. is hosted by Canada. Australia, Brazil, and Japan have hosted races in the past.)			S									
J1 League	Association football	(Japan)			S									
KBL	Basketball	(South Korea)			P	F						S		
KBO	Baseball	(South Korea)				S						P F		
KHL	Ice hockey	(Belarus) (China) (Kazakhstan) (Russia)			P	P F					S			
La Liga	Association football	(Spain)								S				
LBPRC	Baseball	(Puerto Rico)	P F									S		
Lega Basket Serie A	Basketball	(Italy)					P	P F				S		
LCS	Esports	(United States)	S			P F		S			P F			
LIDOM	Baseball	(Dominican Republic)	P F									S		
Liga MX	Association football	(Mexico) (Note: Like many football leagues in Latin America, Mexico divides its season into two phases with separate champions in each phase. Unlike most leagues in that sport, Liga MX uses a knockout playoff, involving the top eight teams after league play, to determine its champions.)	S				P F			S			P	P F
Ligue 1	Association football	(France) (Note: The current 2019–20 season features one team from Monaco in AS Monaco, which has been in the league on numerous occasions, most recently since the 2013–14 season.)								S				
LMB	Baseball	(Mexico)			E	S				P	F (Note: The Serie del Rey usually ends in September.)			
LMP	Baseball	(Mexico)	P F									S		
LPGA Tour	Golf	(United States) (Note: Most LPGA events are held in the US, but it also sole-sanctions official money events in Thailand, Singapore, Mexico, China, Canada, Malaysia, and Taiwan, as well as an unofficial event in Brazil. Since 2013, two of its majors, one in the UK and the other in France, have been co-sanctioned with the Ladies European Tour. The LPGA also co-sanctions events with the Korean LPGA and Japan LPGA in those countries and the ALPG Tour in Australia.)	S											
LVBP	Baseball	(Venezuela)	P F									S		
MLB	Baseball	(United States) (Canada)		E	E	S					P	P F	F (Note: The World Series usually ends in late October, but can extend into early November.)	
PLL	Lacrosse	(United States) (Canada)						S			P F			
MLR	Rugby union	(United States) (Canada)		S				P F						
MLS	Association football	(United States) (Canada)			S							P	P F	
Grand Prix motorcycle racing	Motorsport	Worldwide			S									
NASCAR	Motorsport	(United States) (Canada) (Mexico) (Europe) (Note: Since the 2013 season, the top two NASCAR touring series, the Cup Series and Xfinity Series, race only in the US. The third-level Truck Series has a race in Canada. The Xfinity Series has previously held races in Canada and Mexico. NASCAR also operates national series in Canada and Mexico and a European series, plus many regional developmental series in the US.)		E S							P (Note: NASCAR has used a playoff-style system to determine the champion of the Cup Series since 2004; in 2016, it extended this system to its other two U.S. national touring series. The playoffs in the Xfinity and Truck Series are shorter than that of the Cup Series.)	P	P F	
NBA	Basketball	(United States) (Canada)				P	P	F			E	E S		
NBL	Basketball	(Australia) (New Zealand)		P	P	F						S		
NFL	American football	(United States) (Note: The NFL currently takes at least one regular-season game outside the US (London since 2007). The Jacksonville Jaguars are nearing the end of an eight-year period (2013–2020) in which one home game is in London. The 2019 season is the fourth consecutive season for a scheduled game in Mexico City, though the game originally scheduled for Mexico City in 2018 was moved to Los Angeles. For several years in the early 21st century, the Buffalo Bills played one home game per season in Toronto.)	P	F						E	S			
NHL	Ice hockey	(United States) (Canada)				P	P F	F			E	S		
NHRA	Drag racing	(United States) (Canada)		S							P (Note: Since 2007, the NHRA uses a playoff system to determine the champion of each of the four drag racing classes in its top division; the playoff system is not used in lower-ranked divisions.)	P	P F	
NLL	Lacrosse	(United States) (Canada)					P F							S
NRL	Rugby league	(Australia) (New Zealand)			S						P	F		
NCAA basketball	Basketball	(United States)			P	P F							S	
NCAA football	American football	(United States)	P F								S		P (Note: The NCAA has never recognized an official champion in the top-level Division I FBS. Although the four-team College Football Playoff began in 2014, it is not an official NCAA championship event. All other NCAA divisions determine officially recognized champions in playoff tournaments that start in November. The playoffs in Divisions II and III end in December. Since the 2010 season, the Division I FCS playoffs end in January.)	P F
NPB	Baseball	(Japan)			S							P	F	
NWSL	Association football	(United States)			S						P F (Note: The schedule listed here is that for the most recently completed 2018 season. In some years, the playoffs are held in October. In addition, the NWSL season is disrupted twice in a four-year cycle—first by the FIFA Women's World Cup, and then the following year by the Summer Olympics. In those years, fewer regular-season games are played, and the league takes a break for the stated event.)			
Overwatch League	Esports	Worldwide	S							P	P F			
PGA Tour	Golf	(United States) (Note: The vast majority of the PGA Tour's sole-sanctioned events are in the US proper, but the tour also has events in Malaysia, Mexico, Canada, and Puerto Rico. Along with the European Tour, the PGA Tour co-sanctions the major championships and the World Golf Championships; one of the majors is held in the UK, one of the WGC events is held in China, and the rest of these events are in the US.)								P	P F	S		
PBA	Basketball	(Philippines) (Note: Calendar shown was for the 2011–12 season. It has been frequently adjusted since 2012–13 for multiple reasons, therefore the start and end of each conference and season varies from month to month.)	P	P F S		P F	F	S		P F		S		
Premier League	Association football	(England) (Note: While almost all teams in the multi-tiered English football league system are based in England, a small number of teams from Wales also take part. Of these, both Cardiff City and Swansea City have spent seasons in the Premier League.)								S				
Premiership	Association football	(South Africa)								S				
Primera División (Argentina)	Association football	(Argentina) (Note: The 2016–17 season marked the completion of Argentina's transition from its former calendar-year Apertura and Clausura season format to a single league season spanning two calendar years.)								S				
Premiership Rugby	Rugby union	(England)					P	F (Note: Depending on the calendar, the final may fall on the last weekend of May in some seasons.)			S			
Primera División	Association football	(Venezuela)	S				P	P				P	P	F
Serie A	Association football	(Italy)								S				
Serie del Caribe	Baseball	Caribbean		P F										
Serie Nacional de Béisbol	Baseball	(Cuba)	P F										S	
Sheffield Shield	Cricket	(Australia)			F							S		
Super Netball	Netball	(Australia)		S				P F						
Super League	Rugby league	(England) (France) (Note: Super League was founded in 1996 with teams in England and France; France had no presence in the league from 1998–2005.)		S							P	P F		
Supercars Championship	Motorsport	(Australia) (Note: Currently, one race is held in New Zealand. Bahrain, China, the United Arab Emirates, and the USA have staged races in the past. Longer-term plans call for additional races in Hong Kong, India, the Philippines, Singapore, South Africa, and South Korea.)		S										
Super League Greece	Association football	(Greece)				P	P	F		S				
Süper Lig	Association football	(Turkey)								S				
Superpesis	Pesäpallo	(Finland)					S			P	P F			
Super Rugby	Rugby union	(Australia) (New Zealand) (Fiji) (Note: Moana Pasifika plays in New Zealand but represents Pacific Islanders in general.)		S				P (Note: The playoffs, or "finals" as they are officially called, begin in late June in Rugby World Cup years.)	P F (Note: During World Cup years, the final match is held in July; in other years, the finals begin in July.)	P F (Note: In non-World Cup years, the final match is held in August.)				
Top 14	Rugby union	(France)					P	F		S				
Turkish Airlines EuroLeague	Basketball	Europe				P	P F				S			
UEFA Champions League	Association football	Europe		P	P	P	F		Q	Q	S			
UEFA Women's Champions League	Association football	Europe	P	P	P	P	F			Q S	P	P	P	P
UEFA Europa League	Association football	Europe		P	P	P	F		Q	Q	S			
Ultimate Kho Kho	Kho-kho	(India)								S	P F			
URC	Rugby union	(Ireland) (Italy) (Scotland) (South Africa) (Wales) (Note: The league originally involved only the three Celtic nations; Italy joined beginning in the 2010–11 season, and South Africa in 2017–18.)					P F				S			
WNBA	Basketball	(United States)					E S				P	F (Note: During Summer Olympic years, the WNBA Finals run into late October. During years in which the FIBA Women's Basketball World Cup is held, the season is compressed, with the WNBA Finals ending in September. In other years, the WNBA Finals end in early October.)		
WNBL	Basketball	(Australia)		P	P F							S		
WRC	Motorsport	Worldwide	S											
WTA Tour	Tennis	Worldwide										F	S	
World TeamTennis	Tennis	(United States)							S	P F				

=== Summary ===
Sport	Duration
American football	Originally football was played only in the fall, but for many years the season has extended from late summer through early to mid-winter.: The 17-game NFL regular season currently begins with NFL Kickoff, the first Thursday in September (after a month of exhibition games), and ends 18 weeks later around New Year's Day. The playoffs culminate with the Super Bowl on the second Sunday in February.; The college season begins the last week in August. The regular season ends in late November, with playoff and bowl games throughout December and early January.; Indoor football, past professional leagues such as the USFL and XFL, and some women's and amateur leagues play in the February to August season.
Association football	Usually August to May in the Northern Hemisphere, and February to November in the Southern Hemisphere. Exceptions are generally for one of two reasons: In some northern countries with severe winter weather (such as the United States, Canada, Finland, and Sweden), the season is contested within a calendar year (roughly March to November) to avoid the worst weather.; However, other leagues use winter breaks to avoid most of the coldest days to prevent players suffering from hypothermia.; Some countries, primarily in Latin America, use a split season, known as Apertura and Clausura. The traditional association football season from August to May is divided in two sections per season, each with its own champion. Apertura and Clausura are the Spanish words for "opening" and "closing". In French-speaking Haiti, these are known as the Ouverture and the Fermeture, while in English-speaking Belize, they are respectively the Opening and Closing seasons. The now-defunct second version of the North American Soccer League (NASL) adopted a split season in 2013; the season was divided into a Spring Championship and Fall Championship.; In some countries where soccer competes with locally more popular football codes (e.g., Major League Soccer in the U.S., A-League in Australia), the season is arranged so as to minimize the time that it is in conflict with the more popular codes. This arrangement also eases scheduling concerns regarding venues used for multiple football codes. However, in the case of the United States' MLS, their regular seasons can conflict with major tournaments such as the Gold Cup and FIFA World Cup due to the demand of the league's best national players to participate in the national squad.; (See Domestic association football season for details.)
Australian rules football	March to late August, with finals series extending up to late September or early October.
Baseball	Northern hemisphere summer leagues: March or April to early October, with playoffs extending up to early November. Northern hemisphere winter leagues: as the Australian Baseball League runs from November to early February, with playoffs extending up to late February.
Basketball	In most countries, late October to mid-April, with playoffs extending up to mid-June. The three major exceptions to this rule are: The U.S. college basketball season begins in mid-November. The regular season ends in the first days of March, followed by conference tournaments and then national championship tournaments that run into early April.; The Philippine Basketball Association has a unique calendar. Its season runs from varying periods since the 2012–13 season, and is divided into "conferences"—not the North American concept of subgroupings within a larger competition, but rather separate competitions involving the same set of teams, similar to football's Apertura and Clausura in Latin America. Due to frequent adjustments to the calendar beginning in 2012, the months when each season begins and ends differ; it last ran from early October to August in 2011–12. The season was divided into three conferences from 1975 to 2003. It then transitioned to a two-conference season in 2004, and also changed to a season spanning two calendar years, with the transition completed in the 2004–05 season. The PBA returned to a three-conference season effective in 2010–11. The season starts with the Philippine Cup, restricted to Filipino players, followed by two other tournaments in which teams can field one non-Filipino, the Commissioner's and Governors' Cups.; The WNBA season is scheduled during the offseason of its parent league, the NBA. When the league was launched, all of its teams were owned by NBA teams and generally played in the same arenas as their NBA counterparts; however, this has changed over time. The scheduling also allows many WNBA players to participate in overseas leagues, primarily in Europe, Australia, and China, during the traditional basketball season.
Canadian football	July to late October, with playoffs extending into November.
Cricket	Year-round. Domestic seasons typically held in the driest period of the year—summer in temperate climates, dry season in tropical climates.
Golf	Year-round
Ice hockey	Early October to mid-April, with playoffs extending up to early June. The three major exceptions to this rule are: The U.S. men's college hockey season begins in early October. The regular season ends in late February or early March, followed by conference tournaments and then a national championship tournament that runs into mid-April. The women's season typically begins and ends two or three weeks earlier than the men's.; The KHL regular season begins in early September and ends in late February. The playoffs run from March to mid-April.; The Australian Ice Hockey League's season runs from April to mid-August, with playoffs extending up to late August.
Motor racing	Year-round, but generally concentrated from March to October. NASCAR runs from mid-February to late September, with playoffs extending up to late November.
Pesäpallo	The regular season begins on the first weekend of April. It is split at the 24-game mark, with the final regular season games taking place during the second week of August. The playoffs commence in the third week of August, and the finals are scheduled for the first week or second week of September.
Rugby league	Late February to October in both the Northern and Southern Hemispheres.
Rugby union	September to late May, sometimes the first weekend in June, in the Northern Hemisphere. In the Southern Hemisphere, Super Rugby starts in February and ends in early July in World Cup years and mid-August in other years. Domestic competitions in New Zealand and South Africa overlap slightly with the Super Rugby season, starting in July and ending in October or November. In Australia, the domestic competition does not overlap at all with Super Rugby, instead beginning in August and ending in early November.
Swimming	Year-round
Tennis	Year-round

== See also ==
- Domestic association football season
