= Association football headgear =

Headgear for football players

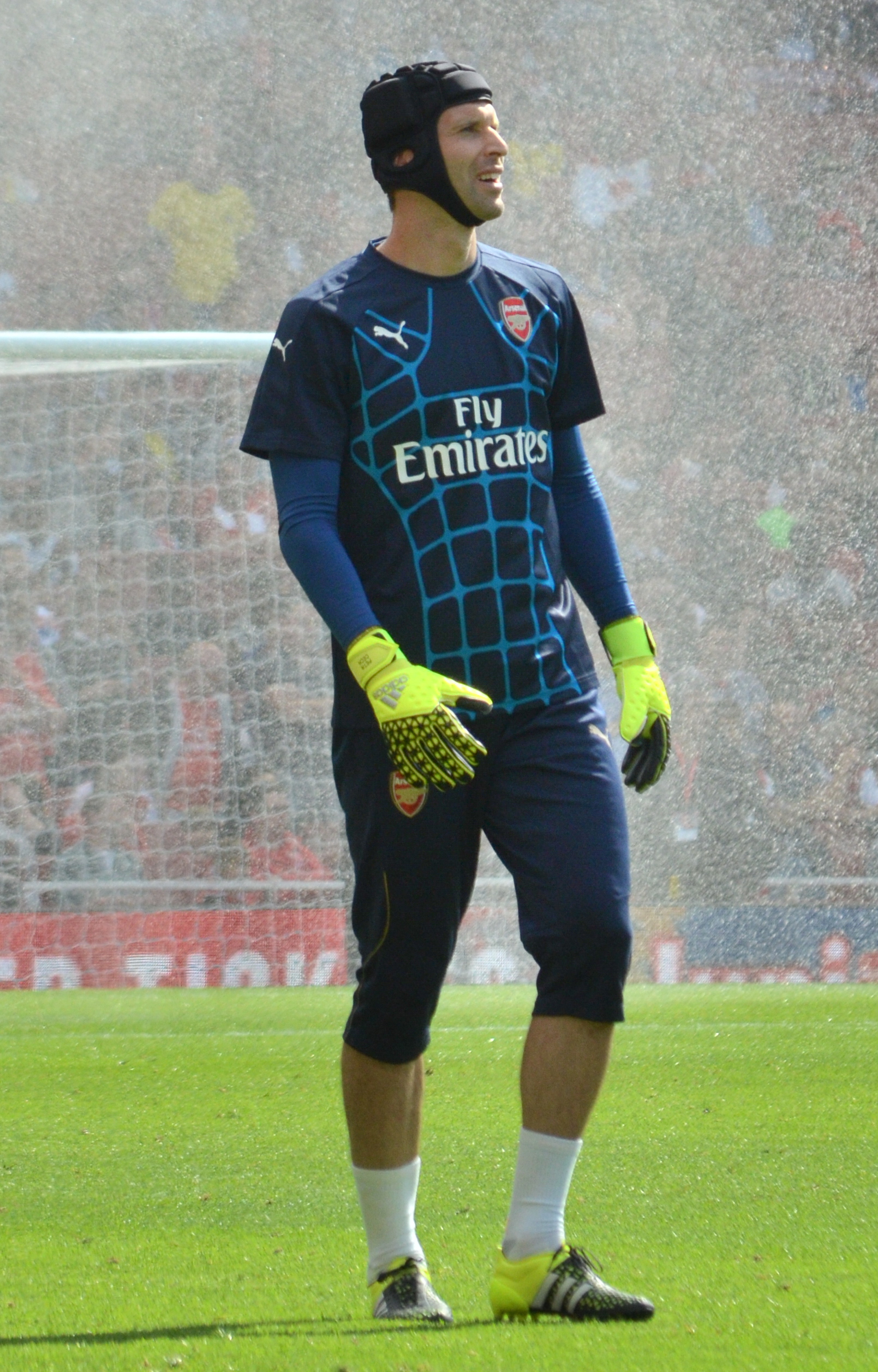
Petr Cech wearing headgear

Association football headgear is worn by association football players to protect the head from injury. The headgear is designed to absorb the impact of blows to the head by external physical forces in order to reduce the chance of a concussion, a noteworthy example in international football being Czech goalkeeper Petr Čech from Chelsea. These collisions can occur from head to head, head to ground, head to goal post, or head to body extremity contact. It is flexible, not a rigid helmet.

== Function and structure ==
Since "soccer is one of a few sports in which the head is intentionally and frequently used to strike the ball", a uniquely designed form of headgear was created. A plastic helmet as in other sports would not suffice since they are bulky and may consist of uneven surfaces; this would make ball control off a header nearly impossible. Most soccer headgear is made from foam that will cushion the head from the full force of the impact. The softness of the foam will increase the time of impact and lessen the blow without altering the direction and distance of the ball as it rebounds off the head.

== Types of headgear ==
ASTM International (formerly the American Society for Testing and Materials) set a product performance standard for headgear in soccer in 2006. This standard does not address head to ball contact, solely head to hard surface contact. There are currently two headguards that meet the ASTM soccer headgear standard, the DonJoy Hat Trick and the Full90 Sports Premier-A. Both comply with FIFA, the U.S. Soccer Federation, and the National Federation of State High School Associations (NFHS).

== Headgear studies ==
Injury to the head can occur from repeatedly making contact with the ball through headers or from a single blow. The danger of this trauma is especially significant to children because their bodies are not fully developed and may not be able to counteract a blow to the head. Minor trauma similar to pugilistic dementia may occur from repetitively heading the ball. A study published in the British Journal of Sports Medicine found that headgear does not help reduce the impact on the head from ball contact. This is because a human head is stiffer than the soccer ball. On impact, the ball will deform more than the head. However, studies in 2006 by the University of North Carolina at Chapel Hill and the University of Pennsylvania found no link between brain injuries and routinely heading the ball. Because of this, the aim of wearing headgear turned to mitigating damage from accidental head on head collisions between players on the pitch. Research has found that there was an overall 33% reduction of impact force on the head from head to head impacts when headgear was used. The U.S. Soccer Federation sees that protective headgear in soccer can provide measurable benefit in head to head contact, and permits players to wear headgear at their own discretion until more conclusive evidence is obtained.

== See also (other equipment) ==
- Kit (association football)
- Shin guards
- Football boots
