= Pasuckuakohowog =

Native American version of soccer

Pasuckuakohowog is a Native American game similar to soccer.

The term literally translates to "they gather to play ball with the foot" and was described by Roger Williams.

There are records that show it was played in the 17th century, 1620 likely earlier, especially among Powhatan and Algonquin groups. The game was played on beaches or clearings with goals about a half-mile wide and set one mile apart. Up to 500 people usually played pasuckuakohowog at one time, while many games had up to 1,000 players.

Pasuckuakohowog was a dangerous game and was played almost like a war. Players would often have to quit due to broken bones or other serious injuries. This is because no rules existed to minimize physical contact as the game was played in a very aggressive and violent manner. Pasuckuakohowog players wore ornaments and war paint to disguise themselves from retaliation after the game.{{History of Football}} The game would often last for hours and sometimes carry over to the next day. After each match there would be a large celebratory feast, including both teams.

The only equipment used in pasuckuakohowog was a tightly bound ball made of animal hides or leather. The ball may have been representative of the sun god of fertility, celebrating life.

== See also ==
- Mesoamerican ballgame
- Soccer in the United States
