= Association football =

Team sport played with a ball

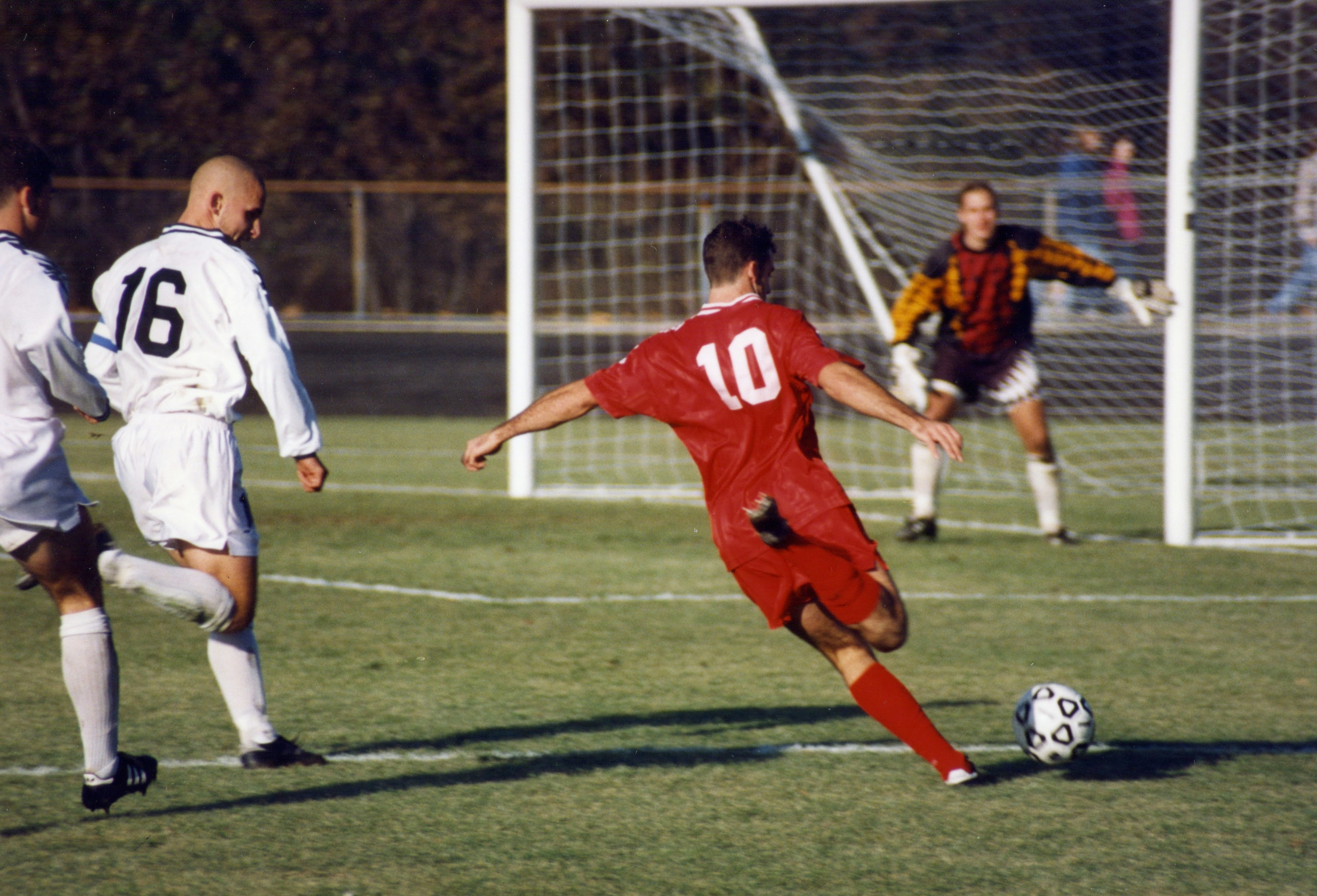
- The attacking player (No. 10) attempts to score a goal by kicking the ball into the net behind the opposing team's goalkeeper.
- Highest governing body: FIFA
- Nicknames: The beautiful game; The World's Game
- First played: December 1863, England

Characteristics
- Contact: Yes
- Team members: 11 per side: Goalkeeper; Defenders; Midfielders; Forwards
- Mixed-sex: No, separate competitions
- Type: Team sport; ball game
- Equipment: Football (or soccer ball); Football boots Shin guards Kits; Gloves (for goalkeepers)
- Venue: Football pitch (also known as football field, football ground, soccer field, or soccer pitch)
- Glossary: Glossary of association football

Presence
- Country or region: Worldwide
- Olympic: Men's since the 1900 Olympics and women's since the 1996 Olympics
- Paralympic: 5-a-side since 2004 and 7-a-side from 1984 to 2016

Association football, commonly known as football or soccer, (Note: For further information, see names for association football.) is a team sport played between two teams of 11 players each who mostly use their feet to kick an inflated ball around a pitch (playing field).

The objective of the game is to score more goals than the opposing team by moving the ball into the rectangular-framed goal which that team defends. Traditionally, the game has been played over two 45-minute halves, for a total match time of 90 minutes. With an estimated 250 million players active in over 200 countries and territories, it is the world's most popular sport.

Association football is played in accordance with the Laws of the Game, a set of rules that has been in effect since 1863 and maintained by the International Football Association Board (IFAB) since 1886. The game is played with a football that is 68–70 cm (27–28 in) in circumference. When the ball is in play, the players mainly use their feet, but may also use any other part of their body, except for their hands or arms, to control, strike, or pass the ball; the head, chest, and thighs are commonly used. Only the goalkeepers may use their hands and arms, but only within their own penalty area. Depending on the format of the competition, an equal number of goals scored may result in a draw being declared with 1 point awarded to each team, or the game may go into extra time or a penalty shoot-out.

Internationally, association football is governed by FIFA. Under FIFA, there are six continental confederations: AFC, CAF, CONCACAF, CONMEBOL, OFC, and UEFA. National associations (e.g. the FA in England, U.S. Soccer in the United States, etc.) are responsible for managing the game in their own countries both professionally and at an amateur level, and coordinating competitions in accordance with the Laws of the Game. The most prestigious senior international competition is the FIFA World Cup. The men's World Cup is the most-viewed sporting event in the world, surpassing the Olympic Games. The most prestigious competition in European club football is the UEFA Champions League, which attracts an extensive television audience worldwide. The final of the men's Champions League is the most-watched annual sporting event in the world.

Injuries sustained while playing association football are common, with an estimated more than 2 million football-related injuries requiring emergency department visits in the United States between 2005 and 2014, and an average of 6.9 injuries per 1,000 player-participations in games. However, regular neuromuscular training programs, such as FIFA 11+ and NWP, have been found to reduce injury rates, particularly severe injuries, by several tens of percent among both adult and youth players.

== Name ==
Association football is part of a family of football games that emerged from various ball games played worldwide since antiquity. The word "association" in this term refers to the Football Association (the FA), founded in London in 1863, which published the first set of rules for the sport that same year. The term was coined to distinguish the type of football played in accordance with the FA rules from other types that were gaining popularity at the time, particularly rugby football.

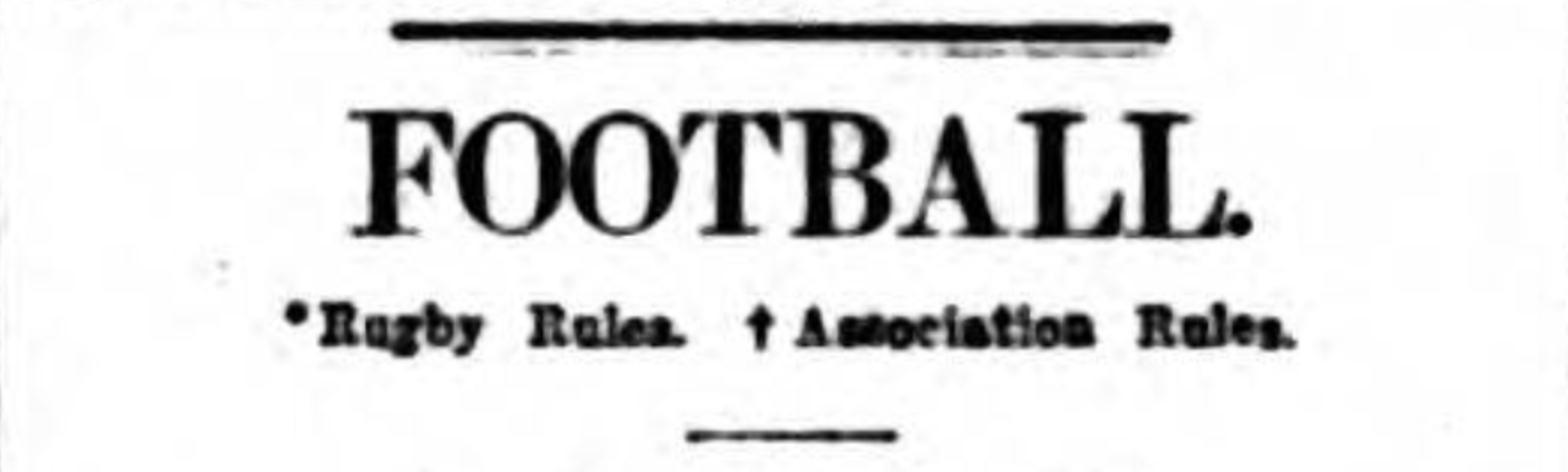
Heading from The Sportsman front page of 25 November 1910, illustrating the continued use of the word "football" to encompass both rugby and association football.

The term soccer comes from Oxford "-er" slang, which was prevalent at the University of Oxford in England from about 1875, and is thought to have been borrowed from the slang of Rugby School. Initially spelt assoccer (a shortening of "association"), it was later reduced to the modern spelling. Early alternative spellings included socca and socker. This form of slang also gave rise to rugger for rugby football, fiver and tenner for five pound and ten pound notes, and the now-archaic footer that was also a name for association football.

Within the English-speaking world, association football is now usually called simply "football" in Great Britain and most of Ulster in the north of Ireland, whereas people usually call it "soccer" in regions and countries where other versions of football are prevalent, such as Australia, Canada, South Africa, most of Ireland (excluding Ulster), and the United States. A notable exception is New Zealand, where in the first two decades of the 21st century, under the influence of international television, "football" has been gaining prevalence, despite the dominance of other types of football, namely rugby union and rugby league.

== History ==
FIFA has stated that soccer originated in Britain, starting around the eighth century, and that no historical connection exists with any game played in antiquity outside Europe. The modern rules of association football are based on the mid-19th-century efforts to standardise the widely varying forms of football played in the public schools of England.

=== Ancient precursors ===
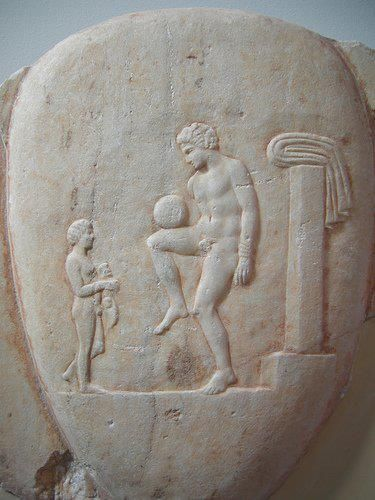
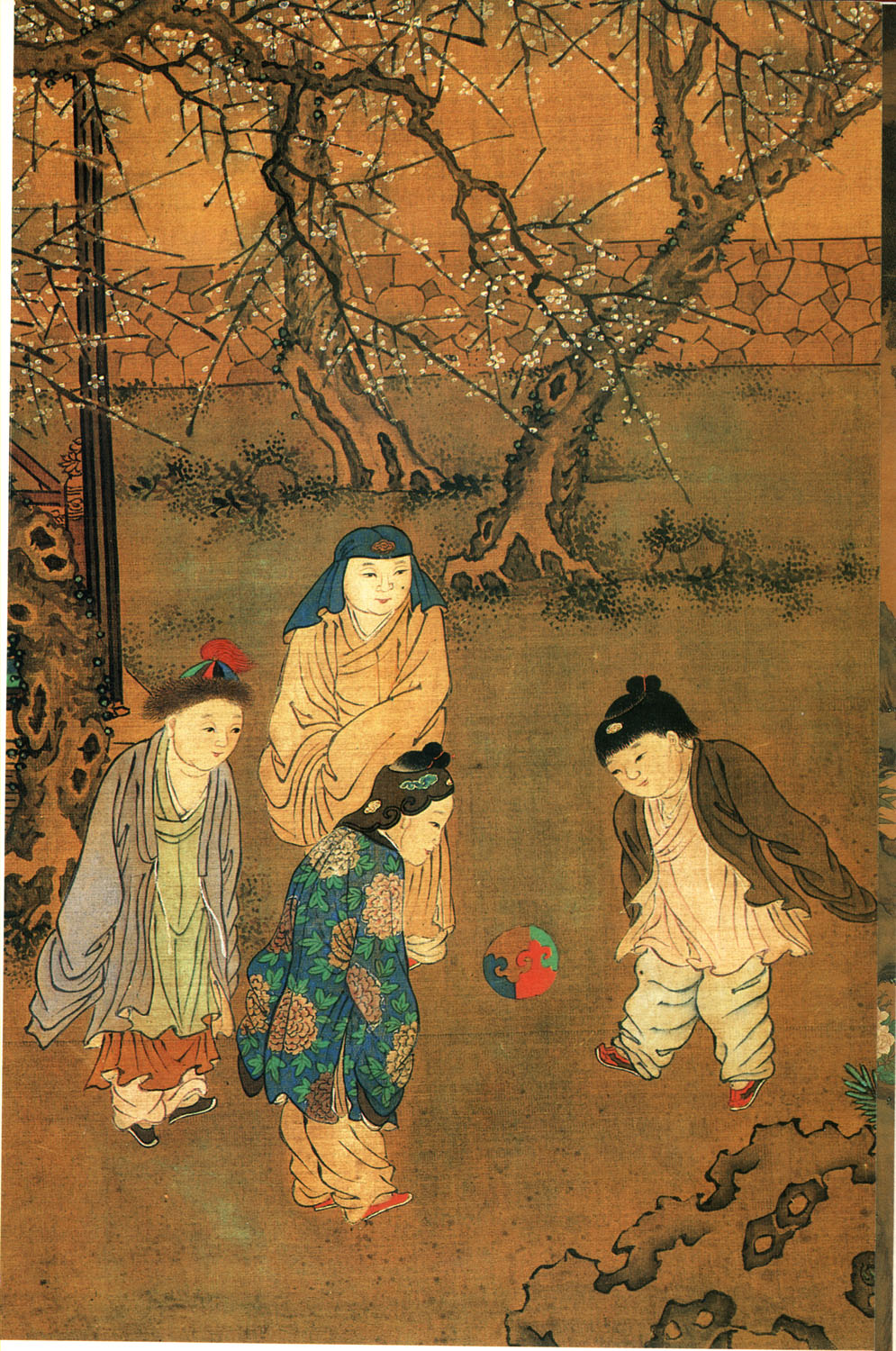
On the left, an episkyros player on an ancient stone carving, c. 375–400 BCE, exhibited at the National Archaeological Museum, Athens; on the right, children playing cuju in Song dynasty China, 12th century

Kicking ball games arose independently multiple times across multiple cultures. (Note: See Football#Early history for more information.) The Chinese competitive game cuju (蹴鞠, literally "kickball"; also known as tsu chu) resembles modern association football as well as a mix of basketball and volleyball. This is the earliest form of a kicking game for which there is historical evidence. The game was first recorded as an exercise in the Zhan Guo Ce, a military history from the Han dynasty. Cuju players would pass the ball around, having to avoid it touching the ground at any point. It was then passed to a designated player, who attempted to kick it through the fengliu yan, a circular goal atop 10–11-metre poles. During the Han dynasty (206 BCE – 220 CE), cuju games were standardised and rules were established. The Silk Road facilitated the transmission of cuju outside of China, especially the form of the game popular in the Tang dynasty, the period when the inflatable ball was invented and replaced the stuffed ball. Other East Asian games include kemari in Japan and chuk-guk in Korea, both influenced by cuju. Kemari originated after the year 600 during the Asuka period. It was a ceremonial rather than a competitive game, and involved the kicking of a mari, a ball made of animal skin. In North America, pasuckuakohowog was a ball game played by the Algonquians; it was described as "almost identical to the kind of folk football being played in Europe at the same time, in which the ball was kicked through goals".

=== Mediaeval precursors ===
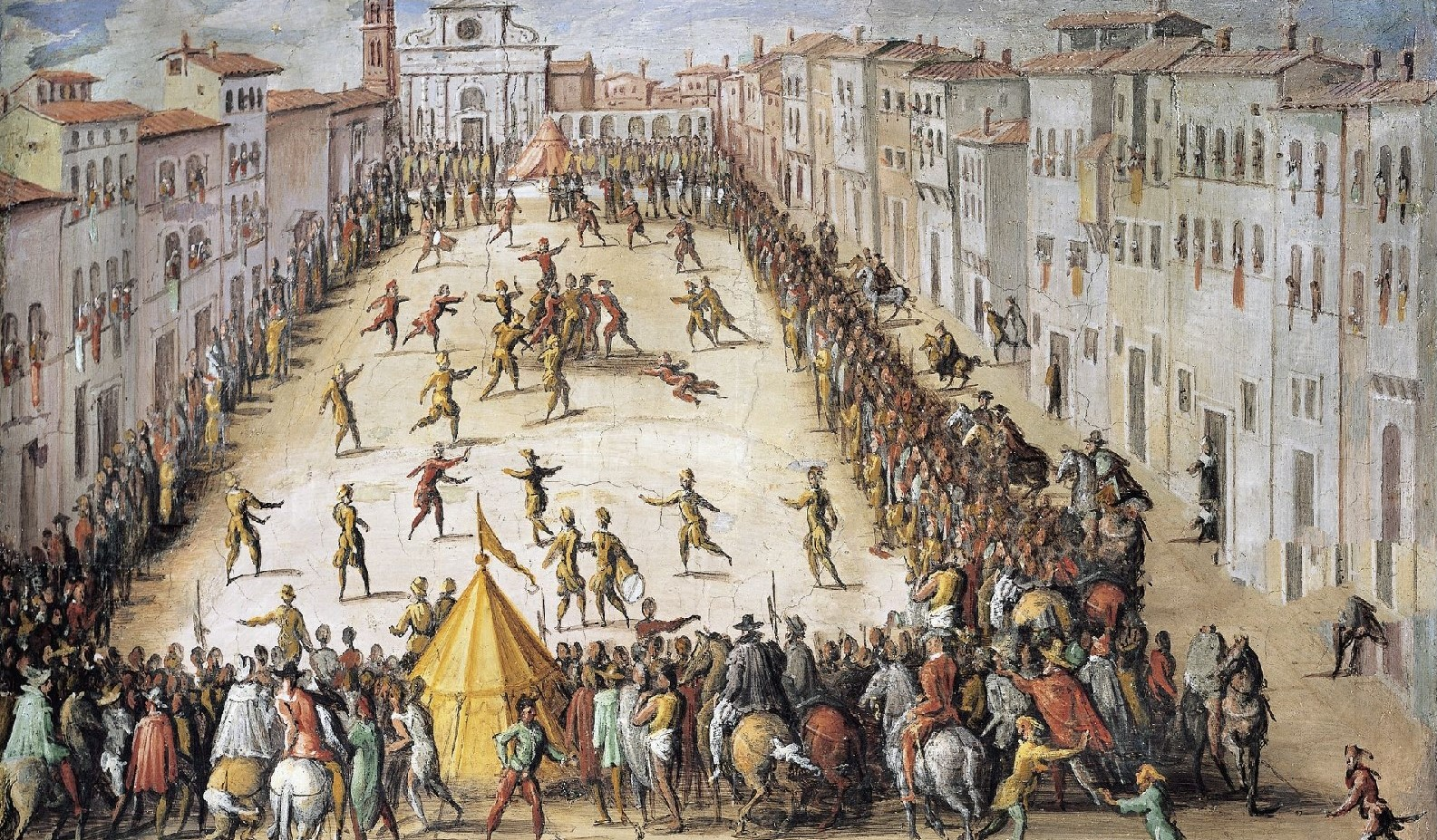
Calcio match in Piazza Santa Maria Novella, in Florence, Italy. Painting by Jan Van der Straet.

In the Middle Ages, one notable game with similarities to modern football was calcio storico fiorentino, which originated in Florence, Italy. Another mediaeval sport that can be considered a form of early football is la soule (or choule), played in France from the 12th century, in which the ball was propelled by hands, feet, and sticks. As with pre-codified mob football, the antecedent of all modern football codes, these mediaeval games involved more handling of the ball than kicking it.

=== Modern era ===
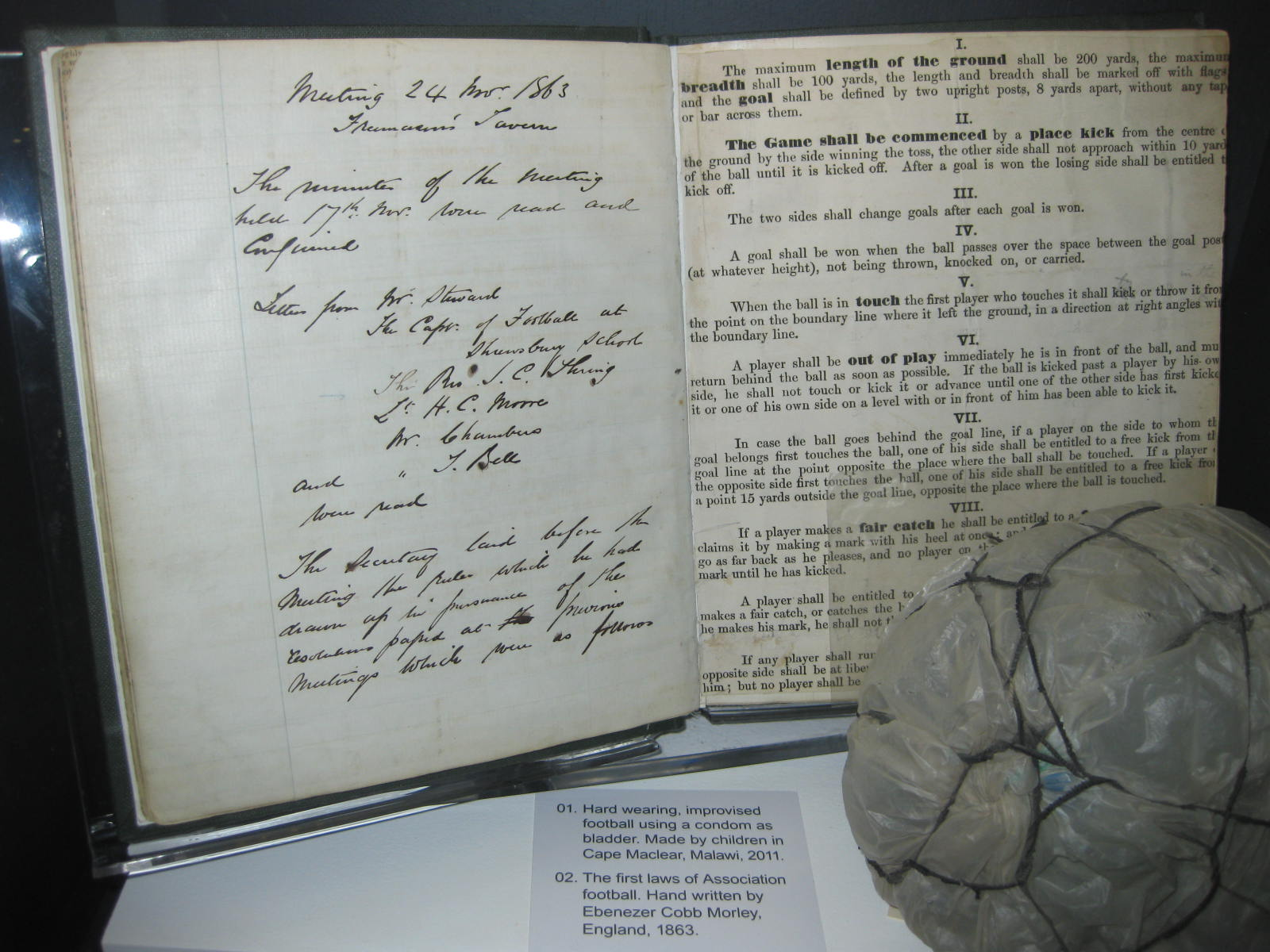
An early draft of the original hand-written "Laws of the Game", drawn up on behalf of the Football Association by Ebenezer Cobb Morley in 1863, on display at the National Football Museum in Manchester.

The Cambridge rules, first drawn up at the University of Cambridge in 1848, were particularly influential in the development of subsequent codes, including association football. The Cambridge rules were written at Trinity College, Cambridge, at a meeting attended by representatives from Eton, Harrow, Rugby, Winchester, and Shrewsbury schools. They were not universally adopted. During the 1850s, many clubs unconnected to schools or universities were formed throughout the English-speaking world to play various forms of football. Some came up with their own distinct codes of rules, most notably the Sheffield Football Club, formed by former public school pupils in 1857, which led to the formation of a Sheffield FA in 1867. In 1862, John Charles Thring of Uppingham School also devised an influential set of rules.

These ongoing efforts contributed to the formation of the Football Association (the FA) in 1863, which first met on the morning of 26 October 1863 at the Freemasons' Tavern in Great Queen Street, London. The only school to be represented on this occasion was Charterhouse. The Freemasons' Tavern was the setting for five more meetings of the FA between October and December 1863; the English FA eventually issued the first comprehensive set of rules named Laws of the Game, forming modern football. The laws included bans on running with the ball in hand and hacking (kicking an opponent in the shins), tripping and holding. Eleven clubs, under the charge of FA secretary Ebenezer Cobb Morley, ratified the original thirteen laws of the game. The sticking point was hacking, which a twelfth club at the meeting, Blackheath FC, had wanted to keep, resulting in their withdrawal from the FA. Other English rugby clubs followed this lead and did not join the FA, and instead in 1871, along with Blackheath, formed the Rugby Football Union. The 1863 FA rules included handling of the ball by "marks" and the lack of a crossbar, making the game remarkably similar to Victorian rules football, which was being developed around the same time in Australia. The Sheffield FA played by its own rules until the 1870s, with the FA absorbing some of its rules until there was little difference between the games.

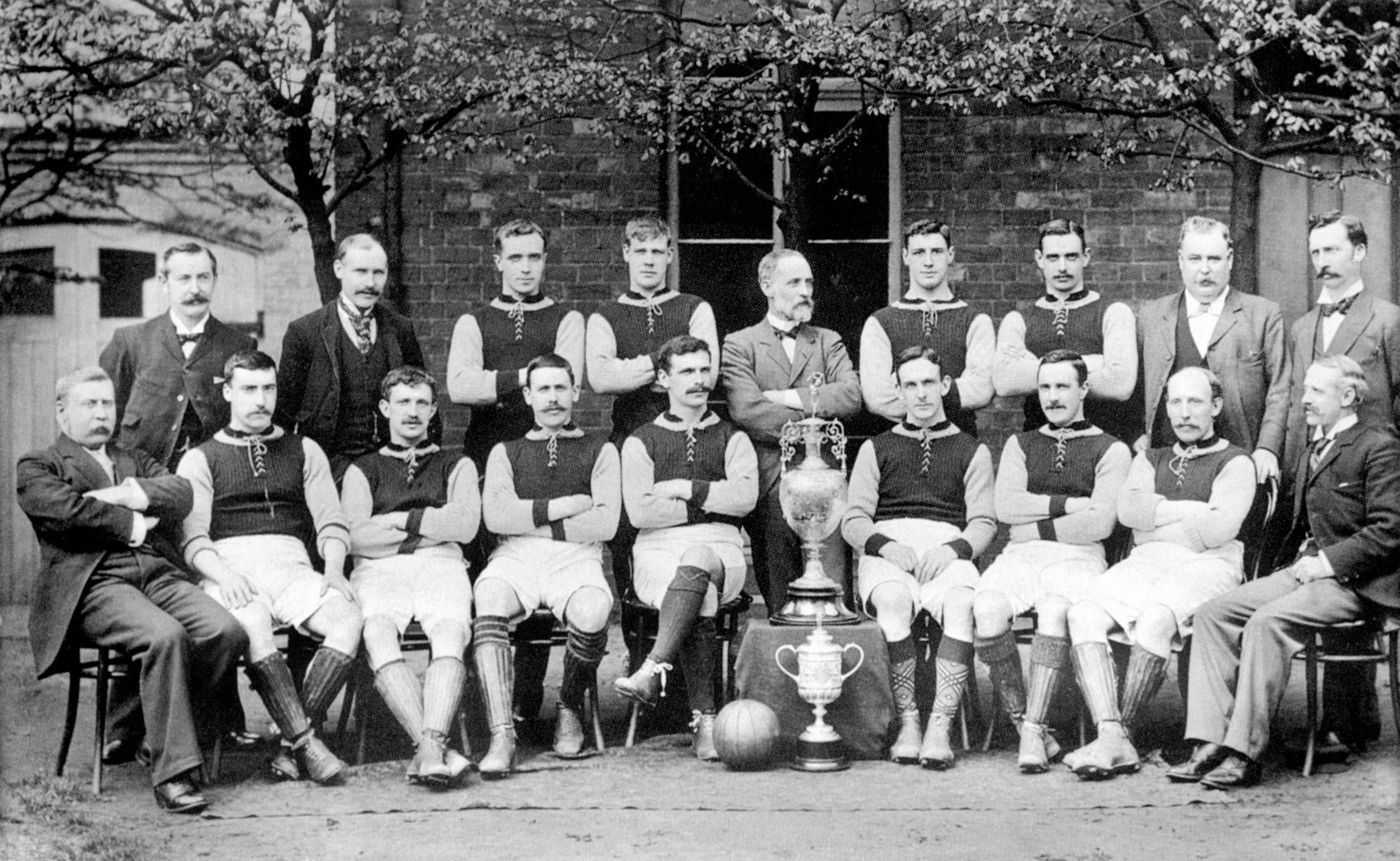
The Aston Villa team in 1897, after winning both the FA Cup and the English Football League

The world's oldest football competition is the FA Cup, which was founded by the footballer and cricketer Charles W. Alcock, and has been contested by English teams since 1872. The first official international football match also took place in 1872, between Scotland and England in Glasgow, again at the instigation of Alcock. England is also home to the world's first football league, which was founded in Birmingham in 1888 by Aston Villa director William McGregor. The original format contained 12 clubs from the Midlands and Northern England.

The Laws of the Game are determined by the International Football Association Board (IFAB). The board was formed in 1886 after a meeting in Manchester of the Football Association, the Scottish Football Association, the Football Association of Wales, and the Irish Football Association. FIFA, the international football body, was formed in Paris in 1904 and declared that they would adhere to the Laws of the Game of the Football Association. The growing popularity of the international game led to the admittance of FIFA representatives to the IFAB in 1913. The board consists of four representatives from FIFA and one representative from each of the four British associations.

=== Contemporary era ===
For most of the 20th century, Europe and South America were the dominant regions in association football. The FIFA World Cup, inaugurated in 1930, became the main stage for players of both continents to show their worth and the strength of their national teams. In the second half of the century, the European Cup and the Copa Libertadores were created, and the champions of these two club competitions would contest the Intercontinental Cup to prove which team was the best in the world.

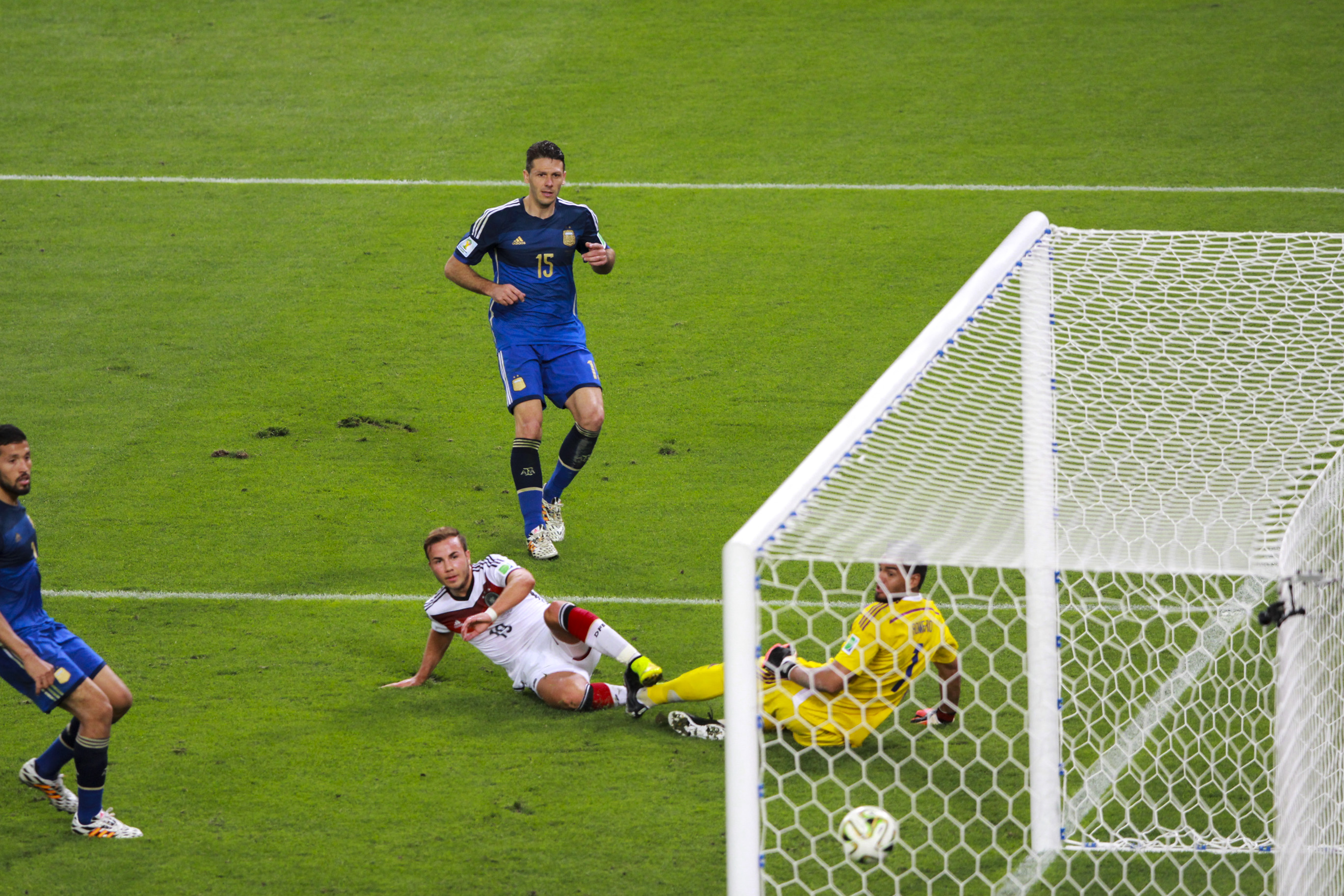
Game-winning German goal in 2014 FIFA World Cup final

In the 21st century, South America has continued to produce some of the best footballers in the world, but its clubs have fallen behind the still dominant European clubs, which often sign the best players from Latin America and elsewhere. Meanwhile, football has improved in Africa, Asia, and North America, and nowadays, these regions are at least on equal grounds with South America in club football. When it comes to national teams, countries in the Caribbean and Oceania regions (excluding Australia) have yet to make a mark in international football, whilst Europeans and South Americans continue to dominate the men's FIFA World Cup, as no team from any other region has managed to even reach the final.

Football is played at a professional level all over the world. Millions of people regularly go to football stadiums to follow their favourite teams, whilst billions more watch the game on television or on the internet. A very large number of people also play football at an amateur level. According to a survey conducted by FIFA published in 2001, over 240 million people from more than 200 countries regularly play football. Football has the highest global television audience in sport.

In many parts of the world, football evokes great passions and plays an important role in the life of individual fans, local communities, and even nations. Ryszard Kapuściński says that Europeans who are polite, modest, or humble fall easily into rage when playing or watching football games. The Ivory Coast national football team helped secure a truce to the nation's civil war in 2006, and it helped further reduce tensions between government and rebel forces in 2007 by playing a match in the rebel capital of Bouaké, an occasion that brought both armies together peacefully for the first time.

By contrast, football is widely considered to have been the final proximate cause for the Football War in June 1969 between El Salvador and Honduras. The sport also exacerbated tensions at the beginning of the Croatian War of Independence of the 1990s, when a match between Dinamo Zagreb and Red Star Belgrade degenerated into rioting in May 1990.

The popularity of association football has been connected to identity fusion with replacement fandom collective identities.

=== Women's association football ===
Women's association football has historically seen opposition, with national associations severely curbing its development and several outlawing it completely. Nevertheless, women have been playing football and similar games for as long as such games have existed. Frescoes from the Han dynasty (25–220 CE) depict female figures playing the ancient Chinese game cuju. There are also reports of annual football matches played by women in Midlothian, Scotland, during the 1790s.

==== Origins and restrictions ====
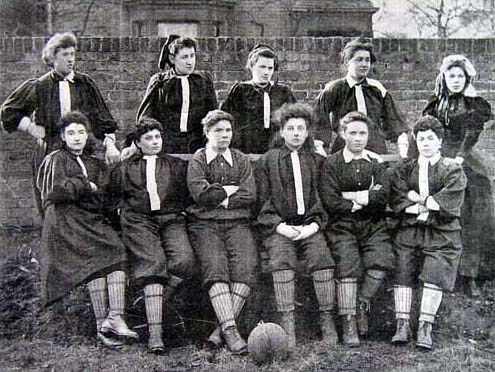
North team of the British Ladies', the first organised women's football team, here pictured in March 1895

There is documented evidence of women's early involvement in association football. Informal matches between Scotland and England are reported to have taken place in 1881, but are not officially recognised by the respective football associations. The first women's match recorded by the Scottish Football Association took place in 1892 in Glasgow. In England, the first recorded game of football between women took place in 1895.

The best-documented early European team was founded by activist Nettie Honeyball in England in 1894: the British Ladies' Football Club. Honeyball considered women's involvement in football as part of the emancipation movement. She and others like her paved the way for women's football. However, the women's game was frowned upon by the British football associations and continued without their support. It has been suggested that this was motivated by a perceived threat to the "masculinity" of the game.

Women's football became popular on a large scale at the time of the First World War, when female employment in heavy industry spurred the growth of the game, much as it had done for men decades earlier. The most successful team of the era was Dick, Kerr Ladies F.C. of Preston, England. They played in one of the first women's international matches against a French XI team in 1920, and also made up most of the England team against a Scottish Ladies XI in the same year, winning 22–0. In the early 20th century, women's football in the United Kingdom was mostly associated with charity matches.

Despite being more popular than some men's football events, with one match seeing a 53,000 strong crowd in 1920, women's football in England suffered a blow in 1921 when the Football Association outlawed the playing of the game on association members' pitches, stating that "the game of football is quite unsuitable for females and should not be encouraged". Players and football writers have argued that this ban was, in fact, due to envy of the large crowds that women's matches attracted, and because the FA had no control over the money made from the women's game. The FA ban led to the formation of the short-lived English Ladies Football Association and play moved to rugby grounds. Women's football also faced bans in several other countries, notably in Brazil from 1941 to 1979, in France from 1941 to 1970, and in West Germany from 1955 to 1970.

==== Revival and ongoing growth ====
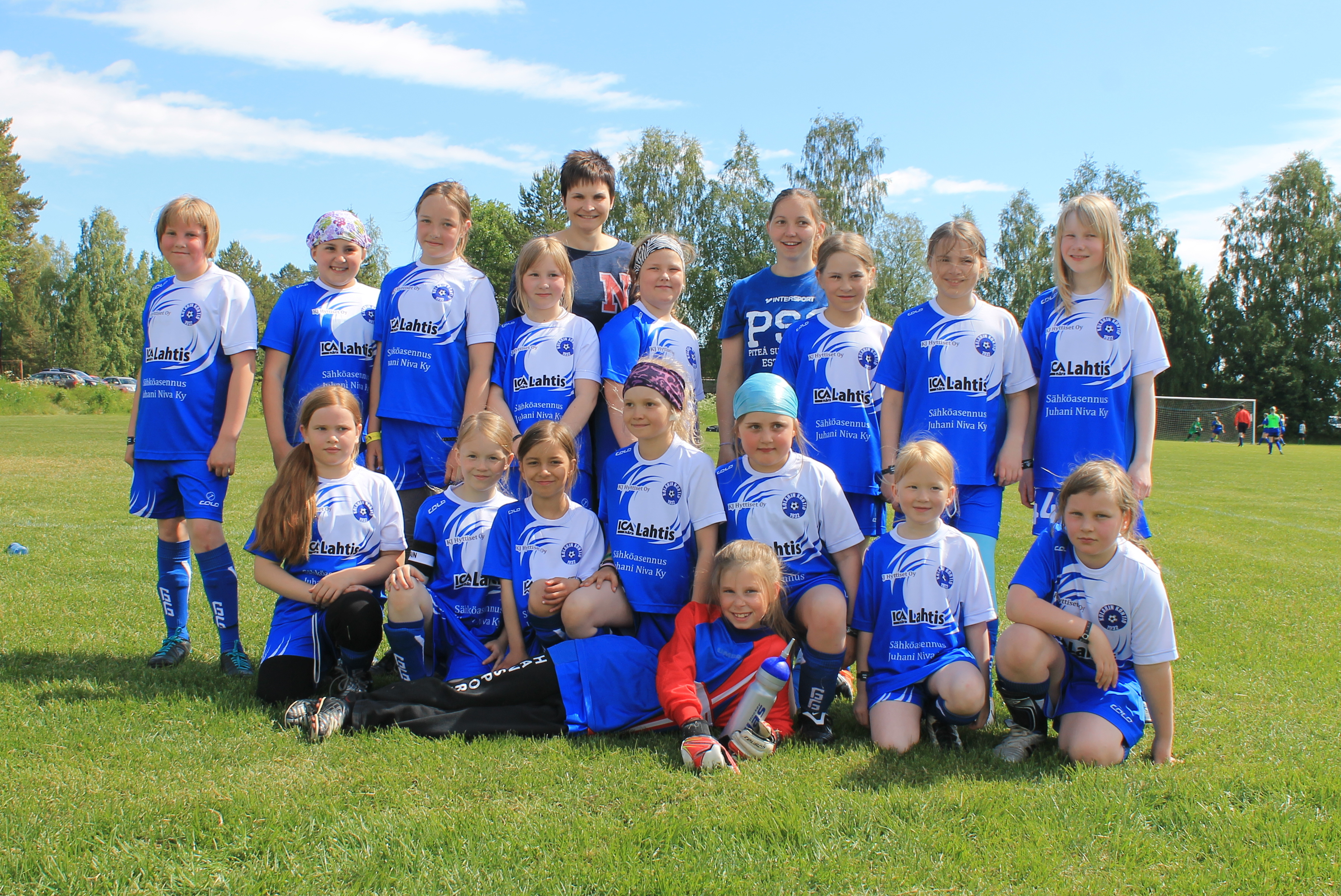
A young Finnish girls' football team in Sweden

At youth tournaments, 5-year-olds play in teams of 3 in special paddocks measuring 10×15 metres.

In spite of the resistance from governing bodies, British women continued to play football. Restrictions against female participation in the sport began to be reduced in the late 1960s and the 1970s. The Italian women's football league was established in 1968. In December 1969, the Women's Football Association was formed in England, with the sport eventually becoming the most prominent team sport for women in the United Kingdom. Two unofficial women's World Cups were organised by the FIEFF in 1970 and in 1971. Also in 1971, UEFA members voted to officially recognise women's football, while the Football Association rescinded the ban that prohibited women from playing on association members' pitches in England. The first Asian Women's Championship happened in 1975, initially without the approval of the AFC, but later recognised by them.

Women's football still faces many struggles, but its worldwide growth has seen major competitions being launched at both the national and international levels, mirroring the men's competitions. The FIFA Women's World Cup was inaugurated in 1991: the first tournament was held in China, featuring 12 teams from the six confederations. The World Cup has been held every four years since; by 2019, it had expanded to 24 national teams, and 1.12 billion viewers watched the competition. Four years later, FIFA targeted the 32-team 2023 Women's World Cup at an audience of 2 billion, while more than 1.5 million tickets were sold, setting a Women's World Cup record. Women's football has been an Olympic event since 1996.

North America is the dominant region in women's football, with the United States winning the most FIFA Women's World Cups and Olympic tournaments. Europe and Asia come second and third in terms of international success, and the women's game has been improving in South America.

== Gameplay ==
One half of a professional football match (45 minutes) between Slovenian clubs NK Nafta 1903 and NK Dob. The score after the half is 0–0.

Association football is played in accordance with a set of rules known as the Laws of the Game. The game is played using a spherical ball of 68–70 cm (27–28 in) circumference, known as the football (or soccer ball). Two teams of eleven players each compete to get the ball into the other team's goal (between the posts and under the bar), thereby scoring a goal. There are situations where a goal can be disallowed, such as an offside call or a foul in the build-up to the goal. The team that has scored more goals at the end of the game is the winner; if both teams have scored an equal number of goals then the game is a draw. Each team is led by a captain who has only one official responsibility as mandated by the Laws of the Game: to represent their team in the coin toss before kick-off or penalty kicks.

The primary law is that players other than goalkeepers may not deliberately handle the ball with their hands or arms during play, though they must use both their hands during a throw-in restart. Although players usually use their feet to move the ball around, they may use any part of their body (notably, "heading" with the forehead) other than their hands or arms. Within normal play, all players are free to play the ball in any direction and move throughout the pitch, though players may not pass to teammates who are in an offside position.

During gameplay, players attempt to create goal-scoring opportunities through individual control of the ball, such as by dribbling, passing the ball to a teammate, and by taking shots at the goal, which is guarded by the opposing goalkeeper. Opposing players may try to regain control of the ball by intercepting a pass or through tackling the opponent in possession of the ball; however, physical contact between opponents is restricted. Football is generally a free-flowing game, with play stopping only when the ball has left the field of play or when play is stopped by the referee for an infringement of the rules. After a stoppage, play recommences with a specified restart.

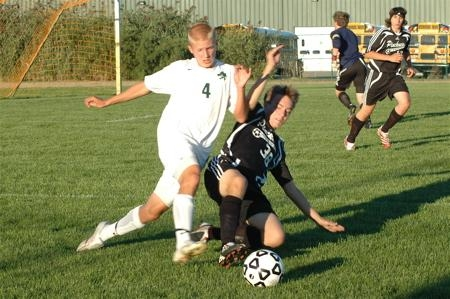
A player executing a slide tackle to dispossess an opponent

At a professional level, most matches produce only a few goals. For example, the 2022–23 season of the English Premier League produced an average of 2.85 goals per match. The Laws of the Game do not specify any player positions other than goalkeeper, but a number of specialised roles have evolved. Broadly, these include three main categories: strikers, or forwards, whose main task is to score goals; defenders, who specialise in preventing their opponents from scoring; and midfielders, who dispossess the opposition and keep possession of the ball to pass it to the forwards on their team. Players in these positions are referred to as outfield players, to distinguish them from the goalkeeper.

These positions are further subdivided according to the area of the field in which the player spends the most time. For example, there are central defenders and left and right midfielders. The ten outfield players may be arranged in any combination. The number of players in each position determines the style of the team's play; more forwards and fewer defenders creates a more aggressive and offensive-minded game, while the reverse creates a slower, more defensive style of play. While players typically spend most of the game in a specific position, there are few restrictions on player movement, and players can switch positions at any time. The layout of a team's players is known as a formation. Defining the team's formation and tactics is usually the prerogative of the team's manager.

== Laws ==
There are seventeen laws in the official Laws of the Game, each containing a collection of stipulations and guidelines. The same laws are designed to apply to all levels of football for both sexes, although certain modifications for groups such as juniors, seniors and people with physical disabilities are permitted. (Note: See List of types of football#Games descended from the FA rules for a list of association football variations.) The laws are often framed in broad terms, which allow flexibility in their application depending on the nature of the game. The Laws of the Game are published by FIFA, but are maintained by the IFAB. In addition to the seventeen laws, numerous IFAB decisions and other directives contribute to the regulation of association football. Within the United States, Major League Soccer used a distinct ruleset during the 1990s, and the NFHS and NCAA still use rulesets that are comparable to, but different from, the IFAB Laws.

=== Players, equipment, and officials ===
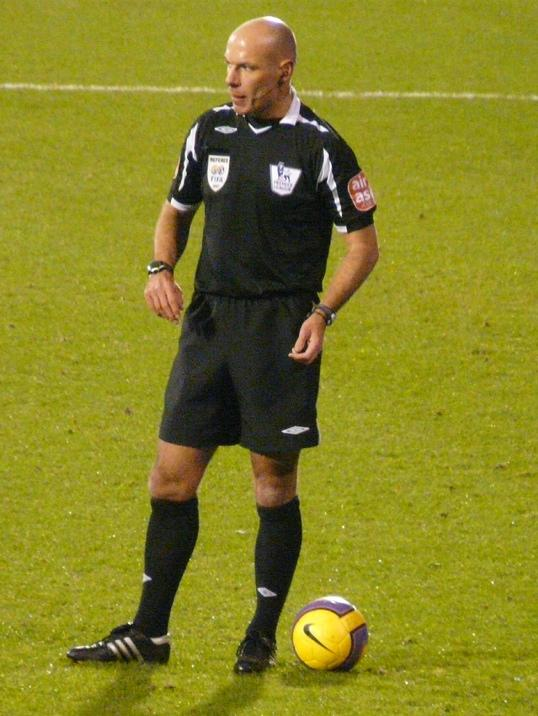
The referee officiates in a football match

Each team consists of a maximum of eleven players (excluding substitutes), one of whom must be the goalkeeper. Competition rules may state a minimum number of players required to constitute a team, which is usually seven. Goalkeepers are the only players allowed to play the ball with their hands or arms, provided they do so within the penalty area in front of their own goal. Though there are a variety of positions in which the outfield (non-goalkeeper) players are strategically placed by a coach, these positions are not defined or required by the Laws.

The basic equipment or kit players are required to wear includes a shirt, shorts, (Note: All outfield players must wear shorts, while goalkeepers are permitted to wear tracksuit bottoms.) socks, footwear and adequate shin guards. Wearing an athletic supporter with protective cup is recommended for male players by medical experts and professionals. Headgear is not a required piece of equipment, but players may choose to wear it to protect themselves from head injury. Players are forbidden to wear or use anything that is dangerous to themselves or another player, such as jewellery or watches. The goalkeeper must wear clothing that is easily distinguishable from that worn by the other players and the match officials.

A number of players may be replaced by substitutes during the course of the game. The maximum number of substitutions permitted in most competitive international and domestic league games is five in 90 minutes, with each team being allowed one more if the game should go into extra-time; the permitted number may vary in other competitions or in friendly matches. Common reasons for a substitution include injury, tiredness, ineffectiveness, a tactical switch, or timewasting at the end of a finely poised game. In standard adult matches, a player who has been substituted may not take further part in a match. IFAB recommends "that a match should not continue if there are fewer than seven players in either team". Any decision regarding points awarded for abandoned games is left to the individual football associations.

A game is officiated by a referee, who has "full authority to enforce the Laws of the Game in connection with the match to which he has been appointed" (Law 5), and whose decisions are final. The referee is assisted by two assistant referees. In many high-level games there is also a fourth official who assists the referee and may replace another official should the need arise.

Goal line technology is used to measure if the whole ball has crossed the goal-line, thereby determining whether a goal has been scored or not; this was brought in to prevent controversy. Video assistant referees (VAR) have also been increasingly introduced in high-level matches to assist officials through video replays to correct "clear and obvious" mistakes. There are four types of calls that can be reviewed: mistaken identity in awarding a red or yellow card, goals and whether there was a violation during the build-up, direct red card decisions, and penalty decisions.

=== Ball ===
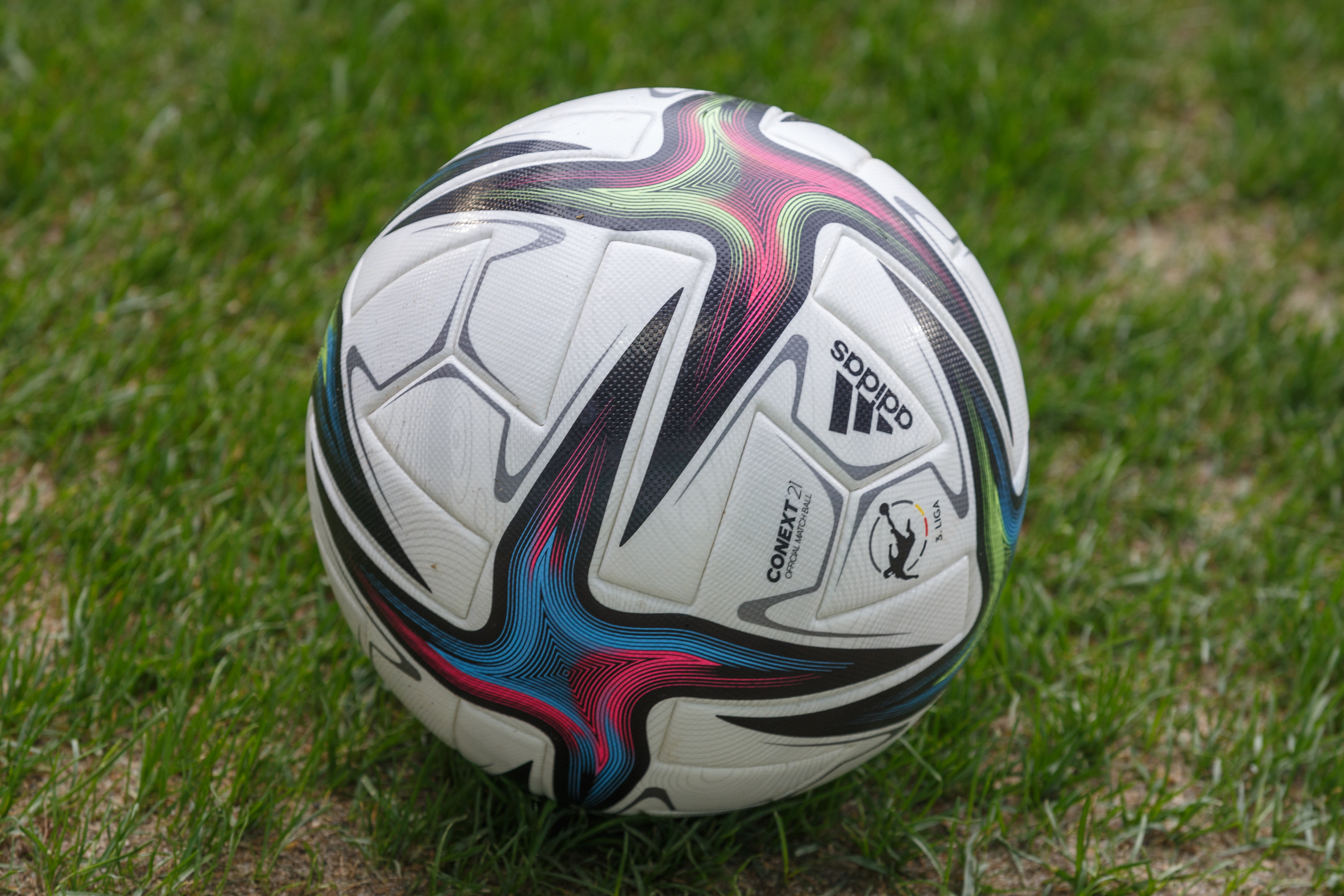
A typical ball

The ball is spherical with a circumference of between 68 and 70 cm (27 and 28 in), a weight in the range of 410 to 450 g (14 to 16 oz), and a pressure between 0.6 and 1.1 standard atmospheres (8.5 and 15.6 pounds per square inch) at sea level. In the past the ball was made up of leather panels sewn together, with a latex bladder for pressurisation, but modern balls at all levels of the game are now synthetic.

=== Pitch ===
Standard pitch measurements

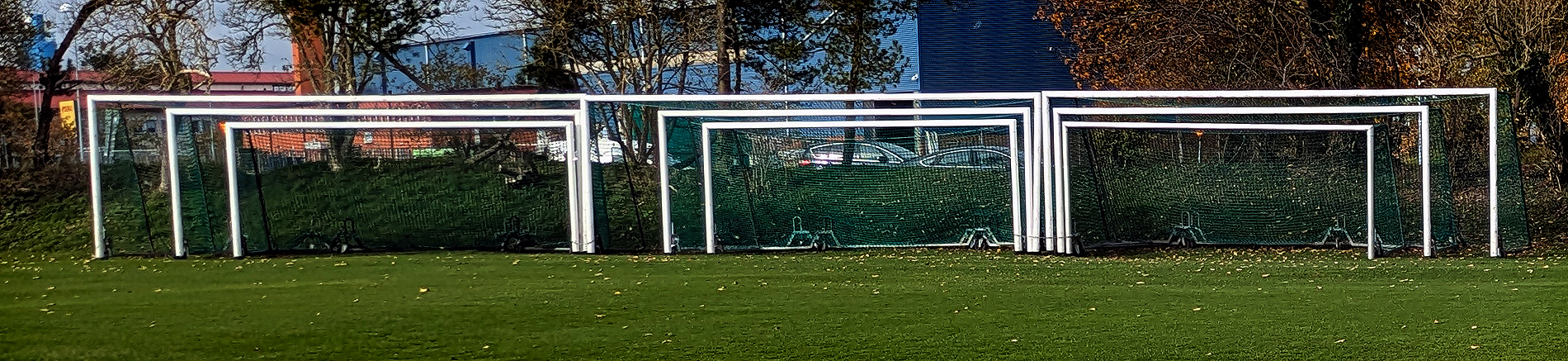
Goals in different sizes.

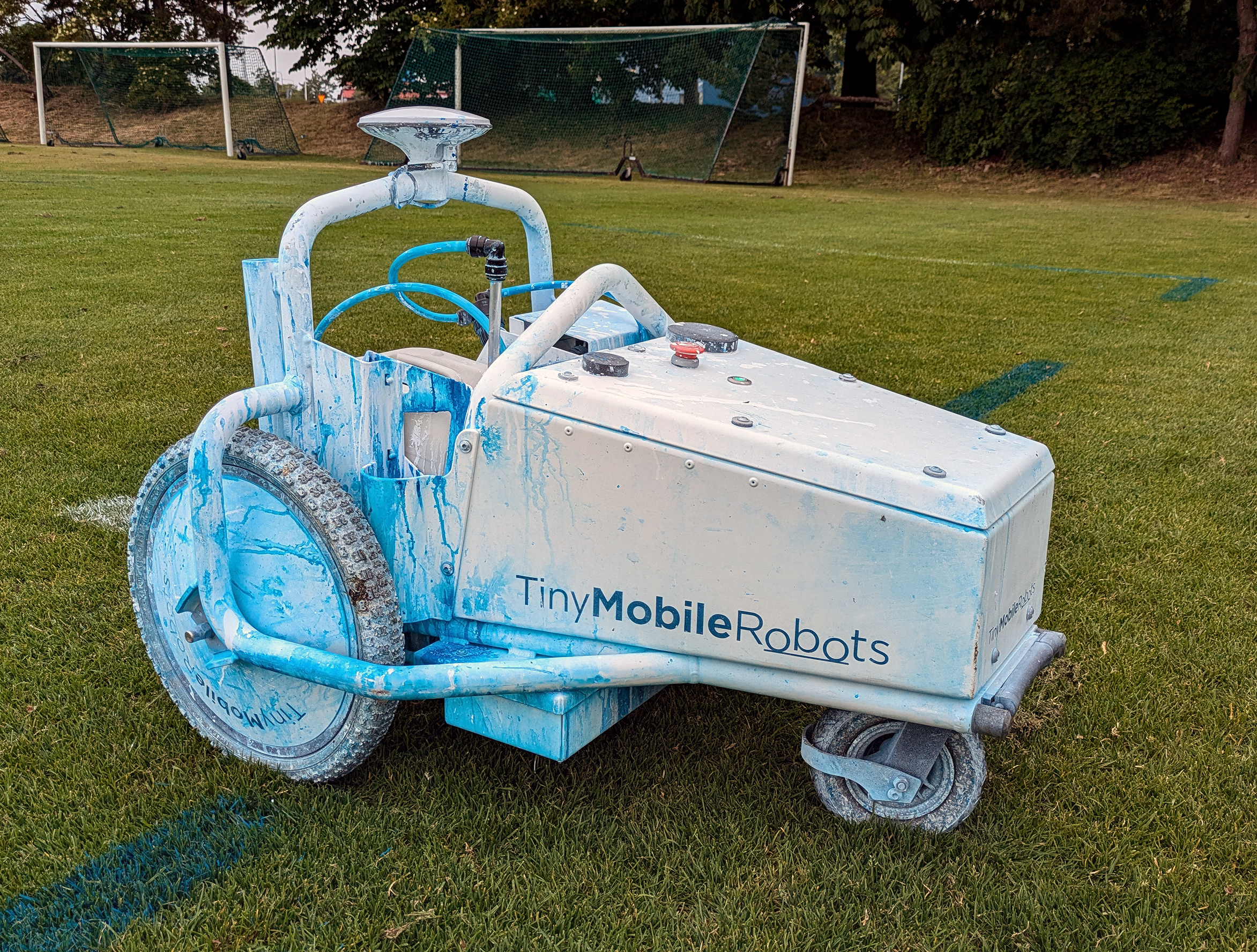
Previously, the lines were chalked by hand with a simple chalk machine, nowadays some fields use a programmable robot is used that draws all the lines on its own with spray paint.

As the Laws were formulated in England, and were initially administered solely by the four British football associations within IFAB, the standard dimensions of a football pitch were originally expressed in imperial units. The Laws now express dimensions with approximate metric equivalents (followed by traditional units in brackets), though use of imperial units remains popular in English-speaking countries with a relatively recent history of metrication (or only partial metrication), such as Britain.

The length of the pitch, or field, for international adult matches is in the range of 100–110 m (110–120 yd) and the width is in the range of 64–75 m (70–80 yd). Fields for non-international matches may be 90–120 m (100–130 yd) in length and 45–90 m (50–100 yd) in width, provided the pitch does not become square. In 2008, the IFAB initially approved a fixed size of 105 m (115 yd) long and 68 m (74 yd) wide as a standard pitch dimension for international matches; however, this decision was later put on hold and was never actually implemented.

The longer boundary lines are touchlines, while the shorter boundaries (on which the goals are placed) are goal lines. A rectangular goal is positioned on each goal line, midway between the two touchlines. The inner edges of the vertical goal posts must be 7.32 m (24 ft) apart, and the lower edge of the horizontal crossbar supported by the goal posts must be 2.44 m (8 ft) above the ground. Nets are usually placed behind the goal, but are not required by the Laws.

In front of the goal is the penalty area. This area is marked by the goal line, two lines starting on the goal line 16.5 m (18 yd) from the goalposts and extending 16.5 m (18 yd) into the pitch perpendicular to the goal line, and a line joining them. This area has a number of functions, the most prominent being to mark where the goalkeeper may handle the ball and where a penalty foul by a member of the defending team becomes punishable by a penalty kick. Other markings define the position of the ball or players at kick-offs, goal kicks, penalty kicks and corner kicks.

=== Duration and tie-breaking methods ===
==== 90-minute ordinary time ====
A standard adult football match consists of two halves of 45 minutes each. Each half runs continuously, meaning that the clock is not stopped when the ball is out of play. There is usually a 15-minute half-time break between halves. The end of the match is known as full-time. The referee is the official timekeeper for the match, and may make an allowance for time lost through substitutions, injured players requiring attention, or other stoppages. This added time is called "additional time" in FIFA documents, but is most commonly referred to as stoppage time or injury time, while lost time can also be used as a synonym. The duration of stoppage time is at the sole discretion of the referee. Stoppage time does not fully compensate for the time in which the ball is out of play, and a 90-minute game typically involves about an hour of "effective playing time".

The referee alone signals the end of the match. In matches where a fourth official is appointed, towards the end of the half, the referee signals how many minutes of stoppage time they intend to add. The fourth official then informs the players and spectators by holding up a board showing this number. The signalled stoppage time may be further extended by the referee. Added time was introduced because of an incident in 1891 during a match between Stoke and Aston Villa. Trailing 1–0 with two minutes remaining, Stoke were awarded a penalty kick. Villa's goalkeeper deliberately kicked the ball far out of play; by the time it was recovered, the clock had run out and the game was over, leaving Stoke unable to attempt the penalty. The same rule also states that the duration of either half is extended until a penalty kick to be taken or retaken is completed; thus, no game can end with an uncompleted penalty.

Due to the relatively high ambient temperatures in some regions, cooling breaks for the players were introduced. Breaks could take place at the referee's discretion after the 30th minute of each half if the wet-bulb globe temperature exceeded 32 °C (90 °F); the breaks would last 3 minutes, with this time made up by an extended period of stoppage time at the end of the half.

==== Tie-breaking ====
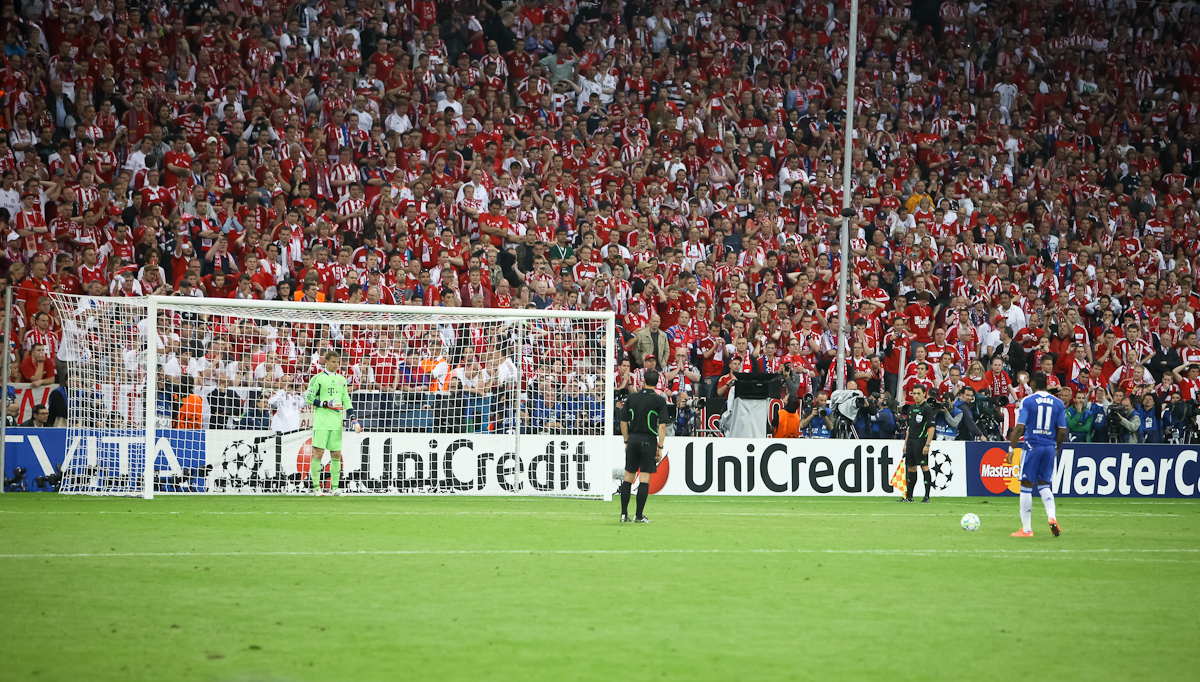
Most knockout competitions use a penalty shoot-out to decide the winner if a match ends as a draw

In league competitions, games may end in a draw. In knockout competitions where a winner is required, various methods may be employed to break such a deadlock; some competitions may invoke replays. A game tied at the end of regulation time may go into extra time, which consists of two further 15-minute periods. If the score is still tied after extra time, some competitions allow the use of penalty shoot-outs (previously known in the Laws of the Game as "kicks from the penalty mark") to determine which team will progress to the next stage of the tournament or be the champion. Goals scored during extra time periods count towards the final score of the game, but kicks from the penalty mark are only used to decide the team that progresses to the next part of the tournament, with goals scored in a penalty shoot-out not making up part of the final score.

In competitions using two-legged matches, each team competes at home once, with an aggregate score from the two matches deciding which team progresses. Where aggregates are equal, the away goals rule may be used to determine the winners, in which case the winner is the team that scored the most goals in the leg they played away from home. If the result is still equal, extra time and potentially a penalty shoot-out are required.

=== Ball in and out of play ===
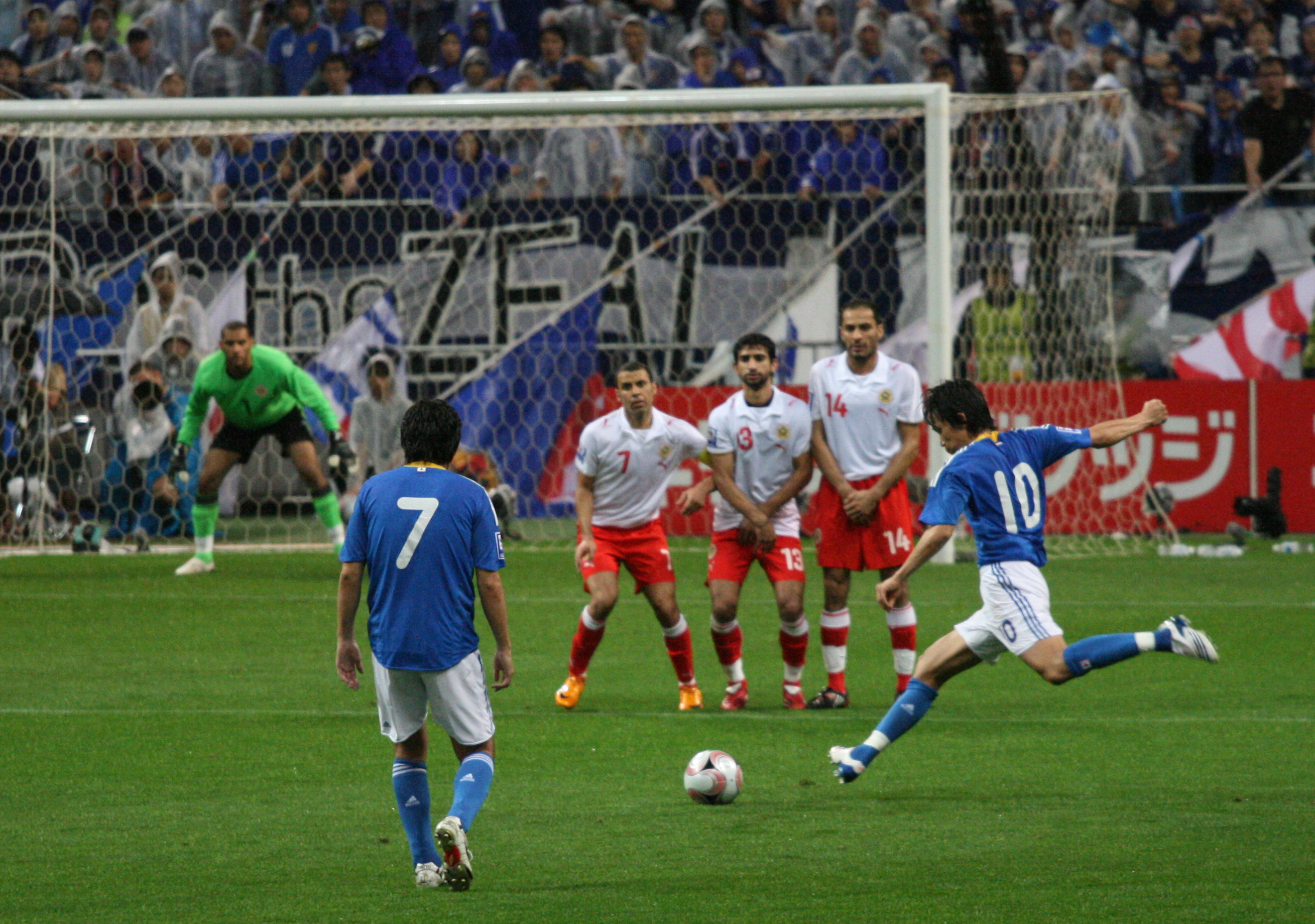
A player takes a free kick, while the opposition form a "wall" to try to block the ball

Under the Laws, the two basic states of play during a game are ball in play and ball out of play. From the beginning of each playing period with a kick-off until the end of the playing period, the ball is in play at all times, except when either the ball leaves the field of play, or play is stopped by the referee. When the ball becomes out of play, play is restarted by one of eight restart methods depending on how it went out of play:

- Kick-off: following a goal by the opposing team, or to begin each period of play.
- Throw-in: when the ball has crossed the touchline; awarded to the opposing team to that which last touched the ball.
- Goal kick: when the ball has wholly crossed the goal line without a goal having been scored and having last been touched by a player of the attacking team; awarded to defending team.
- Corner kick: when the ball has wholly crossed the goal line without a goal having been scored and having last been touched by a player of the defending team; awarded to attacking team.
- Indirect free kick: awarded to the opposing team following "non-penal" fouls, certain technical infringements, or when play is stopped to caution or dismiss an opponent without a specific foul having occurred. A goal may not be scored directly (without the ball first touching another player) from an indirect free kick.
- Direct free kick: awarded to fouled team following certain listed "penal" fouls. A goal may be scored directly from a direct free kick.
- Penalty kick: awarded to the fouled team following a foul usually punishable by a direct free kick but that has occurred within their opponent's penalty area.
- Dropped-ball: occurs when the referee has stopped play for any other reason, such as a serious injury to a player, interference by an external party, or a ball becoming defective.

=== Misconduct ===
==== On-field ====
Players are cautioned with a yellow card, and dismissed from the game with a red card. These colours were first introduced at the 1970 FIFA World Cup and used consistently since.

A foul occurs when a player commits an offence listed in the Laws of the Game while the ball is in play. The offences that constitute a foul are listed in Law 12. Handling the ball deliberately, tripping an opponent, or pushing an opponent, are examples of "penal fouls", punishable by a direct free kick or penalty kick depending on where the offence occurred. Other fouls are punishable by an indirect free kick.

The referee may punish a player's or substitute's misconduct by a caution (yellow card) or dismissal (red card). A second yellow card in the same game leads to a red card, which results in a dismissal. A player given a yellow card is said to have been "booked", the referee writing the player's name in their official notebook. If a player has been dismissed, no substitute can be brought on in their place and the player may not participate in further play. Misconduct may occur at any time, and while the offences that constitute misconduct are listed, the definitions are broad. In particular, the offence of "unsporting behaviour" may be used to deal with most events that violate the spirit of the game, even if they are not listed as specific offences. A referee can show a yellow or red card to a player, substitute, substituted player, and to non-players such as managers and support staff.

Rather than stopping play, the referee may allow play to continue if doing so will benefit the team against which an offence has been committed. This is known as "playing an advantage". The referee may "call back" play and penalise the original offence if the anticipated advantage does not ensue within "a few seconds". Even if an offence is not penalised due to advantage being played, the offender may still be sanctioned for misconduct at the next stoppage of play.

The referee's decision in all on-pitch matters is considered final. The score of a match cannot be altered after the game, even if later evidence shows that decisions (including whether a goal was awarded or not) were incorrect.

==== Off-field ====
Along with the general administration of the sport, football associations and competition organisers also enforce good conduct in wider aspects of the game, dealing with issues such as comments to the press, clubs' financial management, doping, age fraud and match fixing. Most competitions enforce mandatory suspensions for players who are sent off in a game. Some on-field incidents, if considered very serious (such as allegations of racial abuse), may result in competitions deciding to impose heavier sanctions than those normally associated with a red card. (Note: For example, the English Premier League fined and levied an eight-match suspension on Luis Suárez for racially abusing Patrice Evra.) Some associations allow for appeals against player suspensions incurred on-field if clubs feel a referee was incorrect or unduly harsh.

Sanctions for such infractions may be levied on individuals or on clubs as a whole. Penalties may include fines, point deductions (in league competitions) or even expulsion from competitions. For example, the English Football League deduct 12 points from any team that enters financial administration. Among other administrative sanctions are penalties against game forfeiture. Teams that forfeit a game or are forfeited against are awarded a technical loss or win.

== Governing bodies ==
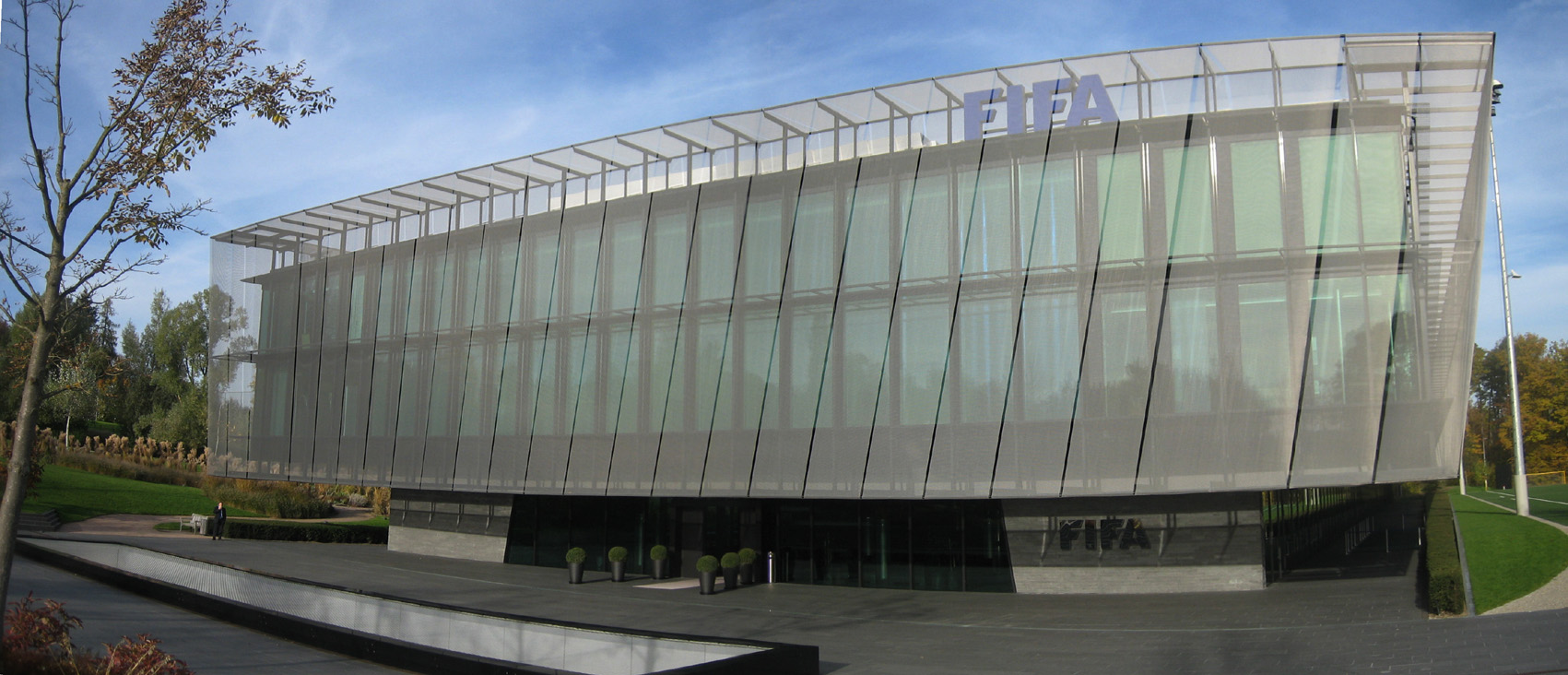
Headquarters of FIFA, the world governing body of football

The recognised international governing body of football (and associated games, such as futsal and beach soccer) is FIFA. The FIFA headquarters are located in Zürich, Switzerland. Six regional confederations are associated with FIFA; these are:

- Asia: Asian Football Confederation (AFC)
- Africa: Confederation of African Football (CAF)
- Europe: Union of European Football Associations (UEFA)
- North/Central America & Caribbean: Confederation of North, Central American and Caribbean Association Football (CONCACAF)
- Oceania: Oceania Football Confederation (OFC)
- South America: Confederación Sudamericana de Fútbol (South American Football Confederation; CONMEBOL)

National associations (or national federations) oversee football within individual countries. 211 national associations are affiliated both with FIFA and with their respective continental confederations. Other national associations may be members of continental confederations but otherwise not participate in FIFA competitions.

While FIFA is responsible for organising international competitions and enforcing most international regulations, the Laws of the Game are set by the IFAB, where each of the four UK associations holds one vote and FIFA collectively holds four votes.

== International competitions ==
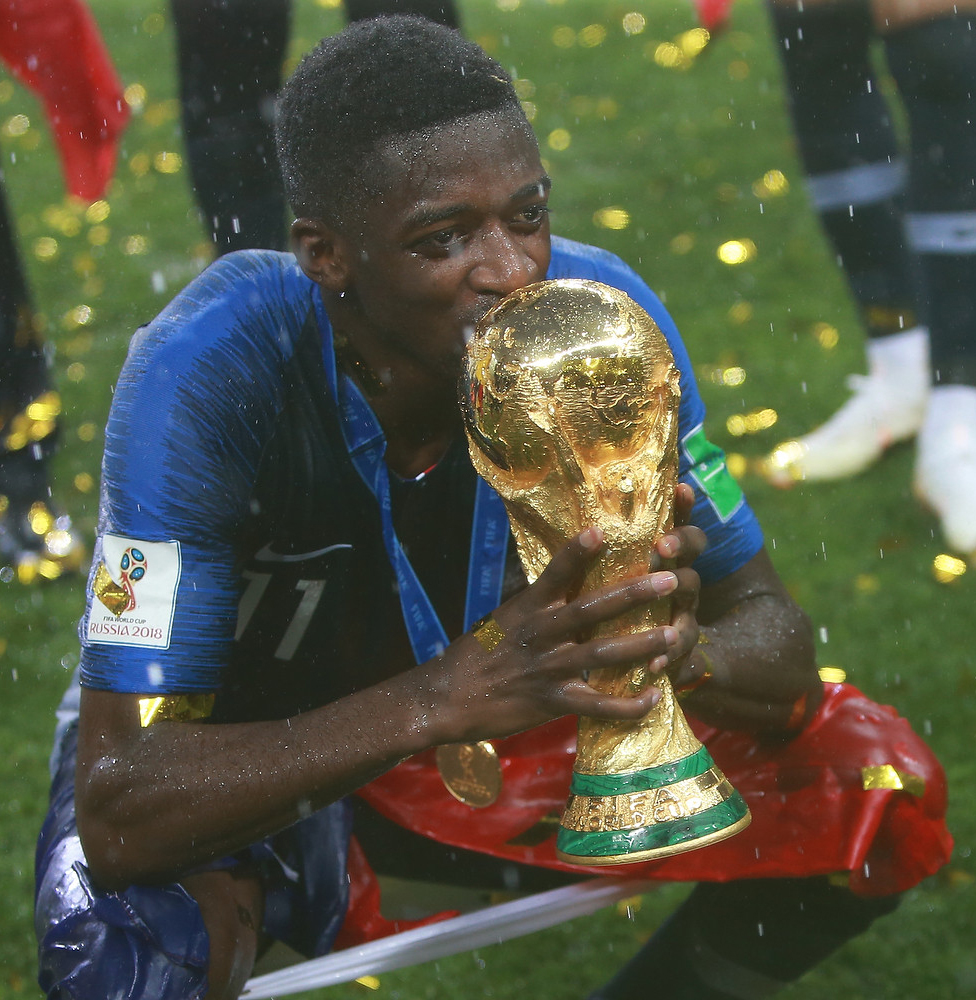
The FIFA World Cup is the largest international competition in football and the world's most viewed sporting event

International competitions in association football principally consist of two varieties: competitions involving representative national teams or those involving clubs based in multiple nations and national leagues. International football, without qualification, most often refers to the former. In the case of international club competition, it is the country of origin of the clubs involved, not the nationalities of their players, that renders the competition international in nature.

The major international competition in football and the most prestigious is the World Cup, organised by FIFA. This competition has taken place every four years since 1930, with the exception of the 1942 and 1946 tournaments, which were cancelled because of World War II. As of 2022, over 200 national teams compete in qualifying tournaments within the scope of continental confederations for a place in the finals. The finals tournament involved 32 national teams (expanded to 48 teams for the 2026 tournament) competing over a four-week period. (Note: The number of competing teams has varied over the history of the competition.) The World Cup is the world's most widely viewed and most followed sporting event, with the 2022 tournament estimated to be watched by 5 billion people, more than 60% of the global population. The 1958 World Cup saw the emergence of Pelé as a global sporting star, a period that coincided with "the explosive spread of television, which massively amplified his presence everywhere". The current champions are Spain, who won their second title at the 2026 tournament in the United States. The FIFA Women's World Cup has been held every four years since 1991. Under the tournament's current format that was expanded in 2023, national teams vie for 31 slots in a three-year qualification phase, while the host nation's team enters automatically as the 32nd slot. The current champions are Spain, after winning their first title in the 2023 tournament.

There has been a football tournament at every Summer Olympic Games since 1900, except at the 1932 games in Los Angeles when FIFA and the International Olympic Committee (IOC) had disagreed over the status of amateur players. Before the inception of the World Cup, the Olympics (especially during the 1920s) were the most prestigious international event. Originally, the tournament was for amateurs only. As professionalism spread around the world, the gap in quality between the World Cup and the Olympics widened. The countries that benefited most were the Soviet Bloc countries of Eastern Europe, where top athletes were state-sponsored while retaining their status as amateurs. Between 1948 and 1980, 23 out of 27 Olympic medals were won by Eastern Europe, with only Sweden (gold in 1948 and bronze in 1952), Denmark (bronze in 1948 and silver in 1960) and Japan (bronze in 1968) breaking their dominance. For the 1984 Los Angeles Games, the IOC allowed professional players to compete. Since 1992, male competitors must be under 23 years old, although since 1996, three players over the age of 23 have been allowed per squad. A women's tournament was added in 1996; in contrast to the men's event, full international sides without age restrictions play the women's Olympic tournament.

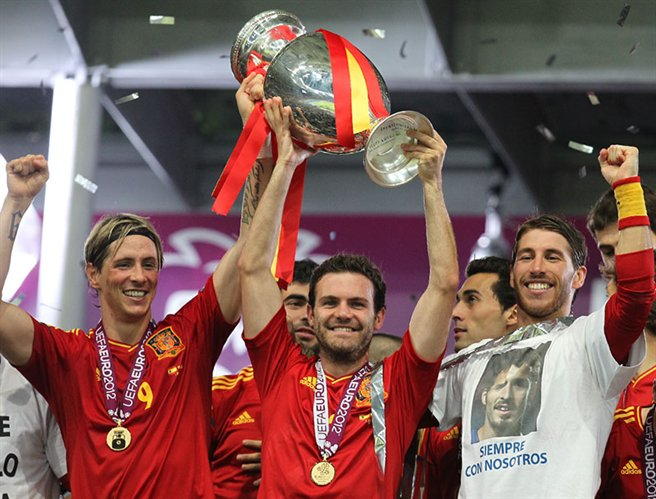
Spanish footballers Fernando Torres, Juan Mata, and Sergio Ramos celebrating winning the UEFA European Championship in 2012

After the World Cup, the most important international football competitions are the continental championships, which are organised by each continental confederation and contested between national teams. These are the European Championship (UEFA), the Copa América (CONMEBOL), the Africa Cup of Nations (CAF), the Asian Cup (AFC), the Gold Cup (CONCACAF) and the Nations Cup (OFC). These competitions are not strictly limited to members of the continental confederations, with guest teams from other continents sometimes invited to compete. The FIFA Confederations Cup was contested by the winners of all six continental championships, the current FIFA World Cup champions, and the country which was hosting the next World Cup. This was generally regarded as a warm-up tournament for the upcoming FIFA World Cup and did not carry the same prestige as the World Cup itself. The tournament was discontinued following the 2017 edition, with its calendar slot replaced by an expanded FIFA Club World Cup. The Finalissima was revived in 2022, and is contested between the Copa América and European Championship winners. The UEFA Nations League and the CONCACAF Nations League were introduced in the late 2010s to replace international friendlies during the two-year cycle between major tournaments.

The most prestigious competitions in club football are the respective continental championships, which are generally contested between national champions, for example, the UEFA Champions League in Europe and the Copa Libertadores in South America. The winners of each continental competition contest the FIFA Intercontinental Cup, held annually, and the FIFA Club World Cup, held once every four years.

== Domestic competitions ==
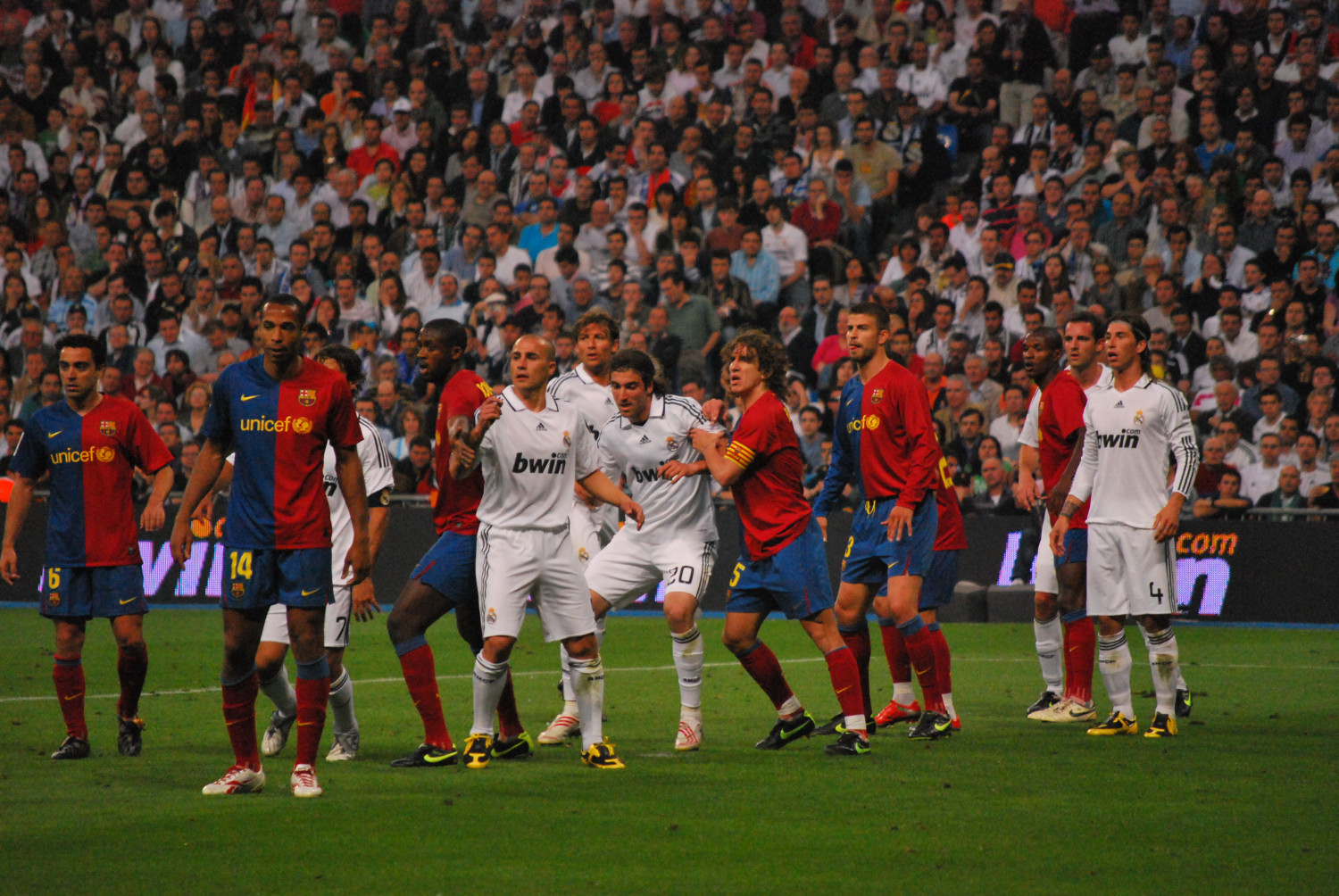
A 2009 Spanish La Liga match between Real Madrid and Barcelona. The fixture, known as El Clásico, is one of the most renowned in sport.

In each country, football clubs are usually federated in associations or leagues that organise official tournaments among themselves, from which the champion of each country and the teams that will participate in international club tournaments emerge. There is no single system of competitions, and each national league organises them according to its own traditions.

The governing bodies in each country operate league systems in a domestic season, normally comprising several divisions, in which the teams gain points throughout the season depending on results, usually three points for a win, one for a draw and zero for a defeat. Teams are put into tables, placed in order according to points accrued. In the Old World (Africa, Asia and Europe), it is common for each team to play every other team in its league at home and away in each season, in a round-robin tournament. At the end of a season, which typically runs from August to May, the top team is declared the champion. The top few teams may be promoted to a higher division, and one or more of the teams finishing at the bottom are relegated to a lower division.

Some exceptions to this system occur in the New World (Americas) and Australia:

- The majority of the Latin American leagues (including Liga MX from Mexico and Liga Profesional de Fútbol from Argentina) divide football championships into two sections named Apertura and Clausura (Spanish for Opening and Closing), awarding a champion for each. After a first phase using points in a round-robin tournament, these leagues usually have a knockout phase, with a final deciding the champion of each Apertura and Clausura tournament. In some countries, such as Uruguay, the winners of the Apertura and Clausura play each other in a play-off for the season title.
- The Brazilian Série A ("Brasileirão") uses a single-season double round-robin format to determine the champion, similar to most European leagues, although it is played from April or May to December. Brazilian clubs also participate in state leagues from January to April, and at least one state league, the Campeonato Carioca in Rio de Janeiro, had a split season format until 2020. However, Brazil has never used an Apertura and Clausura system in its national tournament, instead employing various formats with play-offs until 2002.
- Major League Soccer in the United States and Canada uses a closed league system (without promotion and relegation) and a conference system, similar to that used in other sports leagues in both countries. In each conference, clubs play a round-robin schedule during the regular season, and those with the most points qualify for the play-offs, which conclude with a final to determine the champion.
- The A-League in Australia also uses a closed league system. At the end of a regular season played in a round-robin format, the clubs with the most points compete in play-offs to determine the league champion.

The teams finishing at the top of a country's league may also be eligible to play in international club competitions in the following season. Most countries supplement the league system with one or more "cup" competitions organised on a knock-out basis. These include the domestic cup, which may be open to all eligible teams in a country's league system—both professional and amateur—and is organised by the national federation.

Some countries' top divisions feature highly-paid star players; in smaller countries, lower divisions, and many women's clubs, players may be part-timers with a second job, or amateurs. The top five European leagues – Premier League (England), Bundesliga (Germany), La Liga (Spain), Serie A (Italy), and Ligue 1 (France) – attract most of the world's best players and, during the 2006–07 season, each of these leagues had a total wage cost in excess of €600 million. These leagues also generated a combined €17.2 billion in revenue in the 2021–22 season from television contracts, matchday tickets, sponsorships, and other sources. In the 2022–23 season, clubs in Europe's "big five" leagues had an aggregate wage cost of €13 billion, with each league spending more than €1.8 billion in wages. In contrast, the combined revenue of these leagues was €19.6 billion.

== Variants and casual play ==
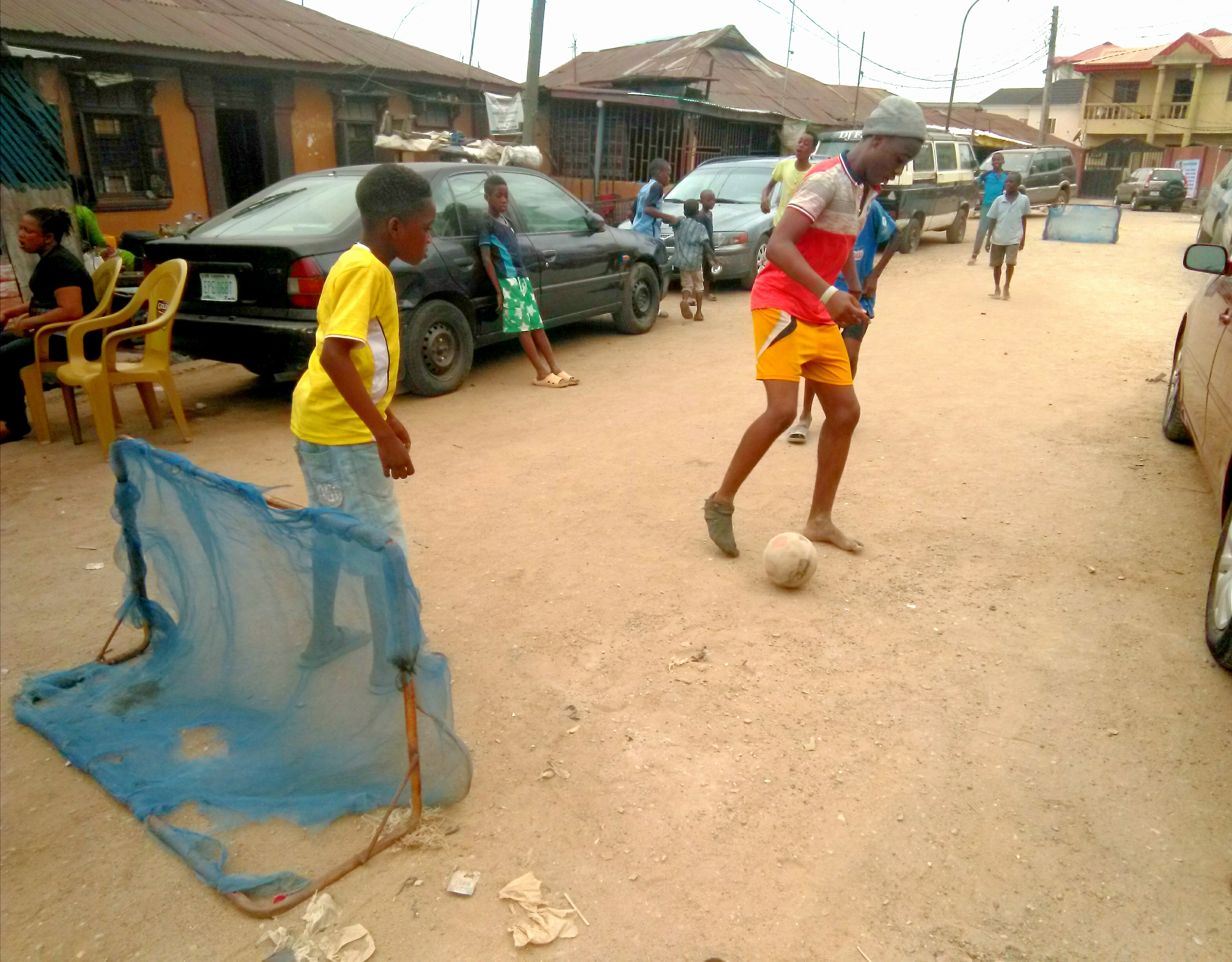
Street play in Lagos, Nigeria

Improvised ball

Variants of association football have been codified for teams of reduced size, such as five-a-side football; for non-traditional playing environments, including beach soccer, futsal and indoor soccer; and for athletes with disabilities (Paralympic football).

Street football can be played with only minimal equipment – a basic game can be played on almost any open area of reasonable size with just a ball made from almost any material and items to mark the positions of the goalposts. Such informal games can have team sizes that vary from eleven-a-side, can use a limited or modified subset of the official rules, and can be self-officiated by the players.

== See also ==
- Outline of association football
- Lists of association football clubs
- List of association football films
- List of association football video games
