= Domestic association football season =

Period when association football is played

The domestic association football season in countries that association football is played around the world varies in length and time of year contested. Most employ a single period in which the main league competition is contested alongside any cup competitions, although many Latin American leagues have two competitions contested in one season under the Apertura and Clausura system.

As a rule, the period of the domestic football season is ultimately dictated by the weather, with most football games played on natural grass pitches which are vulnerable to freezing or becoming water-logged, although advances in artificial turf and pitch drainage/heating systems have improved pitch availability in many leagues.

In countries where association football competes with other football codes that are locally more popular, the season cycle can also be dictated by the scheduling of competing codes. Major League Soccer (MLS), which began in the United States and has since expanded into Canada, has had to compete with American football from its inception, and now competes with Canadian football as well. When MLS began, most of its teams had to play in large American football stadiums that were used by teams in the National Football League (NFL) or college football. This led to scheduling the season to begin in spring and end in fall (autumn), which put the bulk of the season outside that of American football. Stadium conflict has now been reduced with the advent of soccer-specific stadiums. In Australia, the two most popular football codes are Australian rules football and rugby league, both of which are traditionally played in the Southern Hemisphere winter. Because all of the stadiums used by the A-League are also used for one or both of these two codes, that league chose to operate on a spring-to-autumn cycle, which placed most of its season outside those of Australian rules and rugby league.

The domestic season is preceded by a pre-season, in which clubs will require players to report back to the club by a set date to begin pre-season training, and will arrange pre-season friendly games toward the start of the season to improve fitness and test team formations and tactics, particularly if new playing staff have joined a club.

In many leagues, the dates of the domestic season dictate the opening and closing of a transfer window, the periods when players can be transferred.

The timing of a domestic season must be coordinated with international football competitions, which can see national teams with different domestic seasons playing each other at different times in their domestic season, although this can be less significant for certain countries where their best players, and hence the bulk of their national team, do not play in their international team's domestic league programme.

The world football governing body, FIFA, which governs club as well as national football, mandates an international football calendar, whereby certain weeks in the year are reserved for national friendly and competitive matches, as well as regional club competitions. For dates which fall within a country's domestic season, league clubs are required to release any called up player for their international team a set number of days before a fixture. The date of the worldwide national team competition the FIFA World Cup is always in June/July, with the exception of the 2022 Qatar edition which was played in November/December.

== League seasons ==
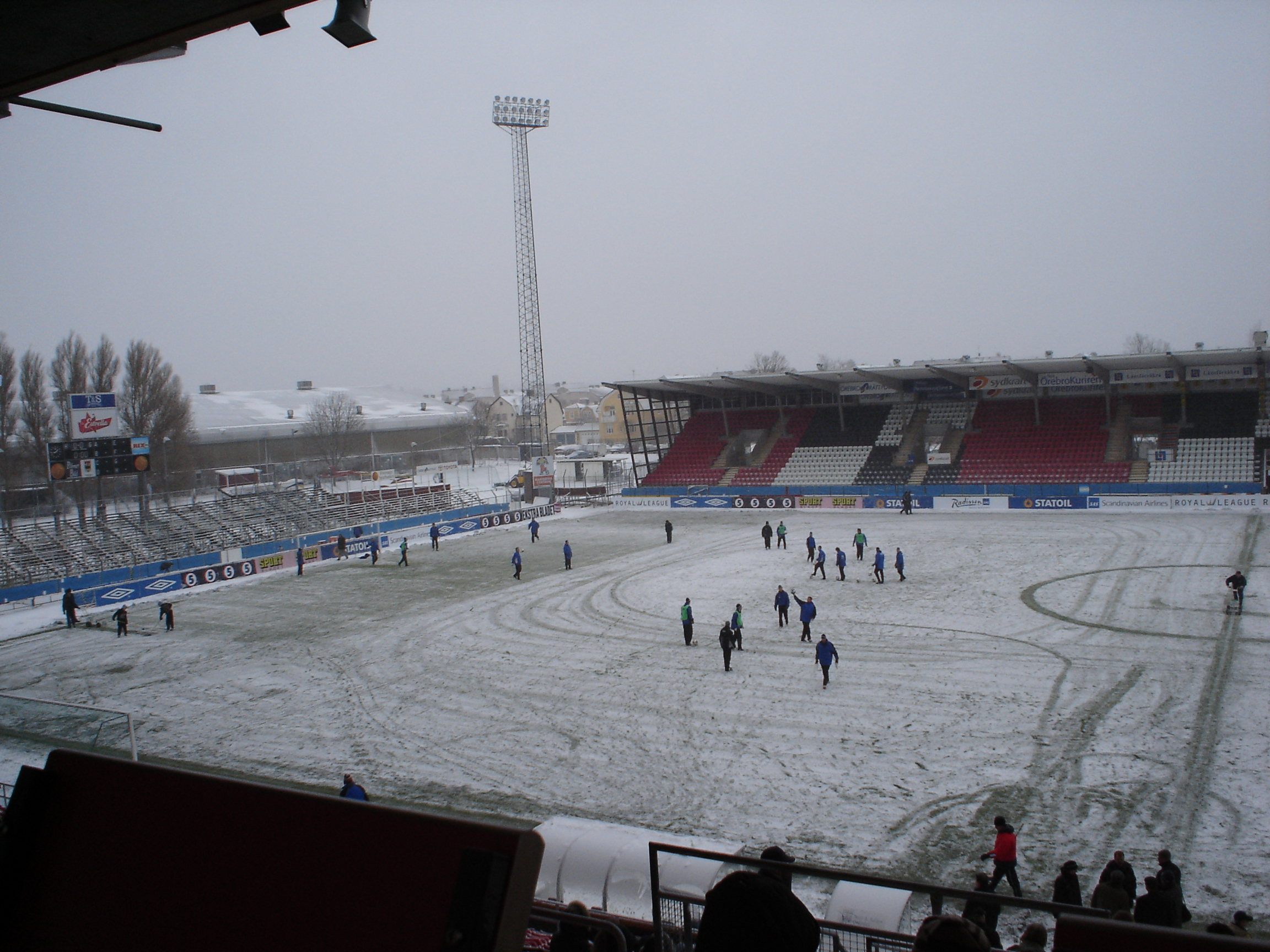
In colder climates, like in Sweden, the season is restricted by weather conditions.

=== Europe ===
When not specified, winter breaks are around the Christmas and New Year weeks.

- A Lyga (Lithuania): late February - early November
- (Austria) Austrian Bundesliga: regular season mid-to-late July - mid-March (with a winter break from mid-December to mid-February), playoffs late March - mid-to-late May
- (Belgium) Belgian Pro League: mid-July – mid-March, with playoffs from April to May (winter break of one month)
- (Croatia) Croatian First Football League: late July – late May (winter break of one month)
- (Denmark) Danish Superliga: late-July – late May, concluding in playoffs (winter break of 2.5 months)
- Premier League (England): mid-August – mid-May
- Veikkausliiga (Finland): April – October
- Ligue 1 (France): early August – late May (previously, mid-July to early June with a two month-long winter break)
- Bundesliga (Germany): mid-August – mid-May (winter break of one month)
- Super League Greece: mid-August – mid-May
- (Republic of Ireland) League of Ireland: late February – late October
- (Israel) Israeli Premier League: late-August - late May
- Serie A (Italy): late August – late May
- Eredivisie (Netherlands): early August – late April or early May, before six playoff days
- Eliteserien (Norway): March – November
- Ekstraklasa (Poland): July - May
- Primeira Liga (Portugal): late August – mid-May
- Liga I (Romania): mid-July – early March, with playoffs from April to May (winter break of one month)
- (Russia) Russian Premier League: Transition to a mid-July–mid-May season completed in 2012; winter break from early December to early March instituted in 2012–13. Previously mid-March–early December.
- (Scotland) Scottish Premiership: mid-August – mid-May (winter break of one month)
- La Liga (Spain): late August – late May (break for Christmas and New Year)
- Swiss Super League (Switzerland): late July – mid-May (winter break of two months)
- Allsvenskan (Sweden): March-Early April – late October-early November. Summer breaks until 1997. Playoffs in late October-early November between 1982 and 1992.
- Süper Lig (Turkey): late August – mid-May (winter break of one month)
- (Ukraine) Ukrainian Premier League: mid-July – late May (winter break from mid-December to late February)
- Cymru Premier (Wales/England): mid-August – mid-May

=== Africa ===
- (Egypt) Egyptian Premier League: September – June
- (Ethiopia) Ethiopian Premier League: September – July
- (Kenya) Kenyan Premier League: September - May
- (Libya) Libyan Premier League: October – June
- (Nigeria) Nigerian Premier League: September – June
- Rwanda National Football League: September – May
- (South Africa) South African Premiership: August – May

=== Americas ===
- Primera División (Argentina): early August – late May
  - The country abandoned its long-standing Apertura and Clausura format, with the Apertura from August–December and Clausura from February–June, over a transitional period that spanned 2015 and 2016.
- Campeonato Brasileiro Série A (Brazil): early May – early December
- (Canada) Canadian Premier League: early April – late October
- (Ecuador) Ecuadorian Serie A: mid-February – early December (2022: mid November)
- National Premier League (Jamaica): September – May
- Liga MX (Mexico): split into half-seasons:
  - Apertura: late August – mid-December
  - Clausura: early January – early May
- Liga 1 (Peru): early February – November
- TT Pro League (Trinidad and Tobago): August – May
- Major League Soccer (United States/Canada): early March – early November (Changing to mid July - late May with a midseason winter break for the 2027-28 season)
- (Uruguay) Uruguayan Primera División: early February – mid November or early December (varies year to year; 2022: mid November)

=== Asia ===
- A-League (Australia/New Zealand) October – May
- Bangladesh Premier League September – May
- (China) Chinese Super League March/April – late October
- Hong Kong Premier League September – May
- Indian Super League (India) October –April
- Liga 1 (Indonesia) August - May
- Persian Gulf Pro League (Iran) July – May
- J1 League (Japan) late February – early December
- (South Korea) K League 1 (Korea Republic) March – November
- Lao Premier League (Laos) August – March
- Malaysia Super League August– May
- United Football League (Philippines) January – June
- Saudi Professional League (Saudi Arabia) August – May
- S.League (Singapore) August - May
- Thai Premier League (Thailand) September – May
- V.League 1 (Vietnam) August/September – May/June

== See also ==
- List of association football subregional confederations
- List of association football competitions
