= Women's association football =

Association football played by women

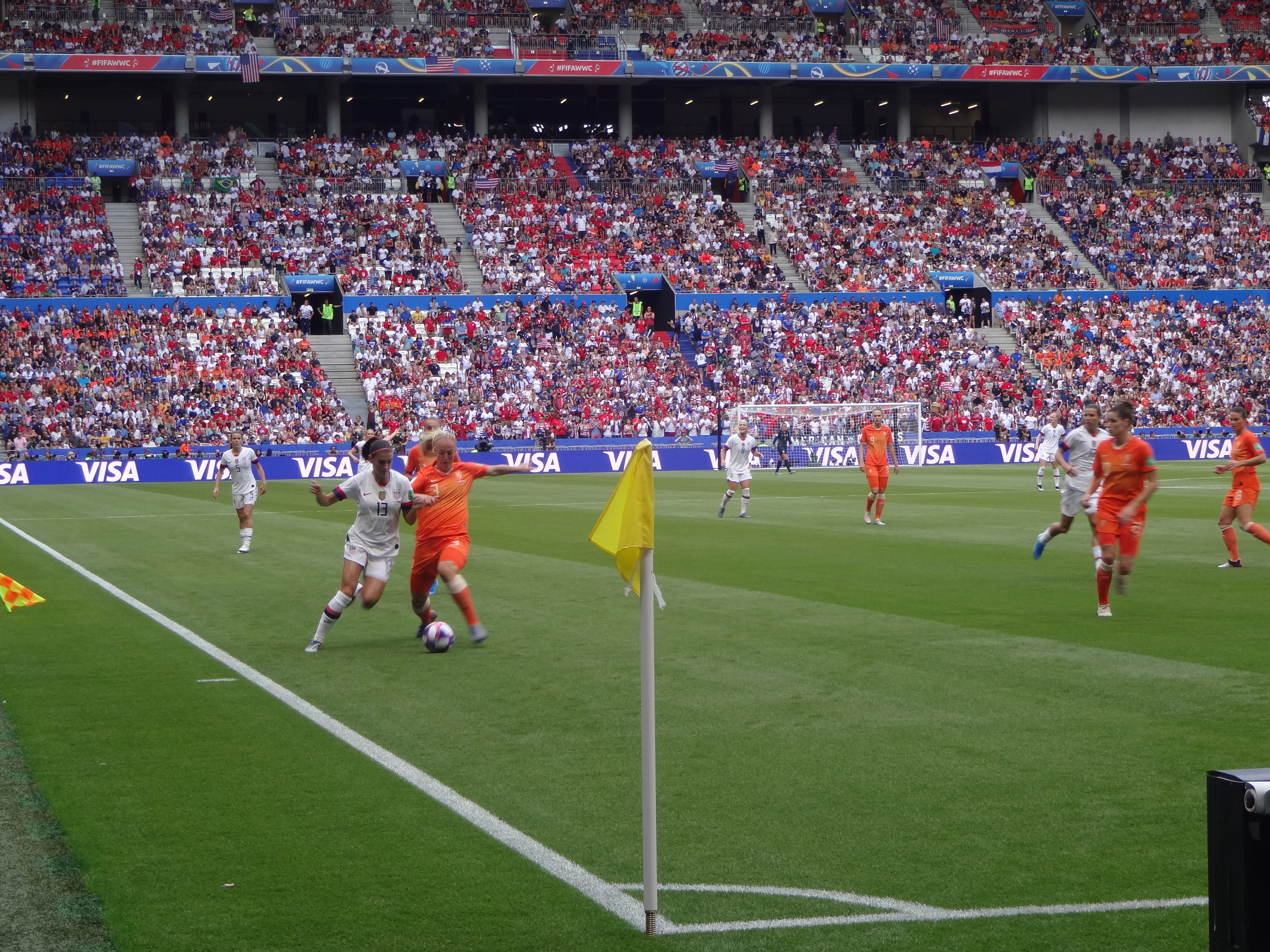
- Alex Morgan and Stefanie van der Gragt battle for the ball during the 2019 FIFA Women's World Cup final in Lyon, France
- Highest governing body: FIFA
- Nicknames: The Women's Game, WoSo (Note: From Women's Soccer.)
- First played: 1880s, Great Britain

Characteristics
- Contact: Yes
- Team members: 11 per side (including goalkeeper)
- Mixed-sex: No, separate competitions
- Type: Team sport, ball game
- Equipment: Football (or soccer ball), football boots, shin guards, kits, and gloves (for goalkeepers)
- Venue: Football pitch (football field, football ground, soccer field, soccer ground or "pitch")
- Glossary: Glossary of association football

Presence
- Country or region: Worldwide
- Olympic: Since 1996
- Paralympic: No

Women's association football, more commonly known as women's football or women's soccer, (Note: For further information, see names for association football.) is the team sport of association football played by women. It is played at the professional level in multiple countries, and about 200 national teams participate internationally. The same rules, known as the Laws of the Game, are used for both women's and men's football. The United States is the most successful nation in women's football, having won 4 Women's World Cups and 5 Olympic gold medals. The second most successful nation in women's football is Germany, with 2 Women's World Cups and 1 Olympic gold medal.

After the "first golden age" of women's football occurred in the United Kingdom in the 1920s, with one match attracting over 50,000 spectators, the Football Association instituted a ban from 1921 to 1970 in England that disallowed women's football on the grounds used by its member clubs. In many other nations, female footballers faced similarly hostile treatment and bans by male-dominated organisations.

In the 1970s, international women's football tournaments were extremely popular, and the oldest surviving continental championship was founded, the AFC Women's Asian Cup. However, a woman did not speak at the FIFA Congress until 1986 (Ellen Wille). The FIFA Women's World Cup was first held in China in 1991 and has since become a major television event in many countries.

== History ==
Women may have been playing football for as long as the game has existed. Evidence shows that a similar game (cuju, also known as tsu chu) was played by women during the Han dynasty (25–220 CE), as female figures are depicted in frescoes of the period playing tsu chu. Annual matches being played in Midlothian, Scotland, are reported as early as the 1790s.

In 1863, football governing bodies introduced standardised rules to prohibit violence on the pitch, so the sport was considered safe for women to play. The first match of an international character took place in 1881 at Hibernian Park in Edinburgh, part of a tour by Scotland and England teams. The Scottish Football Association recorded a women's match in 1892.

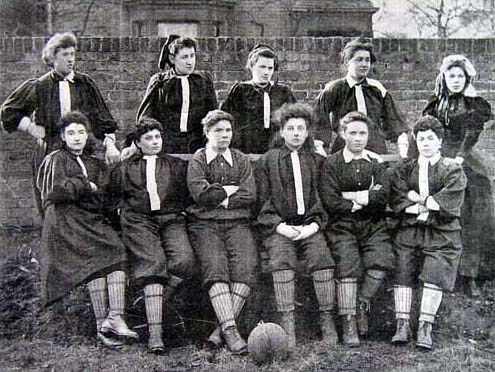
North team of the British Ladies' Football Club, 1895

The British Ladies' Football Club was founded by activist Nettie Honeyball in England in 1894. They played the first women's match officially recorded in England in March 1895. Honeyball is quoted as saying, "I founded the association late last year [1894], with the fixed resolve of proving to the world that women are not the 'ornamental and useless' creatures men have pictured. I must confess, my convictions on all matters where the sexes are so widely divided are all on the side of emancipation, and I look forward to the time when ladies may sit in Parliament and have a voice in the direction of affairs, especially those which concern them most". Honeyball and those like her paved the way for women's football. However, the women's game was frowned upon by the British football associations, and continued without their support. It has been suggested that this was motivated by a perceived threat to the "masculinity" of the game.

=== The Munitionettes' Cup ===
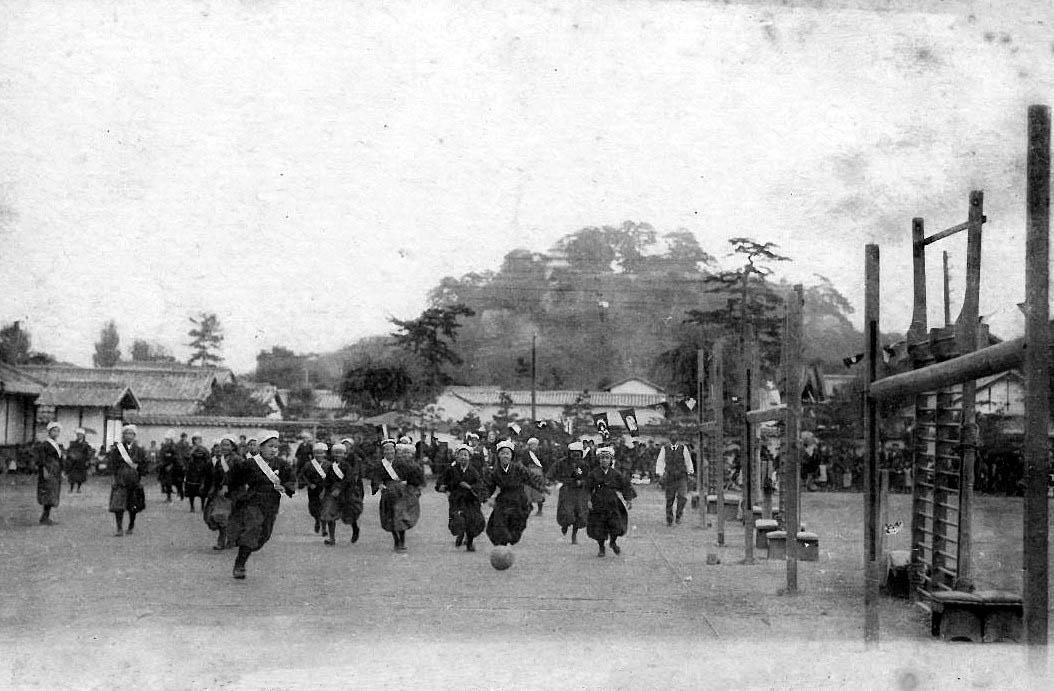
Japanese high-school girls playing football in their traditional hakama with one team wearing sashes (c. 1920)

In August 1917, a tournament was launched for female munition workers' teams in north-east England. Officially titled the "Tyne Wear & Tees Alfred Wood Munition Girls Cup", it was also known as "The Munitionettes' Cup". The first winners of the trophy were Blyth Spartans, who defeated Bolckow Vaughan 5–0 in a replayed final tie at Middlesbrough on 18 May 1918 in front of a crowd of 22,000. The tournament ran for a second year in season 1918–19, the winners being the ladies of Palmer's shipyard in Jarrow, who defeated Christopher Brown's of Hartlepool 1–0 at St James' Park in Newcastle on 22 March 1919.

At the time of the First World War, female employment in heavy industry spurred the growth of the game, much as it had done for men fifty years earlier. A team from England played a team from Ireland on Boxing Day 1917 in front of a crowd of 20,000 spectators. The Irish side of this match was dramatised in the play Rough Girls in 2021. Dick, Kerr Ladies F.C. of Preston, England played in one of the first women's international matches against a French XI team in 1920, and also made up most of the England team against a Scottish Ladies XI in the same year, winning 22–0.

=== FA ban (1921–1970) ===
Despite being more popular than some men's football events (one match saw a 53,000 strong crowd), women's football in England was halted in December 1921 when the Football Association outlawed the playing of the game on association members' pitches, the FA stating that "the game of football is quite unsuitable for females and ought not to be encouraged."

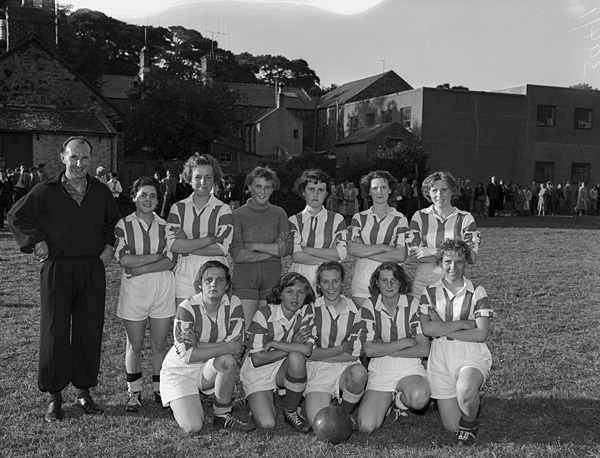
A Welsh women's football team pose for a photograph in 1959

Players and football writers have argued that this ban was due to envy of the large crowds that women's matches attracted, and because the FA had no control over the money made from the women's game. Dick, Kerr Ladies player Alice Barlow said, "we could only put it down to jealousy. We were more popular than the men and our bigger gates were for charity".

Despite the ban, some women's teams continued to play. The Northern Rugby Union did not follow the FA ban, so the short-lived English Ladies Football Association (1921–1922) played some of its matches at rugby grounds.

In other countries, women's football was further debilitated by nationwide bans which often resembled the English FA's measures. The German Football Association banned women's football from 1955 until 1970. Women's football was also banned in France from 1941 to 1970. In Brazil, the Vargas regime and the military dictatorship legally prohibited women and girls from playing football from 1941 to 1979.

=== Tournaments ===
The English Ladies' Football Association Challenge Cup

Following the FA ban on women's teams on 5 December 1921, the English Ladies' Football Association was formed, with 58 affiliated clubs. A silver cup was donated by the first president of the association, Len Bridgett. A total of 23 teams entered the first competition in the spring of 1922. The winners were Stoke Ladies who beat Doncaster and Bentley Ladies 3–1 on 24 June 1922.

The Championship of Great Britain and the World

In 1937, the Dick, Kerr Ladies F.C., who had lost to Scotland's Rutherglen Ladies in 1923 but continued to be proclaimed as "world champions", played the Edinburgh City Girls in the "Championship of Great Britain and the World". Dick, Kerr won the competition with a 5–1 scoreline. The 1939 competition was a more organised affair and the Edinburgh City Girls beat Dick, Kerr 5–2 in Edinburgh, following this up with a 7–1 demolition of Glasgow Ladies in Falkirk to take the title.

=== The revival of the women's game ===
The English Women's FA was formed in 1969 as a result of the increased interest generated by the 1966 World Cup.

The ban in England was maintained by the FA for nearly fifty years, until January 1970. The next year, UEFA recommended that the national associations in each country should manage the women's game. In 2002, Lily Parr of Dick Kerr's Ladies was the first woman to be inducted into the National Football Museum Hall of Fame. She was later honoured with a statue in front of the museum. It was not until 2008 (87 years later), that the FA issued an apology for banning women from the game of football.

=== Women's World Championships, 1970 and 1971 ===
In 1970, the Torino-based Federation of Independent European Female Football (FIEFF) ran the 1970 Women's World Cup in Italy, supported by the Martini & Rossi strong wine manufacturers, and entirely without the involvement of FIFA. This event was at least partly played by clubs and won by Denmark. A second edition, the 1971 Women's World Cup, was hosted by Mexico the following year. The final, also won by Denmark, was played at Estadio Azteca, the largest stadium in North America at the time, in front of crowds estimated at 110,000 or 112,500 attendees.

=== Professionalism ===
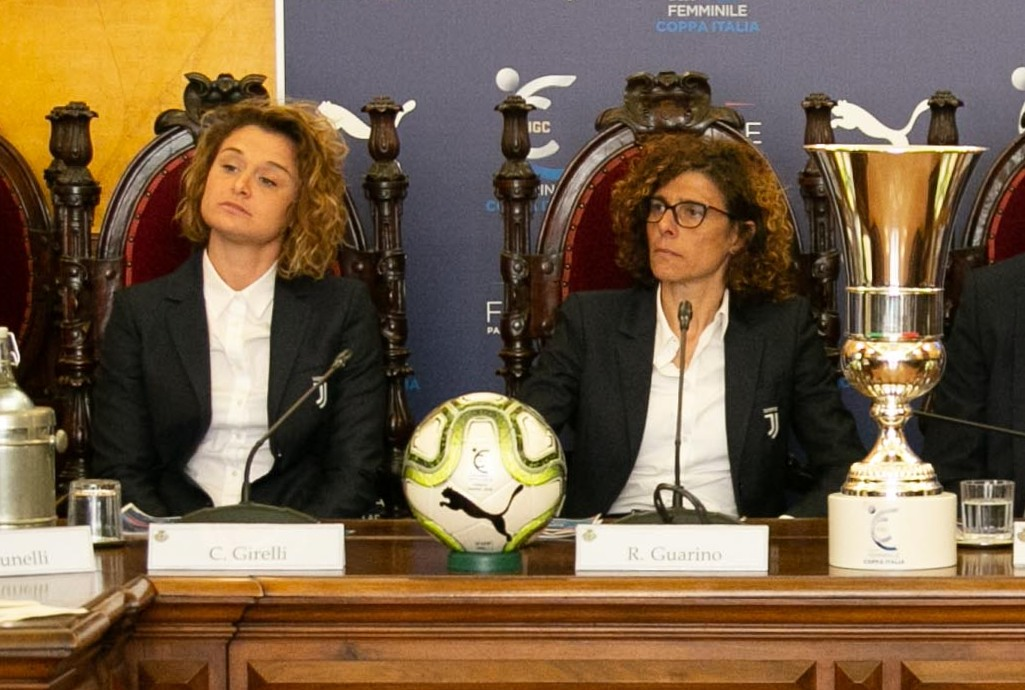
Striker Cristiana Girelli and coach Rita Guarino of Juventus in 2019. Juventus is one of the most storied and successful football clubs in Italy.

During the 1970s, Italy became the first country to have professional women's football players on a part-time basis. Italy was also the first country to import foreign footballers from other European countries, which raised the profile of the league. Players during that era included Susanne Augustesen (Denmark), Rose Reilly and Edna Neillis (Scotland), Anne O'Brien (Ireland) and Concepcion Sánchez Freire (Spain). Sweden was the first to introduce a professional women's domestic league in 1988, the Damallsvenskan.

=== Asia and Oceania ===
In 1989, Japan became the first country to have a semi-professional women's football league, the L. League – still in existence today as Division 1 of the Nadeshiko League. In 2020, Japan established the first-ever women's professional league in Asia, the WE League, which started on fall 2021.

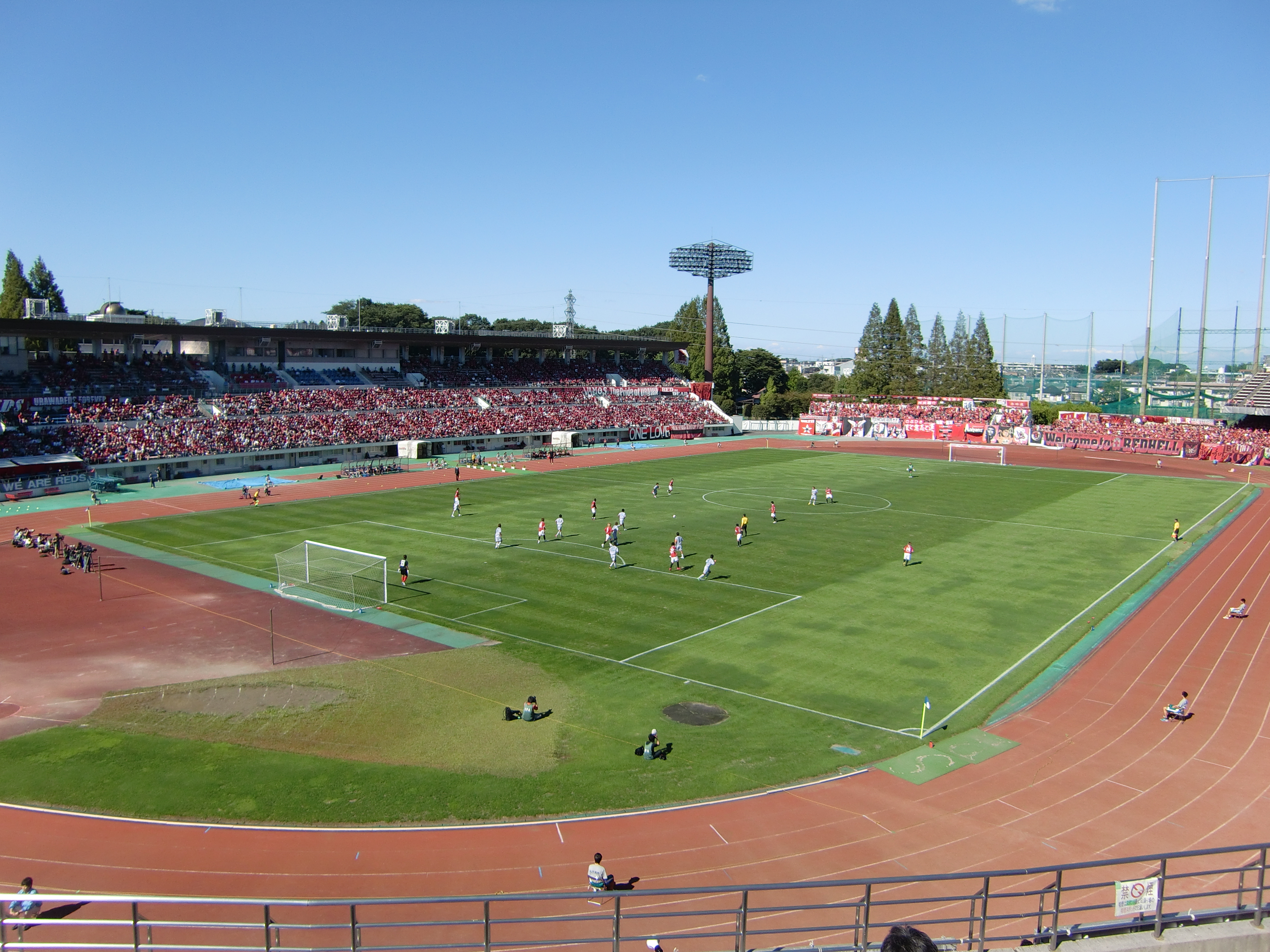
The Urawa Red Diamonds Ladies

In Indonesia, the first recorded "national" women's football event, known as the "Kartini Cup", took place in 1981. The competition was held on an amateur level. Later competitions were also held in an amateur and semi-professional level, including the 1982 appearance of the first women's league, Galanita. The Pertiwi Cup, which drew contestants from throughout all of Indonesia, was first played in 2006. The first professional league was held in 2019 under the name Liga 1 Putri.

In Australia, the W-League, now known as A-League Women, was formed in 2008.

In 2015, the Chinese Women's Super League (CWSL) was launched with an affiliated second division, CWFL. Previously, The Chinese Women's Premier Football League was initiated in 1997 and evolved to the Women's Super League in 2004. From 2011 to 2014, the league was named the Women's National Football League.

The Indian Women's League was launched in 2016. The country has held the top-tier tournament, Indian Women's Football Championship, since 1991.

=== North America ===
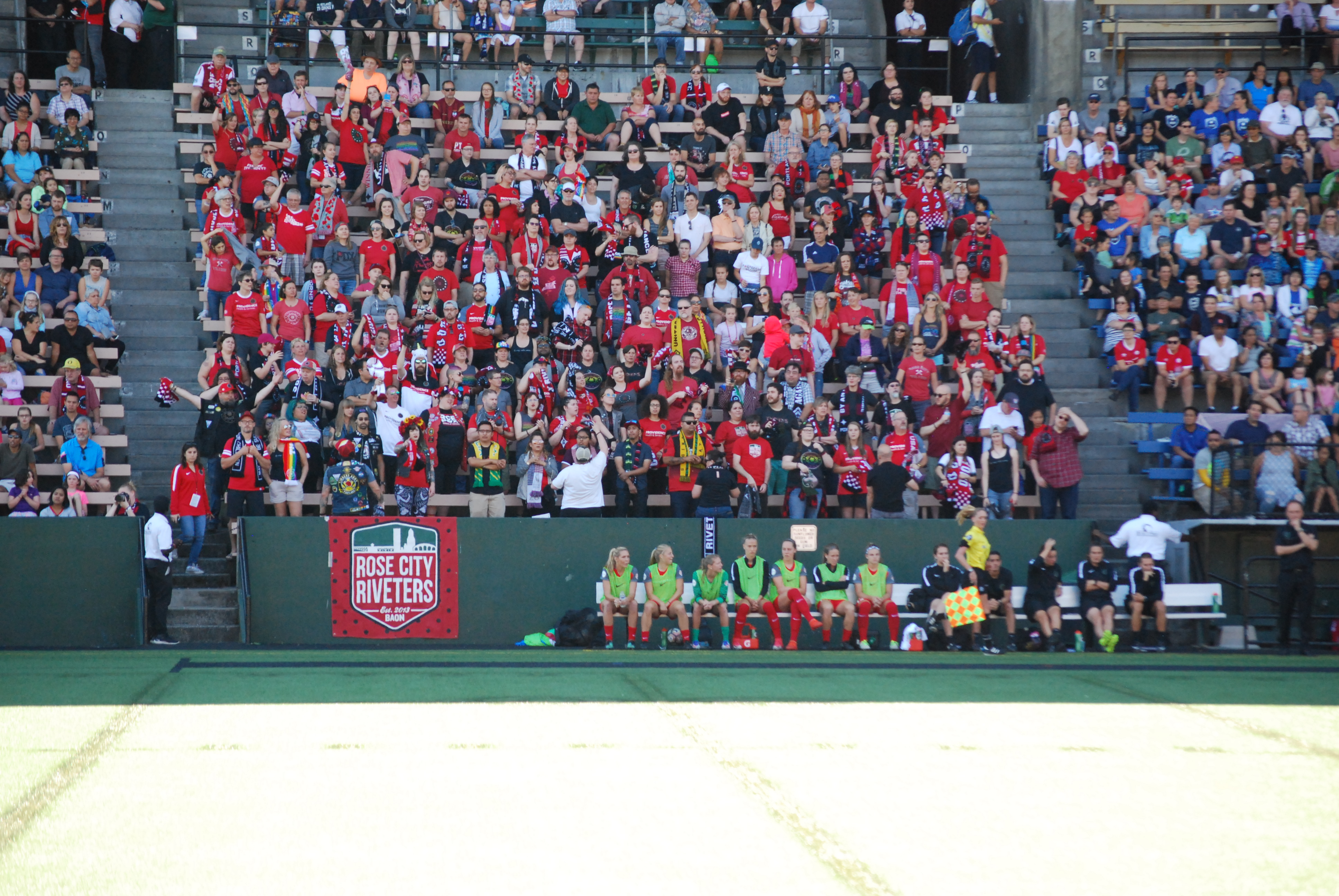
Portland Thorns traveling supporters at Seattle's Memorial Stadium

In 1985, the United States women's national soccer team was formed. Following the 1999 FIFA Women's World Cup, the first professional women's soccer league in the United States, the WUSA, was launched and lasted three years. The league was spearheaded by members of the World Cup-winning American team and featured players like Mia Hamm, Julie Foudy and Brandi Chastain, as well as top-tier international players like Germany's Birgit Prinz and China's Sun Wen. A second attempt towards a sustainable professional league, the Women's Professional Soccer (WPS), was launched in 2009 and folded in late 2011. The following year, the National Women's Soccer League (NWSL) was launched with initial support from the soccer federations of the United States, Canada, and Mexico.

In 2017, Liga MX Femenil was launched in Mexico and broke several attendance records. The league is composed of women's teams of the men's counterpart teams in Liga MX. On 20 March 2024, the league in collaboration with the NWSL, announced a new international competition named Summer Cup. This competition will feature six teams from Liga MX Femenil that will compete against teams from the NWSL. The inaugural edition is scheduled to kick-off in July 2024.

Unlike other countries, where a single club has both men's and women's squads (which obviously compete in different tournaments), such as FC Barcelona and FC Barcelona Femení, in the United States there are usually exclusively men's and women's teams in the same city, with no relation to each other, competing in the country's major soccer leagues (such as MLS and the NWSL). However, there are cases of a men's team and a women's team coincidentally having the same owner, creating a situation that is somewhat similar to what is seen in other countries, but with the two teams having different names and logos. Some examples: Utah Royals (NWSL) and Real Salt Lake (MLS); Houston Dash (NWSL) and Houston Dynamo FC (MLS); Orlando Pride (NWSL) and Orlando City SC (MLS).

=== 21st century ===
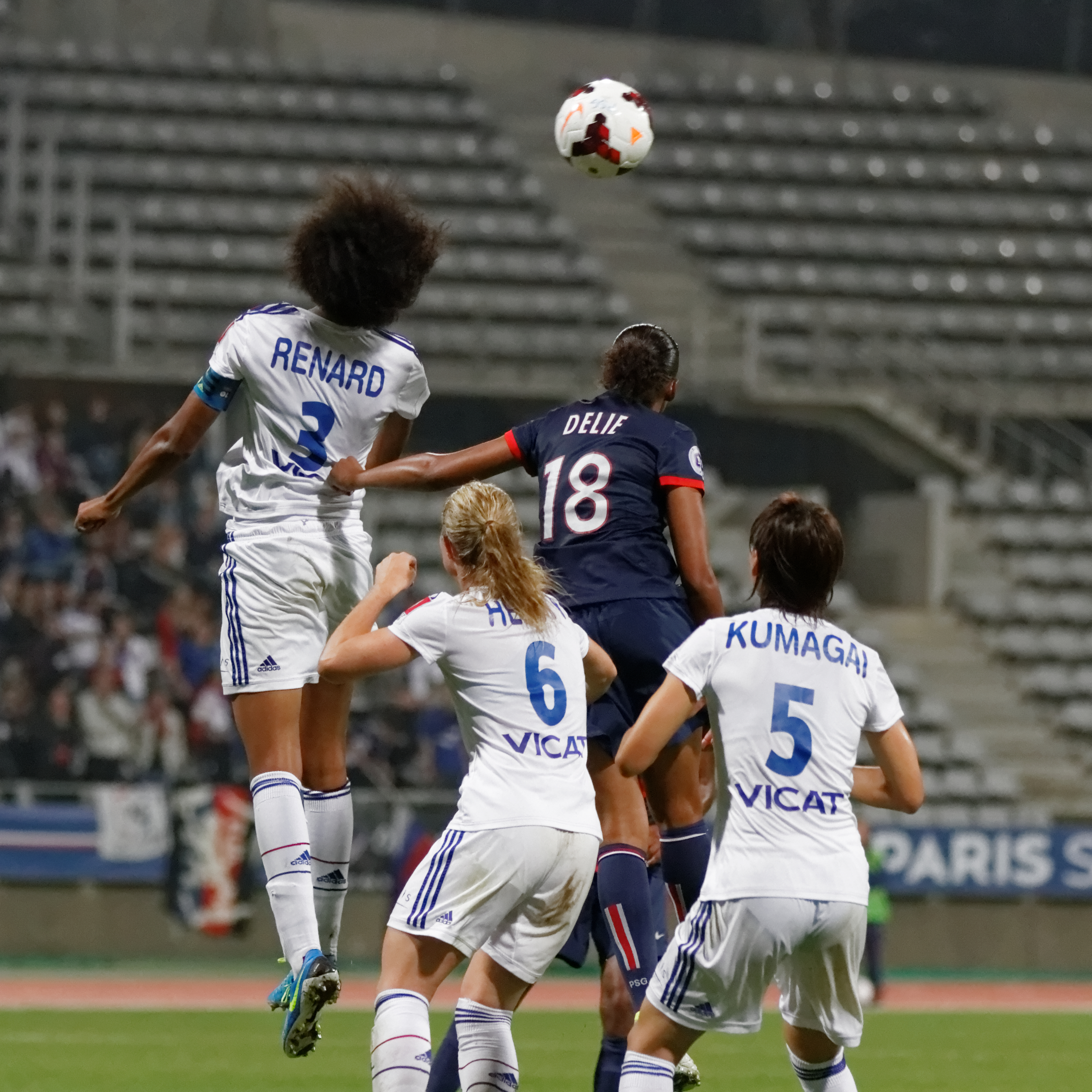
Olympique Lyonnais vs Paris Saint-Germain

A 2014 FIFA report stated that at the beginning of the 21st century, women's football was growing in both popularity and participation, and more professional leagues were being launched worldwide. From the inaugural FIFA Women's World Cup tournament held in 1991 to the 1,194,221 tickets sold for the 1999 Women's World Cup, visibility and support of women's professional football had increased around the globe.

However, as in some other sports, women's pay and opportunities are lower in comparison with professional male football players. Both national and international women's football have far less television and media coverage than the men's equivalent, but also generally have far lower average attendances. This discrepancy is on-going, while research indicates some viewers are not even able to distinguish between professional women's and men's football.

Olympique Lyonnais main rivalry is with Paris Saint-Germain, with matches between the two teams sometimes referred as the "Classique féminin". Paris is OL's main contender for national titles, as they finished in second place of D1 Féminine seven times. Lyon had never lost the D1 title to PSG until 2021 when PSG finished ahead of Lyon, and won five Coupe de France finals against Paris. In 2017 both teams reached the Champions League final, with Lyon beating Paris after a penalty shoot-out and winning its fourth title in the competition.

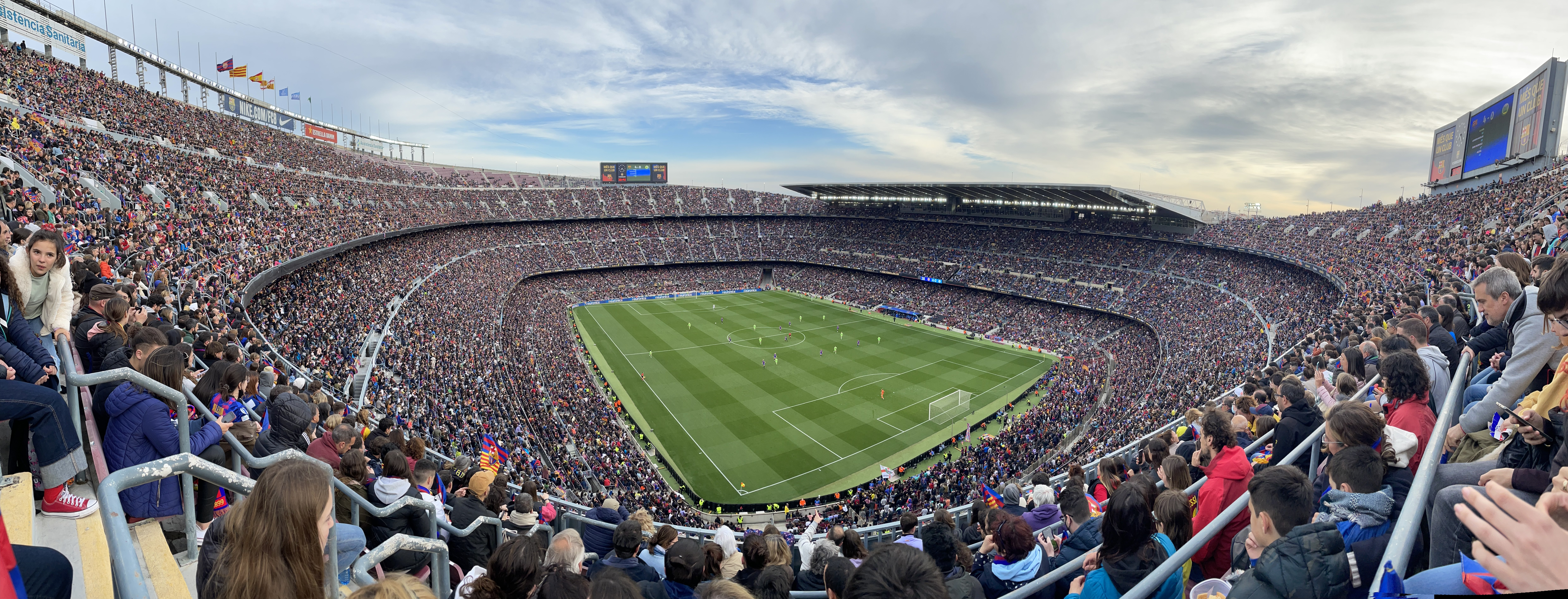
The official record attendance for a women's football match was set at Camp Nou on 22 April 2022, with 91,648 people watching Barcelona defeat Wolfsburg 5–1 (pictured).

While a number of features continue to improve, this is not the case for female coaches. They continue to be under-represented in a number of European women's leagues. However, the popularity and participation in women's football continues to grow.

In 2022, FC Barcelona had the two largest reported attendances for women's football since the 1971 Women's World Cup final between Mexico and Denmark (110,000) at the Azteca Stadium, when they played Real Madrid (91,553) and Wolfsburg (91,648) at Camp Nou for the 2021–22 UEFA Women's Champions League.

In April 2024, the 2023–24 A-League Women season set the record for the most attended season of any women's sport in Australian history, with the season recording a total attendance of 284,551 on 15 April 2024, and finishing with a final total attendance of 312,199.

== International competitions ==
=== Global ===
==== Women's World Cup ====
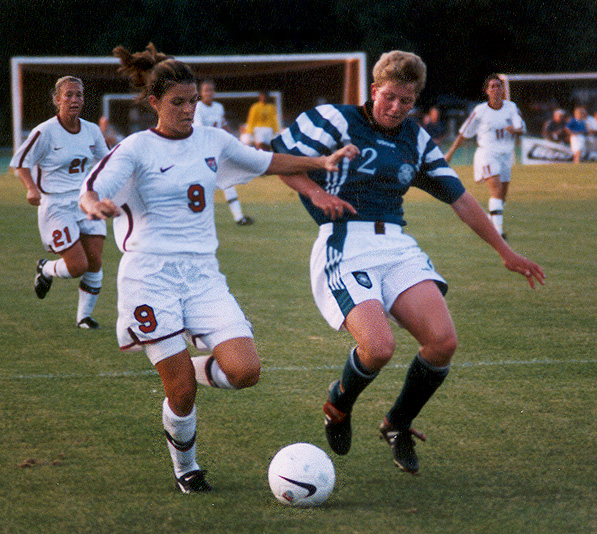
Mia Hamm (left) battles with German defender Kerstin Stegemann

The first known World Cup tournaments for women's teams are the 1970 Women's World Cup in Italy and the 1971 Women's World Cup in Mexico, both of which hold attendance records and were organised by the international women's association FIEFF. Some other major tournaments were the Women's World Invitational Tournament in Taiwan (1978–1987) and the Women's Mundialito in Japan and Italy (1981–1988). FIFA effectively ignored women's football prior to the 1988 FIFA Women's Invitation Tournament in China. FIFA's first officially-recognised women's international match is France–Netherlands (1971), albeit a retroactive recognition decided in 2003.

The first FIFA Women's World Cup was held in China in November 1991 and won by the United States. The runners-up, Norway, became the 1995 champions, beating Germany in that final, in Sweden. The United States won the 1999 final on penalties against China (with a competition-record crowd of over 90,000 in Pasadena). Germany won consecutive world titles in 2003 and 2007, winning finals against Sweden and Brazil respectively. Japan became champions in 2011, the country's first senior football world championship. The United States won the tournament again in 2015 and 2019. Spain won the tournament for the first time in 2023.

The FIFA Women's Club World Cup is a planned international club competition, with the inaugural edition scheduled for early 2028. The tournament will be held every four years. In the years without a Women's Club World Cup, a smaller annual competition—the FIFA Women's Champions Cup—will take place, beginning in early 2026.

==== Olympics ====
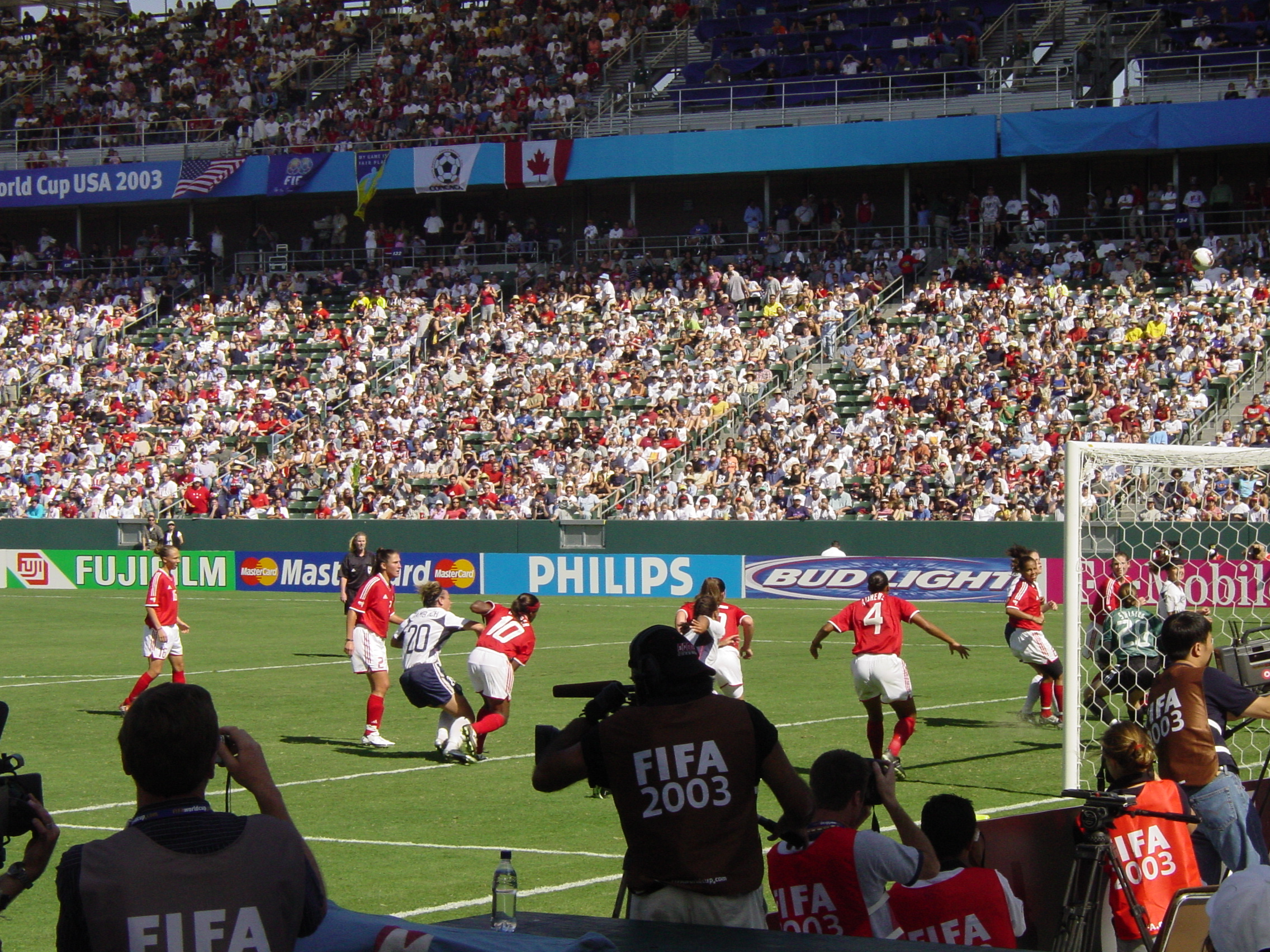
United States' Abby Wambach plays off a corner kick against Canada.

Since Football at the 1996 Summer Olympics – Women's tournament, a Women's Football Tournament has been staged at the Olympic Games. Unlike in the men's Olympic Football tournament (based on teams of mostly under-23 players), the Olympic women's teams do not have restrictions on professionalism or age.

The participation of Great Britain at the 2012 Olympic tournament was a bone of contention because England and other British Home Nations are not eligible to compete as separate entities. Eventually, both the women's and men's Great Britain teams fielded some players from the other home nations, but without their associations' active support.

Although there are women's teams of blind football (5-a-side) and cerebral palsy football (7-a-side), women's football has never been a Paralympic event.

=== North America ===
The CONCACAF W Championship is a women's football competition organized by CONCACAF that often serves as the qualifying competition to the Women's World Cup and the Olympics.

The CONCACAF W Gold Cup had its inaugural edition in 2024. It featured 12 national teams (8 from the CONCACAF region, and 4 invited from the CONMEBOL region) and was won by the United States.

The CONCACAF W Champions Cup is an annual club competition that determines the club champion for the region encompassing North America, Central America and the Caribbean.

=== Europe ===
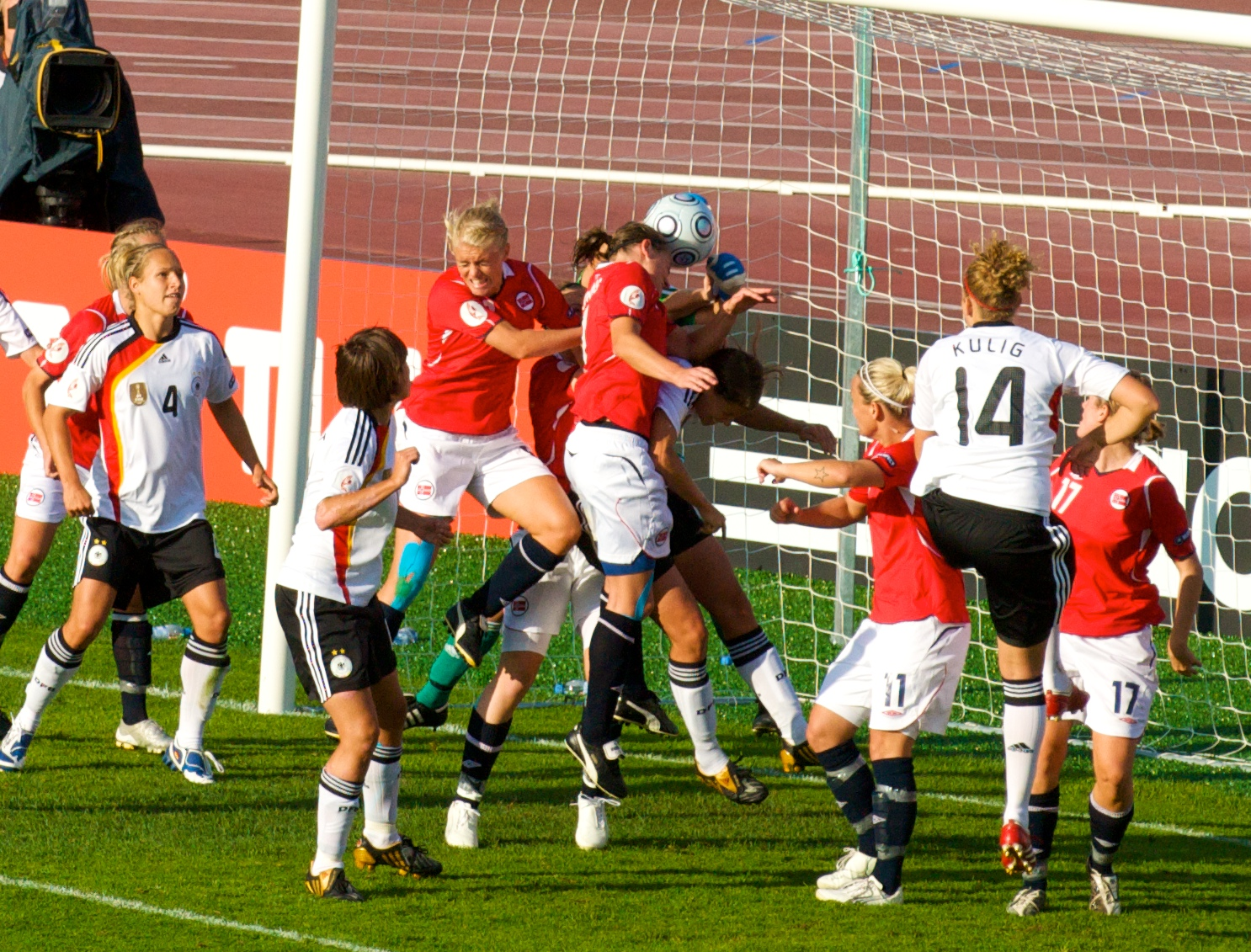
Players fighting for the ball during the match between Germany and Norway in UEFA Women's Euro 2009 in Tampere, Finland

European women's tournaments featuring national teams were held in Italy in 1969 and in 1979 as the European Competition for Women's Football. They were not recognised as "official" by UEFA, which opposed women's football until the 1970s. The UEFA Women's Championship began in 1984 under the name "European Competition For Representative Women's Teams". Now, it is also commonly referred to as the UEFA Women's Euro.

The 1984 tournament was won by Sweden. Norway won the 1987 edition. Between 1987 and 2013, the UEFA Women's Euro was dominated by Germany, which won eight titles, including six in a row from 1995 to 2013. As of 2022, the other teams that have also won the tournament are Norway in 1993, the Netherlands at home in 2017, and England at home in 2022 when the tournament was delayed a year by the Covid-19 pandemic. In 2025, England successfully defended their title against Spain, winning a penalty shootout after extra time 3-1.

In addition to the quadrennial UEFA Women's Championship, the UEFA Women's Nations League is held every two years for European women's national teams.

The UEFA Women's Champions League is an international competition that involves the top women's club teams from countries affiliated with the European governing body UEFA.

=== South America ===
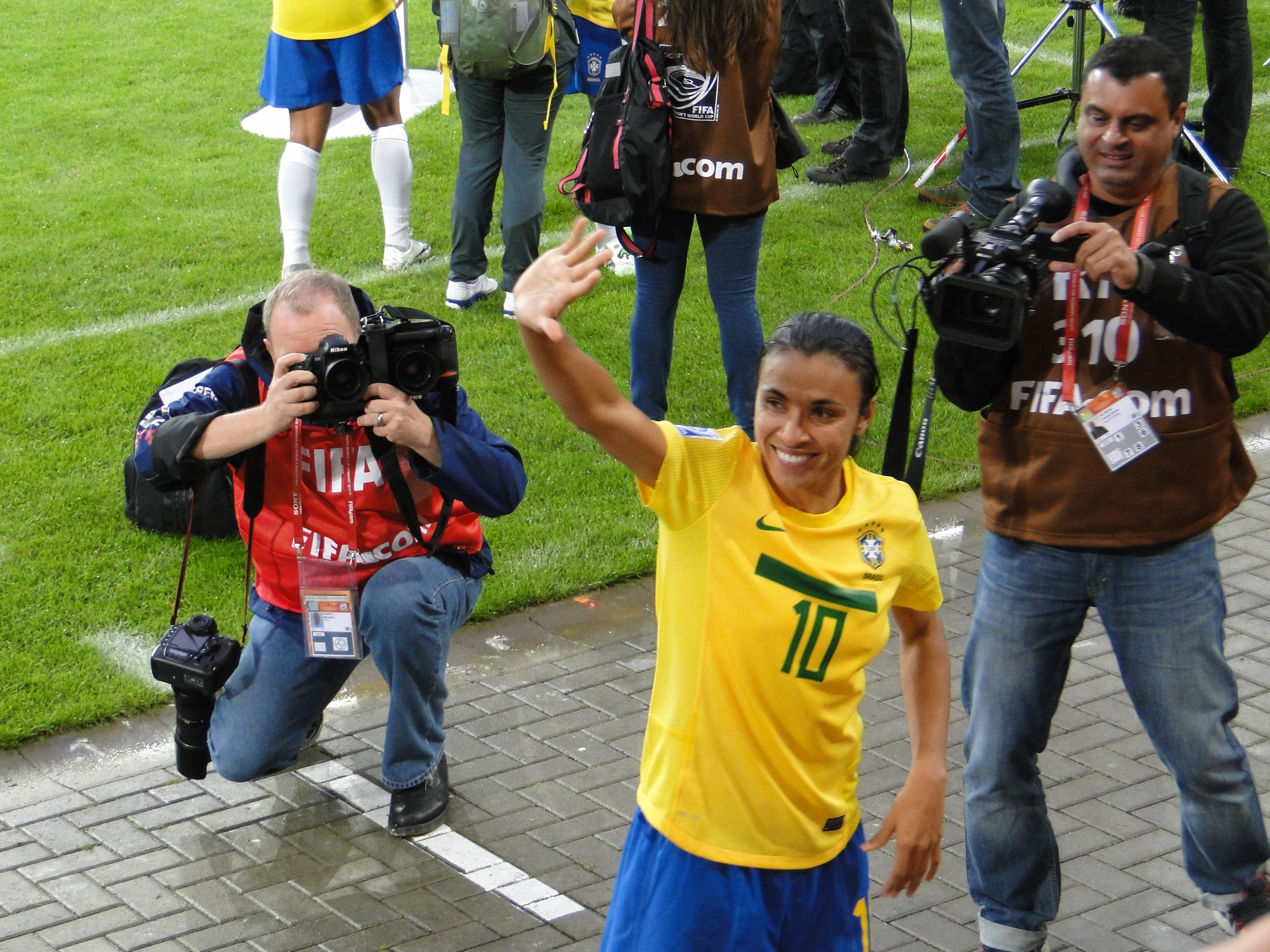
Marta of Brazil is the all-time leading scorer of the senior FIFA World Cups.

The Copa América Femenina is the main competition in women's football between national teams that are affiliated with CONMEBOL.

The Copa Libertadores Femenina, formally the CONMEBOL Libertadores Femenina, is the international club competition for women's teams that play in the CONMEBOL region. The competition started in 2009 in response to the increased interest in women's football.

=== Africa ===
The Women's Africa Cup of Nations is an international women's football competition held every two years and sanctioned by the Confederation of African Football (CAF). It was first contested in 1991, but was not held biennially until 1998. Nigeria is the most successful nation in the tournament's history with 11 titles.

The CAF Women's Champions League is an international competition that involves the top women's club teams from countries affiliated with the Confederation of African Football.

=== Asia ===
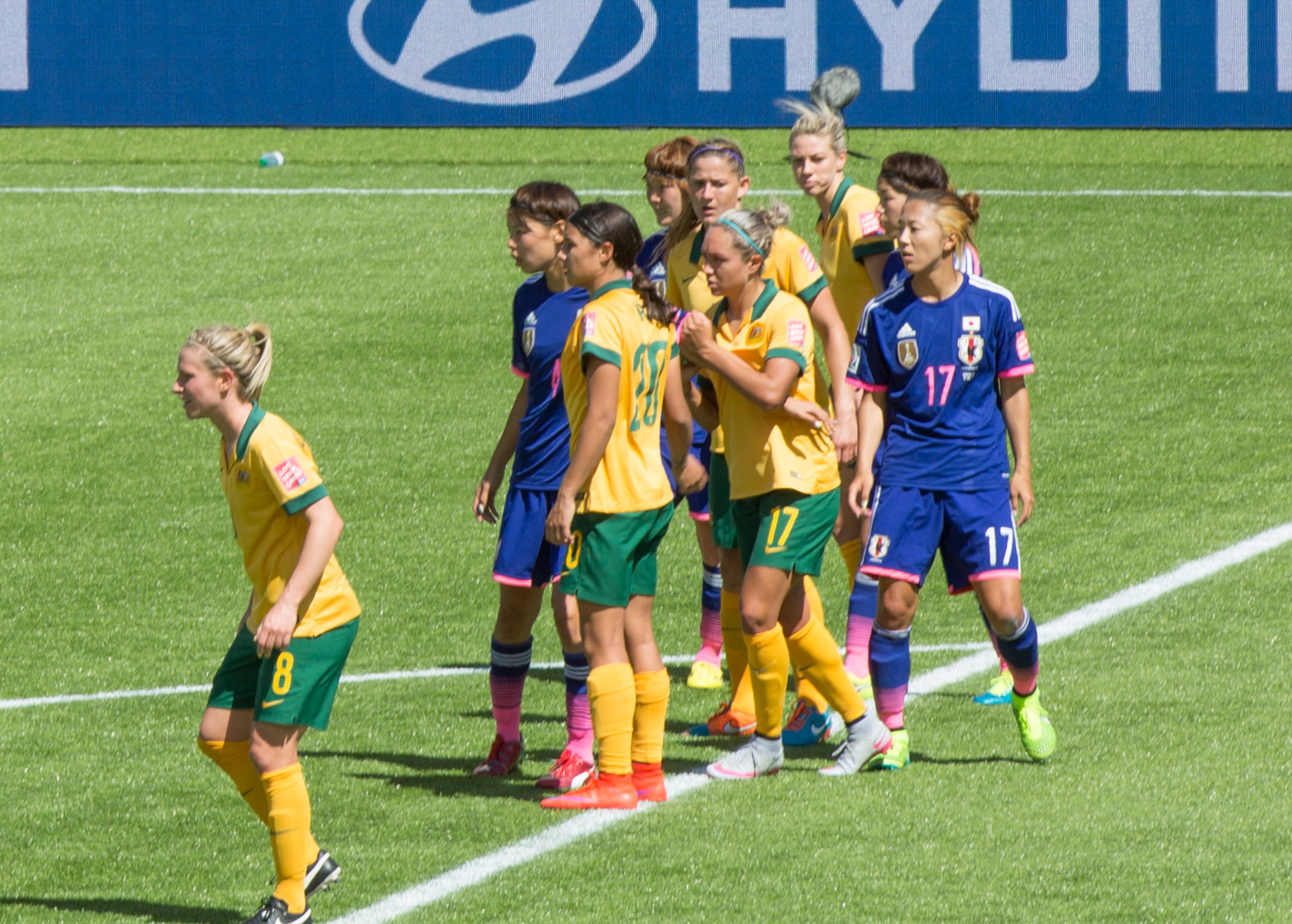
Sam Kerr with Australia during the 2015 FIFA Women's World Cup quarterfinal against Japan in Edmonton, 2015

The AFC Women's Asian Cup is a quadrennial competition in women's football for national teams which belong to the Asian Football Confederation (AFC). It is the oldest women's international football competition and premier women's football competition in the AFC region for national teams.

The SAFF Women's Championship, also called the South Asian Football Federation Women's Cup, is a competition for women's national football teams governed by the South Asian Football Federation (SAFF). India won the first 5 editions, beating Nepal four times and Bangladesh once in the final. Bangladesh is the current champion having defeated Nepal by 3–1 goals on 19 September 2022 in the final.

The AFC Women's Champions League is the top-tier women's football club competition in Asia. It involves the top clubs from countries affiliated with the Asian Football Confederation.

=== Oceania ===
The OFC Women's Nations Cup is a women's football tournament for national teams that belong to the Oceania Football Confederation (OFC). The competition has served as a qualifying tournament for the FIFA Women's World Cup since 1991.

The OFC Women's Champions League is the top-tier women's football club competition in Oceania. It involves the top clubs from countries affiliated with the Oceania Football Confederation.

== Domestic competitions ==
=== England ===
==== Women's FA Cup ====
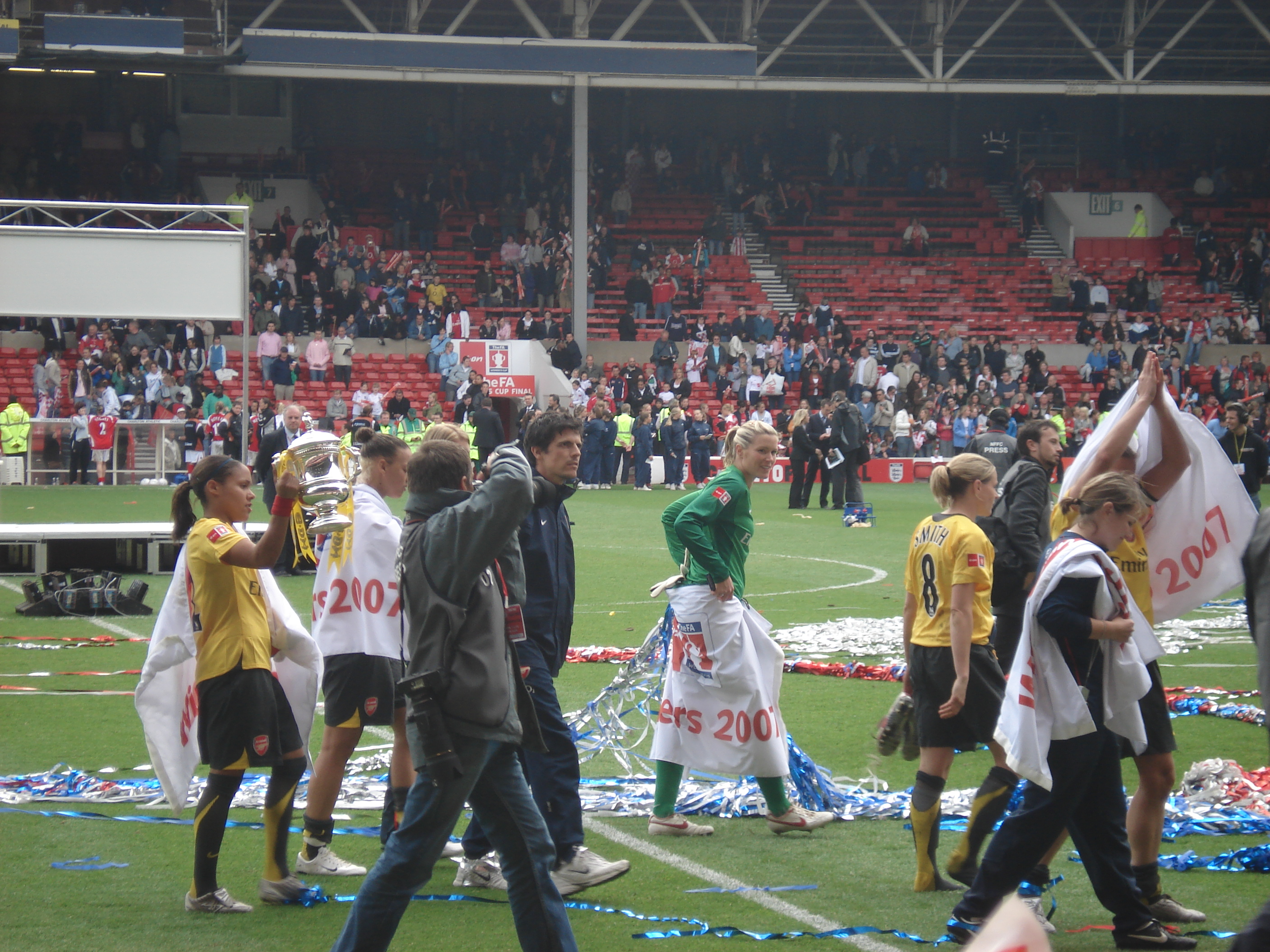
Arsenal after winning the Women's FA Cup in 2007

After the lifting of the FA ban, the Women's Football Association held its first national knockout tournament, the 1970–71 WFA Cup. Southampton Women's F.C. was the inaugural winner and became the Cup-winner eight times. From 1983 to 1994, Doncaster Belles reached ten out of eleven finals, winning six of them. As of 2023, Chelsea are the title holders and Arsenal are the club with a record 14 wins. Despite tournament sponsorship by some companies, entering the cup actually costs clubs more than they get in prize money. In 2015, it was reported that even if Notts County were to win the tournament, the £8,600 winnings would leave them out of pocket. The winners of the Men's FA Cup in the same year received £1.8 million, with teams that did not even reach the first round proper getting more than the women's winners.

== Youth tournaments ==
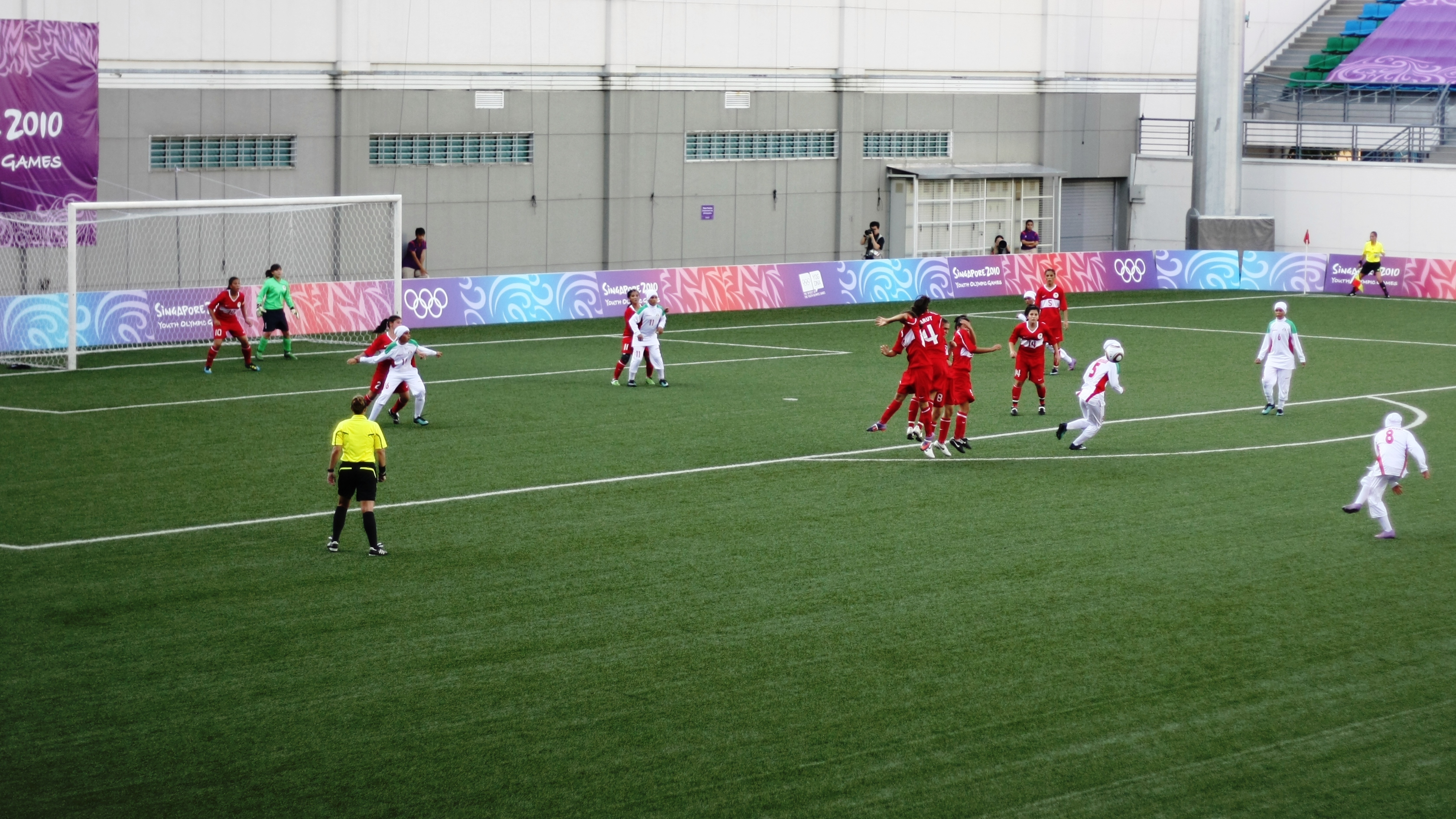
Iran vs Turkey in 2010 Youth Olympics

In 2002, FIFA inaugurated a women's youth championship, officially called the FIFA U-19 Women's World Championship. The first event was hosted by Canada. The final was an all-CONCACAF affair, with the United States defeating the host Canada 1–0 with an extra-time golden goal. The second event was held in Thailand in 2004 and won by Germany. The age limit was raised to 20, starting with the 2006 event held in Russia. Demonstrating the increasing global reach of the women's game, the winners of this event were North Korea. The tournament was renamed the FIFA U-20 Women's World Cup since the 2008 edition, which was won by the US in Chile. Japan won the tournament in France in 2018.

In 2008, FIFA instituted an under-17 world championship. The inaugural event, held in New Zealand, was won by North Korea. Spain won this tournament in Uruguay in 2018.

== Intercollegiate ==
=== United States ===
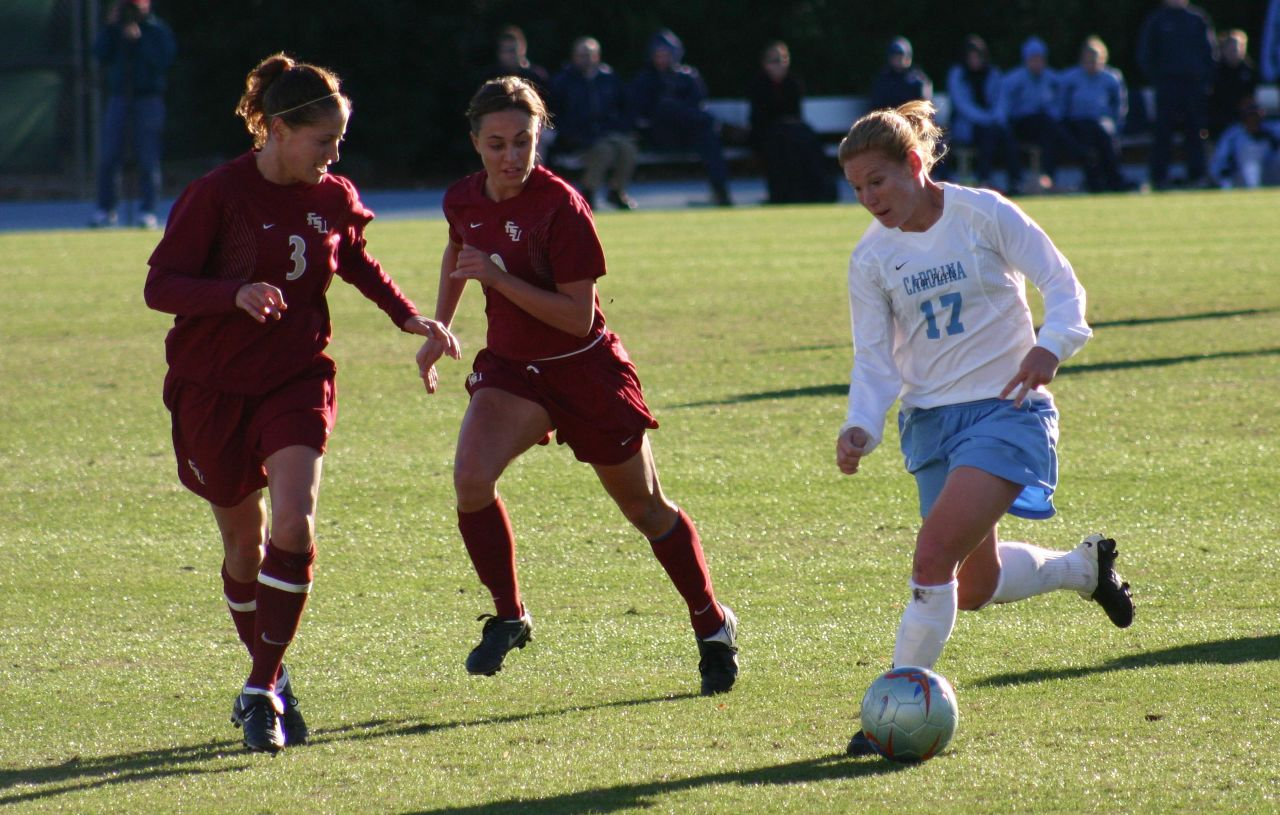
Florida State vs North Carolina, 2005

In the United States, the intercollegiate sport began from physical education programs. In the 1970s, women's club teams started to appear on college campuses, but it wasn't until the 1980s that they started to gain recognition and gained a varsity status. Brown University was the first college to grant full varsity level status to their women's soccer team. The Association for Intercollegiate Athletics for Women (AIAW) sponsored the first regional women's soccer tournament at college in the US, which was held at Brown University. The first national level tournament was held at Colorado College, which gained official AIAW sponsorship in 1981. The 1990s saw greater participation mainly due to the Title IX of 23 June 1972, which increased school's budgets and their addition of women's scholarships. Currently, there are over 700 intercollegiate women's soccer teams in the NCAA, NAIA and NJCAA.

Title IX massively increased the number of female students playing organized sports in American academic institutions. However, the college sports system and Title IX have also been criticized for promoting systemic racism and wealth inequality in women's soccer in the US. Female college soccer players are 70% white, with the sport also being "disproportionately white and upper-middle-class". Participating in American youth soccer is substantially more expensive than in basketball or tackle football, and academy soccer clubs are mainly located in suburbs and districts where black players are under-represented. As a result, in the National Women's Soccer League in 2020, the coaches and executives were 98.9% white. Three women's soccer coaches were implicated in the 2019 college admissions bribery scandal. NCAA Division I programs in money-losing sports, such as soccer, are extensively subsidized by the only two high-revenue college sports, basketball and American football, in which black players are greatly over-represented, but the players are paid no salaries and are "systematically denied the revenue they are responsible for generating".

=== Canada ===
In Canada, the intercollegiate sport is governed by U Sports women's soccer and was founded in 1987. As of the 2025 season, 52 teams from Canadian universities are divided into four conferences, drawing from the four regional associations of U Sports: Canada West, Ontario University Athletics, Réseau du sport étudiant du Québec, and Atlantic University Sport. The Season concludes with the U Sports women's soccer championship.

Prominent players at this level include Sienna Gibson, Megane Sauve, Danielle Steer, Miranda Smith, and more.

== Controversies ==
=== Misogynistic comments and decision-making around dress codes ===
Footballers around the world, both female and male, wear a kit made up of a jersey, shorts, cleats (boots), and knee-length socks worn over shin guards. In 2004, FIFA President Sepp Blatter suggested that women footballers should "wear tighter shorts and low cut shirts... to create a more female aesthetic" and attract more male fans. His comment was criticized as misogynistic by people involved with women's football and media outlets worldwide.

FC de Rakt DA1 (2008/2009)

In September 2008, the local amateur FC de Rakt women's team (FC de Rakt DA1) in the Netherlands made international headlines by swapping its old kit for a new one featuring skirts and fitted shirts. This innovation, which had been requested by the team itself for physical comfort was initially vetoed by the Royal Dutch Football Association on the grounds that, according to the laws of the game, shorts must be worn by all players, both male and female; but this decision was reversed when it was revealed that the FC de Rakt team were wearing tennis style short pants under their skirts, and were therefore technically in compliance of the "shorts rule". Denying that the kit change was merely a publicity stunt, club chairman Jan van den Elzen told Reuters:

The girls asked us if they could make a team and asked specifically to play in skirts. We said we'd try but we didn't expect to get permission for that. We've seen reactions from Belgium and Germany already saying this could be something for them. Many girls would like to play in skirts but didn't think it was possible.

21-year-old team captain Rinske Temming said:

We think they are far more elegant than the traditional shorts and furthermore they are more comfortable because the shorts are made for men. It's more about being elegant, not sexy. Female football is not so popular at the moment. In the Netherlands there's an image that it's more for men, but we hope that can change.

=== Women's football in the Middle East and North Africa ===
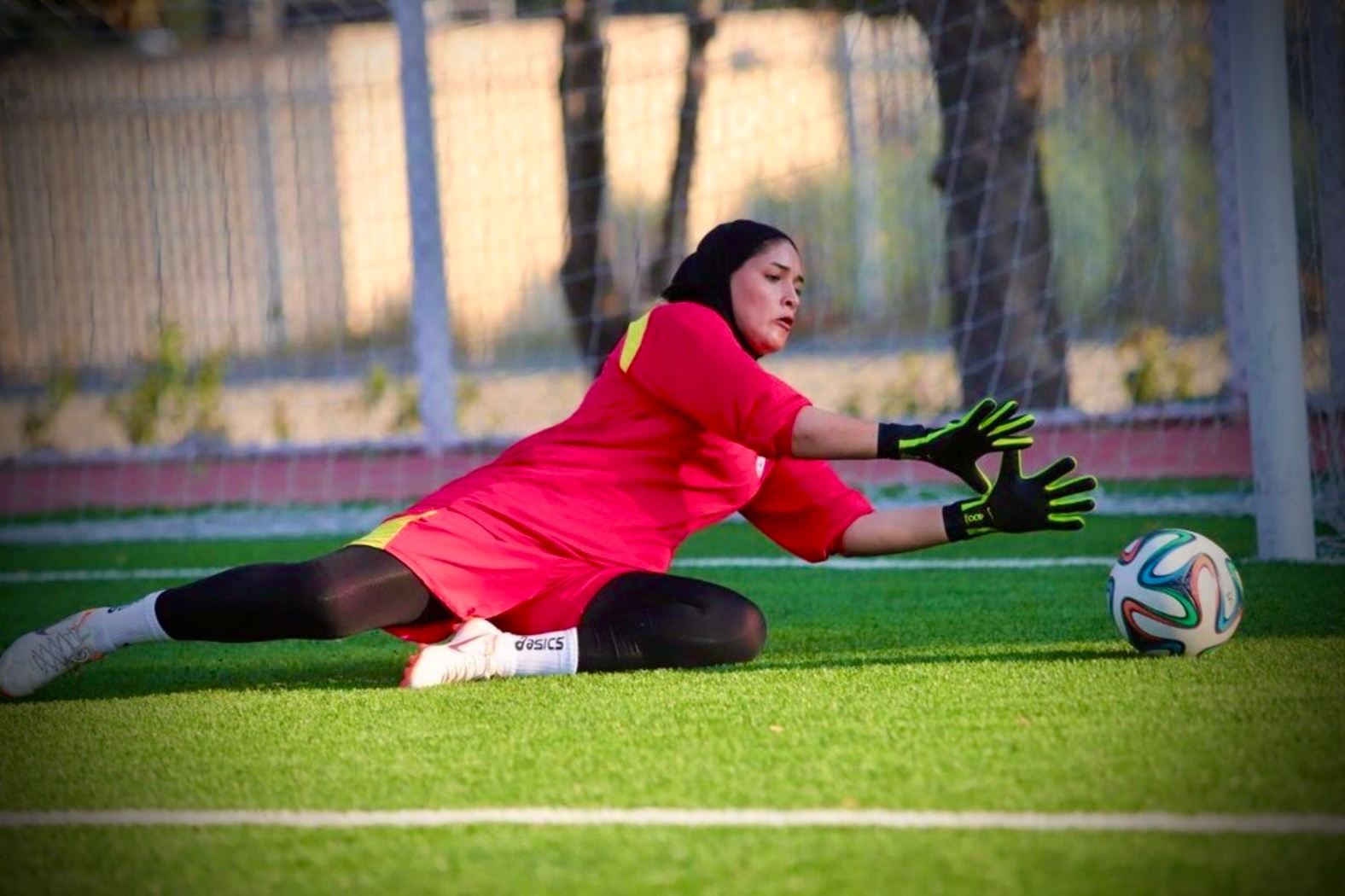
Goalkeeper Zahra Khajavi of the Iran women's national football team

Until 2020, only Morocco, Tunisia, Egypt, Algeria, Palestine, Turkey, Jordan, Iran, Lebanon, Syria, and Israel had large-scale women's competitions and national teams, which are still hindered due to discrimination against women in football.

Since 2020, countries that have traditionally been stricter like Saudi Arabia, Oman, Qatar, Somalia, Mauritania, and Sudan have begun to develop women's football in order to raise their international profiles. Sudan women's national football team debuted in 2021, and the Saudi Arabia women's team was noticed internationally, due to Saudi Arabia's Islamic conservatism.

==== Wearing of hijabs ====
In June 2011, Iran forfeited an Olympic qualification match in Jordan, after trying to take to the field in hijabs and full body suits. FIFA awarded a default 3–0 win to Jordan, explaining that the Iranian kits were "an infringement of the Laws of the Game". The decision provoked criticism from Mahmoud Ahmadinejad, while Iranian officials alleged that the actions of the Bahraini match delegate had been politically motivated. In July 2012, FIFA approved the wearing of hijab in future matches.

=== Labour disputes ===
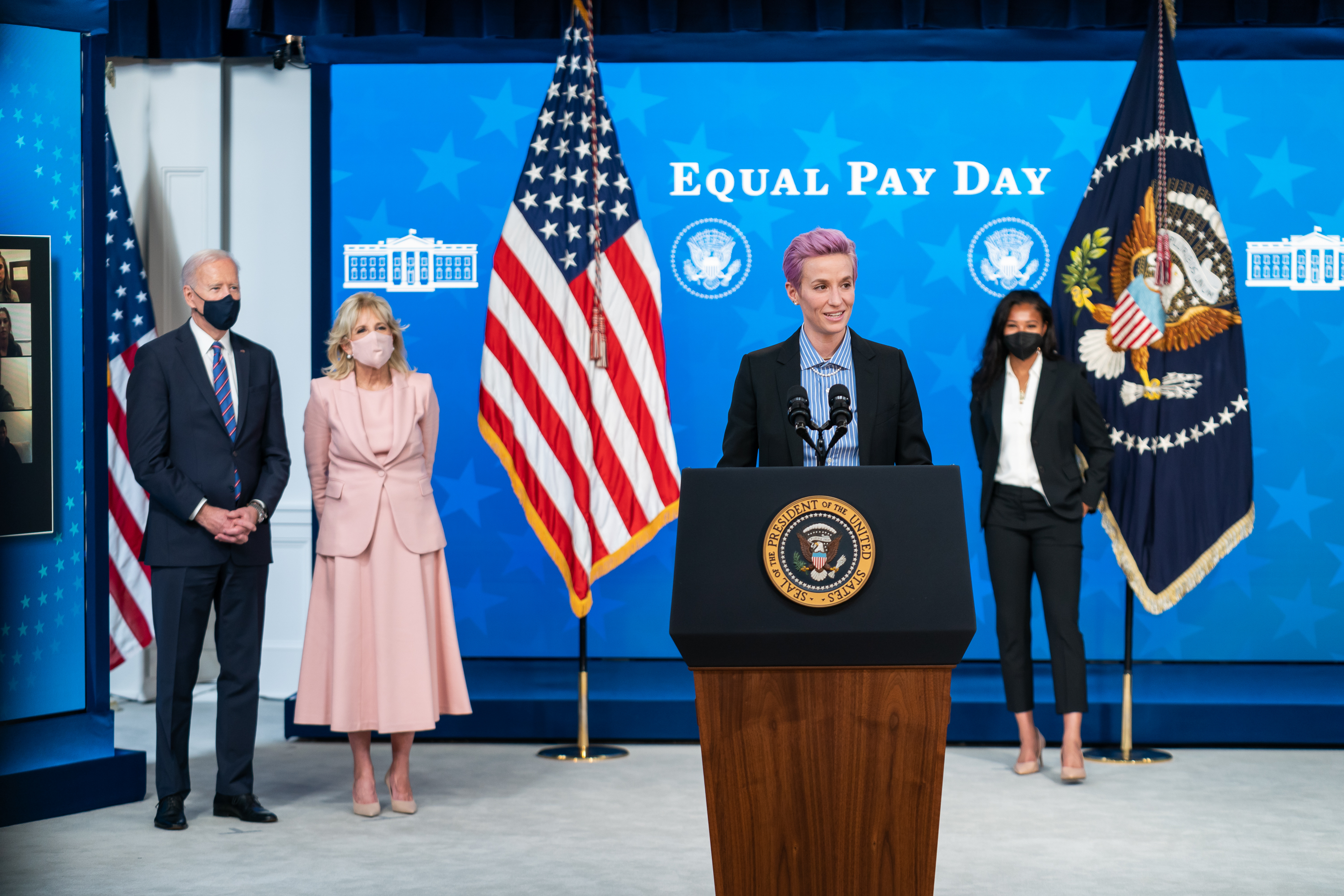
Megan Rapinoe speaks on equal pay in March 2021.

Professional women's association football players have disputed several issues specific to the sport, such as disparities in compensation compared to men's teams; insufficient pay to compete with other women's teams; unfair or exclusionary financial terms of federation business agreements involving the team; a lack of minimum standards in facilities and treatment, especially compared to men's teams in the same federation, league, or club; reports of systemic gender-related abuse of players, including sexual abuse being ignored by league or federation officials; and a lack of benefits specific to women, such as maternity leave and child care.

Disputes have been waged between national team players and federations, between club players and their teams and leagues, between referees of women's football and their governing organizations, and between players and federations or laws that prevented women from playing or professionalizing the sport.

=== Sexual harassment and abuse ===
In the early 2020s, sexual harassment and abuse became hot-button issues in women's football. In 2021 and 2022, the NWSL was forced to deal with widespread reports of abuse, with some incidents dating back to the league's formation in 2013. An investigation led to four team managers receiving lifetime bans from NWSL employment, and lesser discipline for several other managers, coaches, and executives. This issue again came to the forefront with the Rubiales affair, stemming from the behavior of Spanish federation president Luis Rubiales at the 2023 FIFA Women's World Cup final.

== See also ==
- International competitions in women's association football
- Lists of women's association football players
- Geography of women's association football
- List of women's association football clubs
- List of association football video games
- List of association football films
- Outline of association football
