= Ellen Wille =

Norwegian football director (born 1954 or 1955)

- Born: 12 July 1954 (age 72)
- Occupations: Football director and teacher
- Known for: First woman to speak in the FIFA Congress
- Height: 1.47 m (4 ft 10 in)

Ellen Wille (born 12 July 1954) is a Norwegian football director and teacher known for being the first woman to speak in the FIFA Congress. She is sometimes described as the "mother of football".

== Biography ==
Ellen Wille was born on 12 July 1954. She is from Oslo, Norway, and formerly a secondary school science teacher. Unaware of the fact that football was open to girls, she initially played handball and joined the amateur handball department of Sportsklubben Frigg in 1971. The same year, she founded the Norway Cup with Torgeir Røyert and the Norwegian newspaper Dagbladet; the newspaper also reported an unofficial football competition founded by her teammates and her after using a football during training. Five years later, saying that no one took them seriously, Wille joined the Norwegian Football Federation (NFF), which first recognised women's clubs in 1975. Wille became an NFF executive in 1985, the first woman to do so.

In 1986, during the 45th FIFA Congress, which was held in Mexico, Wille became the first woman to address the FIFA Congress. The audience, which was male-dominated, included then Fédération Internationale de Football Association (FIFA) president João Havelange and general secretary Sepp Blatter, who later succeeded Havelange as FIFA president. Although the exact wording of the speech was lost, FIFA reported that she asked Blatter to "draw more attention to women's football, particularly in terms of refereeing and the form of international tournaments". Blatter later commented that she "criticised" FIFA because they had not included women's football in their annual report. The speech was attributed to help the creation of the 1988 FIFA Women's Invitation Tournament and the FIFA Women's World Cup, with its first edition being held in 1991.

Wille's playing career ended in 1993 with Asker Fotball.

== See also ==
- Women's football in Norway
