= English Ladies Football Association =

The English Ladies' Football Association (ELFA) was formed in 1921 and active until 1922. It was arguably a direct response to the Football Association (FA)’s ban on women's football teams. The first meeting of the ELFA was held several weeks after the ban and Leonard Bridgett, the manager and coach of Stoke Ladies, was its first president. Bridgett helped to organise the first and only English Ladies Football Association Challenge Cup competition in the spring of 1922. 24 teams entered the competition and the winners were Stoke Ladies, who beat Doncaster and Bentley Ladies 3–1 on 24 June 1922.

The ELFA folded in over a year, and women continued to play in local parks and even dog-tracks, with no money or infrastructural support from the Football Association, no resources, coaches or pitches. These restrictions stayed in place for fifty years and were only lifted in 1971.

== History ==
Women's football had already been established before World War I but it had not been well received until the Football League suspended all of its matches after the 1914–15 season. As a generation of young men signed up to serve their country, the women took on traditional male roles, which had been previously considered unsuitable for women and their physical frame. The most familiar image was the munitions factory girl, who enjoyed kickabouts during her breaks. As the war progressed, women's football transformed into a more formalised sport with many women's teams emerging from munitions factories. At the time, it was organised for fund-raising for war charities. At first, people flock to see the so-called munitionettes take on teams of injured soldiers and women from other factories. Eventually, they started to enjoy the matches for the skill and ability of the women players. In August 1917, the Munitionettes' Cup was established, with the first winners being Blyth Spartans.

However, when the war was over, the factories started closing and women who had been liberated during wartime was forced to return to their "right and proper place" in society. No longer seen as being moral and appropriate, football was now considered to be unladylike and dangerous for women's health by so-called medical experts and physicians. On 5 December 1921, the FA cited strong opinions about football's unsuitability for females. They even requested the clubs belonging to the Association to refuse the use of their grounds for woman's matches. In response, on 10 December 1921, a meeting was held in Liverpool. It was attended by representatives of about 30 women's football teams. The meeting resulted in the establishment of the English Ladies Football Association (ELFA), with a league of 57 teams of amateur players. The ELFA's goals were to support women footballers, popularise the game amongst women and assist charity. One of the first teams to declare their intention of joining was Chorley Ladies FC, who had 60 members and who had raised over £3,000 for charity.

W. Henley was appointed as Secretary of the Association's pro team. He was assigned to set up another meeting in Liverpool for which about 60 clubs were expected to be present. The meeting actually took place in Blackburn on 17 December with representatives attending from 57 clubs, and expressions of interest were sent by many others unable to be present. After a long discussion, some changes in the rules were accepted to accommodate women players, including:

1. Size of playing field will be altered.
2. Introduction of a lighter ball.
3. Eliminating charging
4. Use of hands will be allowed to protect face.

=== Appointed officers of the Association ===
1. President - Leonard Bridgett (Trent Vale)
2. Vice-president - Fred K. Selman (Coventry)
3. Vice-president - T. Foley (Darwen)
4. Vice-president - Harry Longworth (Fleetwood)
5. Vice-president - Thomas Ballham (Stoke)
6. Vice-president - Mrs Barraclough (Huddersfield)

=== Activity ===
On 7 January 1922, a meeting between the ELFA's officers took place in Manchester, where they approved the ball to be used and maximum and minimum pitch sizes. The President, Leonard Bridgett, presented a cup for the Ladies' English Cup Competition. The meeting selected a representative team for the forthcoming match in Grimsby on 21 January against the Grimsby and District Ladies (formerly Cleethorpes Ladies). On 18 February 1922, a Council meeting took place at the Queen's Hotel in Birmingham. An ELFA's deputation met representatives of the Northern Union (Rugby), and their ground ban was removed for ELFA-affiliated clubs. The draw for the first round of the ELFA Cup competition was also organised then. 23 clubs participated in the competition and the results are as follows: ELFA 1st Round 18 March 1922

Team	VS
Stoke	Newcastle
Smallthorne	Chell
Birmingham	Dunlop
Coventry	Aston
Fleetwood	Manchester United
Mersey Amazons	Rochdale
Plymouth	Marazion
Ediswan	Osram
Grimsby	Doncaster Bentley
Huddersfield	Huddersfield Atalanta
Boston	Lincoln
Stoke United	Winning Team

ELFA Cup second Round 22 April 1922

Team	VS
Mersey Amazons or Rochdale	Fleetwood or Manchester
Plymouth	Ediswan
Doncaster	Lincoln
Coventry	Birmingham
Stoke	Huddersfield Alexandra
Huddersfield Atalanta	Chell United

ELFA Cup third round 20 May 1922

Team	VS
Manchester United	Doncaster
Birmingham	Stoke
Ediswan	
Huddersfield Atalanta	

ELFA Cup Semi Final

Team	VS
Huddersfield Atalanta	Doncaster Bentleys
Stoke	Ediswan

== Influence and legacy ==
Despite being short-lived, the ELFA built the foundation for the revival of interest and development of women's football. Preston Ladies faced Edinburgh Ladies for a British trophy named the Ladies' Football World Championship, on at least two occasions in the 1930s. Preston won in 1937 by a 5–1 score, but the trophy went to Edinburgh in 1939, beating Preston 5–2 in an apparently longer club competition.

A successor to the ELFA, the Women's Football Association (WFA), was established in 1969. Under the WFA, women's game continued to grow, with a national England team and a premier league. However, the WFA was also a voluntary-led organisation and had rather limited resources. Even at the top levels, matches organised by the Association were often rescheduled or cancelled. In the 1970s, there was an international recommendation for all football authorities to include the women's game and the Sex Discrimination Act, which contained a clause exempting sports, was passed in 1975. However, it was only until 1992 that the FA finally decided to lift the ban on women's game and bring it under their formal control.

In March 2018, the National Football Museum opened an extension to its permanent gallery dedicated to women's football. The extension included the English Ladies Football Association Winner's Medal awarded to Lilian Bridgett of Stoke Ladies in 1922.
