= FIFA Women's World Cup =

Women's international association football competition

- Organiser(s): FIFA
- Founded: 1991; 35 years ago
- Region: International
- Teams: 32 (48 from 2031 onwards)
- Related competitions: FIFA World Cup
- Current champions: Spain (1st title)
- Most championships: United States (4 titles)
- Broadcasters: List of broadcasters
- Website: fifa.com/womensworldcup
- Editions: 1991; 1995; 1999; 2003; 2007; 2011; 2015; 2019; 2023; 2027; 2031; 2035
- 2027 FIFA Women's World Cup

The FIFA Women's World Cup is an international association football competition contested by the senior women's national teams of the members of the Fédération Internationale de Football Association (FIFA), the sport's international governing body. The competition has been held every four years since 1991. The inaugural tournament, then called the FIFA Women's World Championship, was held in China.

Under the tournament's current format of 32 open slots, the host nation's team is automatically entered as the first slot and national teams vie for the remaining 31 slots in a three-year qualification phase. The tournament, called the World Cup Finals, is contested at venues within the host nation(s) over about one month.

The nine FIFA Women's World Cup tournaments have been won by five national teams. The United States have won four times. The other winners are Germany, with two titles, and Japan, Norway, and Spain with one title each.

Eight countries have hosted the Women's World Cup. China and the United States have each hosted the tournament twice, while Australia, Canada, France, Germany, New Zealand, and Sweden have each hosted it once. Brazil is scheduled to host the 2027 edition. The 2031 edition is expected to be jointly hosted by Costa Rica, Jamaica, Mexico, and the United States, and will be the first to be staged across more than two countries and to feature 48 teams.

== Format ==
=== Qualification ===
Qualifying tournaments are held within the six FIFA continental zones (Africa, Asia, North and Central America and Caribbean, South America, Oceania, Europe), and are organized by their respective confederations: Confederation of African Football (CAF), Asian Football Confederation (AFC), Confederation of North, Central America, and Caribbean Association Football (CONCACAF), South American Football Confederation (CONMEBOL), Oceania Football Confederation (OFC), and Union of European Football Associations (UEFA). For each tournament, FIFA decides beforehand the number of berths awarded to each of the continental zones, based on the relative strength of the confederations' teams. The hosts of the World Cup receive an automatic berth in the finals. Except for the UEFA, other confederations organize its qualification campaign throughout continental tournaments. Since the 2015 FIFA Women's World Cup, the number of finalists increased from 16 to 24 and now 32. Starting from the 2031 FIFA Women's World Cup, the number of finalists will once again increase from 32 to 48.

=== Final tournament ===
The final tournament has featured between 12 and 32 (48 starting from 2031) national teams competing over about one month in the host nation(s). There are two stages: the group stage followed by the knockout stage.

In the group stage, teams are drawn into groups of four teams each. Each group plays a round-robin tournament, in which each team is scheduled for three matches against other teams in the same group. The last round of matches of each group is scheduled at the same time to preserve fairness among all four teams. In the 2015 24-team format, the two teams finishing first and second in each group and the four best teams among those ranked third qualified for the round of 16, also called the knockout stage. Points are used to rank the teams within a group. Since 1994, Three points have been awarded for a win, one for a draw and none for a loss (before, winners received two points). Starting from 2031, the top 8 third place teams will also advance to the knockout stage.

The ranking of each team in each group is determined as follows:

1. Greatest number of points in group matches
2. Greatest goal difference in group matches
3. Greatest number of goals scored in group matches
4. If more than one team remains level after applying the above criteria, their ranking will be determined as follows:
  1. Greatest number of points in head-to-head matches among those teams
  2. Greatest goal difference in head-to-head matches among those teams
  3. Greatest number of goals scored in head-to-head matches among those teams

The knockout stage is a single-elimination tournament in which teams play each other in one-off matches, with extra time and penalty shootouts used to decide the winners if necessary. It begins with the round of 16. This is followed by the quarter-finals, semi-finals, the third-place match (contested by the losing semi-finalists), and the final. Starting from 2031, the knockout stage will include the round of 32 to account for the expansion to 48 teams.

== History ==
The first Women's World Cup tournament was in July 1970 in Italy, which Denmark won. This was followed by another non-FIFA World Cup tournament in Mexico in 1971, which Denmark also won, after defeating Mexico, 3–0, in the final at the Azteca Stadium. In the 1980s, the Mundialito tournament was held in Italy across four editions with Italy winning three titles and England winning two.

Several countries lifted bans on women's football in the 1970s, leading to new teams being established in many countries. After official continental women's tournaments were held in Asia in 1975 and Europe in 1984, Ellen Wille, Norway's delegate in 1986, declared that she wanted better effort from the FIFA Congress in promoting the women's game. This came in the form of the 1988 FIFA Women's Invitation Tournament in China as a test to see if a global women's World Cup was feasible. Twelve national teams took part in the competition – four from UEFA, three from AFC, two from CONCACAF, one each from CONMEBOL, CAF and OFC. After the opening match of the tournament between China and Canada was attended by 45,000 people, the tournament was deemed a success, with crowds averaging 20,000. Norway, who was the European champions, defeated Sweden, 1–0, in the final, while Brazil clinched third place by beating the hosts in a penalty shootout. The competition was deemed a success and on 30 June FIFA approved the establishment of an official World Cup, which was to take place in 1991 again in China. Again, twelve teams competed, this time culminating in the United States defeating Norway in the final, 2–1, with Michelle Akers scoring two goals.

The 1995 edition in Sweden saw the experiment of a timeout concept throughout the tournament which was later tightened mid-tournament to only occur after a break in play. The timeout only appeared in the one tournament which saw it scrapped. The final of the 1995 edition saw Norway, who scored 17 goals in the group stage, defeat Germany, 2–0, to capture their only title. In the 1999 edition, one of the most famous moments of the tournament was American defender Brandi Chastain's victory celebration after scored the Cup-winning penalty kick against China. She took off her jersey and waved it over her head (as men frequently do) as she celebrated. The 1999 final in the Rose Bowl in Pasadena, California, had an attendance of 90,185.

The 1999 and 2003 Women's World Cups were both held in the United States; in 2003 China was supposed to host it, but the tournament was moved because of SARS. As compensation, China retained their automatic qualification to the 2003 tournament as host nation, and was automatically chosen to host the 2007 FIFA Women's World Cup. Germany hosted the 2011 FIFA Women's World Cup, as decided by vote in October 2007. In March 2011, FIFA awarded Canada the right to host the 2015 FIFA Women's World Cup. The 2015 competition saw the field expand from 16 to 24 teams.

During the 2015 FIFA Women's World Cup, both Formiga of Brazil and Homare Sawa of Japan appeared in their record sixth World Cup, a feat that had never been achieved before by either female or male players. Christie Pearce became the oldest player to ever play in a Women's World Cup match, at the age of 40 years. In March 2015, FIFA awarded France the right to host the 2019 FIFA Women's World Cup over South Korea.

In the 2019 edition, which was held in France, the United States won the tournament for the fourth time.

In 2023, Australia and New Zealand hosted the FIFA Women's World Cup for the first time as joint hosts, and the number of participants was expanded from 24 to 32. It was also the first tournament to be held in the Southern Hemisphere. With Australia and New Zealand respectively being members of the Asian Football Confederation and Oceania Football Confederation, this was the first FIFA senior competition to be hosted across two confederations. Spain won their first-ever title, defeating England 1–0 in the final. This made Spain the 2nd nation to win both the Men's and Women's World Cup, after Germany. In 2027, Brazil will host the FIFA Women's World Cup, bringing the tournament to South America and Latin America for the first time. In 2031, Costa Rica, Jamaica, Mexico, and the United States will host the second joint hosted tournament, and the number of participants will be expanded from 32 to 48. In 2035, the home nations of the United Kingdom (England, Northern Ireland, Scotland, and Wales) will host.

== Trophy ==
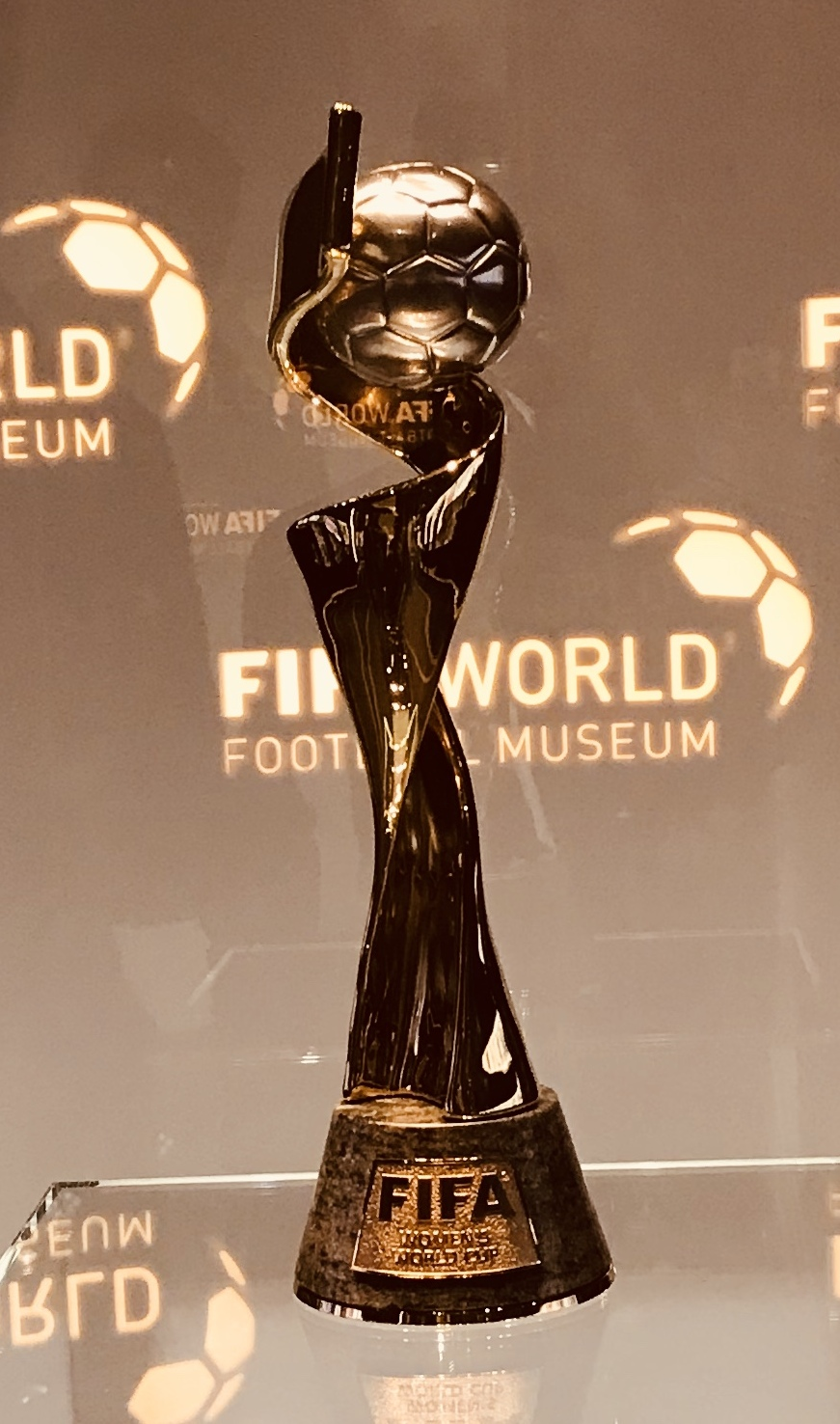
The FIFA Women's World Cup Trophy inside FIFA Museum

The current trophy was designed in 1998 by William Sawaya for the 1999 tournament and takes the form of a spiral band, enclosing a football at the top. It was sculpted by Sawaya & Moroni in Milan and stands 47 cm (19 in) tall, weighs 4.6 kg (10 lb) and is made of sterling silver clad in 23-karat yellow and white gold. In the 2010s, it was fitted with a cone-shaped base. Underneath the base, the name of each of the tournament's previous winners is engraved. The trophy had an estimated value in 2015 of approximately $30,000; by contrast, the men's World Cup trophy is fabricated in 18-karat gold and has a precious metal value of $150,000. However, a new Winner's Trophy is constructed for each women's champion to keep permanently, while there is only one original men's trophy which is retained by FIFA as each men's champion takes home a replica trophy.

Since 2007, the winners are also awarded the FIFA Champions Badge, which is worn on the jerseys of the winning team until the winners of the next tournament have been decided.

== Hosts ==
=== Selection results ===
Total of World Cup competitions hosted by each confederation (1991–2035) Confederation and year in bold has an upcoming competition
Confederation	Total	Hosts
Asian Football Confederation (AFC)	3	1991: China; 2007: China; 2023: Australia
Confederation of African Football (CAF)	0	
**Confederation of North, Central America and Caribbean Association Football** **(CONCACAF)**	4	1999: United States; 2003: United States; 2015: Canada; 2031: Costa Rica, Jamaica, Mexico, United States
**South American Football Confederation** **(CONMEBOL)**	1	2027: Brazil
Oceania Football Confederation (OFC)	1	2023: New Zealand
**Union of European Football Associations** **(UEFA)**	4	1995: Sweden; 2011: Germany; 2019: France; 2035: England, Northern Ireland, Scotland, Wales

== Attendance ==
Year	Hosts	Venues/ Cities	Total attendance	Matches	Average attendance	Highest attendances		
Year	Hosts	Venues/ Cities	Total attendance	Matches	Average attendance	Number	Venue	Game(s)
1991	China	6/4	510,000	26	18,344	65,000	Tianhe Stadium, Guangzhou	China 4–0 Norway, Opening match
1995	Sweden	5/5	112,213	26	4,316	17,158	Råsunda Stadium, Solna	Germany 0–2 Norway, final
1999	United States	8/8	1,214,209	32	37,944	90,185	Rose Bowl, Pasadena, California	United States 0–0 (5–4 p) China, final
2003	United States	6/6	679,664	32	21,240	34,144	Robert F. Kennedy Memorial Stadium, Washington, D.C.	United States 3–1 Sweden, quarter-final
2007	China	5/5	1,190,971	32	37,218	55,832	Tianjin Olympic Center, Tianjin	China 2–0 New Zealand, group stage
2011	Germany	9/9	845,751	32	26,430	73,680	Olympiastadion, Berlin	Germany 2–1 Canada, group stage
2015	Canada	6/6	1,353,506	52	26,029	54,027	BC Place, Vancouver	England 2–1 Canada, quarter-final
2019	France	9/9	1,131,312	52	21,756	57,900	Parc Olympique Lyonnais, Décines-Charpieu	United States 2–0 Netherlands, final
2023	Australia; New Zealand	10/9	1,978,274	64	30,911	75,784	Stadium Australia, Sydney	Five matches, including the final, all at Stadium Australia
2027	Brazil	8/8		64			TBA	TBA
2031	Costa Rica; Jamaica; Mexico; United States	/		104			TBA	TBA
2035	England; Northern Ireland; Scotland; Wales	/		104			TBA	TBA
Overall			9,015,900	348	25,908	90,185	Rose Bowl, Pasadena (1999)	

Notes:

- The 2003 Women's World Cup was initially planned to hosted by China, with FIFA awarding the hosting rights in October 2000. Following a SARS outbreak, it was re-awarded to the United States in May 2003.
- The 2023 FIFA Women's World Cup set a new attendance record for all FIFA competitions besides the men's FIFA World Cup.

== Results ==
Key

- aet: after extra time
- p: penalty shoot-out
- TBD: to be determined

Ed.	Year	Hosts	Final			Third-place playoff			No. of teams
Ed.	Year	Hosts	Champions	Score	Runners-up	Third place	Score	Fourth place	No. of teams
1	1991	China	United States	**2–1**	Norway	Sweden	**4–0**	Germany	12
2	1995	Sweden	Norway	**2–0**	Germany	United States	**2–0**	China	12
3	1999	United States	United States	**0–0** (a.e.t.) (5–4 p)	China	Brazil	**0–0** (Note: No extra time was played.) (5–4 p)	Norway	16
4	2003	United States (Note: The 2003 FIFA Women's World Cup was held in the United States following a SARS outbreak in China, where it was initially planned to be held.)	Germany	**2–1** (a.e.t.)	Sweden	United States	**3–1**	Canada	16
5	2007	China	Germany	**2–0**	Brazil	United States	**4–1**	Norway	16
6	2011	Germany	Japan	**2–2** (a.e.t.) (3–1 p)	United States	Sweden	**2–1**	France	16
7	2015	Canada	United States	**5–2**	Japan	England	**1–0** (a.e.t.)	Germany	24
8	2019	France	United States	**2–0**	Netherlands	Sweden	**2–1**	England	24
9	2023	Australia; New Zealand	Spain	**1–0**	England	Sweden	**2–0**	Australia	32
10	2027	Brazil							32
11	2031	Costa Rica; Jamaica; Mexico; United States							48
12	2035	England; Northern Ireland; Scotland; Wales							48

Notes

In total, 44 nations have played in at least one Women's World Cup. Of those, five nations have won the World Cup. With four titles, the United States is the most successful Women's World Cup team; it is one of only seven nations to play in every World Cup. They have also had the most top-four finishes (8), medals (8), as well as final appearances (5), including the longest streak of three consecutive finals in 2011, 2015, and 2019.

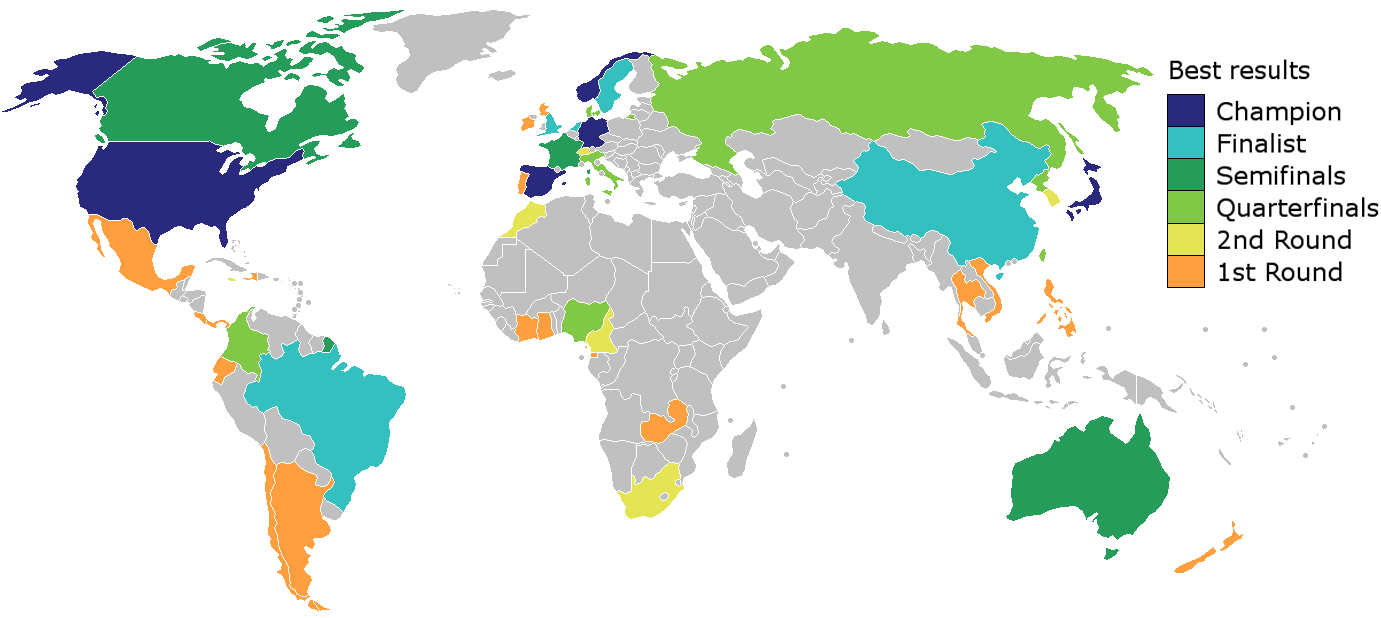
Map of countries' best results

=== Teams reaching the top four ===
Teams reaching the semi-finals
Team	Title(s)	Runners-up	Third place	Fourth place	Top 4 total
United States	4 (1991, 1999*, 2015, 2019)	1 (2011)	3 (1995, 2003*, 2007)		8
Germany	2 (2003, 2007)	1 (1995)		2 (1991, 2015)	5
Norway	1 (1995)	1 (1991)		2 (1999, 2007)	4
Japan	1 (2011)	1 (2015)			2
Spain	1 (2023)				1
Sweden		1 (2003)	4 (1991, 2011, 2019, 2023)		5
England		1 (2023)	1 (2015)	1 (2019)	3
Brazil		1 (2007)	1 (1999)		2
China		1 (1999)		1 (1995)	2
Netherlands		1 (2019)			1
Canada				1 (2003)	1
France				1 (2011)	1
Australia				1 (2023*)	1

* host nation

=== Best performance by confederations ===
As of 2023, four of the six FIFA confederations have made it to a Women's World Cup final, the only exceptions being CAF (Africa) and the OFC (Oceania). CONMEBOL is the only confederation to have made a World Cup final without winning, following Brazil's defeat in the 2007 final. The farthest advancing African team was Nigeria, who were eliminated in the quarter-finals in 1999. Oceania has sent two teams, Australia and New Zealand, to the World Cup, but Australia did not advance from the group stage until after the country's football association moved to the Asian Football Confederation, and New Zealand (which remains in the OFC) has never advanced to the knockout rounds. And finally, the best AFC team was Japan which became champions in 2011.

The United States and Norway are the only teams to have won a tournament hosted by their own confederations, with the U.S. winning in 1999 (at home) and 2015 (in Canada), and Norway in 1995 (in Sweden).

Total times teams qualified by confederation
Confederation	AFC	CAF	CONCACAF	CONMEBOL	OFC	UEFA
Champions	1	0	4	0	0	4
Runners-up	2	0	1	1	0	5
Third place	0	0	3	1	0	5
Fourth place	2	0	1	0	0	6
Finalists	3	0	5	1	0	9
Semi-finalists	5	0	9	2	0	20
Quarter-finalists	16	1	10	5	0	40
Top 16 (since 2015)	9	6	6	4	0	23
Qualifiers	35	20	26	18	9	60

== Broadcasting and revenue ==
As of 2017, the 2015 FIFA Women's World Cup final was the most watched soccer match in American history with nearly 23 million viewers, more than the 2015 NBA Finals and Stanley Cup. It was also the most watched Spanish-language broadcast in tournament history. More than 750 million viewers were reported to have watched the tournament worldwide.

The 2023 Women's World Cup generated $570 million. By comparison, that equates to 9% of the revenue generated by the 2018 men's tournament of $6.1 billion.

In 2023, FIFA separated broadcast rights for the Women's World Cup from the men's tournament for the first time, and president Gianni Infantino suggested in May 2023 that the 2023 FIFA Women's World Cup might not be broadcast in the "Big 5" European countries due to disappointing offers. As of 3 June 2023, FIFA had yet to reach broadcast agreements in Spain, Germany, Italy, France, Japan, or the United Kingdom, with German broadcasters ZDF and ARD bidding 3% as much for the Women's World Cup as the 2022 men's World Cup, French and Spanish broadcasters less than 5%, and Italian broadcasters less than 1%.

== Records and statistics ==
Players in bold are still active in international football.

=== Top goalscorers ===
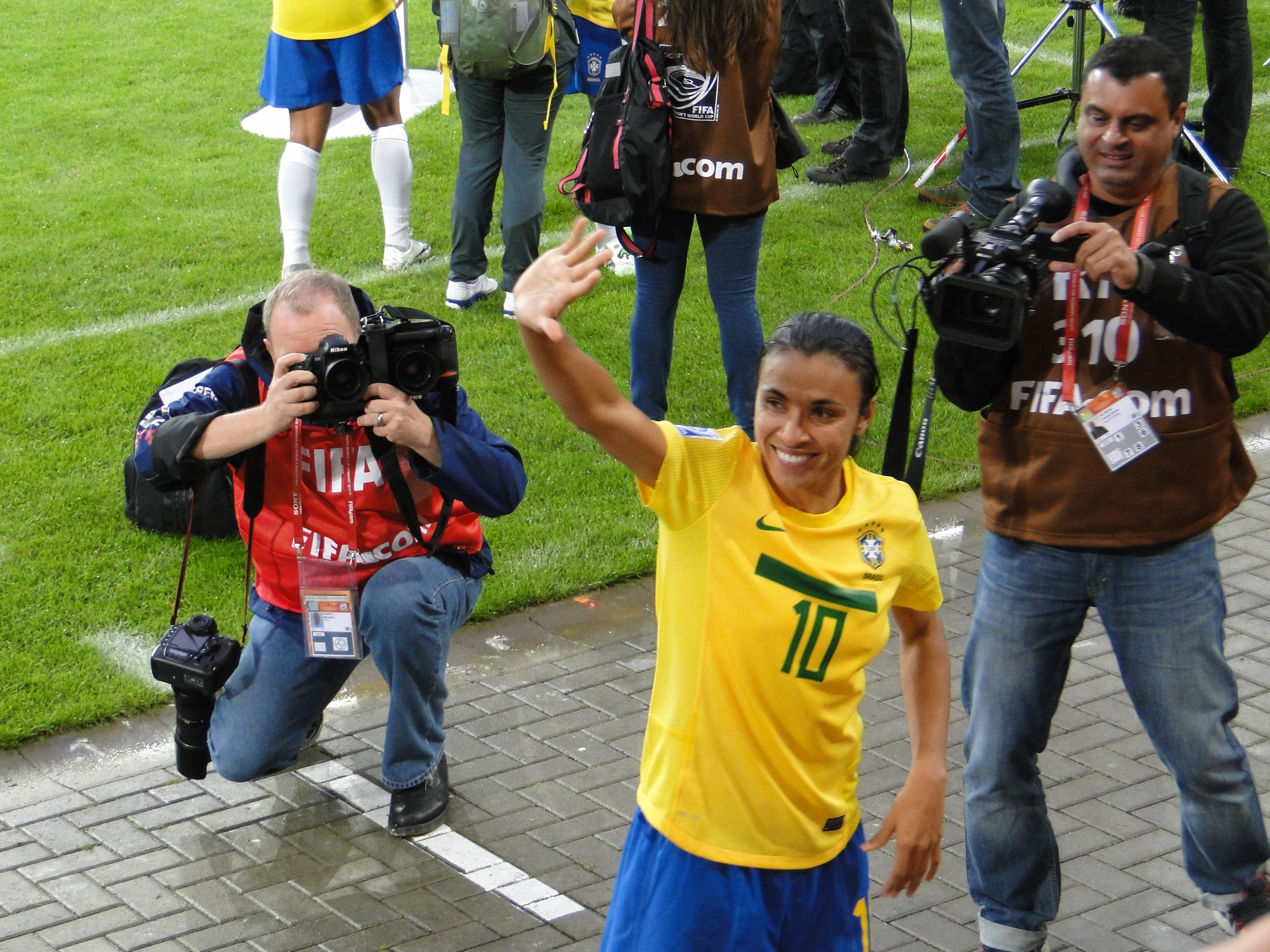
Marta of Brazil is the all-time leading scorer of the senior FIFA World Cups.

Individual

Rank	Player	Goals scored
1	(Brazil) **Marta**	17
2	(Germany) Birgit Prinz	14
2	(United States) Abby Wambach	14
4	(United States) Michelle Akers	12
5	(Brazil) **Cristiane**	11
5	(China) Sun Wen	11
5	(Germany) Bettina Wiegmann	11
8	(Canada) Christine Sinclair	10
8	(Norway) Ann Kristin Aarønes	10
8	(United States) Carli Lloyd	10

Country

Rank	Country	Goals scored
1	United States	142
2	Germany	129
3	Norway	100
4	Sweden	83
5	Brazil	71
6	England	56
7	China	55
8	Japan	54
9	Australia	48
10	France	44

== Awards ==
At the end of each World Cup, awards are presented to select players and teams for accomplishments other than their final team positions in the tournament.

- There are currently five post-tournament awards from the FIFA Technical Study Group:
  - The **Golden Ball** (currently commercially termed "adidas Golden Ball") for the best overall player of the tournament (first awarded in 1991);
  - The **Golden Boot** (currently commercially termed "adidas Golden Boot", formerly known as the Golden Shoe) for the top goalscorer of the tournament (first awarded in 1991);
  - The **Golden Glove** (currently commercially termed "adidas Golden Glove", formerly known as the Best Goalkeeper) for the best goalkeeper of the tournament (first awarded in 2003);
  - The **FIFA Young Player Award** for the best player of the tournament under 21 years of age at the start of the calendar year (first awarded in 2011);
  - The **FIFA Fair Play Trophy** for the team with the best record of fair play during the tournament (first awarded in 1991).
- There is currently one award voted on by fans during the tournament:
  - The **Player of the Match** (currently commercially termed "VISA Player of the Match") for outstanding performance by a player during each match of the tournament (first awarded in 2003).
- There is currently one award voted on by fans after the conclusion of the tournament:
  - The **Goal of the Tournament** (currently commercially termed "Hyundai Goal of the Tournament") for the fans' best goal scored during the tournament (first awarded in 2007).
- The following five awards are no longer given:
  - The **All-Star Squad** for the best squad of players of the tournament (chosen by the technical study group, awarded from 1999 to 2015);
  - The **Most Entertaining Team** for the team that entertained the fans the most during the tournament (voted on by fans after the conclusion of the tournament, awarded in 2003 and 2007);
  - The **FANtasy All-Star Team** for the fans' best eleven-player line-up of the tournament (voted on by fans after the conclusion of the tournament, awarded in 2003);
  - The **Dream Team** for the fans' best manager and eleven-player line-up of the tournament (voted on by fans after the conclusion of the tournament, awarded in 2015);
  - The **Players Who Dared to Shine** for ten key players of the tournament who "dared to shine" (chosen by the technical study group, awarded in 2019).

World Cup	Golden Ball	Golden Boot	Goals	Golden Glove	Clean sheets	FIFA Young Player Award	FIFA Fair Play Trophy
1991 China	(United States) Carin Jennings	(United States) Michelle Akers	10	Not awarded	N/A	Not awarded	Germany
1995 Sweden	(Norway) Hege Riise	(Norway) Ann Kristin Aarønes	6	Not awarded	N/A	Not awarded	Sweden
1999 United States	(China) Sun Wen	(China) Sun Wen (Brazil) Sissi	7	(China) Gao Hong (United States) Briana Scurry	5	Not awarded	China
2003 United States	(Germany) Birgit Prinz	(Germany) Birgit Prinz	7	(Germany) Silke Rottenberg	5	Not awarded	China
2007 China	(Brazil) Marta	(Brazil) Marta	7	(Germany) Nadine Angerer	6	Not awarded	Norway
2011 Germany	(Japan) Homare Sawa	(Japan) Homare Sawa	5	(United States) Hope Solo	2	(Australia) Caitlin Foord	Japan
2015 Canada	(United States) Carli Lloyd	(Germany) Célia Šašić	6	(United States) Hope Solo	5	(Canada) Kadeisha Buchanan	France
2019 France	(United States) Megan Rapinoe	(United States) Megan Rapinoe	6	(Netherlands) Sari van Veenendaal	3	(Germany) Giulia Gwinn	France
2023 Australia/New Zealand	(Spain) Aitana Bonmatí	(Japan) Hinata Miyazawa	5	(England) Mary Earps	3	(Spain) Salma Paralluelo	Japan

== Predecessors ==
- 1970 Women's World Cup
- 1971 Women's World Cup
- Women's World Invitational Tournament (1978–1987)
- Mundialito (women) (1981–1988)
- 1988 FIFA Women's Invitation Tournament

== See also ==
- FIFA Women's Club World Cup
- FIFA U-20 Women's World Cup
- FIFA U-17 Women's World Cup
- FIFA Men's World Cup
