= Hôtel de Ville, Évry-Courcouronnes =

Town hall in Évry-Courcouronnes, France

Hôtel de Ville
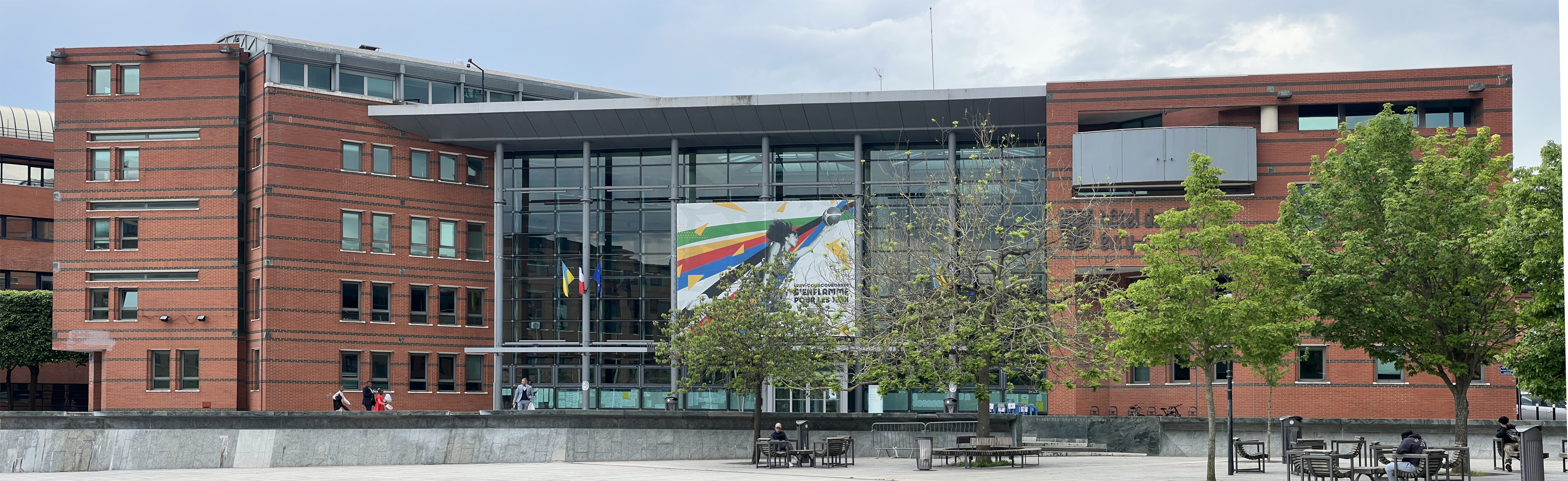
- The main frontage of the Hôtel de Ville in May 2024
- Interactive map of the Hôtel de Ville area

General information
- Type: City hall
- Architectural style: Modern style
- Location: Évry-Courcouronnes, France
- Coordinates: 48.6238°N 2.4295°E
- Completed: 1991

Design and construction
- Architect: Jacques Lévy

The Hôtel de Ville (French pronunciation: [otɛl də vil], City Hall) is a municipal building in Évry-Courcouronnes, Essonne, in the southern suburbs of Paris, France, standing on the Place des Droits de l'Homme et du Citoyen.

== History ==
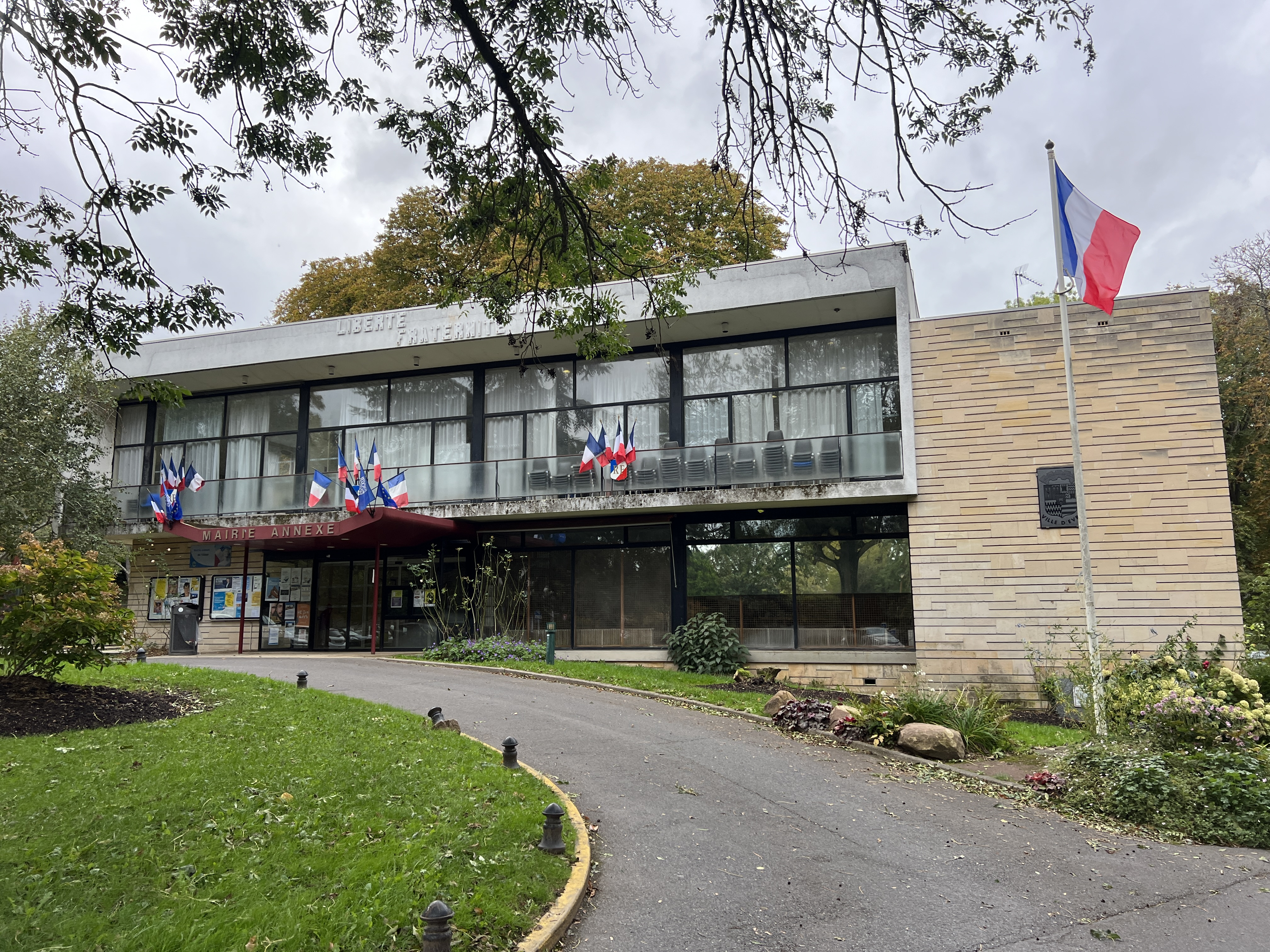
The town hall of 1961

Following the French Revolution, the town council of Évry initially met in the clergy house of the Church of Saint-Pierre-et-Saint-Paul on Avenue du Château, in the old village of Évry, close to the River Seine. In 1830, the town council moved their meetings to the former school building, now known as Salle Aguado, on Boulevard Aguado, named after the former mayor, Alejandro María Aguado, 1st Marquess of Marismas del Guadalquivir.

After the Second World War, Évry was identified as a potential new town to accommodate the growing population of Paris. The town council led by the mayor, Michel Boscher, decided to commission a new town hall on what is now Place du Général de Gaulle. The new town hall was designed in the modern style, built in concrete and glass and was officially opened by the Prime Minister of France, Michel Debré, on 29 April 1961. It featured a rectangular concrete box on the first floor, which was glazed, surrounded in concrete, and jettied out over the pavement. There was a blind concrete wall to the right of the main structure.

Following significant population growth in the 1980s, the council led by mayor, Jacques Guyard, decided to commission a more substantial town hall for the growing new town. The site they selected had been occupied by the former Château de Petit-Bourg, which was burnt down by German forces as they abandoned the area in August 1944, during the Second World War. It was located c. 2.5 kilometres (1.6 mi) southwest of the old village of Évry. The new building was designed by the architect, Jacques Lévy, in the modern style, built in red brick and glass and was officially opened by the President of France, François Mitterrand, on 28 September 1991.

The design involved a triangular shaped building facing out onto the vast new Place des Droits de l'Homme et du Citoyen (Place of the Rights of Man and of Citizens). The main frontage featured a glass façade, fronted by six steel columns supporting a canopy. It was flanked to the left by a red brick canted section, and to the right by a red brick square-shaped section. Internally, the principal rooms were the public atrium at the front on the ground floor, the municipal offices at the rear on multiple floors, and the Salle du Conseil (council chamber) and Salle des Mariages (wedding room) at the top of the main staircase. Following the amalgamation of the communes of Évry and Courcouronnes in January 2019, the building became the town hall of the combined authority.

== Sources ==
- Comte, Louis (1 February 2019). Les Mairies et Les Hôtels de Ville de la Métropole Parisienne. École d'Architecture de la ville at les territoires à Marne-la-Vallée.
