= Farida Amrani =

Moroccan trade unionist and politician (born 1976)

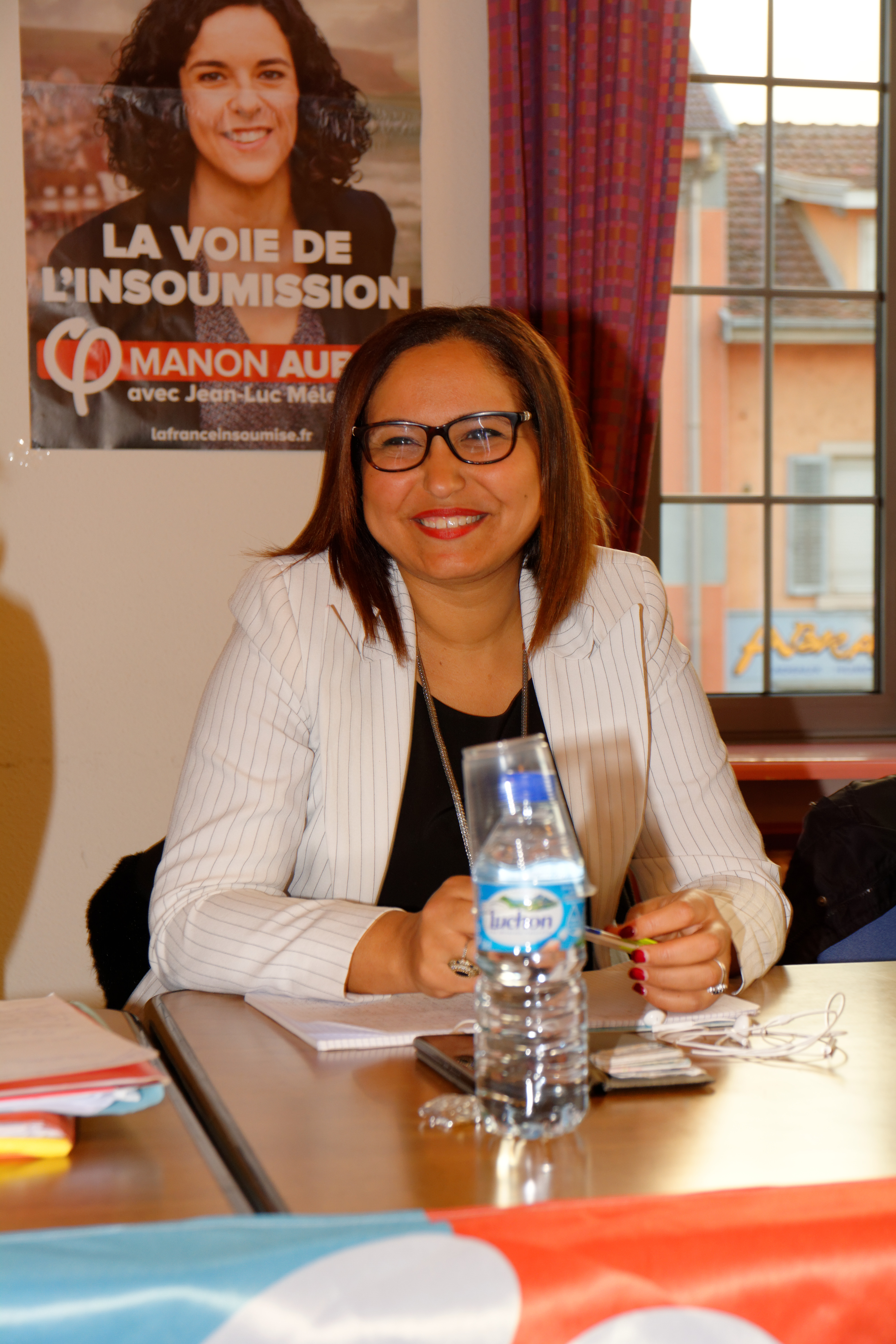
- Farida Amrani in 2019

Member of the National Assembly for Essonne's 1st constituency
- Incumbent
- Assumed office 22 June 2022
- Preceded by: Francis Chouat

Personal details
- Born: 3 September 1976 (age 49) Ajdir, Morocco
- Party: La France Insoumise

Farida Amrani (born 3 September 1976) is a Moroccan-born French trade unionist and politician from La France Insoumise. She has been a Member of Parliament since 2022.

== Early life ==
Born in Morocco in 1976, Amrani arrived in France at the age of 2.

== Career ==
After a Vocational Baccalauréat and a Transport and Logistics Services BTS, she became a territorial civil servant in 2003 at the Cœur d'Essonne.

She worked for the General Confederation of Labour.

In the 2014 French municipal elections, she ran for the Left Front list, obtaining 18.78% of the vote in the second round.

She challenged the former Prime Minister Manuel Valls in his seat at the 2017 legislative election, narrowly losing in the second round by 139 votes. She then mocked the candidacy of Manuel Valls in the 2019 Barcelona City Council election, and demanded his resignation from his mandate as a Member of Parliament. When Valls resigned from Parliament, she stood in the by-election but came in second place. She is the NUPES candidate in the Essonne's 1st constituency for the 2022 French legislative election. She came top in the first round. She was elected in the second round.

She was reelected during the 2024 snap election.

In the 2026 French municipal elections, she ran for the France Unbowed party, obtaining 29.80% of the vote in the first round losing the election to Stéphane Beaudet.
