= Francis Chouat =

French politician (1948–2024)

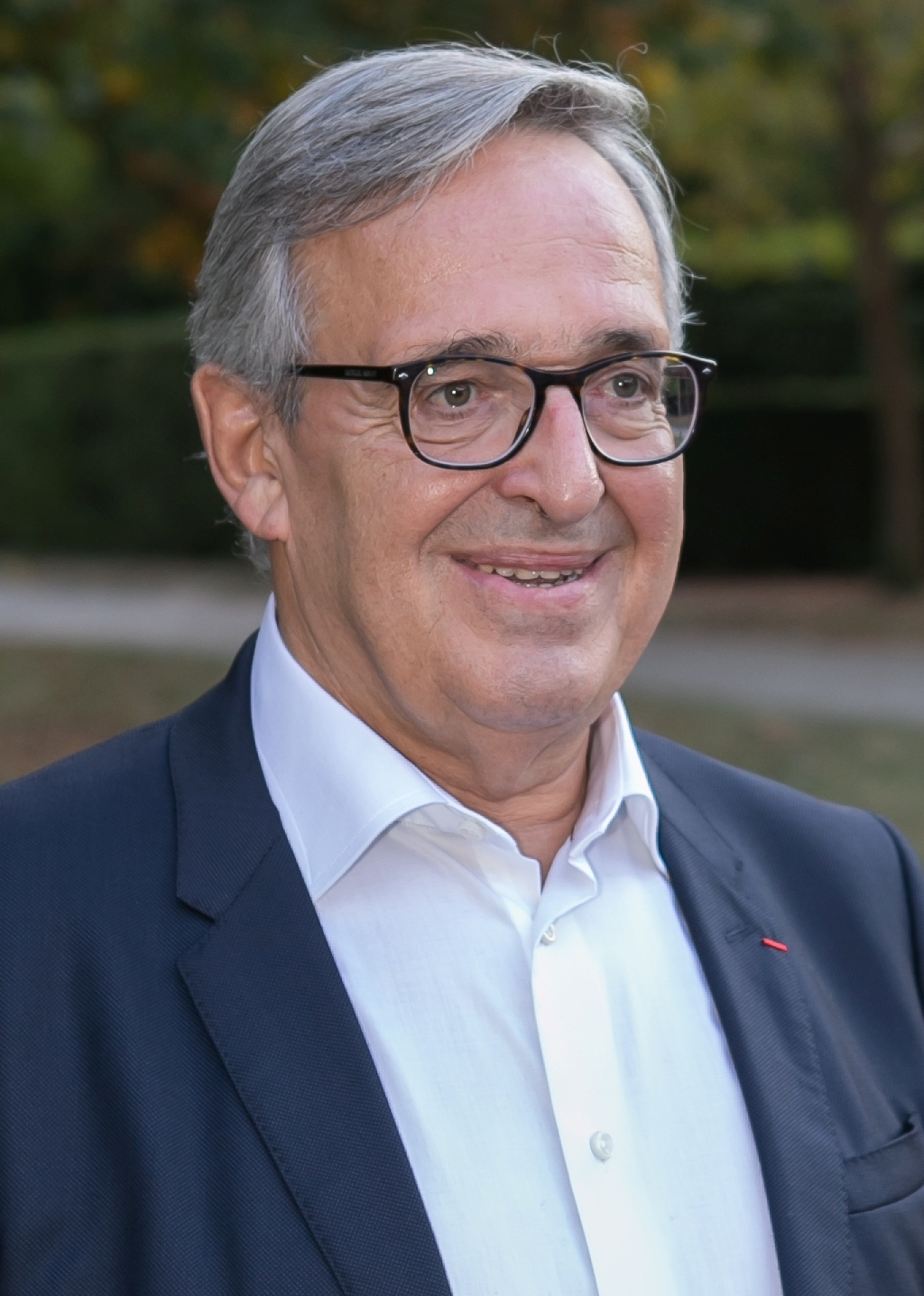
- Chouat in 2018

Member of the National Assembly for Essonne's 1st constituency
- In office 26 November 2018 – 21 June 2022
- Preceded by: Manuel Valls
- Succeeded by: Farida Amrani
- Constituency: Essonne

Mayor of Évry
- In office 3 June 2012 – 26 December 2018
- Preceded by: Manuel Valls
- Succeeded by: Danielle Valéro

Personal details
- Born: Francis Georges Chouat; 20 December 1948; Argenteuil, France
- Died: 27 July 2024 (aged 75); Paris, France
- Political party: Territories of Progress; La République En Marche! Socialist Party
- Relatives: Didier Chouat (brother)
- Profession: Historian

Francis Chouat (20 December 1948 – 27 July 2024) was a French historian and politician of La République En Marche! (LREM) who served as a member of the National Assembly after winning a by-election in 2018, representing Essonne's 1st constituency.

Chouat did not run for re-election in the 2022 French legislative election.

== Political career ==
Chouat joined the Socialist Party (PS) in 1995. From 1999 to 2002, he worked as economic policy advisor to the President of the Regional Council of Île-de-France, Jean-Paul Huchon. In 2012, he was elected mayor of Évry, succeeding Manuel Valls. Ahead of the 2017 Senate elections, he left the PS.

In parliament, Chouat served on the Committee on Cultural Affairs and Education (2018–2019) and the Finance Committee (since 2019).

In February 2020, Chouat joined the newly established Territoires de progrès movement launched by Jean-Yves Le Drian and Olivier Dussopt. By May 2020, he also joined En commun (EC), a group within LREM led by Barbara Pompili.

== Political positions ==
In July 2019, Chouat voted in favor of the French ratification of the European Union’s Comprehensive Economic and Trade Agreement (CETA) with Canada.

== Personal life and death ==
Chouat's brother Didier Chouat was also an MP. Chouat died from cancer on 27 July 2024, at the age of 75.
