= Essonne's 1st constituency =

Constituency of the National Assembly of France

1st constituency of Essonne
- inline Constituency of the National Assembly of France

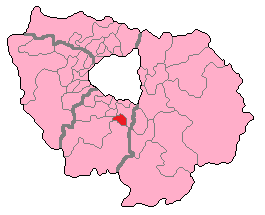
- Essonne's 1st Constituency shown within Île-de-France
- Deputy: Farida Amrani; LFI
- Department: Essonne
- Cantons: Corbeil-Essonnes-Est, Corbeil-Essonnes Ouest, Évry Nord, Évry Sud
- Registered voters: 71,200

The 1st constituency of Essonne is a French legislative constituency in the Essonne département.

== Description ==
The 1st constituency of Essonne has changed radically since it was first created. Its latest incarnation is a densely packed urban seat including the towns of Corbeil-Essonnes and Évry both of which form part of the sprawl of suburbs along the A6 motorway heading south from Paris.

Politically the seat has been rock solid for the left since the early 1970s. The constituency was represented by Prime Minister of France Manuel Valls for ten years between 2002 and 2012. He was replaced upon his appointment to the government of Jean-Marc Ayrault by Carlos Da Silva. In the 2017 legislative elections Valls was again elected as the representative.

== Deputies ==
Election	Member	Party
1967	Roger Combrisson	PCF
1968	Jean-Claude Fortuit	UDR
1973	Roger Combrisson	PCF
1978	Roger Combrisson	PCF
1981	Michel Berson	PS
1986	Proportional representation – no election by constituency	
1988	Jacques Guyard	PS
1991	Jean Albouy	PS
1993	Jacques Guyard	PS
1997	Jacques Guyard	PS
2002	Manuel Valls	PS
2007	Manuel Valls	PS
2012	Manuel Valls	PS
2017	Manuel Valls	DVG
2018 by-election	Francis Chouat	LREM
2022	Farida Amrani	LFI

== Election results ==
=== 2024 ===
Candidate	Party	Alliance	First round			Second round		
Candidate	Party	Alliance	Votes	%	+/–	Votes	%	+/–
Farida Amrani	LFI	NFP	19,109	46.07	+6.14	21,311	50.97	-8.86
Stéphane Beaudet	DIV		11,506	27.74	N/A	11,256	26.92	N/A
Thiebauld Vega	RN		9,264	22.34	+7.69	9,244	22.11	N/A
Jean Camonin	LO		565	1.36	-0.24			
Hélène Berenger	REC		539	1.30	-2.53			
Baptiste Galand	DVE		405	0.98	N/A			
Gladys Eyang	DIV		87	0.21	N/A			
Valid votes			41,475	97.52	+0.63	41,811	98.07	+5.00
Blank votes			703	1.65	-0.41	588	1.38	-3.58
Null votes			350	0.82	-0.22	235	0.55	-1.42
Turnout			42,528	60.93	+22.67	42,634	61.04	+23.23
Abstentions			27,266	39.07	-22.67	27,216	38.96	-23.23
Registered voters			69,794			69,850		
Source: Ministry of the Interior, Le Monde
Result						LFI HOLD		

=== 2022 ===
Legislative Election 2022: Essonne's 1st constituency
Party	Candidate	Votes	%	±%
LFI (NUPÉS)	Farida Amrani	10,657	39.12	+2.34
LREM (Ensemble)	Medhy Zeghouf	6,139	22.54	-7.45
RN	Thiebauld Vega	3,990	14.65	+0.93
LR (UDC)	Samira Ketfi	2,701	9.91	−0.30
REC	Joseph Saikaly	1,044	3.83	N/A
DVG	Rafik Garnit	948	3.48	N/A
Others	N/A	1,763		
Turnout		28,112	38.26	+20.17
2nd round result
LFI (NUPÉS)	Farida Amrani	15,471	59.84	+18.94
LREM (Ensemble)	Medhy Zeghouf	10,383	40.16	−18.94
Turnout		25,854	37.81	
LFI gain from LREM				

=== 2018 by-election ===
Candidate	Party	First round			Second round		
Candidate	Party	Votes	%	+/–	Votes	%	+/–
Francis Chouat	SE (REM)		29.99	+4.54	6,570	59.10	+8.81
Farida Amrani	FI		17.82	+0.21	4,546	40.90	–8.81
Grégory Saillol	RN		13.72	+3.52			
Éva Sas	EELV–PS		10.53	+10.53			
Jean-François Bayle	LR		10.21	–1.72			
Michel Nouaille	PCF–G.s		8.43	+0.85			
Mikaël Matingou	SE		4.57	+4.57			
Yavar Siyahkalroudi	UPR		1.42	+0.62			
Rémy Courtaux	SE		1.31	+1.31			
Jean Camonin	LO		1.23	+0.38			
Michèle Fédérak	NPA		0.78	+0.42			
Votes			100.00	–	11,116	100.00	–
Valid votes					11,116	90.23	+0.41
Blank votes					739	6.00	–1.38
Null votes					464	3.77	+0.97
Turnout			18.09	–22.02	12,319	17.06	–19.49
Abstentions			81.91	+22.02	59,908	82.94	+19.49
Registered voters					72,227		
Source: Préfecture de l'Essonne

- On 3 October 2018 Manuel Valls resigned as deputy and announced his candidacy for the municipal elections of 2019 in Barcelona.
- A by-election was held on 18 and 25 November 2018.

=== 2017 ===
Legislative Election 2017: Essonne's 1st constituency
Party	Candidate	Votes	%	±%
DVG	Manuel Valls	7,033	25.45	
LFI	Farida Amrani	4,868	17.61	
LR	Caroline Varin	3,298	11.93	
FN	Danielle Oger	2,819	10.20	
DVD	Alban Bakary	2,165	7.83	
PCF	Michel Nouaille	2,095	7.58	
DVD	Jean-Luc Raymond	1,904	6.89	
DIV	Dieudonne	1,061	3.84	
DLF	David Soullard	663	2.40	
Others	N/A	1,732		
Turnout		27,638	38.83	
2nd round result
DVG	Manuel Valls	11,757	50.30	
LFI	Farida Amrani	11,618	49.70	
Turnout		23,375	32.83	
DVG gain from PS		Swing		

=== 2012 ===
Legislative Election 2012: Essonne's 1st constituency
Party	Candidate	Votes	%	±%
PS	Manuel Valls	16,559	48.60	
UMP	Cristela De Oliveira	6,651	19.52	
FN	Jean-Pierre Bray	4,588	13.47	
FG	Ulysse Rabate	2,648	7.77	
EELV	Danielle Valero	1,389	4.08	
MoDem	Jacques Gering	680	2.00	
Others	N/A	1,556		
Turnout		34,071	48.45	
2nd round result
PS	Manuel Valls	20,554	65.58	
UMP	Cristela De Oliveira	10,786	34.42	
Turnout		31,340	44.54	
PS hold				

=== 2007 ===
Legislative Election 2007: Essonne's 1st constituency
Party	Candidate	Votes	%	±%
PS	Manuel Valls	15,337	41.30	
UMP	Cristela De Oliveira	11,790	31.75	
MoDem	Nathalie Boulay-Laurent	2,858	7.70	
FN	Huguette Fatna	1,413	3.80	
DIV	Mourad Saadi	1,181	3.18	
LV	Hervé Perard	1,075	2.89	
PCF	Frédéric Bourges	1,051	2.83	
Far left	Francis Couvidat	867	2.33	
Others	N/A	1,567		
Turnout		37,661	55.74	
2nd round result
PS	Manuel Valls	21,523	60.12	
UMP	Cristela De Oliveira	14,279	39.88	
Turnout		36,671	54.44	
PS hold				

=== 2002 ===
Legislative Election 2002: Essonne's 1st constituency
Party	Candidate	Votes	%	±%
PS	Manuel Valls	13,192	36.34	
UMP	Serge Dassault	13,048	35.95	
FN	Gaëtan de Fresnoye	4,064	11.20	
PCF	Bruno Piriou	1,670	4.60	
LV	Jacques Picard	1,277	3.52	
Others	N/A	3,047		
Turnout		36,910	61.16	
2nd round result
PS	Manuel Valls	18,177	52.97	
UMP	Serge Dassault	16,139	47.03	
Turnout		35,320	58.53	
PS hold				

=== 1997 ===
Legislative Election 1997: Essonne's 1st constituency
Party	Candidate	Votes	%	±%
PS	Jacques Guyard	10,429	28.09	
UDF	François Zambrowski	7,802	21.01	
FN	Jacques Olivier	7,159	19.28	
PCF	Bruno Piriou	3,977	10.71	
LV	Jacques Picard	2,177	5.86	
DVD	Maurice Riou	1,344	3.62	
LO	Yves Thoraval	1,067	2.87	
GE	Joël Roret	765	2.06	
Others	N/A	2,413		
Turnout		38,681	64.23	
2nd round result
PS	Jacques Guyard	21,620	57.03	
UDF	François Zambrowski	16,289	42.97	
Turnout		40,597	67.42	
PS hold				

== Sources ==
Official results of French elections from 2002: "Résultats électoraux officiels en France" (in French).
