= Stéphane Beaudet =

French politician (born 1972)

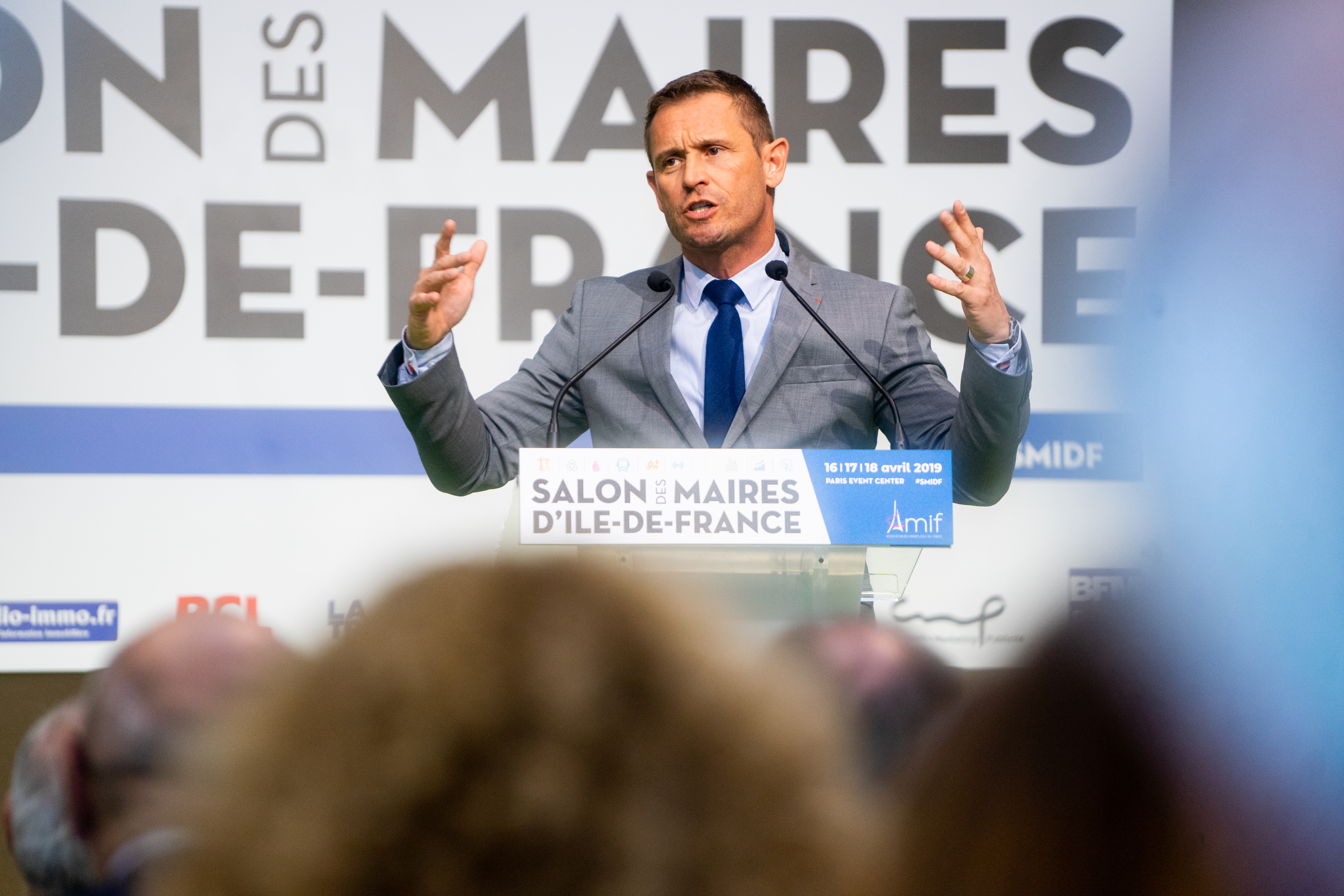
- Beaudet in 2019

Mayor of Évry-Courcouronnes
- Incumbent
- Assumed office 1 January 2019
- Preceded by: Office established

Mayor of Courcouronnes
- In office 12 March 2001 – 31 December 2018
- Preceded by: Bernard Bragard
- Succeeded by: Himself (as mayor of Évry-Courcouronnes)

Personal details
- Born: 25 May 1972 (age 53)
- Party: Independent (since 2018)
- Other political affiliations: RPR (1988–2002); UMP (2002–2015); The Republicans (2015–2018)

Stéphane Beaudet (born 25 May 1972) in Paris, is a French politician who has served as mayor of Évry-Courcouronnes since 2019. He previously served as mayor of Courcouronnes from 2001 until its merger with Évry in 2019. He is a member of the Regional Council of Île-de-France, and serves as a vice president of the council. Until 2018, he was a member of The Republicans. In the 2024 legislative election, he was a candidate for Essonne's 1st constituency.
