= 2018 Essonne's 1st constituency by-election =

← 2017	18 November 2018 (first round); 25 November 2018 (second round)	2022 →
- Turnout: 18.09% ▼22.02% (first round); 17.06% ▼19.49% (second round)
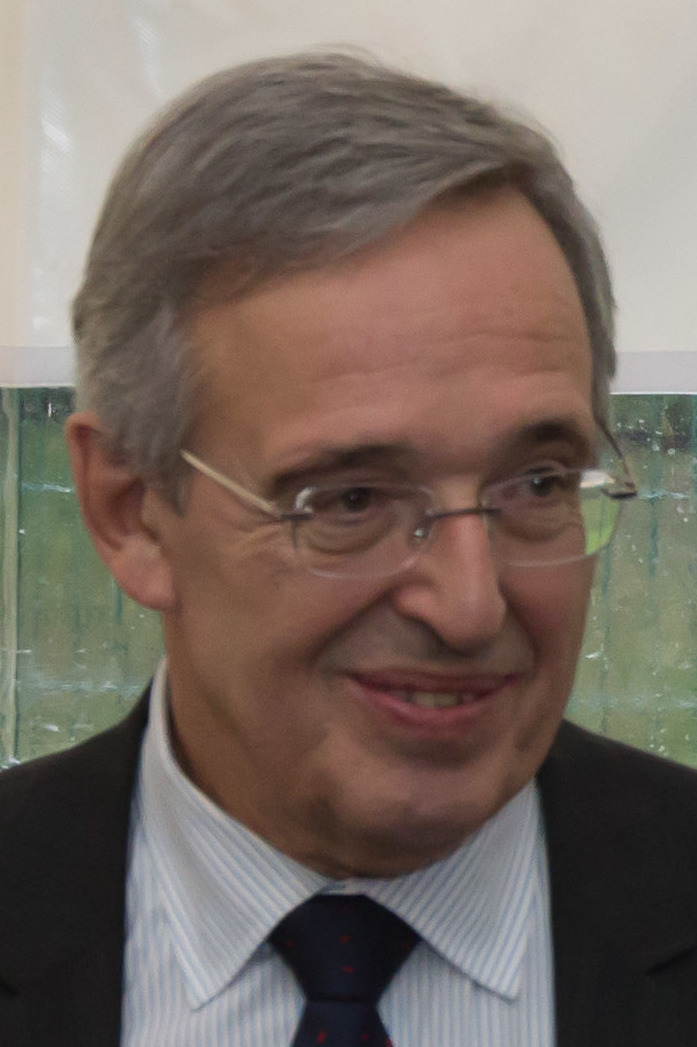

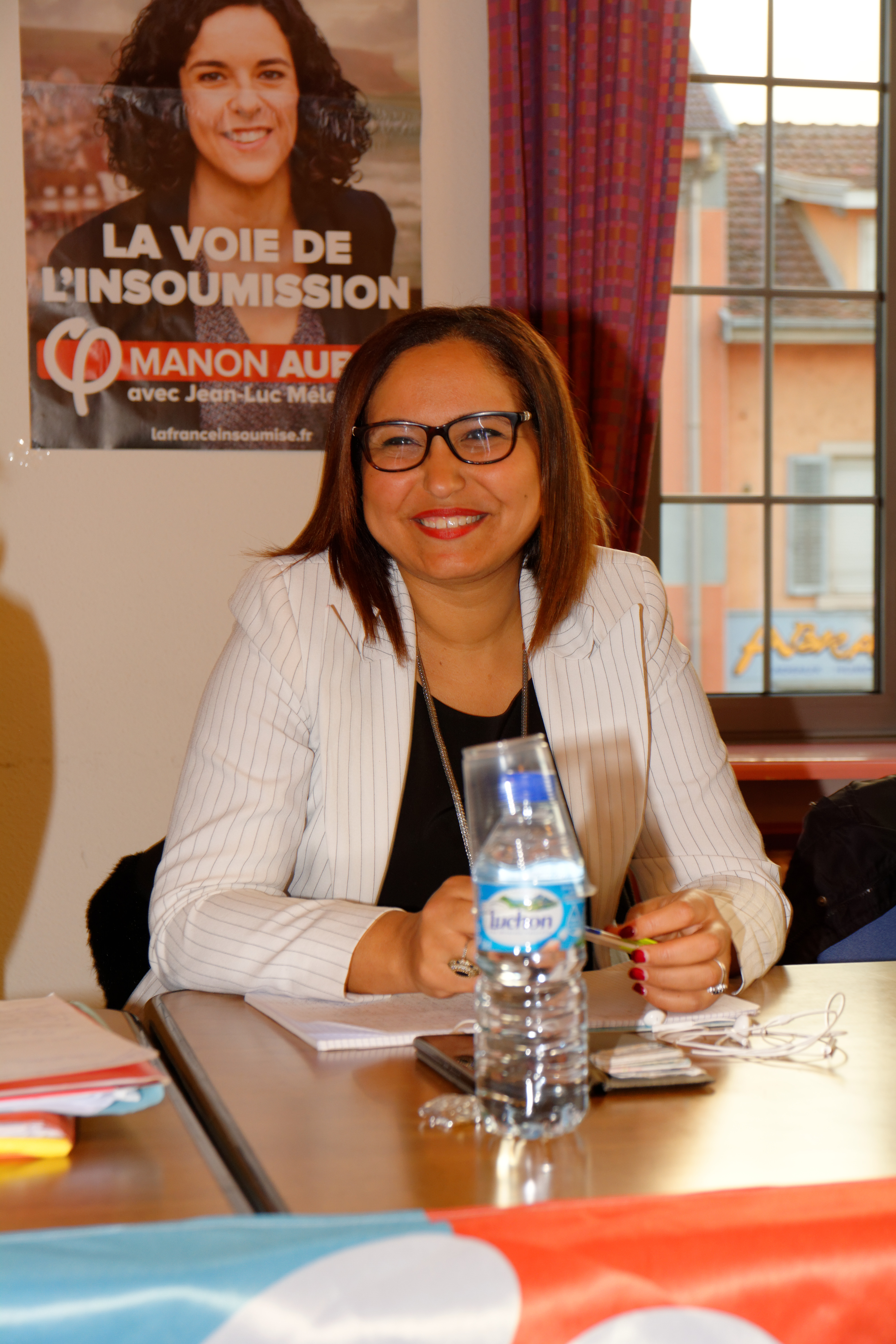

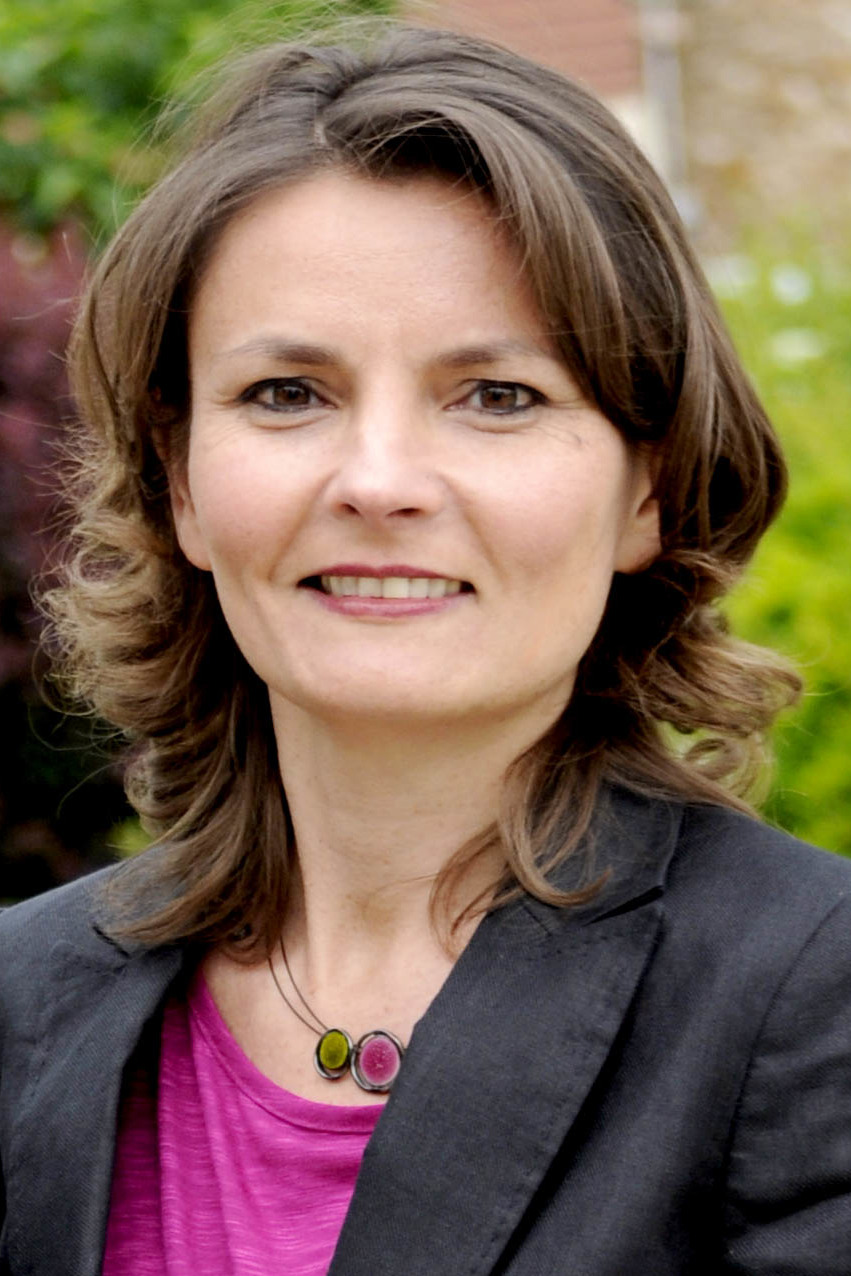
Nominee	Francis Chouat	Farida Amrani	Grégory Saillol
Party	DVG	LFI	RN
1st round %	TBA; 29.99% ▲4.54%	TBA; 17.82% ▲0.21%	TBA; 13.72% ▲3.52%
2nd round %	6,570; 59.10% ▲8.81%	4,546; 40.90% ▼8.81%	Eliminated
Nominee	Éva Sas	Jean-François Bayle	Michel Nouaille
Party	EELV	LR	PCF
1st round %	TBA; 10.53% ▲10.53%	TBA; 10.21% ▼1.72%	TBA; 8.43% ▲0.85%
2nd round %	Eliminated	Eliminated	Eliminated
Deputy before election
Manuel Valls
DVG
Elected deputy
Francis Chouat
DVG

A by-election was held in Essonne's 1st constituency on 18 November 2018, with a second round on 25 November as no candidate secured a majority of votes in the first round. The by-election was prompted by the resignation of Manuel Valls to run for the mayoralty of Barcelona in the 2019 municipal elections.

== 2017 election result ==
Candidate	Label	First round		Second round	
Candidate	Label	Votes	%	Votes	%
Manuel Valls*	DVG	7,033	25.45	11,757	50.30
Farida Amrani	LFI	4,868	17.61	11,618	49.70
Caroline Varin	LR	3,298	11.93		
Danielle Oger	FN	2,819	10.20		
Alban Bakary	DVD	2,165	7.83		
Michel Nouaille	PCF	2,095	7.58		
Jean-Luc Raymond	DVD	1,904	6.89		
Dieudonné	DIV	1,061	3.84		
David Soullard	DLF	663	2.40		
Jacques Borie	DVG	298	1.08		
Sylvain Lacassagne	PP	289	1.05		
Jean Camonin	LO	234	0.85		
François Bouvard	UPR	220	0.80		
Saliou Diallo	DVG	218	0.79		
Gautier Albignac	DIV	113	0.41		
Éric Berlingen	UDMF	102	0.37		
Stéphane Legruel	NPA	100	0.36		
Mohamed Lemgharraz	DIV	97	0.35		
François Risacher	POID	56	0.20		
Nathalie Jolly	DVD	4	0.01		
Fadhel Mahbouli	ECO	1	0.00		
Jacqueline Sabattier	PCD	0	0.00		
Votes		27,638	100.00	23,375	100.00
Valid votes		27,638	96.81	23,375	89.82
Blank votes		672	2.35	1,920	7.38
Null votes		239	0.84	729	2.80
Turnout		28,549	40.11	26,024	36.55
Abstentions		42,628	59.89	45,176	63.45
Registered voters		71,177		71,200	
Source: Ministry of the Interior * Incumbent deputy

== 2018 by-election result ==
Candidate	Party	First round			Second round		
Candidate	Party	Votes	%	+/–	Votes	%	+/–
Francis Chouat	DVG		29.99	+4.54	6,570	59.10	+8.81
Farida Amrani	LFI		17.82	+0.21	4,546	40.90	–8.81
Grégory Saillol	RN		13.72	+3.52			
Éva Sas	EELV		10.53	+10.53			
Jean-François Bayle	LR		10.21	–1.72			
Michel Nouaille	PCF		8.43	+0.85			
Mikaël Matingou	DIV		4.57	+4.57			
Yavar Siyahkalroudi	UPR		1.42	+0.62			
Rémy Courtaux	DIV		1.31	+1.31			
Jean Camonin	LO		1.23	+0.38			
Michèle Fédérak	NPA		0.78	+0.42			
Votes			100.00	–	11,116	100.00	–
Valid votes					11,116	90.23	+0.41
Blank votes					739	6.00	–1.38
Null votes					464	3.77	+0.97
Turnout			18.09	–22.02	12,319	17.06	–19.49
Abstentions			81.91	+22.02	59,908	82.94	+19.49
Registered voters					72,227		
Source: Préfecture de l'Essonne
