= Carlos Da Silva (politician) =

French politician (born 1974)

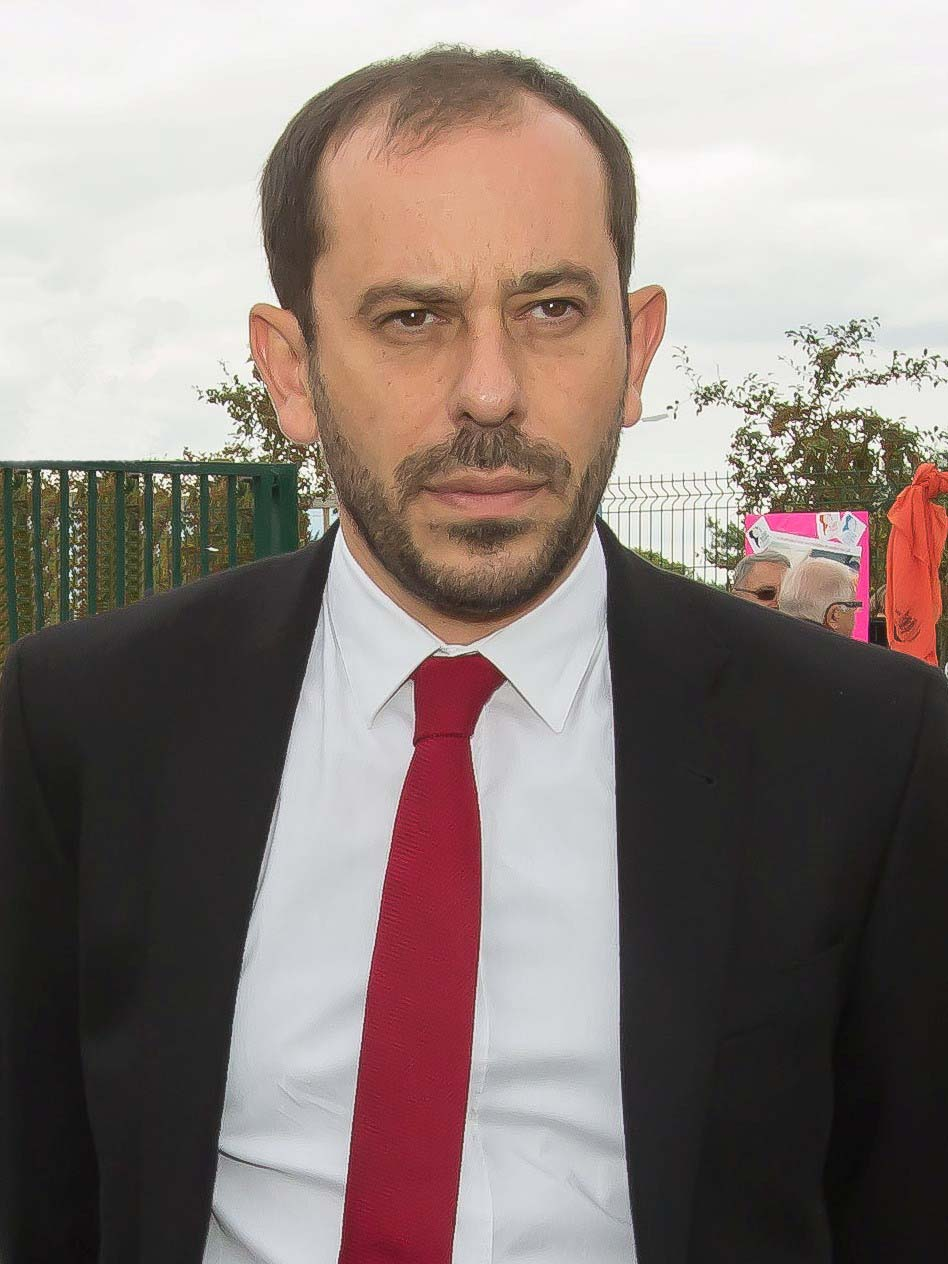
- Da Silva in 2015

Member of the French National Assembly for Essonne's 1st constituency
- In office 22 July 2012 – 6 January 2017
- Preceded by: Manuel Valls
- Succeeded by: Manuel Valls
- In office 17 June 2012 – 19 June 2012
- Preceded by: Manuel Valls
- Succeeded by: Manuel Valls

Personal details
- Born: 16 November 1974 (age 51)
- Party: Socialist Party (since 1998)

Carlos Da Silva (born 16 November 1974) is a French politician. From 2012 to 2017, he was a member of the National Assembly. He has been a member of the Socialist Party since 1998.
