= Maud Medenou =

French basketball player (born 1990)

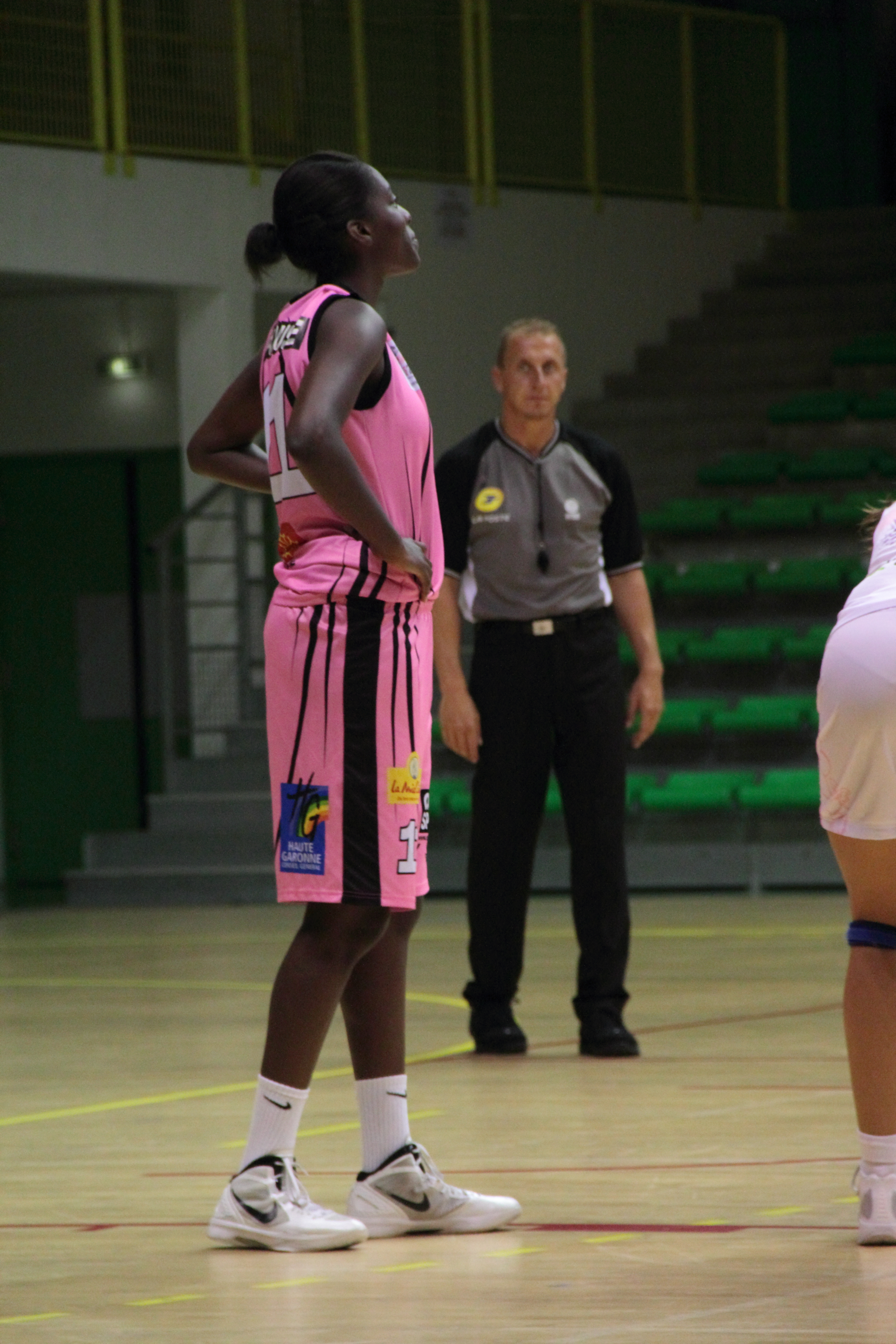
Friendly women's basketball match between Toulouse Métropole Basket and Tarbes Gespe Bigorre.

Maud Medenou (born 5 October 1990 in Évry, Essonne) is a French basketball player who plays for Toulouse Métropole Basket of the Ligue Féminine de Basketball.
