= David Tebili =

French footballer (born 2005)

Personal information
- Full name: David Tebili Koukougnon
- Date of birth: 15 February 2005 (age 21)
- Place of birth: Évry, France
- Position: Striker

Team information
- Current team: Troyes B

Youth career
- 2012–2018: FC Courcouronnes
- 2018–2020: Fleury
- 2020–2023: Bordeaux

Senior career*
Years	Team	Apps	(Gls)
2022–2024	Bordeaux B	42	(9)
2023–2024	Bordeaux	4	(0)
2024–	Troyes B	5	(2)

International career
2022	France U17	2	(0)
- * Club domestic league appearances and goals as of 7 December 2024

David Tebili Koukougnon (born 15 February 2005) is a French professional footballer who plays as a striker for Championnat National 3 club Troyes B.

== Club career ==
Prior to joining Bordeaux, Tebili came through FC Courcouronnes, Fleury, and INF Clairefontaine. In April 2023, he received his first call-up to the senior Bordeaux team for a match against Bastia. He eventually made his professional debut in a 3–0 Ligue 2 win over Grenoble on 24 April 2023. On 22 August 2023, Tebili signed his first professional contract, a deal until June 2026.

== International career ==
Tebili is a France youth international. He received his first call-up to the under-17s in April 2022, making his debut in a 4–1 defeat to Spain.

== Personal life ==
Born in France, Tebili is of Ivorian descent. He holds both French and Ivorian citizenship.
