= Courcouronnes =

Commune in Essonne, France

- Part of Évry-Courcouronnes
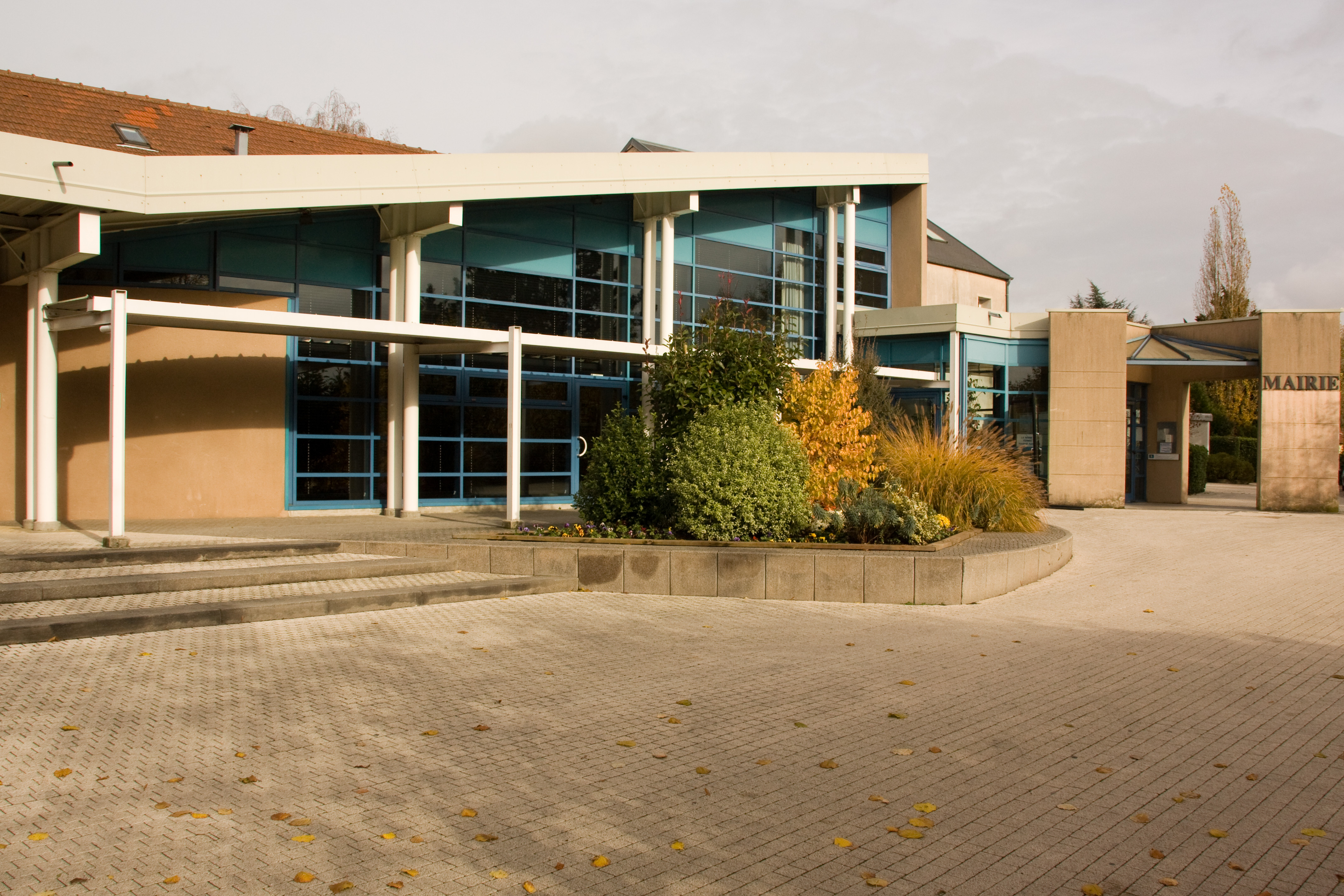
- The town hall of Courcouronnes

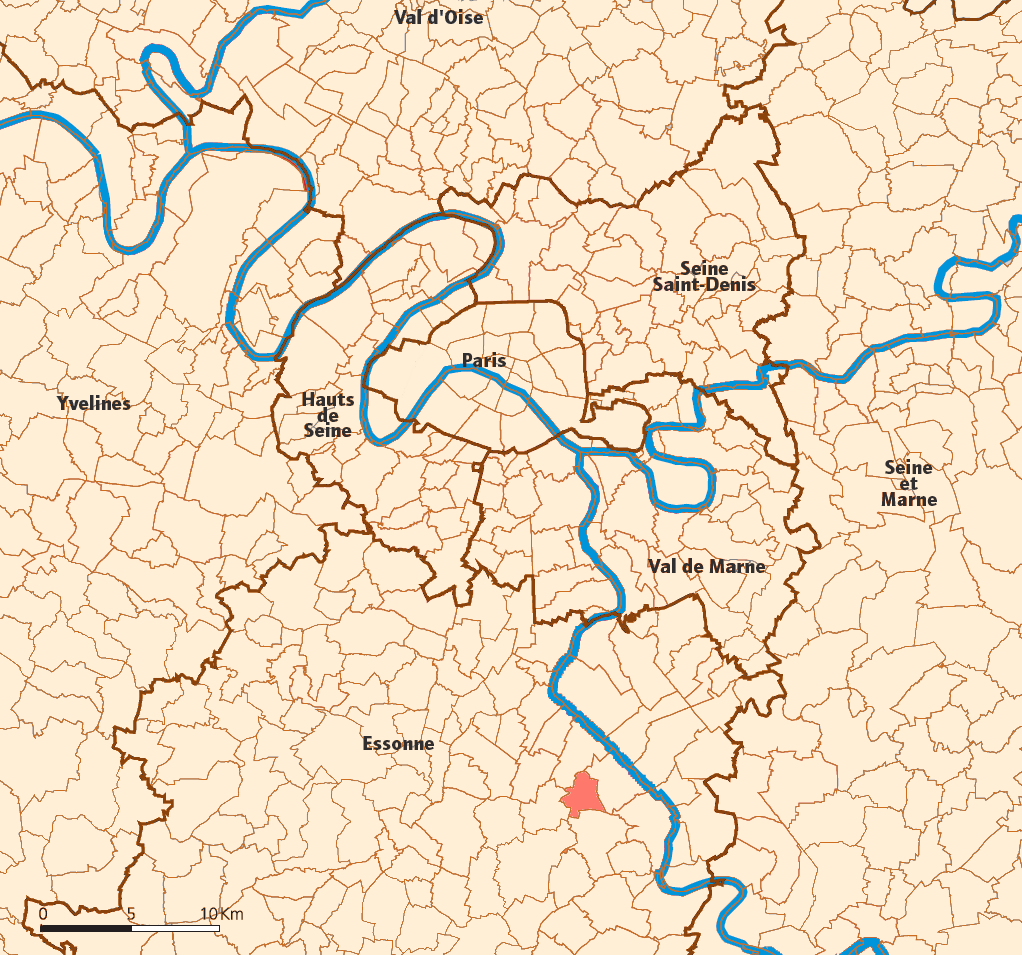
- Location (in red) within Paris inner and outer suburbs
- Location of Courcouronnes
- Location within France Location within Île-de-France (region)
- Coordinates: 48°37′02″N 2°24′31″E
- Country: France
- Region: Île-de-France
- Department: Essonne
- Arrondissement: Évry
- Canton: Évry-Courcouronnes
- Commune: Évry-Courcouronnes
- Area^{1}: 4.37 km^{2} (1.69 sq mi)
- Highest elevation: 96 m (315 ft)
- Lowest elevation: 77 m (253 ft)
- Population (2018): 13,490
  - Density: 3,090/km^{2} (8,000/sq mi)
- Time zone: UTC+01:00 (CET)
  - Summer (DST): UTC+02:00 (CEST)
- Postal code: 91080
- ^{1} French Land Register data, which excludes lakes, ponds, glaciers > 1 km^{2} (0.386 sq mi or 247 acres) and river estuaries.

Courcouronnes (French pronunciation: [kuʁkuʁɔn]) is a former commune in the southern suburbs of Paris, France. On 1 January 2019, it was merged into the new commune Évry-Courcouronnes. It is located 26.4 km (16.4 mi) from the centre of Paris, in the "new town" of Évry Ville Nouvelle, created in the 1960s.

== History ==
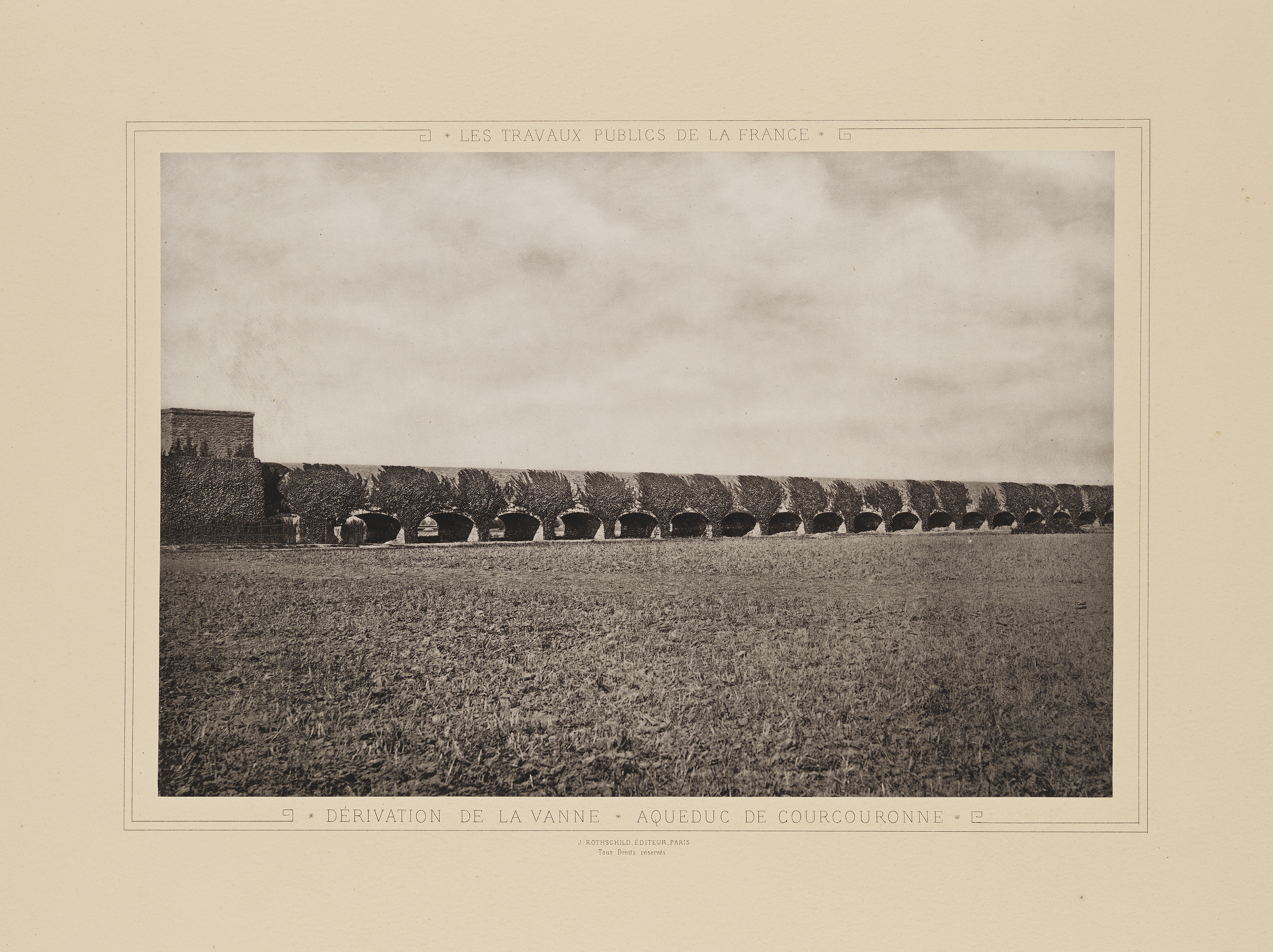
Aqueduct of Courcouronnes

A 19th century aqueduct, which brings drinking water from the rivers Vanne and Loing to the city of Paris, crosses the outskirts of Courcouronnes.

== Economy ==
Arianespace, a commercial company that sells the Ariane rockets, is based there. Carrefour's Hypermarket division is based in the city.

Accor was formerly headquartered in Courcouronnes.

== Education ==
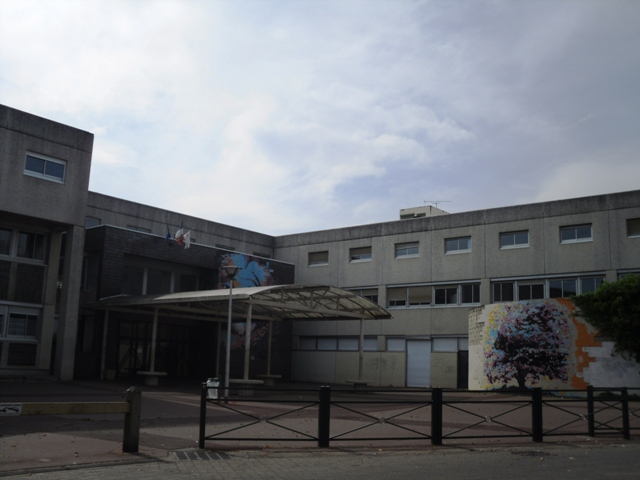
Lycée Georges Brassens

There are the following schools:

- Six primary schools: Jules Ferry, Paul Bert, Vincent van Gogh, Paul Gauguin, Jacques Brel, and Jacques Tati - Another school, Ecole Frédéric Mistral, is in nearby Lisses
- Collège Paul Fort, a junior high school
- Lycée Georges Brassens, a senior high school/sixth-form college

== Parks and recreation ==
Parc-du-Lac Courcouronnes is a relatively large park with a walking trail and a small lake. It is home to the famous "Dame du Lac" climbing wall constructed by architect Pierre Skelezy in 1975. The wall has long since been closed to the public, however trespassers continue to use it regularly. The wall was made famous by its appearance in television broadcasts about the sport of Parkour, which was developed in Lisses and Évry-Courcouronnes by David Belle.

== See also ==
- Communes of the Essonne department
