= Lycée Georges Brassens (Évry-Courcouronnes) =

Senior high school in France

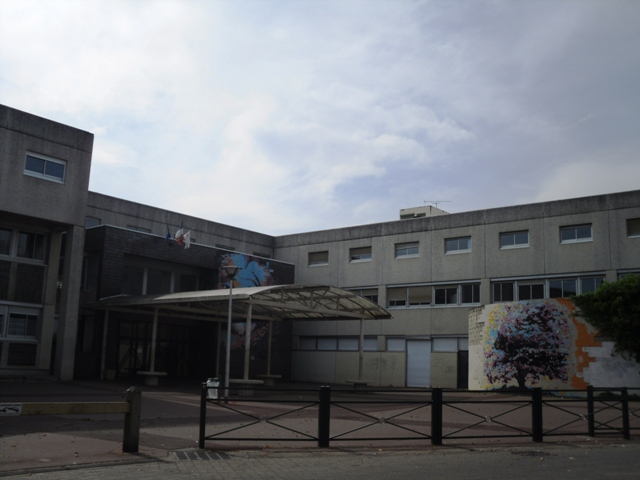
High school building

Lycée Georges Brassens is a senior high school/sixth-form college in Évry-Courcouronnes, Essonne, France, in the Paris metropolitan area. Serving the Évry area, it first opened in 1983.

The school property, with a total area of 23,473 square metres (252,660 sq ft), has three buildings, A, B, and C, and all of the buildings together occupy 9,909 square metres (106,660 sq ft) of space. An additional 5,905 square metres (63,560 sq ft) of space is recreational area, and 7,606 square metres (81,870 sq ft) is green space; the total size of the non-building areas of the school property is 13,565 square metres (146,010 sq ft).
