= Grand Mosque of Évry =

Mosque in Évry-Courcouronnes, Essonne, France

- Grande Mosquée d'Évry
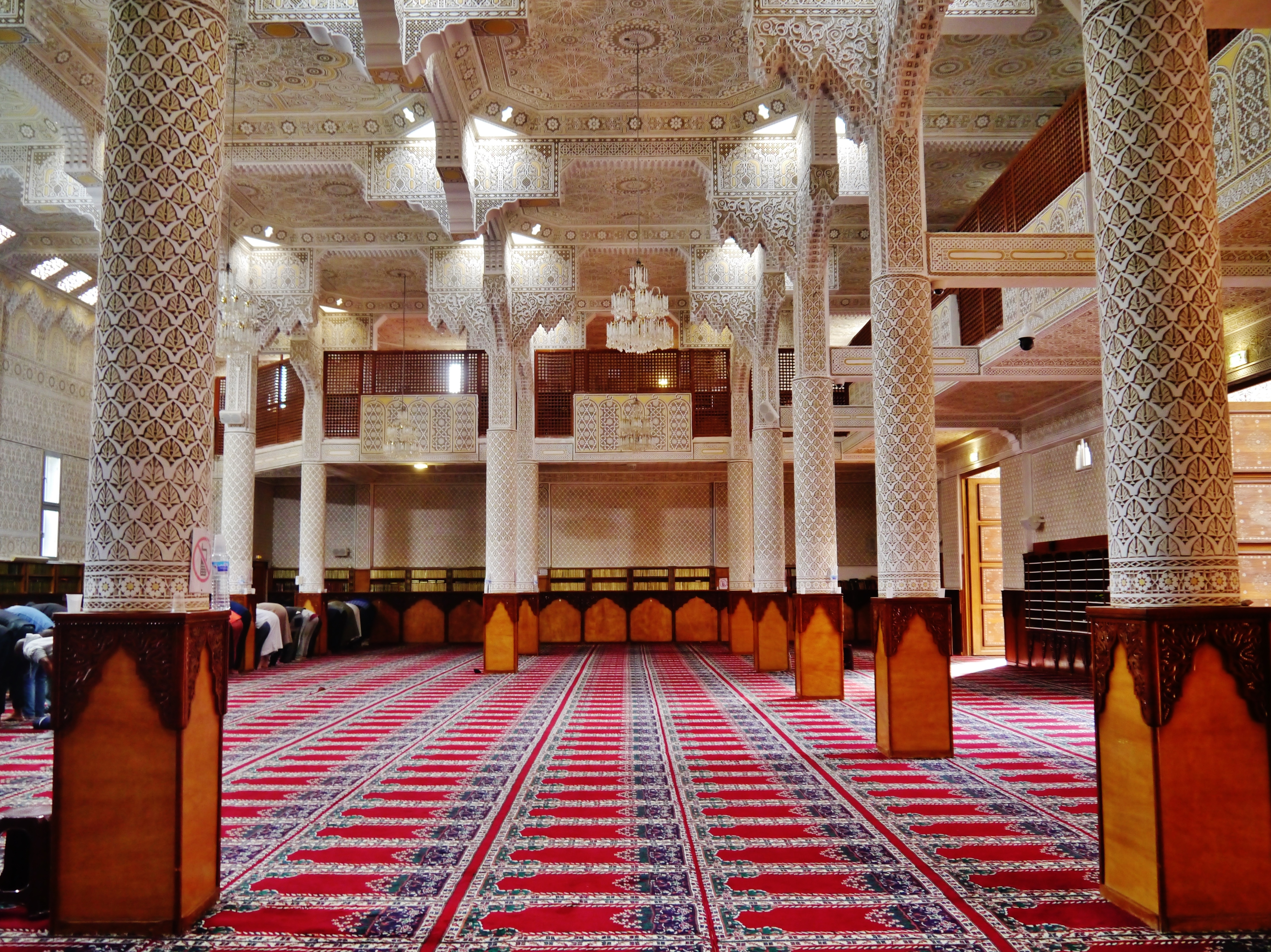

- Location of the mosque in France

Religion
- Affiliation: Islam
- Ecclesiastical or organizational status: Mosque
- Status: Active

Location
- Location: Évry-Courcouronnes, Essonne
- Country: France
- Interactive map of Grand Mosque of Évry
- Coordinates: 48°37′34″N 2°25′18″E

Architecture
- Type: Mosque
- Completed: 1995

Specifications
- Capacity: 5,000 worshippers
- Minaret: 1

Website
- mosquee-evry.fr/modules/news/ (in French)

The Grand Mosque of Évry (French: Grande Mosquée d'Évry) is a mosque in Évry-Courcouronnes, Essonne, France. A cultural center is associated with the building.

== History ==
A process was initiated in the early 1980s to collect funds to build the mosque in Évry. The modest results of this effort led to a search for additional funding from the Persian Gulf states. The Saudi Sheikh Akram Aadja saw to it that the financing was completed. The first stone was laid in 1984, and construction work began in 1985. Interior decoration was funded by the Hassan II Foundation.

The mosque opened ten years later, in 1995, the same year as the Évry Cathedral. It was the work of the architect Henri Baudot, who has constructed several buildings in Algeria and Tunisia.

== See also ==
- Islam in France
- List of mosques in France
