= Évry, Essonne =

Évry
- Part of Évry-Courcouronnes
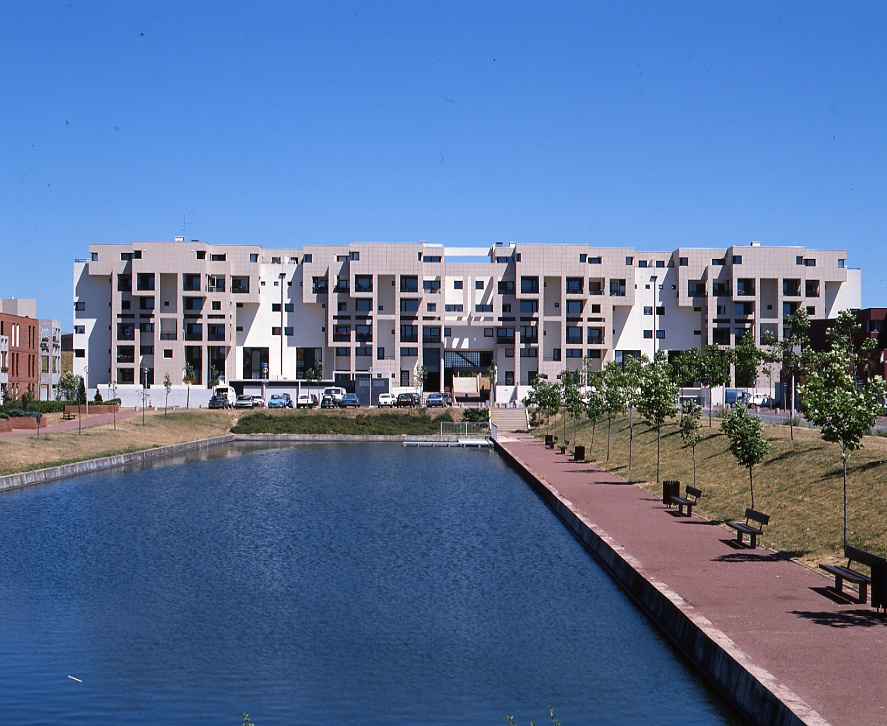
- Évry in 1986

- Coat of arms

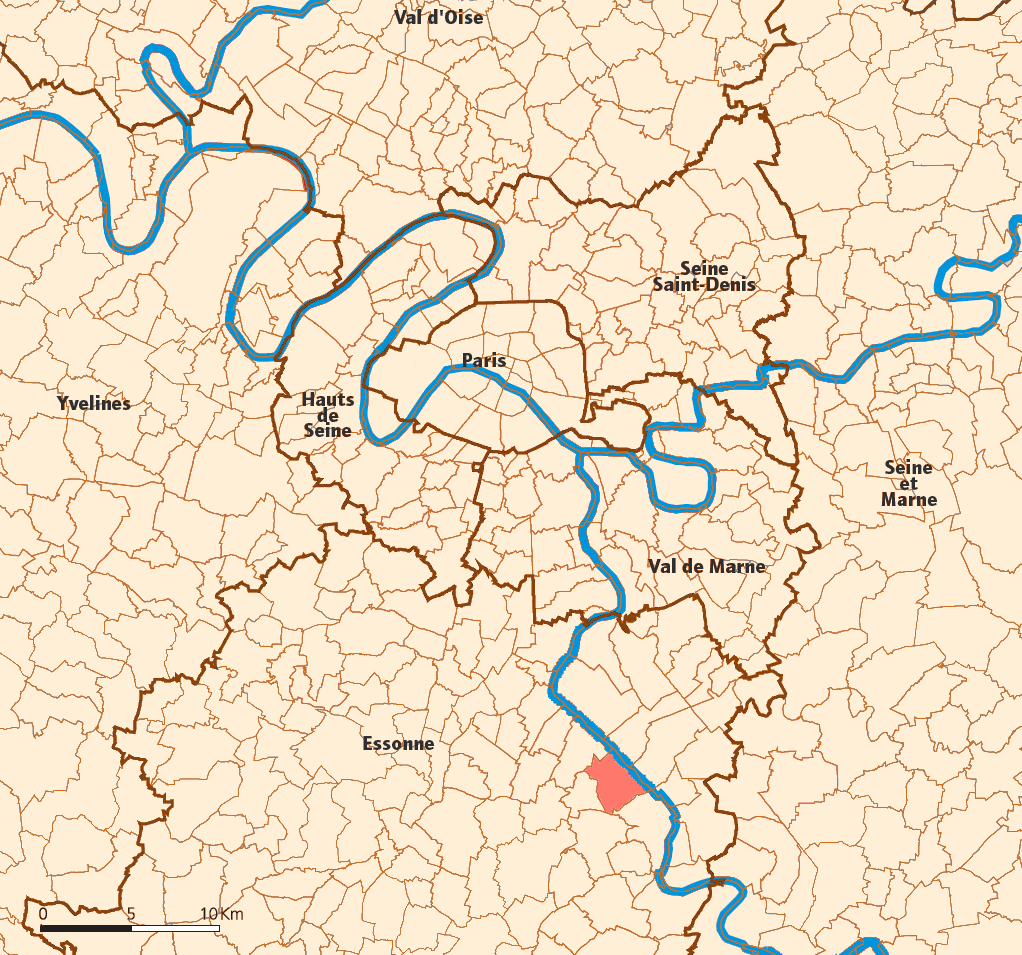
- Location (in red) within Paris inner and outer suburbs
- Location of Évry
- Location within France Location within Île-de-France (region)
- Coordinates: 48°37′26″N 2°25′47″E
- Country: France
- Region: Île-de-France
- Department: Essonne
- Arrondissement: Évry
- Canton: Évry-Courcouronnes
- Commune: Évry-Courcouronnes
- Area^{1}: 8.33 km^{2} (3.22 sq mi)
- Elevation: 53 m (174 ft)
- Highest elevation: 95 m (312 ft)
- Lowest elevation: 32 m (105 ft)
- Population (2018): 53,641
  - Density: 6,440/km^{2} (16,700/sq mi)
- Time zone: UTC+01:00 (CET)
  - Summer (DST): UTC+02:00 (CEST)
- Postal code: 91000
- ^{1} French Land Register data, which excludes lakes, ponds, glaciers > 1 km^{2} (0.386 sq mi or 247 acres) and river estuaries.

Évry (French pronunciation: [evʁi]) is a former commune in the southern suburbs of Paris, France, prefecture of the department of Essonne. On 1 January 2019, it was merged into the new commune Évry-Courcouronnes.

It is located 25.0 km (15.5 mi; 13.5 nmi) from the center of Paris, in the "new town" of Évry Ville Nouvelle, created in the 1960s, of which it is the central and most populated commune.

Significant nearby communes include Courcouronnes, Corbeil-Essonnes, Ris-Orangis, Brétigny-sur-Orge, and Draveil.

== Name ==
Originally the commune was called Évry-sur-Seine (meaning "Évry upon Seine"). The name "Évry" comes from the Gallic name Eburacon or Eburiacos, meaning "land of Eburos" (a Gallic patronym), perhaps the leader of a Gallic tribe in the area before the conquest of Gaul by the Romans. After the conquest, the name was corrupted into Latin Apriacum, then Medieval Latin Avriacum, and later Evriacum.

In 1881 the name of the commune was changed into Évry-Petit-Bourg at the request of entrepreneur Paul Decauville, owner of Ateliers de Petit-Bourg, a large boiler works located in Évry and at the time the largest employer in the area. The factory owed its name to the hamlet of Petit-Bourg (one of the three hamlets on the territory of Évry) where it was built.

On 29 June 1965 the name of the commune was shortened into "Évry" only. Évry had just been chosen to become a "new town" of the suburbs of Paris, destined to host tens of thousands of suburbanites, and so the name "Petit-Bourg" (literally meaning "little borough, small town" in modern French, although etymologists think that this name was in fact the corruption of an old Gallic word with a totally different meaning) was deemed too old fashioned and improper for the new large suburban city of Évry to be built.

== History ==
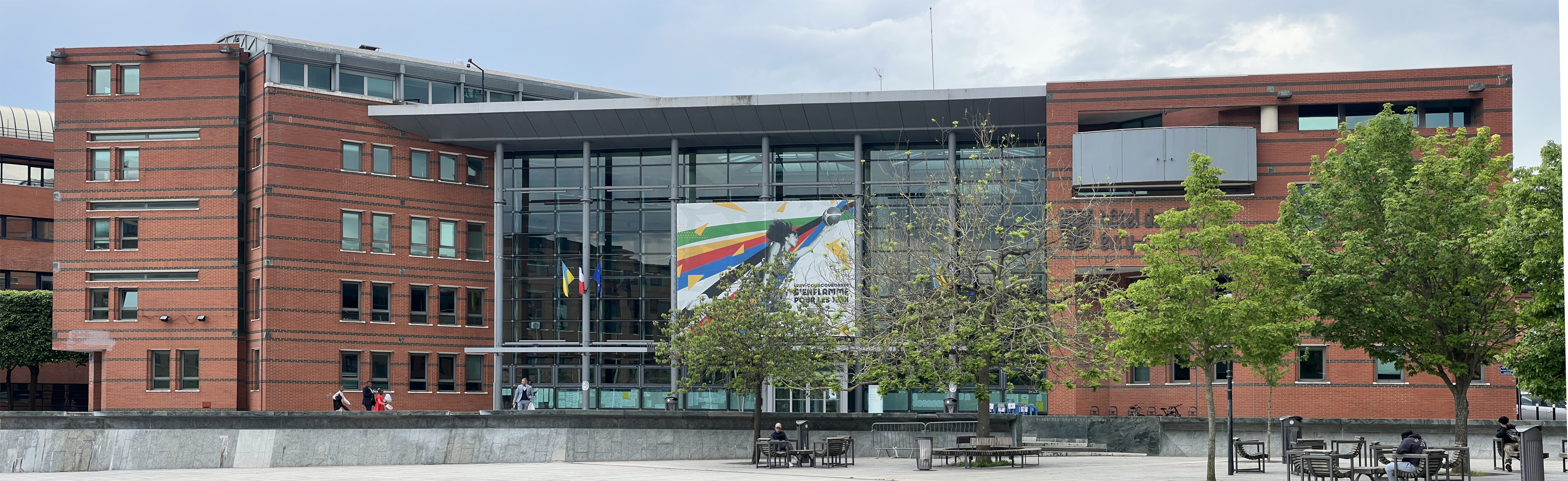
The Hôtel de Ville

In 1965 Évry became part of the French new town initiative and took its current name. Before then it was known as "Évry-Petit-Bourg" and had a population of only a few thousand.

When Évry was built, Orly was the primary international airport of France, and many international companies, such as Digital, Hewlett-Packard, and Alstom, established their head offices in Évry. However, with the expansion of Charles de Gaulle Roissy airport, all the larger companies have moved out, causing the downfall of the many smaller service companies which catered to the lunchtime needs of the thousands of staff who were either displaced or made redundant.

The town has tried to counteract this exodus by increasing the capacity of the commercial center, the Agora, to 235 shops, mostly selling the same wares (54 ready-made women's wear, 14 shoe shops, 28 men's wear, 13 children's wear, 15 jewellers, 9 mobile phone shops, 9 opticians, and 19 restaurants and snack bars). The economy of the Agora has also been hit by the recession. A total of 29 shops and one restaurant are vacant. 24 are on the upper level where the rents are almost double that of the lower level shops. During the week the car parks are now "pay by the hour" to discourage rail commuters from saturating the parking space during the day to the detriment of shoppers. Weekend parking is free.

Another measure taken by the local authorities has been to declare certain quarters a "zone franche" which means that businesses starting up in these areas are exempt from corporation tax along with many other social benefits and aids which makes Évry an attractive town for future entrepreneurs. Modern buildings in the town centre included the Hôtel de Ville which was completed in 1991.

The Cathedral of the Resurrection, dedicated to Saint Corbinien, is one of the few 20th-century cathedrals built in a truly modern style (see also Coventry Cathedral Basil Spence 1962, Liverpool Metropolitan Cathedral Frederick Gibberd 1967). The total cost was 13.72M€. The total surface is 1,600 m^{2}, and it is 34 m high. It can receive 1,400 people. It was completed in 1995 and Pope John Paul II made a visit on 22 August 1997.

In 2003, the Socialist mayor, Manuel Valls (born 13 August 1962, in Barcelona, Catalonia, Spain, French nationality by naturalisation in 1982), and who is also the constituency deputé (Member of Parliament) and a qualified avocat (barrister), embarked upon a massive safeguard plan designed to entirely renovate the more defavourised areas which includes much demolition of the obsolete 1960s buildings (especially in the "Pyramides" quarter, once the French equivalent of the Gorbals), and the upgrading of the more recent residential structures and schools. 2006 saw the final renovation of the Collège des Pyramides at the cost of 11.43M€ (the price of a new school) and will receive 571 pupils. In 2007, enlargement and renovation was to begin on the Lycée des Loges. The work was to last three years without interruption of lessons, and the budget was set at 40M€. Demolition of several buildings in the Jules Vallès quarter of the Pyramides is in progress. They will be replaced by "low level" blocks of appartements. At the same time, the university residence is being renovated along with the construction of a "mall" which will eventually link the northern limit of the town with the town centre in preparation for when the tramway will provide a direct transport to Paris as an alternative to the RER railway.

On 31 January 2006, in the Sénat during the 14th ceremony of the "Prix du Trombinoscope 2005" (press awards), Manuel Valls was elected "Local Representative of the Year". With the heavy defeat of the Socialists on the national scale during the 2007 elections, Manuel Valls has taken a prominent position in the party and has been given the nickname of "Le Sarko de la gauche" (the left wing Sarkozy).

During the 2008 municipal elections, Manuel Valls was returned to office as mayor on the first round with 70.3% of the vote, which gave him the highest national score for a first-round ballot, making Evry the safest Socialist commune in France. During his first national presentation as a presidential candidate during the Socialist primary elections of 9 October 2011, Manuel Valls won 5.63% of the vote.

The 3 June 2012 saw an exceptional reunion of the town council where Manuel Valls resigned as mayor after being nominated as Minister of the Interior in the new Socialist government. Amongst the personalities present were Jacques Guyard, former mayor, Jean-Pierre Caffet, senator, and Lionel Jospin, former prime minister. The first adjoint, Francis Chouat, became the new mayor. The place of first adjoint is now held by Pacôme Adjourouvi who was born and grew up in the defavourised Pyramides sector and is now an avocat at the tribunal of Evry.

== Demographics ==
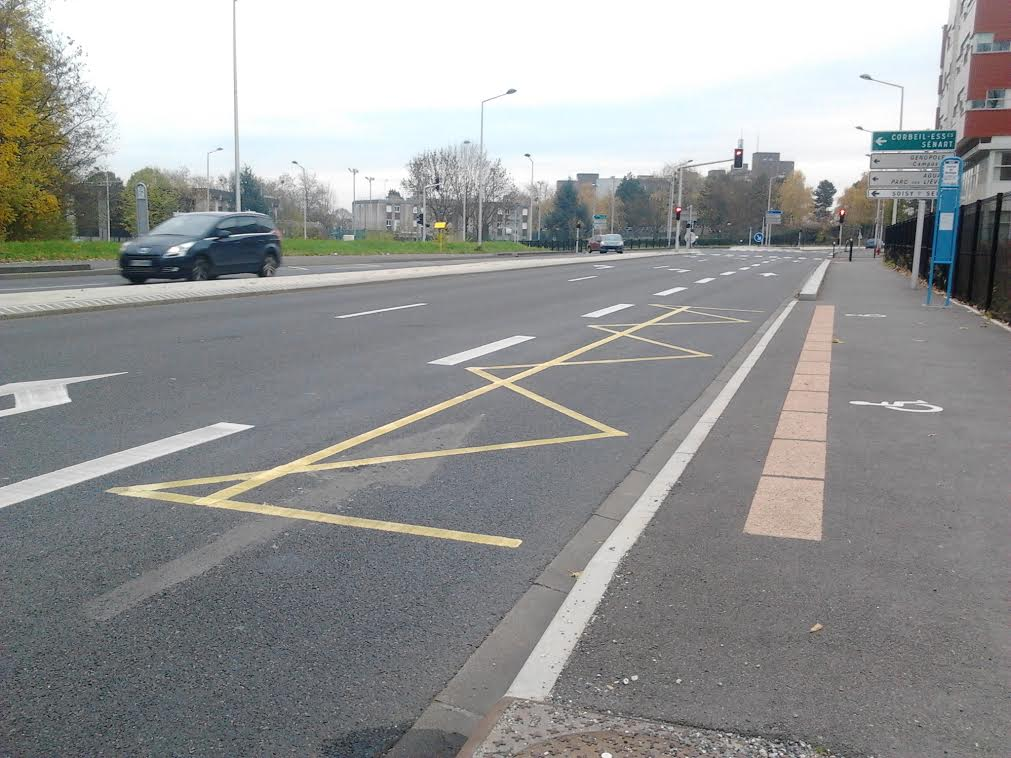
Rue des Mazières

Évry is demographically the second youngest town in France, with the average age of the population only 26 years. (Recently beaten by Mulhouse with an average age of 24 years.) On 9 September 2011, 7,000 children began a new academic year in the town's 42 schools with eight supplementary classes added. Over 3,300 meals are served daily in the school canteens, and the town has spent €10 million on education. Not including teaching staff, 350 auxiliaries are employed looking after the 3- to 11-year-old children, along with seven staff specialised in sport.

At the other end of the age span, Évry has only three residences for the elderly, and the cemetery, proportionally small compared to towns with similar a population figure, is closed to further inhumations. Burials are now carried out at the Garenne cemetery in nearby Courcouronnes where a crematorium has also recently been built.

Five paediatricians are established in Évry along with paediatric units in the hospital and in the two private clinics, whereas no funeral parlours or morticians exist in the town of Évry.

=== Immigration ===
Place of birth of residents of Évry in 1999
Born in metropolitan France	Born outside metropolitan France			
74.7%	25.3%			
74.7%	Born in overseas France	Born in foreign countries with French citizenship at birth^{1}	EU-15 immigrants^{2}	Non-EU-15 immigrants
74.7%	4.0%	3.4%	2.4%	15.5%
^{1} This group is made up largely of former French settlers, such as pieds-noirs in Northwest Africa, followed by former colonial citizens who had French citizenship at birth (such as was often the case for the native elite in French colonies), as well as to a lesser extent foreign-born children of French expatriates. A foreign country is understood as a country not part of France in 1999, so a person born for example in 1950 in Algeria, when Algeria was an integral part of France, is nonetheless listed as a person born in a foreign country in French statistics.^{2} An immigrant is a person born in a foreign country not having French citizenship at birth. An immigrant may have acquired French citizenship since moving to France, but is still considered an immigrant in French statistics. On the other hand, persons born in France with foreign citizenship (the children of immigrants) are not listed as immigrants.

== Administration ==
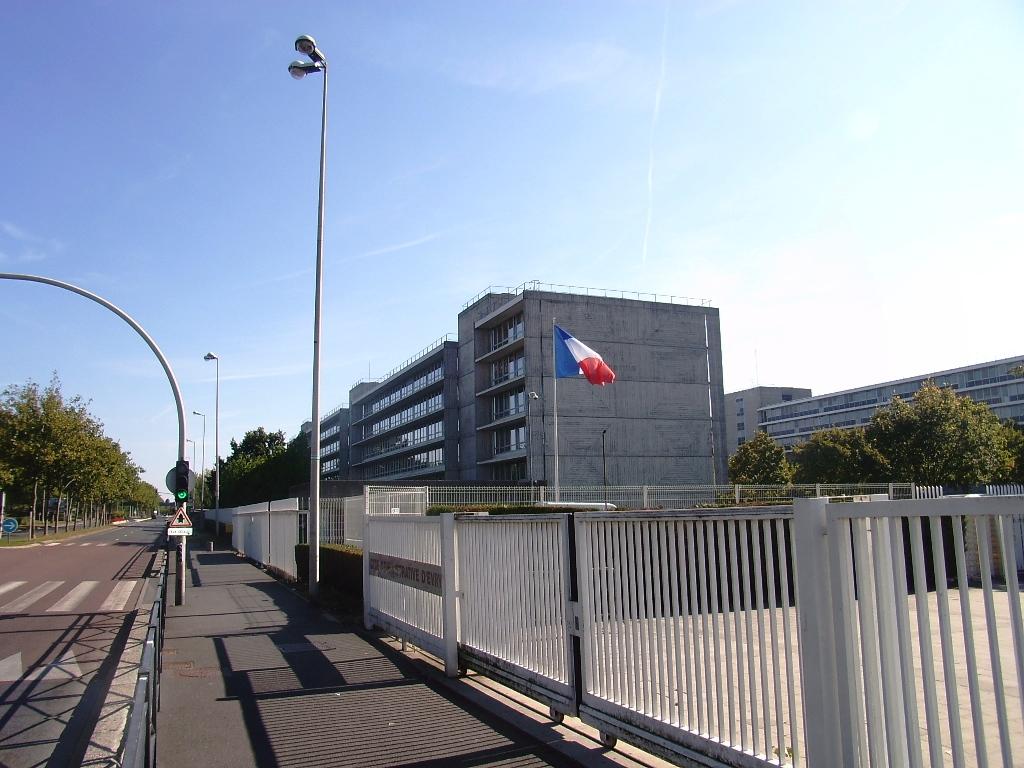
Préfecture building of the Essonne department in Évry

Évry is the préfecture (capital) of the Essonne département. It is also the official seat of the arrondissement of Évry, although in reality the sous-préfecture buildings and administration are located in the neighboring commune of Corbeil-Essonnes.

Évry is the seat of the canton of Évry-Courcouronnes, which consists of the commune of Évry-Courcouronnes.

== Transport ==
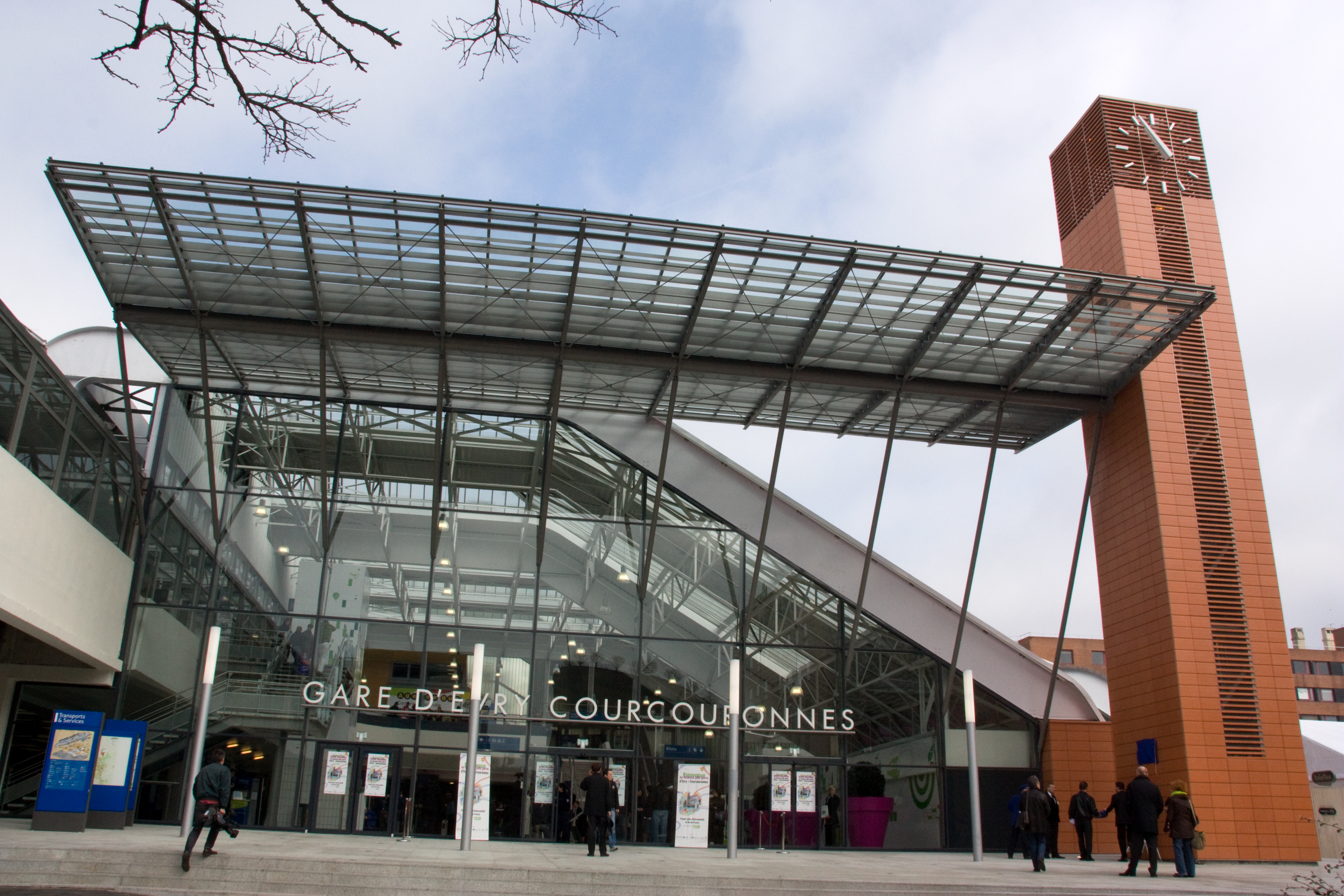
Évry-Courcouronnes station

The regional rapid transit RER line D forks just south of Évry into two branches, encircling Évry and the commune of Ris-Orangis before merging into one right-of-way again 11 kilometres (6.8 mi) north of the fork. Évry is served by three stations along the two branches: Évry-Val-de-Seine, Évry-Courcouronnes, and Le Bras-de-Fer. The line that serves the station Évry-Courcouronnes and Le Bras-de-Fer was built at the same time as the new town.

The town is bordered to the west by the A6 motorway, south by the National 104, and the National 7 running north to south divides the town in two. The Seine marks the eastern limit of the town. A new port has recently been built to accommodate an increase in barge traffic.

The local bus network is served by Tice operator, including lines 401, 402, 403 and 453, 404, 405, 407, 408, 414, 414D and 415. By night, Noctilien can be taken from Evry to Villeneuve-Saint-Georges station with line N135 and to Paris-Est station with line N144. Both stations are also deserved by the RER.

== Economy ==
Accor and Arianespace have their former headquarters and headquarters, respectively, in Courcouronnes, near Évry. Carrefour's Hypermarket division has its head office in Courcouronnes, near Évry.

== Education ==
As of 2016 the commune has 42 schools with 7,200 students.

The commune has six junior high schools:

- Collège des Pyramides
- Collège Galilée
- Collège Le Village
- Collège Montesquieu
- Collège Paul Éluard

Senior high schools:

- Lycée Auguste Perret
- Lycée Charles Baudelaire
- Lycée du Parc des Loges

Lycée François Truffaut is in nearby Bondoufle, Lycée Pierre Mendès France is in nearby Ris-Orangis, Lycée Georges Brassens is in nearby Courcouronnes, and Lycée Robert Doisneau is in nearby Corbeil-Essonnes.

Private schools

- Collège-Lycée Notre-Dame-De-Sion

University:

- University of Évry Val d'Essonne

Grande école:

- École nationale supérieure d'informatique pour l'industrie et l'entreprise
- Telecom Business School
- Télécom SudParis

== Religion ==
Évry has the following religious edifices (in descending order of attendance):

- Grand Mosque of Évry and Islamic Centre (largest in France).
- Cathedral of the Resurrection
- Church of Jesus Christ of Latter-day Saints (Mormons)
- Evangelist Centre (Protestant)
- Adventist Church
- Parish church of St Peter & St Paul (extremely rare 12th century building oriented north–south instead of east/west)
- Synagogue
- Notre Dame de l'Esperance
- Convent of Notre Dame de Sion

There is also a very strong presence of Jehovah's Witnesses in Évry, with a new Kingdom Hall on the Route Nationale 7 nearly opposite the pagoda.

The Grand Mosque of Évry with its 5,525 m^{2} is one of the largest in Europe, and is of Moroccan architecture. The minaret is 25 m tall. It has a large prayer room and can accommodate a total of 5.000 people. The construction of the mosque was mostly funded by King Fahd of Saudi Arabia and the interior decoration by the Moroccan king Hassan II. The total cost was €6.8 million. Although the true story of the kidnapping and death of Ben Barka is still a mystery, many people believe he is buried either under the mosque or in the nearby forest of La Garenne.

The Khanh-Anh Pagoda completed in 2015 is the largest Buddhist temple in Europe (3,287 m^{2}) and can accommodate 1,500 people. The initial cost was estimated at €7.6 million, mostly funded by the Vietnamese community, but is expected to have doubled by the end of the construction. Work began in 1996 and is yet to be completed. The statue of Buddha, 4 metres tall and weighing 5 tons, arrived from Thailand on 20 October 2002. The pagoda will be the headquarters of the European Buddhist Congregation and will be a training school for future monks and nuns. The Dalai Lama consecrated the edifice on 12 August 2008. He made a speech in English which was translated by interpreters into French and Vietnamese. 1,500 adepts were admitted into the grounds coming from as far away as Canada, but only 500 visitors watched the ceremony on a giant screen erected in the nearby park.

== Parks and recreation ==
Parc-du-Lac Courcouronnes is a relatively large park with a walking trail and a small lake, located in Evry-Courcouronnes. It is home to the famous "Dame du Lac", a very large climbing wall constructed by architect Pierre Skelezy in 1975.

== Political activity ==
The following political parties have a permanent base in Évry:

- French Communist Party
- Radical Party of the Left
- Parti Socialiste
- UDF
- UMP
- Groupe des Verts
- Groupe "Défi pour Évry"
- Groupe "Nous, Citoyens d'Évry"

== Miscellaneous ==
The composer Gioachino Rossini had a country residence in Évry to be near his friend Edmond de Goncourt, who lived on the opposite bank of the Seine in Draveil. It was here that he wrote the greater part of his opera The Barber of Seville.

On 16 November 1943, Resistance fighter Missak Manouchian was arrested during a gun battle on the banks of the Seine, a few hundred yards from Évry railway station after his group had been outnumbered. A memorial marks the exact place where he was arrested. Towards the end of the war, General Patton crossed the Seine with his tanks at Évry en route from Avranches going towards the east. The anniversary of the liberation of Évry on 23 August 1944, is celebrated annually at the Patton Memorial. Note: Although there is a plaque at the site where the US Army crossed the Seine at Évry Petit Bourg claiming that General Patton crossed the Seine at this site, the claim that Patton crossed here is incorrect. Units of Patton's 3rd Army crossed the Seine south of Paris on Aug 26, 1944 at Sens and Troyes, 20-30 mi south of Évry. The pontoon bridge at Évry Petit Bourg was constructed on Aug 26, 1944 by the 238th Engineer Combat Battalion, part of the US VII Corps under Gen. J. Lawton Collins, US First Army (Gen. Courtney Hodges). The tanks that crossed at Évry belonged to the 3d Armored Division of the US First Army, not Patton's 3d Army.

Although Évry is a modern "new town", which is generally synonymous with "concrete jungle", 50% of its surface area is parkland and open space. The main thoroughfares are very wide avenues, and trees are to be found everywhere. In the nationwide intercommunal competition "Ville Fleurie" (flowered town) Évry has been awarded the high status of "3 flowers", usually won by country villages. To encourage this aspect of the town an annual "Balcon Fleuri" (flowered balcony) competition is held. A similar balcony competition is held each December for the best exterior Christmas decorations.

Some people consider the modern cathedral as an architectural beauty while others liken the design to that of a blast furnace.

Évry is the home of the European space project Ariane, at the Centre National d'Études Spatiales (CNES).

== Notable personalities ==
- Maud Medenou, basketball player
- Aurélien Ngeyitala, footballer
- Clement Parisse, cross-country skier
- Niska, rapper
- Koba LaD, rapper
- David Tebili, footballer

== Twinnings ==
Évry is twinned with the London Borough of Bexley in England. This is because, originally, Évry was designed to be a predominantly management and executive class town.

Évry is also twinned with Nowy Targ in Poland, Troisdorf in Germany, Estelí in Nicaragua, and Repentigny in Quebec, Canada.

The Agglomération d'Évry has twinning pacts with Kayes in Mali and Khan Younis in the Gaza Strip. (Maison du Monde, 509, Patio des Terrasses, Évry, sharing the address with a branch of Amnesty International.)

The latest addition to the overseas contacts is a "parrainage" (godfather) pact with Bozovici in Romania.

== Sports ==
Several évryens clubs illustrated in various disciplines such as AS Evry in football (soccer) who played in the third division national league and the Paris Île-de-France, the Corsairs of Evry in American football. evolving into a second division championship and sometimes national French elite; the Peaux Rouges in ice hockey who play in the third national division, and the North South Viry Evry Essonne athletics.

The town regularly hosts national meetings such as the French Dance Federation in 1981. Being city-stage of the Tour de France in 2001, it was also bid to host the Grand Prix of France.

In June 2012, the French Rugby Federation (FFR) announced that the now-closed Ris-Orangis horse racing track in Évry had been chosen as the site for a proposed new stadium for the national rugby union team. The new ground was intended to feature 82,000 seats, a retractable roof, and a slide-out pitch, and was to be at the center of a 133-hectare shopping and entertainment complex. Plans originally called for the stadium to open in 2017, but FFR abandoned the project in December 2016 after numerous delays.

== See also ==
- University of Évry Val d'Essonne
- Télécom SudParis
- Telecom Business School
