= Jacques Guyard =

French politician

Member of the French Parliament for Essonne's 2nd constituency
- In office 1981–1986

Member of the French Parliament for Essonne's 1st constituency
- In office 1988–1991, 1993–2002

mayor of Évry
- In office 1983–1999

Personal details
- Born: 19 November 1937 (age 87) Paris, France
- Political party: Socialist Party

Jacques Guyard (born 19 November 1937 in the 6th arrondissement of Paris) is a French politician. A member of the Socialist Party, he was secretary of state for technical education, deputy for the second and then first constituencies of Essonne and mayor of Évry.

== Biography ==
=== Origins and family life ===
Jacques Guyard was born in Paris on November 19, 1937.

=== Education and training ===
He entered the École normale d'instituteurs in 1953, which enabled him to prepare for the entrance exam to the École normale supérieure at the Lycée Chaptal. Winner of the IPES examination, he obtained the agrégation d'histoire in 1962. In 1972, he defended his post-graduate thesis in history.

=== Professional career and union involvement ===
A teacher at the Lycée de Châlons-sur-Marne in 1962, then at the Lycée Arago in Paris, he was appointed assistant professor at the Sorbonne in 1968, then lecturer in history at the University of Paris I.

Jacques Guyard's first commitments were to the trade unions. A member of the Syndicat national des instituteurs when he entered the Ecole Normale, he became active in the Syndicat national de l'enseignement secondaire from 1958 onwards, and became the union's national secretary responsible for “youth categories” in 1962.

A member of the "autonomous" tendency, he sat on the national administrative commission of the new Syndicat national des enseignements de second degré, created in 1966, and thus found himself in the minority. Moving to the Syndicat National de l'Enseignement Supérieur in 1970, he sat on its national bodies from 1970 to 1972.

In 1973, he supported the initiative taken by socialist militants close to the CERES to form a "unity and renovation" tendency within the SNES, intended to organize the reconquest of the union's majority, which had passed to the "unity and action" current in 1967.

=== Political career ===
A member of the Convention des Institutions Républicaines (Convention of Republican Institutions), he joined the new Socialist Party in 1970 and became part of the CERES movement, led by Jean-Pierre Chevènement. First secretary of the Paris federation of the Socialist Party from 1971 to 1974, he then devoted himself primarily to advancing his party's thinking in the field of education, notably within the "école et socialisme" group, whose regular newsletter he edited.

In 1974, at the same time as leaving Paris to settle in Évry, he broke with CERES and joined the Mitterrandist majority of the Socialist Party.

After a first defeat in the 1978 legislative elections, he was elected member of parliament for Essonne in 1981, and was subsequently constantly re-elected until 2002, when he did not stand for re-election. A municipal councillor in Évry in 1977, he was mayor of this "new town" from 1983 to 1999, and chaired the Syndicat d'Agglomération Nouvelle from 1977 to 1983, then from 1999 to 2000.

From 1991 to 1992, he was secretary of state for technical education.

He bid farewell to politics in 2002, leaving his seat as a deputy to the new mayor of Évry, Manuel Valls.

=== Detention ===
Jacques Guyard was indicted for corruption and influence peddling in the SAGES affair by Judge Renaud Van Ruymbeke in 1992, in connection with contracts awarded between this consultancy close to the Socialist Party and the commune of Évry, of which he was mayor, and for the same charges in the SANE affair by Judge Jean-Marie d'Huy in February 1995.

On March 21, 2000, he was sentenced by the Paris court to a 20,000 franc fine and 90,000 francs in damages for having described the anthroposophic movement as a cult without "serious investigation". He was acquitted on appeal in 2001, as the Court of Appeal ruled that, while the remarks in question were indeed "defamatory", Jacques Guyard was acting in "good faith" and "the judge is not bound by the conclusions of a Commission of Inquiry and cannot therefore pronounce on the quality of the investigations carried out by the investigator".

On May 9, 2000, he received a one-year suspended prison sentence for influence peddling in the SAGES case.

== Works ==
- Le miracle français. Paris: Le Seuil. 1965.
- Les Révolutions industrielles. L'ombre de l'argent. Saint-Cloud: Éditions du Burin-Martinsart. 1972.
- C'était en 1900 : Bondoufle, Courcouronnes, Évry, Lisses, Ris-Orangis. Paris: Association des éditeurs franco-genevois. 1985.
- 1789, 10 000 citoyens prennent la parole. Les cahiers de doléances de la région d’Évry-Corbeil. Paris: Association des éditeurs franco-genevois. 1988.
- Évry : ville nouvelle, 1960-2003 : la troisième banlieue. Évry: Espaces Sud. 2003.

He also contributed to the following works:

- Anticolonialistes et anti-esclavagistes : les défenseurs des droits de l'homme. Romorantin, Martinsart, Les Grands Révolutionnaires. 1978. (Georges Washington).
- Naissance d'une autre école. Paris: La Découverte. 1984.
- La réussite scolaire, un enjeu pour la ville. Paris: Association des éditeurs franco-genevois. 1989.
