= Canton of Évry-Courcouronnes =

Coordinates: 48.63°N 2.43°E

The canton of Évry-Courcouronnes (before 2021: Évry) is an administrative division of the Essonne department, Île-de-France region, northern France. It was created at the French canton reorganisation which came into effect in March 2015. Its seat is in Évry-Courcouronnes.

It consists of the commune of Évry-Courcouronnes.
