= Évry-Courcouronnes =

Prefecture and commune in Île-de-France, France

- Prefecture and commune
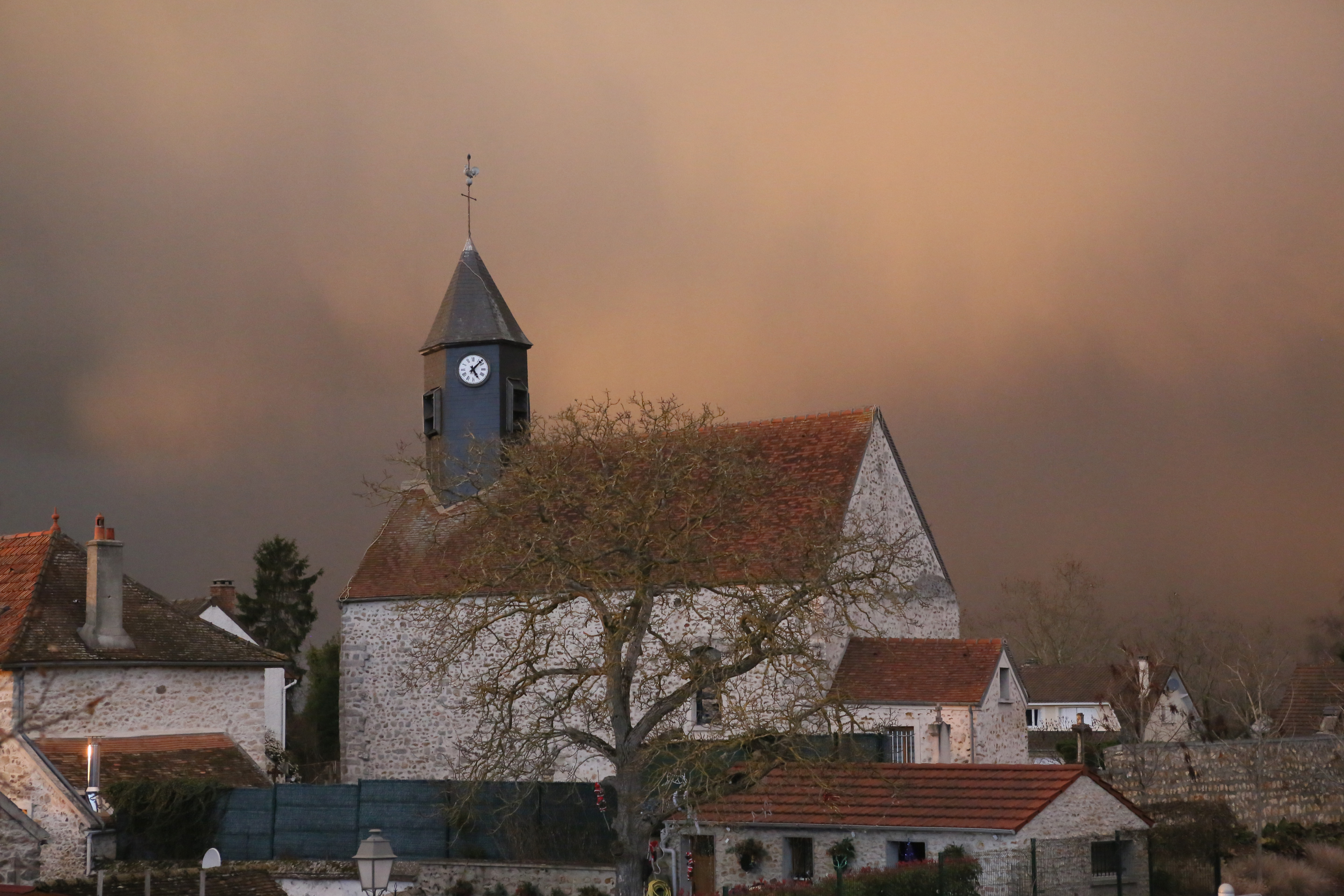
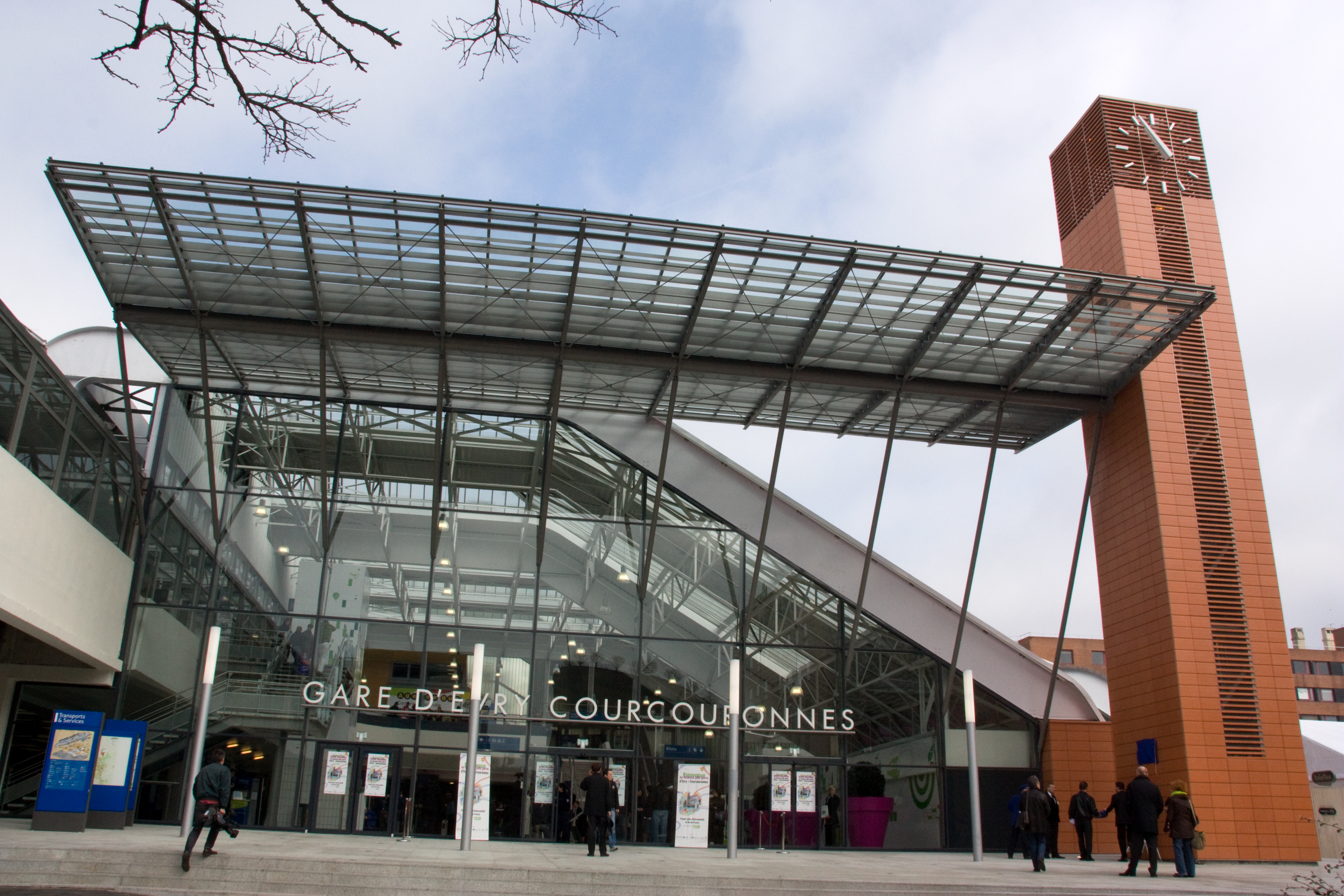
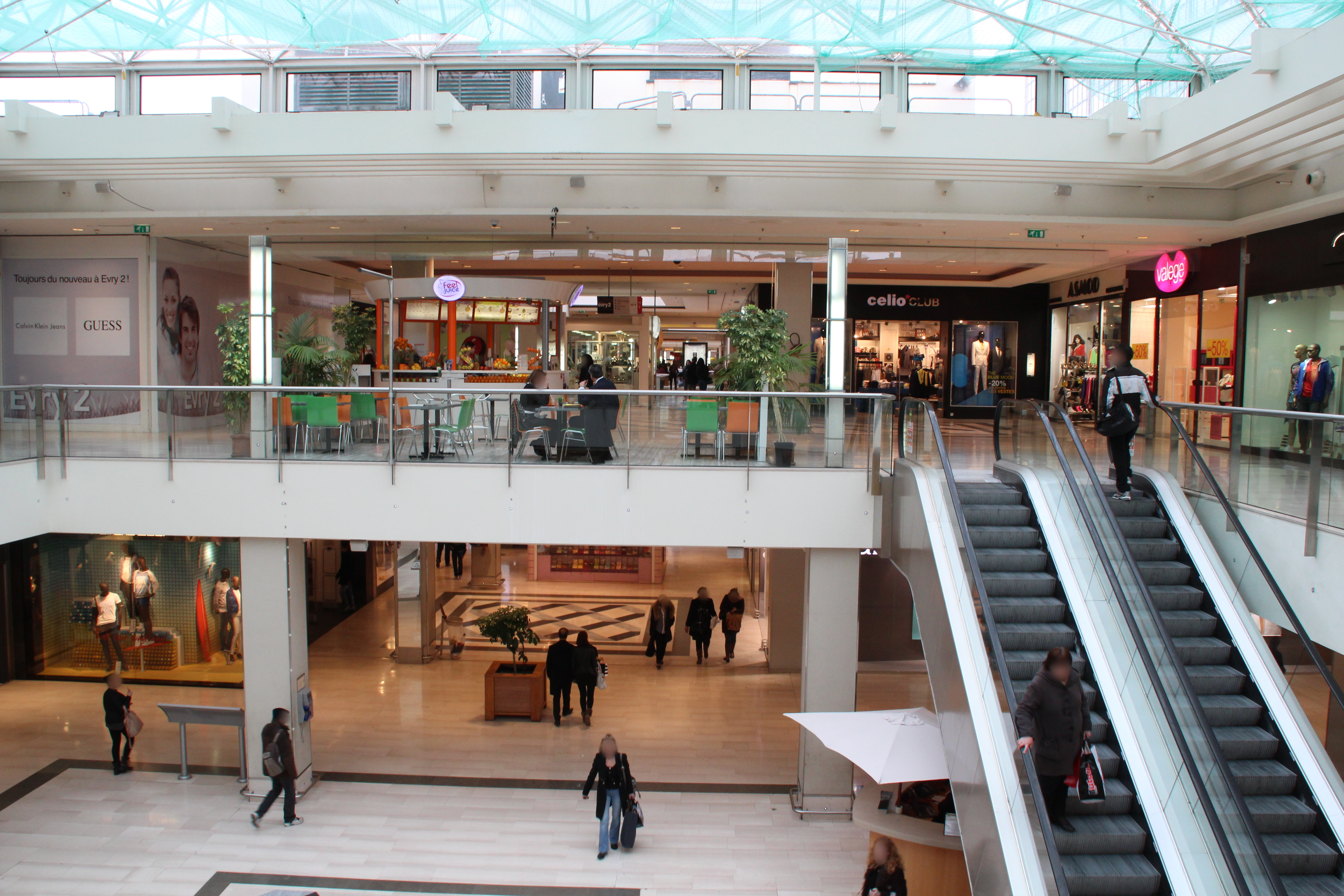
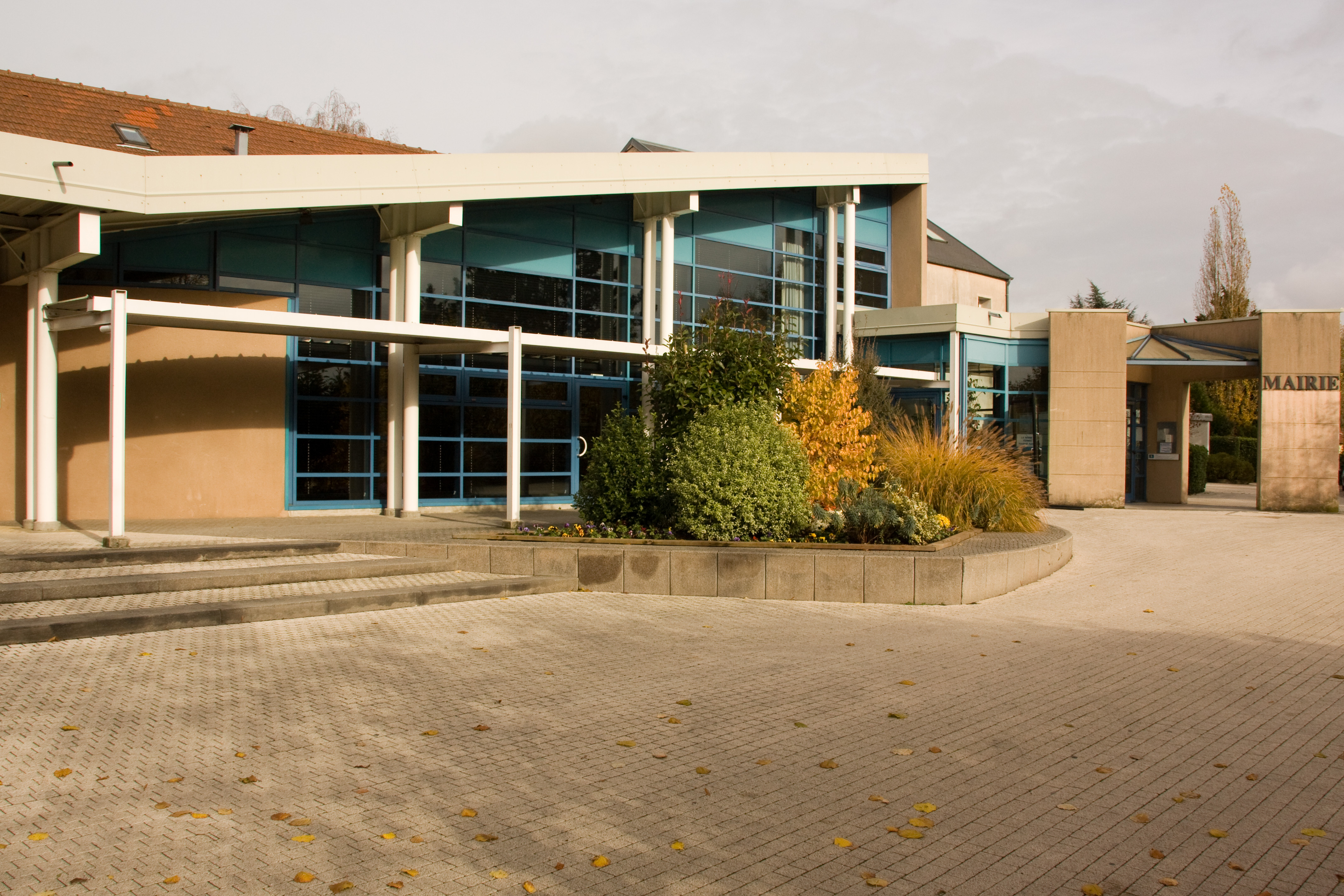
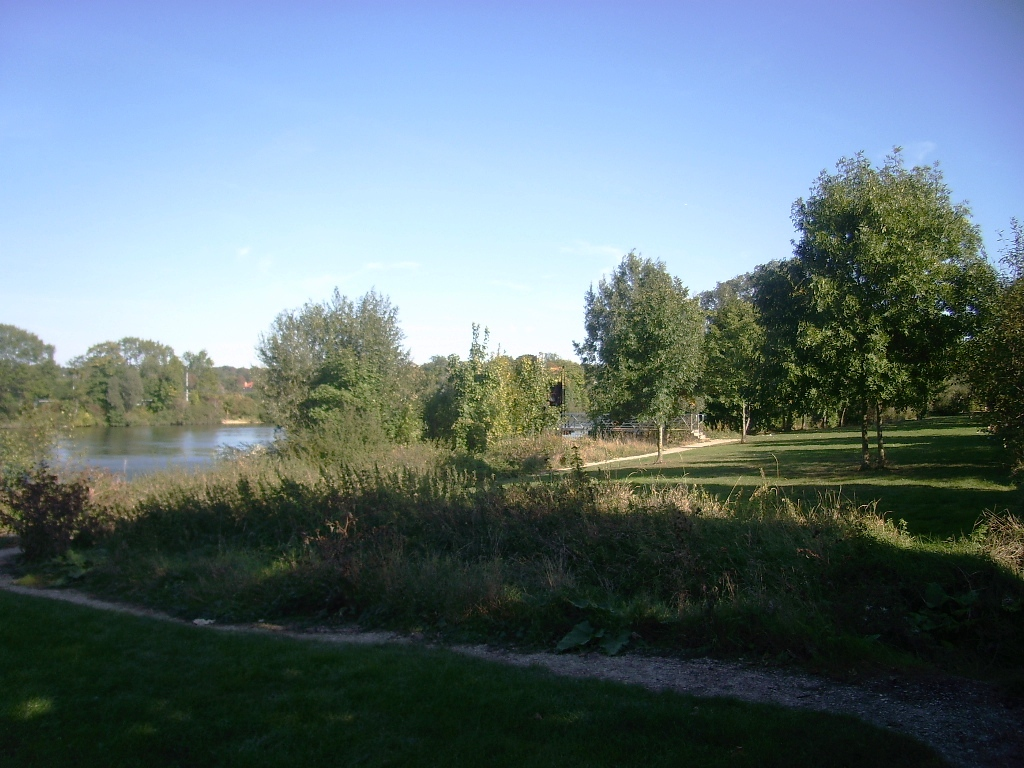
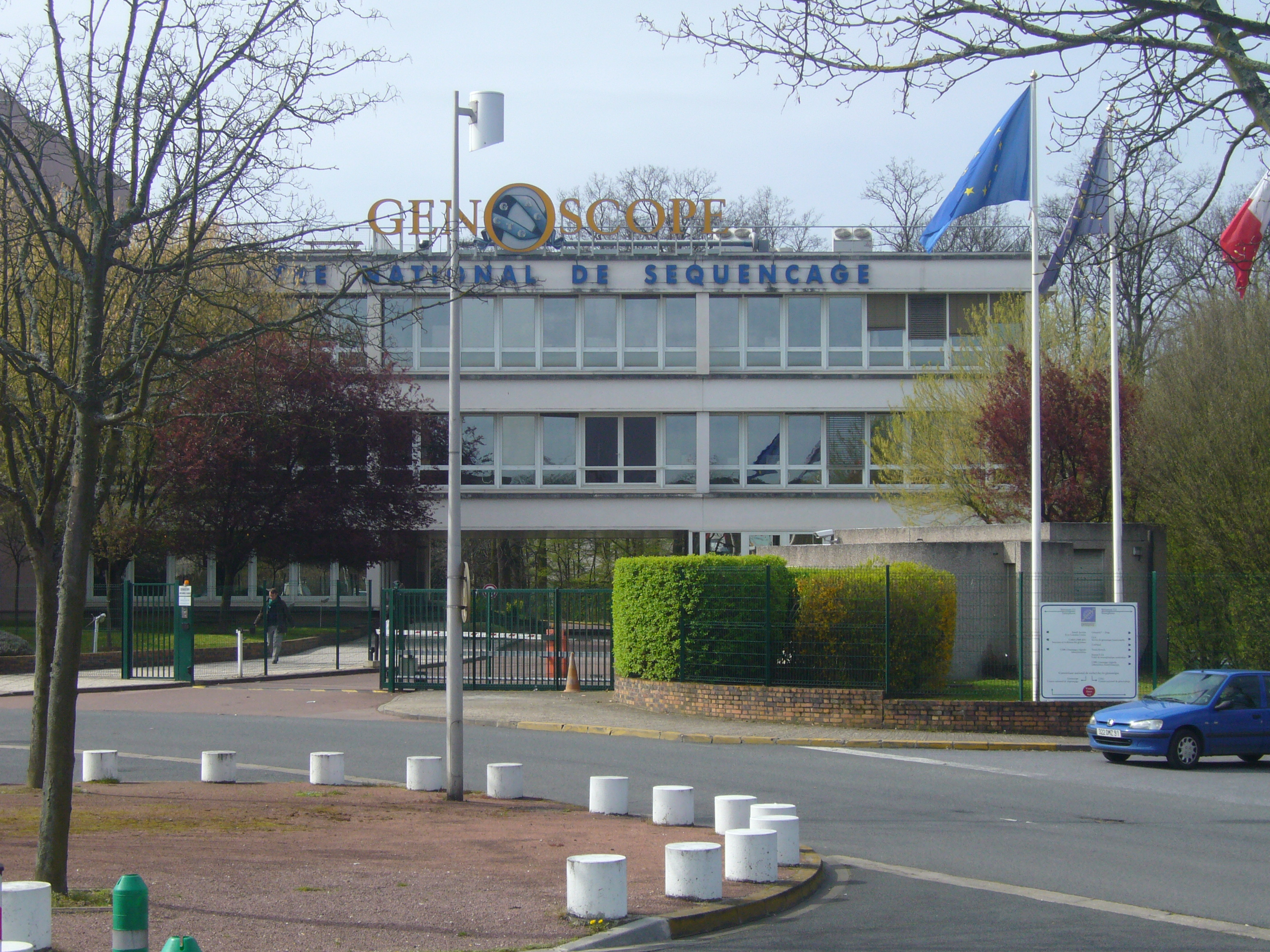
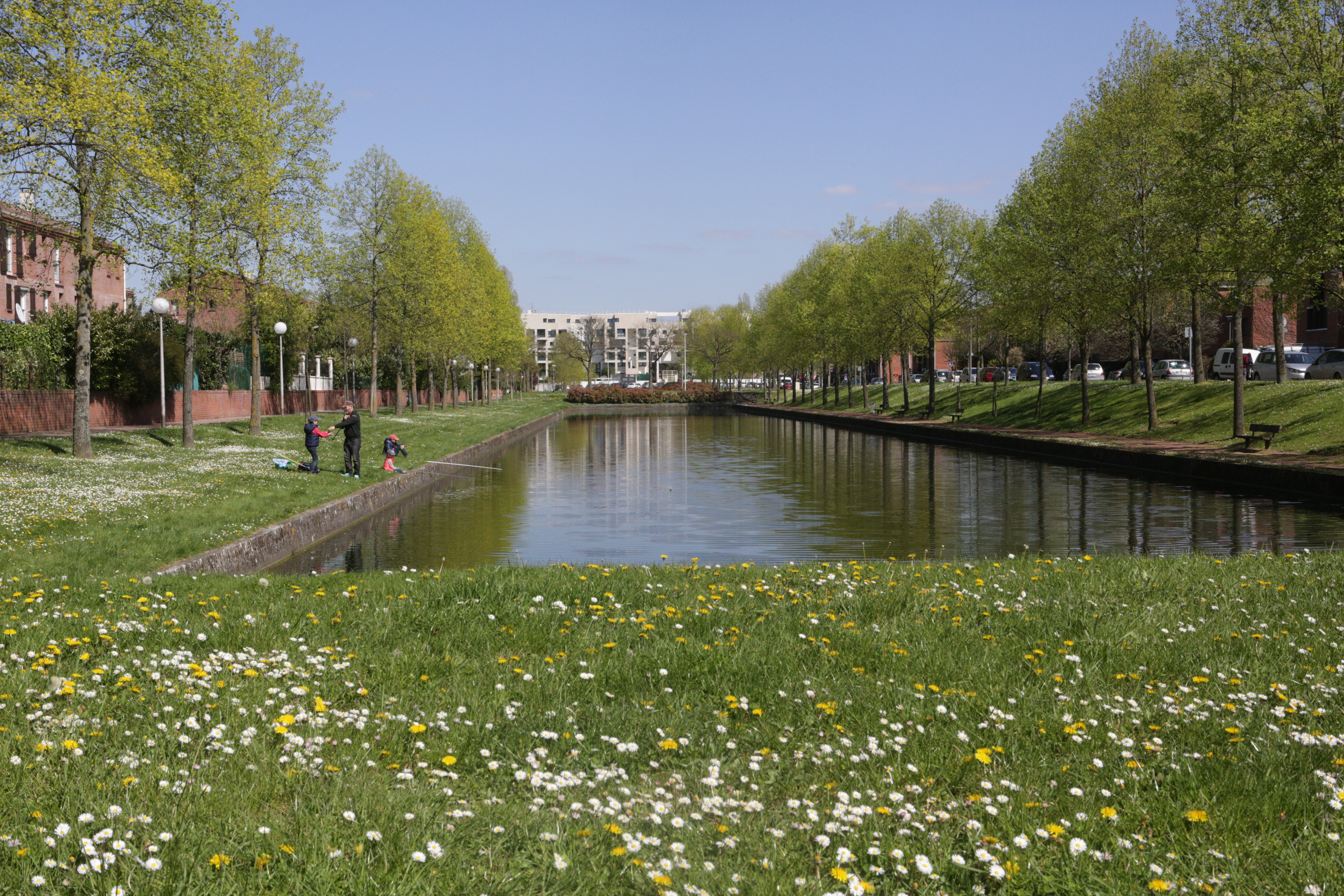
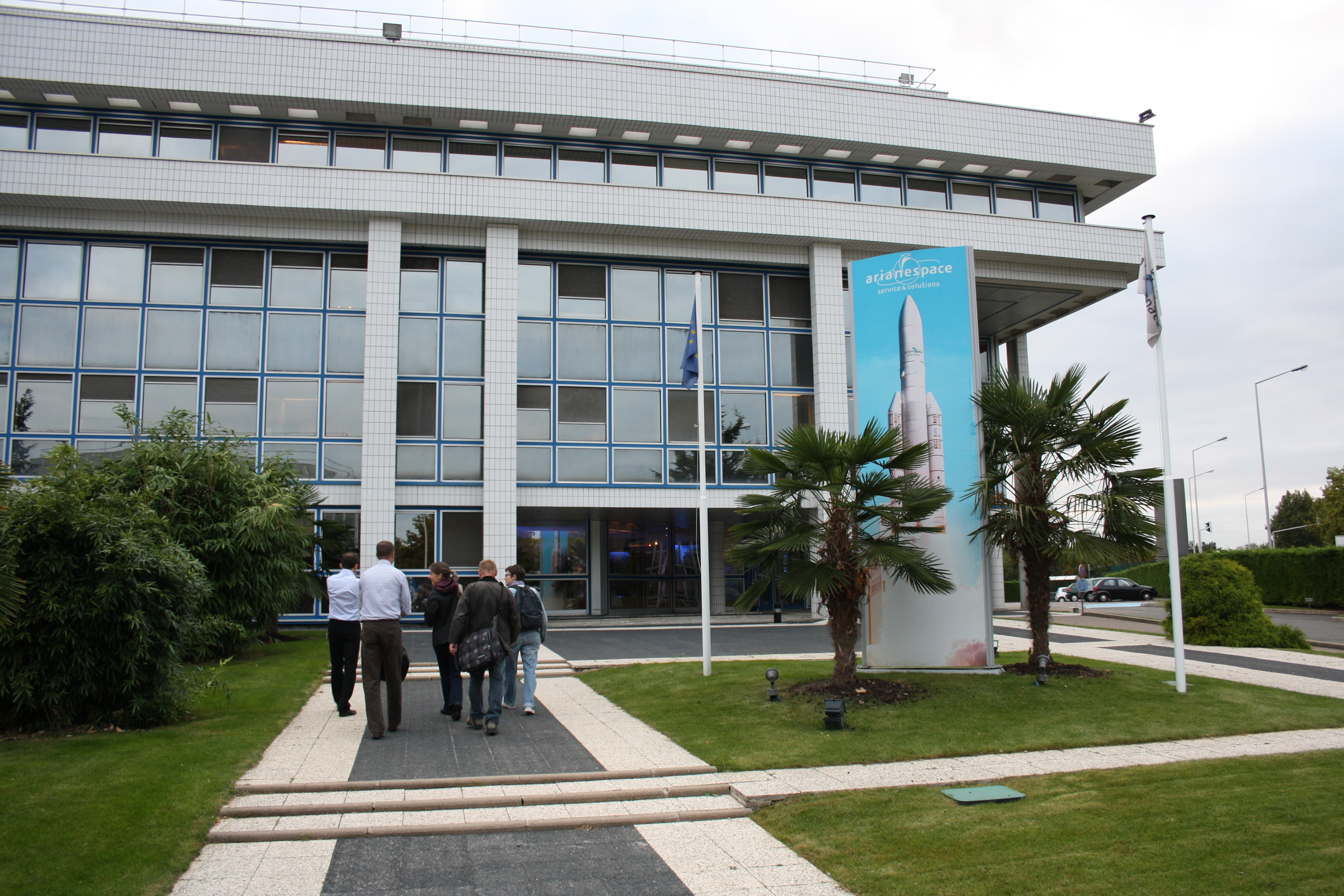
- From top to bottom, left to right: the church of Courcouronnes; Évry-Courcouronnes station; the Evry2 shopping center; the annex town hall of Courcouronnes; the Parc-Bord-de-Seine in Évry; the Genoscope in Évry; the Courcouronnes canal; the former Evry Space Center.
- Location of Évry-Courcouronnes
- Location within France Location within Île-de-France (region)
- Coordinates: 48°37′26″N 2°25′46″E
- Country: France
- Region: Île-de-France
- Department: Essonne
- Arrondissement: Évry
- Canton: Évry-Courcouronnes
- Intercommunality: CA Grand Paris Sud Seine-Essonne-Sénart

Government
  - Mayor (2020–2026): Stéphane Beaudet
- Area^{1}: 12.70 km^{2} (4.90 sq mi)
- Elevation: 53 m (174 ft)
- Highest elevation: 96 m (315 ft)
- Lowest elevation: 32 m (105 ft)
- Population (2023): 66,919
  - Density: 5,269/km^{2} (13,650/sq mi)
- Time zone: UTC+01:00 (CET)
  - Summer (DST): UTC+02:00 (CEST)
- INSEE/Postal code: 91228 /91000
- ^{1} French Land Register data, which excludes lakes, ponds, glaciers > 1 km^{2} (0.386 sq mi or 247 acres) and river estuaries.

Évry-Courcouronnes (French pronunciation: [evʁi kuʁkuʁɔn]) is a commune in the southern suburbs of Paris, France, prefecture of the department of Essonne.

It was established on 1 January 2019 from the amalgamation of the communes of Évry and Courcouronnes.

The city is the home of the Genopole.

== Population ==
Populations of the area corresponding with the commune of Évry-Courcouronnes at 1 January 2025.

Historical population
Year	Pop.	±% p.a.
1968	7,292	—
1975	19,663	+15.22%
1982	34,542	+8.38%
1990	58,793	+6.87%
1999	63,391	+0.84%
2007	67,138	+0.72%
2012	65,951	−0.36%
2017	67,967	+0.60%
2023	66,919	−0.26%
Source: INSEE

=== Place names, gaps and districts ===
- City Center / Agora
- Bois Guillaume
- The Pyramids
- Champs Elysées (bordering Ris-Orangis)
- Parc aux Biches (near Ris-Orangis)
- Bras-de-Fer (bordering Corbeil-Essonnes)
- The Aunettes (bordering Lisses)
- The Mousseau
- Aguado
- The Garenne (near Bondoufle)
- Petite Montagne
- Champtier-du-Coq
- The Canal / The Horizons (near Ris-Orangis)
- Grand Bourg (a neighborhood shared by Ris-Orangis)
- Parc des Loges
- Bois Sauvage (near Ris-Orangis)
- Hare Park
- The Epinettes (near Corbeil-Essonnes)
- Évry-Village (near Étiolles and Soisy-sur-Seine)

== Climate ==
Climate data for Évry-Courcouronnes (2008-2020 normals)Coordinates:48.62°N 2.41°E
Month	Jan	Feb	Mar	Apr	May	Jun	Jul	Aug	Sep	Oct	Nov	Dec	Year
Mean daily maximum °C (°F)	7.0 (44.6)	8.4 (47.1)	12.7 (54.9)	16.9 (62.4)	19.4 (66.9)	23.0 (73.4)	25.8 (78.4)	25.5 (77.9)	21.7 (71.1)	16.6 (61.9)	11.3 (52.3)	8.1 (46.6)	16.4 (61.5)
Daily mean °C (°F)	4.5 (40.1)	5.2 (41.4)	8.5 (47.3)	11.8 (53.2)	14.5 (58.1)	18.1 (64.6)	20.4 (68.7)	20.0 (68.0)	16.6 (61.9)	12.8 (55.0)	8.5 (47.3)	5.5 (41.9)	12.2 (54.0)
Mean daily minimum °C (°F)	2.0 (35.6)	2.0 (35.6)	4.3 (39.7)	6.6 (43.9)	9.5 (49.1)	13.2 (55.8)	15.0 (59.0)	14.4 (57.9)	11.5 (52.7)	9.0 (48.2)	5.7 (42.3)	3.0 (37.4)	8.0 (46.4)
Average precipitation mm (inches)	46.0 (1.81)	48.9 (1.93)	44.1 (1.74)	29.8 (1.17)	60.2 (2.37)	67.7 (2.67)	54.2 (2.13)	53.8 (2.12)	44.1 (1.74)	45.1 (1.78)	55.7 (2.19)	63.3 (2.49)	612.9 (24.14)
Average precipitation days (≥ 1 mm)	10.9	9.3	8.1	7.3	9.2	8.4	6.2	6.5	6.6	9.9	10.5	12.3	105.2
Mean monthly sunshine hours	64	108.3	125.1	199.9	222.3	197.2	263.9	214.3	192.3	103.8	83.7	53.9	1,828.7
Source: Infoclimat

== History ==
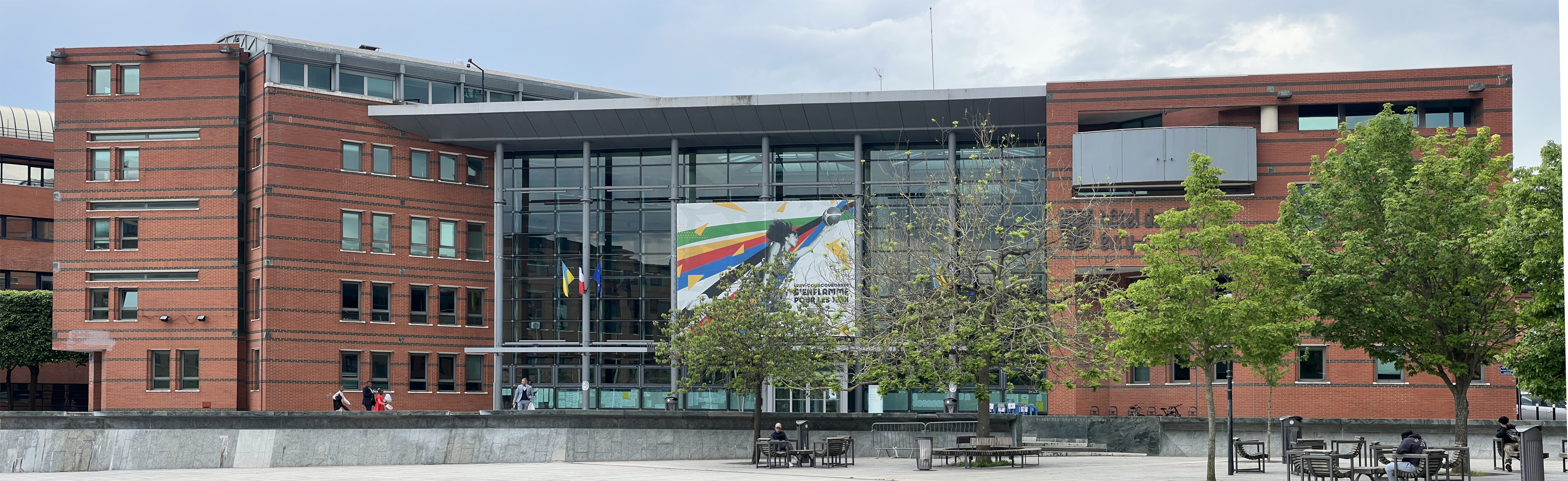
The Hôtel de Ville

The Hôtel de Ville, which was previously the town hall of Évry, was completed in 1991.

== Parks and recreation ==
Parc-du-Lac Courcouronnes is a relatively large park with a walking trail and a small lake. It is home to the famous "Dame du Lac" climbing wall constructed by architect Pierre Szekely in 1975. The wall has been closed to the public for the entirety of the 21st century; however, trespassers continue to use it regularly.

== Economy ==
Arianespace and Courtepaille have their respective headquarters in Évry-Courcouronnes. The Genopole biocluster research campus is also located in the commune.

== Education ==
- Institut Mines-Télécom Business School
- ENSIIE (National School of Computer Science for Industry and Business)
- Telecom SudParis
- University of Évry Val d'Essonne
