= List of deputies not running for re-election in the 2022 French legislative election =

Deputies not running for re-election in the 2022 French legislative election
- 12 & 19 June 2022

The following is a list of deputies who stood down at the 2022 French legislative election.

== List ==
List of deputies who announced they would not stand for reelection in 2022
Deputy	Seat	First elected	Party	Date announced	Ref.
Edith Audibert	Var's 3rd constituency	2020 (substitute)	LR	26 April 2022	
Gisèle Biémouret	Gers's 2nd constituency	2007	PS	24 January 2022	
Anne Blanc	Aveyron's 2nd constituency	2017	LREM	8 May 2022	
Jean-Claude Bouchet	Vaucluse's 2nd constituency	2007	LR	22 January 2022	
Sylvie Bouchet Bellecourt	Seine-et-Marne's 2nd constituency	2020 (substitute)	LR	24 February 2022	
Claire Bouchet	Hautes-Alpes's 2nd constituency	2020 (substitute)	PRG	June 2022	
Bernard Bouley	Essonne's 2nd constituency	2020 (substitute)	LR	21 April 2022	
Jean-Jacques Bridey	Val-de-Marne's 7th constituency	2012	LREM	11 May 2022	
Bernard Brochand	Alpes-Maritimes's 8th constituency	2001 (by-election)	LR	26 April 2022	
Marie-George Buffet	Seine-Saint-Denis's 4th constituency	1997	PCF	23 March 2022	
Émilie Cariou	Meuse's 2nd constituency	2017	LND	2 May 2022	
Gilles Carrez	Val-de-Marne's 5th constituency	1993	LR	10 January 2022	
Annie Chapelier	Gard's 4th constituency	2017	DVC (Note: Elected as a member of La République En Marche! (LREM), which she left in 2020.)	1 December 2021	
Fannette Charvier	Doubs's 1st constituency	2017	LREM	17 January 2022	
Gérard Cherpion	Vosges's 2nd constituency	1993	LR	24 February 2022	
Francis Chouat	Essonne's 1st constituency	2018 (by-election)	LREM	23 March 2022	
Yves Daniel	Loire-Atlantique's 6th constituency	2012	LREM	26 February 2022	
Bernard Deflesselles	Bouches-du-Rhône's 9th constituency	1999 (by-election)	LR	21 February 2022	
Typhanie Degois	Savoie's 1st constituency	2017	LREM	18 May 2022	
Rémi Delatte	Côte-d'Or's 2nd constituency	2007	LR	4 May 2022	
Nicolas Démoulin	Hérault's 8th constituency	2017	LREM	24 January 2022	
Jean-Pierre Door	Loiret's 4th constituency	2002	LR	17 September 2021	
Jeanine Dubié	Hautes-Pyrénées's 2nd constituency	2012	PRG	19 October 2021	
Marianne Dubois	Loiret's 5th constituency	2002	LR	17 September 2021	
Christelle Dubos	Gironde's 12th constituency	2017	LREM	3 March 2022	
Coralie Dubost	Hérault's 3rd constituency	2017	LREM	1 May 2022	
Jean-Paul Dufrègne	Allier's 1st constituency	2017	PCF	31 January 2022	
Laurence Dumont	Calvados's 2nd constituency	2007	PS	9 May 2022	
M'jid El Guerrab	French residents overseas 9th constituency (Northwest Africa)	2017	PRV	14 May 2022	
Valéria Faure-Muntian	Loire's 3rd constituency	2017	LREM	27 January 2022	
Jean-Michel Fauvergue	Seine-et-Marne's 8th constituency	2017	LREM	23 December 2021	
Jean-Jacques Ferrara	Corse-du-Sud's 1st constituency	2017	LR	13 May 2022	
Pascale Fontenel-Personne	Sarthe's 3rd constituency	2017	MoDem	26 February 2022	
Paula Forteza	French residents overseas 2nd constituency (South America)	2017	Non-Attached Member (Note: Elected as a member of La République En Marche! (LREM), which she left in 2020. She then sat as a member of Ecology Democracy Solidarity.)	16 March 2022	
Albane Gaillot	Val-de-Marne's 11th constituency	2017	DVC (Note: Elected as a member of La République En Marche! (LREM), which she left in 2019.)	3 October 2021	
Raphaël Gauvain	Saône-et-Loire's 5th constituency	2017	LREM	25 April 2022	
Philippe Gomès	New Caledonia's 2nd constituency	2012	CE	21 April 2022	
Florence Granjus	Yvelines's 12th constituency	2017	LREM	21 October 2021	
Émilie Guerel	Var's 7th constituency	2017	LREM	8 May 2022	
Christine Hennion	Hauts-de-Seine's 3rd constituency	2017	LREM	7 May 2022	
Antoine Herth	Bas-Rhin's 5th constituency	2002	Agir	6 March 2022	
Christian Hutin	Nord's 13th constituency	2012	MDC (Note: Elected as a member of the Citizen and Republican Movement (MRC), which he left in 2018.)	9 December 2021	
Christian Jacob	Seine-et-Marne's 4th constituency	1995 (by-election)	LR	29 April 2022	
Bruno Joncour	Côtes-d'Armor's 1st constituency	2017	MoDem	6 May 2022	
Régis Juanico	Loire's 1st constituency	2007	G.s	12 February 2022	
Jacques Krabal	Aisne's 5th constituency	2012	LREM	4 May 2022	
François-Michel Lambert	Bouches-du-Rhône's 10th constituency	2012	LEF	17 February 2022	
Jean Lassalle	Pyrénées-Atlantiques's 4th constituency	2002	R!	2 May 2022	
Gaël Le Bohec	Ille-et-Vilaine's 4th constituency	2017	LREM	3 May 2022	
Geneviève Levy	Var's 1st constituency	2002	LR	10 May 2022	
Monique Limon	Isère's 7th constituency	2017	LREM	24 February 2022	
Mounir Mahjoubi	Paris's 16th constituency	2017	LREM	29 December 2021	
Josette Manin	Martinique's 1st constituency	2017	BPM	8 March 2022	
Jean-Luc Mélenchon	Bouches-du-Rhône's 4th constituency	2017	LFI	12 May 2022	
Gérard Menuel	Aube's 3rd constituency	2014 (substitute)	LR	12 February 2022	
Monica Michel	Bouches-du-Rhône's 16th constituency	2017	LREM	19 May 2022	
Thierry Michels	Bas-Rhin's 1st constituency	2017	LREM	26 January 2022	
Sébastien Nadot	Haute-Garonne's 10th constituency	2017	MDP	2 March 2022	
Mickaël Nogal	Haute-Garonne's 4th constituency	2017	LREM	18 December 2021	
Claire O'Petit	Eure's 5th constituency	2017	LREM	9 May 2022	
Matthieu Orphelin	Maine-et-Loire's 1st constituency	2017	DVC (Note: Elected as a member of La République En Marche! (LREM), which he left in 2019.)	18 February 2022	
Hervé Pellois	Morbihan's 1st constituency	2012	LREM	12 January 2022	
Bernard Perrut	Rhône's 9th constituency	1997	LR	27 April 2022	
Pierre Person	Paris's 6th constituency	2017	LREM	5 April 2022	
Damien Pichereau	Sarthe's 1st constituency	2017	LREM	25 January 2022	
Bérengère Poletti	Ardennes's 1st constituency	2002	LR	1 March 2022	
Jean-Luc Poudroux	Réunion's 7th constituency	2018 (by-election)	LR	10 May 2022	
Catherine Pujol	Pyrénées-Orientales's 2nd constituency	2020 (substitute)	RN	21 May 2022	
Nadia Ramassamy	Réunion's 6th constituency	2017	LR	10 June 2022	
Pierre-Alain Raphan	Essonne's 10th constituency	2017	LREM	12 April 2022	
Julien Ravier	Bouches-du-Rhône's 1st constituency	2020 (substitute)	LR	11 January 2022 (Note: Declared ineligible for a year by decision of the Conseil d'État on that date.)	
Frédéric Reiss	Bas-Rhin's 8th constituency	2002	LR	9 May 2022	
Jean-Luc Reitzer	Haut-Rhin's 3rd constituency	1988	LR	6 May 2022	
Hugues Renson	Paris's 13th constituency	2017	LREM	16 February 2022	
Laëtitia Romeiro Dias	Essonne's 3rd constituency	2017	LREM	7 May 2022	
Gwendal Rouillard	Morbihan's 5th constituency	2011 (substitute)	LREM	26 January 2022	
Sabine Rubin	Seine-Saint-Denis's 9th constituency	2017	LFI	4 February 2022	
François de Rugy	Loire-Atlantique's 1st constituency	2007	LREM	6 October 2021	
Pacôme Rupin	Paris's 7th constituency	2017	LREM	5 April 2022	
Maina Sage	French Polynesia's 1st constituency	2014 (by-election)	LREM	9 November 2021	
Jean-Marie Sermier	Jura's 3rd constituency	2002	LR	15 January 2022	
Thierry Solère	Hauts-de-Seine's 9th constituency	2012	LREM	20 May 2022	
Denis Sommer	Doubs's 3rd constituency	2017	LREM	18 November 2021	
Guy Teissier	Bouches-du-Rhône's 6th constituency	1993	LR	23 February 2022	
Jennifer de Temmerman	Nord's 15th constituency	2017	DVG	16 February 2022	
Alice Thourot	Drôme's 2nd constituency	2017	LREM	12 January 2022	
Jean-Louis Touraine	Rhône's 3rd constituency	2007	LREM	14 January 2022	
Alain Tourret	Calvados's 6th constituency	2012	LREM	4 October 2021	
Frédérique Tuffnell	Charente-Maritime's 2nd constituency	2017	MoDem	15 June 2021	
Hélène Vainqueur-Christophe	Guadeloupe's 4th constituency	2017	PS	4 May 2022	
Pierre Venteau	Haute-Vienne's 2nd constituency	2019 (substitute)	LREM	4 May 2022	
Charles de la Verpillière	Ain's 2nd constituency	2007	LR	11 November 2021	

== See also ==
- Election results of Cabinet Ministers during the 2022 French legislative election
- List of MPs who lost their seat in the 2022 French legislative election
- Results of the 2022 French legislative election by constituency
