= Causeur =

Causeur may refer to:

- Causeur (magazine), a French magazine founded in 2007, edited by Élisabeth Lévy
- Fabien Causeur (born 1987), French basketball player
- Causerie, a French literary style of short informal essays mostly unknown in the English-speaking world
