= Taille (disambiguation) =

Taille was a land tax in Ancien Régime France.

Taille may also refer to:

- Lower-grade juice from the Pressing of grapes in Champagne production, while the best juice is called the cuvée
- taille, a name used in the Baroque era for an open belled variant of the Baroque Cor anglais
- The name used in France for the vocal timbre of the baritenore
- Sophie Taillé-Polian (born 1974), French politician
