= Laurent Alexandre =

French politician

Member of the National Assembly for Aveyron's 2nd constituency
- Incumbent
- Assumed office 22 June 2022
- Preceded by: Anne Blanc

Personal details
- Born: 9 June 1973 (age 52) Decazeville, Aveyron, France
- Party: La France Insoumise

Laurent Alexandre, born 9 June 1973 in Decazeville (Aveyron), is a French politician of La France Insoumise who has been representing Aveyron's 2nd constituency in the National Assembly since 2022.

== Personal life ==
Laurent Alexandre is the son of a factory worker and a cleaner. He holds a vocational baccalaureate and a BTS in composite materials. In 1998 he was hired by the manufacturer Ratier-Figeac and in 2000 he joined the General Confederation of Labour (CGT). He later worked as a skilled worker at Collins Aerospace.

== Political career ==
Laurent Alexandre has been mayor of Aubin, a town with fewer than 4,000 inhabitants, since May 2020, and vice-president of the Decazeville Communauté intermunicipal authority.

In the 2022 legislative elections, he ran in Aveyron’s second constituency under the LFI-NUPES label. He came first in the first round with 27.78% of the vote, ahead of a LREM candidate. He was elected in the second round with 50.99% of the vote. No deputies in the previous legislature had been manual workers. In accordance with French rules on the non-accumulation of mandates, he resigned as mayor.

He has expressed his intention to oppose the closure of 153 beds at the nursing home (EHPAD) in Villefranche-de-Rouergue, as well as the closure of the Aveyron metalworking company in Viviez.

After the National Assembly was dissolved by Emmanuel Macron, he ran for re-election in the 2024 legislative elections. He was re-elected in the second round against the National Rally candidate.

== See also ==
- List of deputies of the 16th National Assembly of France
- List of deputies of the 17th National Assembly of France
