= Christian Assaf =

French politician (born 1972)

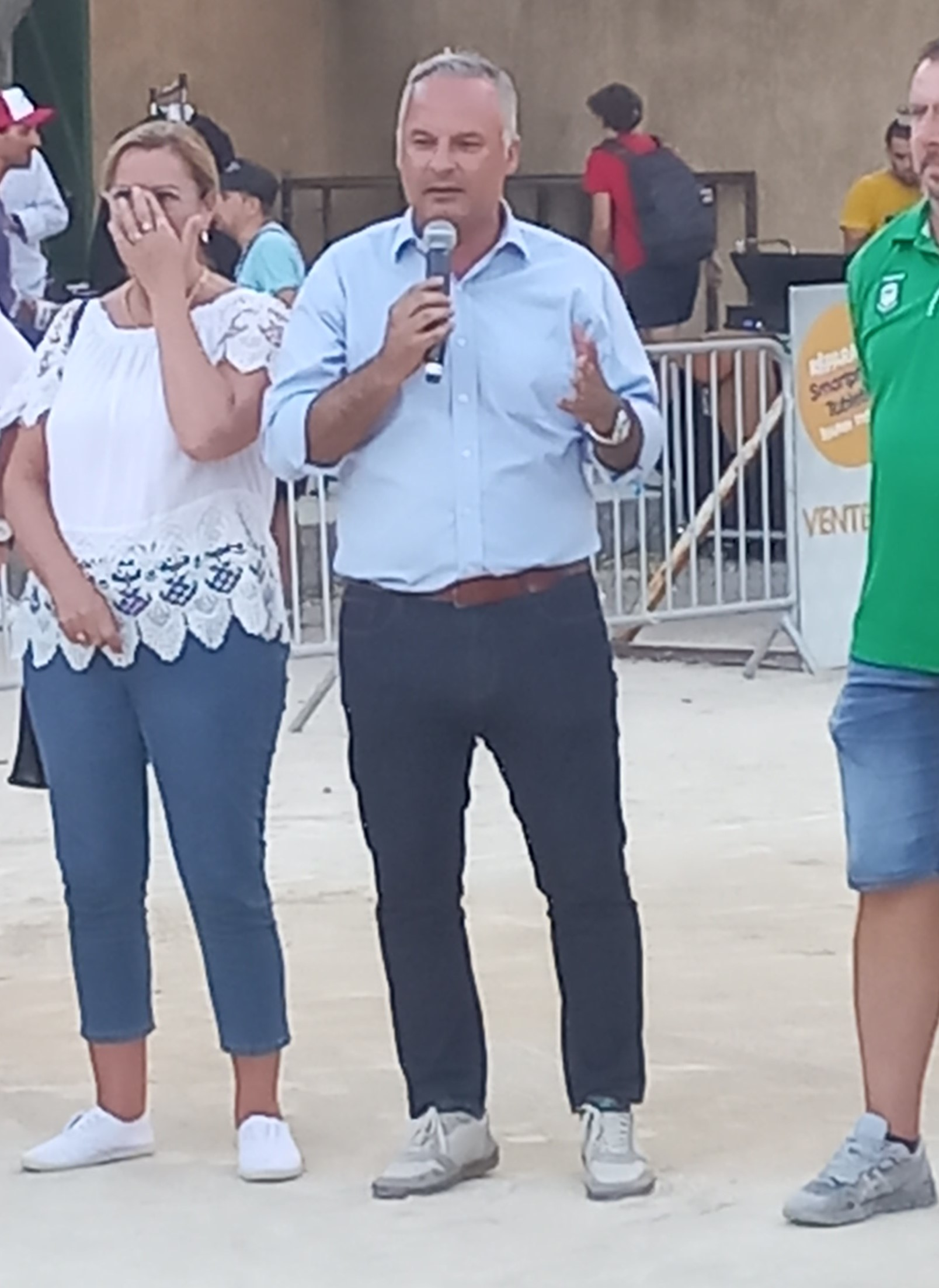
- Assaf in 2022

Member of the French National Assembly for Hérault's 8th constituency
- In office 20 June 2012 – 20 June 2017
- Preceded by: Constituency established
- Succeeded by: Nicolas Démoulin

Personal details
- Born: 1 September 1972 (age 53)
- Party: Socialist Party

Christian Assaf (born 1 September 1972) is a French politician serving as a member of the Regional Council of Occitania since 2016. From 2012 to 2017, he was a member of the National Assembly.
