= Julien Dray =

French politician

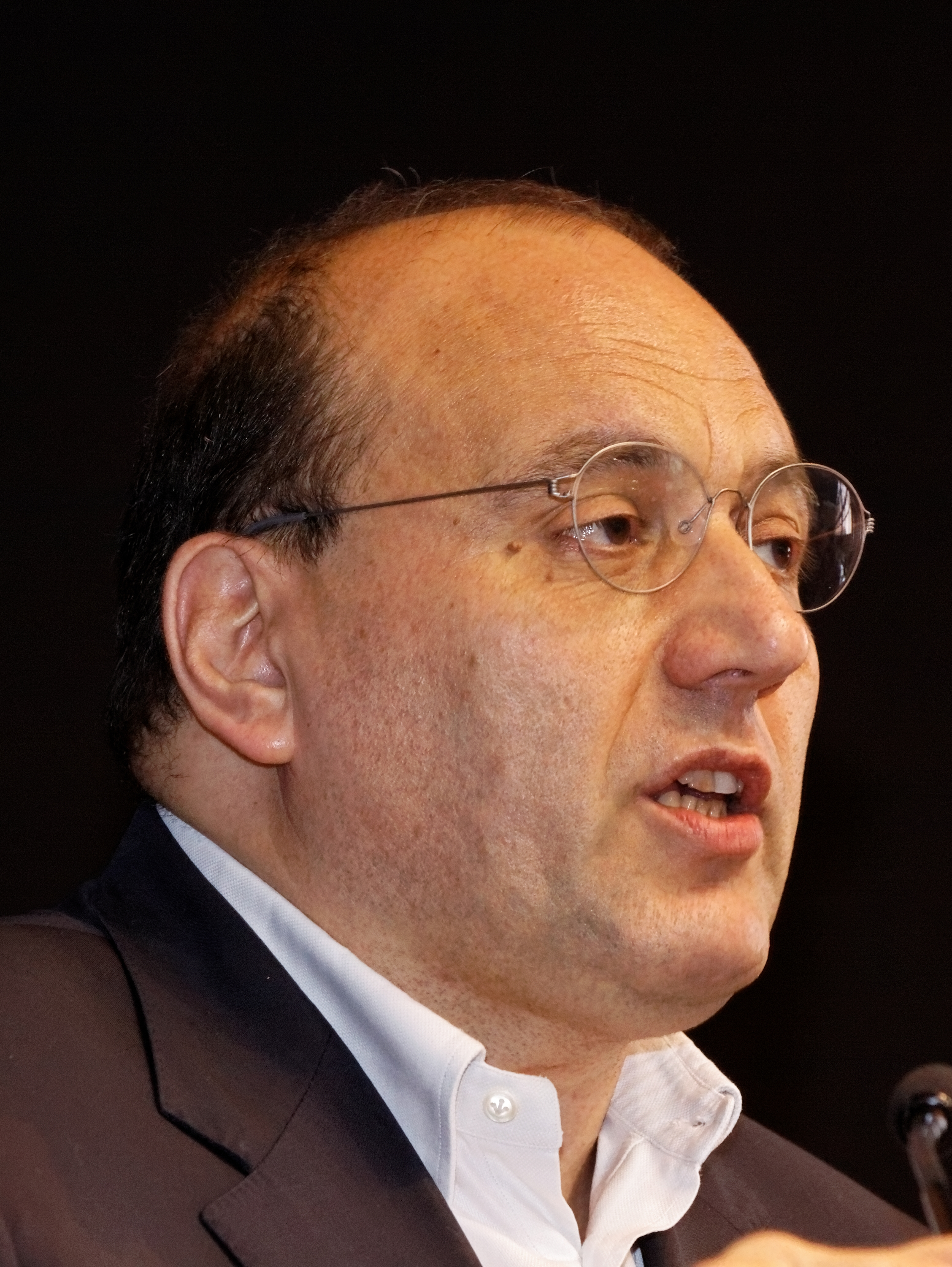
- Dray in 2012

Member of the Regional Council of Île-de-France
- In office 16 March 1998 – 27 June 2021
- President: Jean-Paul Huchon; Valérie Pécresse

Member of the National Assembly for Essonne's 10th constituency
- In office 23 June 1988 – 19 June 2012
- Succeeded by: Malek Boutih

Personal details
- Born: 5 March 1955 (age 71) Oran, French Algeria
- Party: Socialist Party
- Education: University of Paris 13 Nord

Julien Dray (born 5 March 1955 in Oran, French Algeria) is a French politician. He is a member of the French Socialist Party, member of the regional council of Île-de-France and was a member of the National Assembly of France between 1988 and 2012. He was a Trotskyist activist till 1981 and a cofounder with his friend Harlem Désir of SOS Racisme, of which he was vice president from 1984 to 1988.

== Works ==
- SOS génération, Ramsay, 1987
- Lettres d'un député de base à ceux qui nous gouvernent, Flammarion, 1989
- La Guerre qu'il ne fallait pas faire, Albin Michel, 1991
- Les Clairons de Maastricht (with Gérard Filoche), Ramsay, 1992
- De la gauche en général et de l'archaïsme en particulier, Belfond, 1994
- Chronique d'une différence (with François Baroin and Pierre Doncieux), Editions 1, 1998
- Sept jours dans la vie d'Attika (with Harlem Désir, Gérard Filoche, Marie-Noëlle Lienemann and Jean-Luc Mélenchon), Ramsay, 2000
- État de violence, J'ai lu, 2002
- Comment peut-on encore être socialiste ?, Grasset, 2003
- Règlement de comptes, Hachette Littératures, 2007
- Et maintenant ?, Le cherche midi, 2008
- La fin des Vingt perverses, Betapolitique, 2008
