= Sylvain Carrière =

French politician (born 1991)

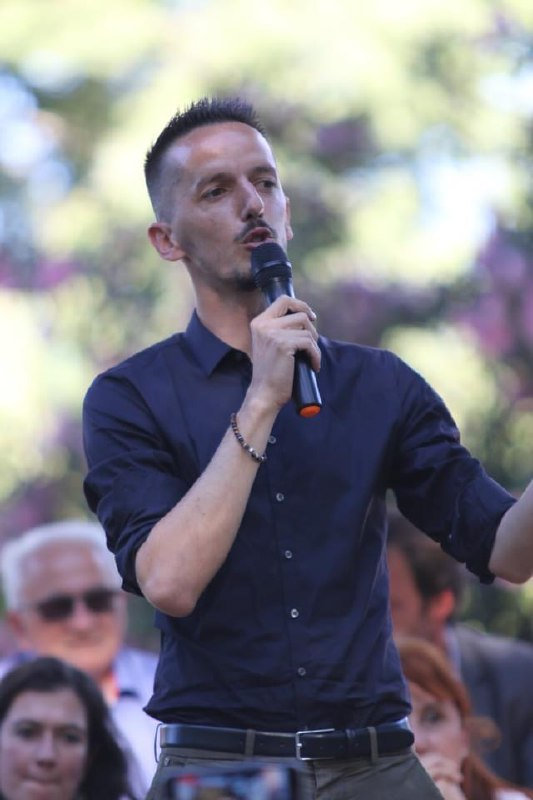
- Carrière in December 2022

Member of the National Assembly for Hérault's 8th constituency
- Incumbent
- Assumed office 22 June 2022
- Preceded by: Nicolas Démoulin

Personal details
- Born: 21 May 1991 (age 35) Béziers, France
- Party: La France Insoumise
- Other political affiliations: Left Party

Sylvain Carrière (French pronunciation: [silvɛ̃ kaʁjɛʁ]; born 21 May 1991) is a French politician of La France Insoumise (LFI) who has represented Hérault's 8th constituency in the National Assembly since 2022.

== Biography ==
Sylvain Carrière was born in 1991 in Béziers, Hérault. He lived as a child in Montagnac, then attended Jean-Moulin High School in Pézenas, where he obtained his high-school diploma in economics and social sciences. He went on to study for a technical and commercial agricultural diploma in Rodilhan, Gard, which he obtained in 2011.

From 2011 to 2015, he worked as a sales consultant at gardening company Jardiland. Between 2015 and 2022, he worked as a sales assistant in a pet shop in Saint-Jean-de-Védas.

In the 2022 legislative election, after incumbent deputy Nicolas Démoulin of La République En Marche! declined to seek a second term, Carrière was elected to the National Assembly in the 8th constituency of Hérault for La France Insoumise with 50.5% of the second-round vote against the National Rally candidate. In 2024, he was reelected after placing second in the first round, with 50.3% of the second-round vote in a re-match.

In the National Assembly, he sits on the Committee on Sustainable Development, Spatial and Regional Planning.
