= Anne Blanc =

French politician (born 1966)

Member of the French Parliament for Aveyron's 2nd constituency
- In office 21 June 2017 – 2022
- Preceded by: Marie-Lou Marcel
- Succeeded by: Laurent Alexandre
- Majority: 100%

Personal details
- Born: 20 July 1966 (age 59) Rodez, Aveyron, France
- Party: En Marche!
- Occupation: Politician

Anne Blanc (born 20 July 1966) is a French politician of La République En Marche! (LREM) who served as a member of the French National Assembly from 2017 to 2022, representing the department of Aveyron.

== Political career ==
In parliament, Blanc served on the Committee on Economic Affairs. In addition to her committee assignments, she chaired the French-Brazilian Parliamentary Friendship Group.

== Political positions ==
In April 2018, Blanc joined other co-signatories around Sébastien Nadot in officially filing a request for a commission of inquiry into the legality of French weapons sales to the Saudi-led coalition fighting in Yemen, days before an official visit of Saudi Crown Prince Mohammed bin Salman to Paris.

In July 2019, Blanc decided not to align with her parliamentary group's majority and became one of 52 LREM members who abstained from a vote on the French ratification of the European Union’s Comprehensive Economic and Trade Agreement (CETA) with Canada.

== See also ==
- 2017 French legislative election
