= Antoine Léaument =

French politician (born 1989)

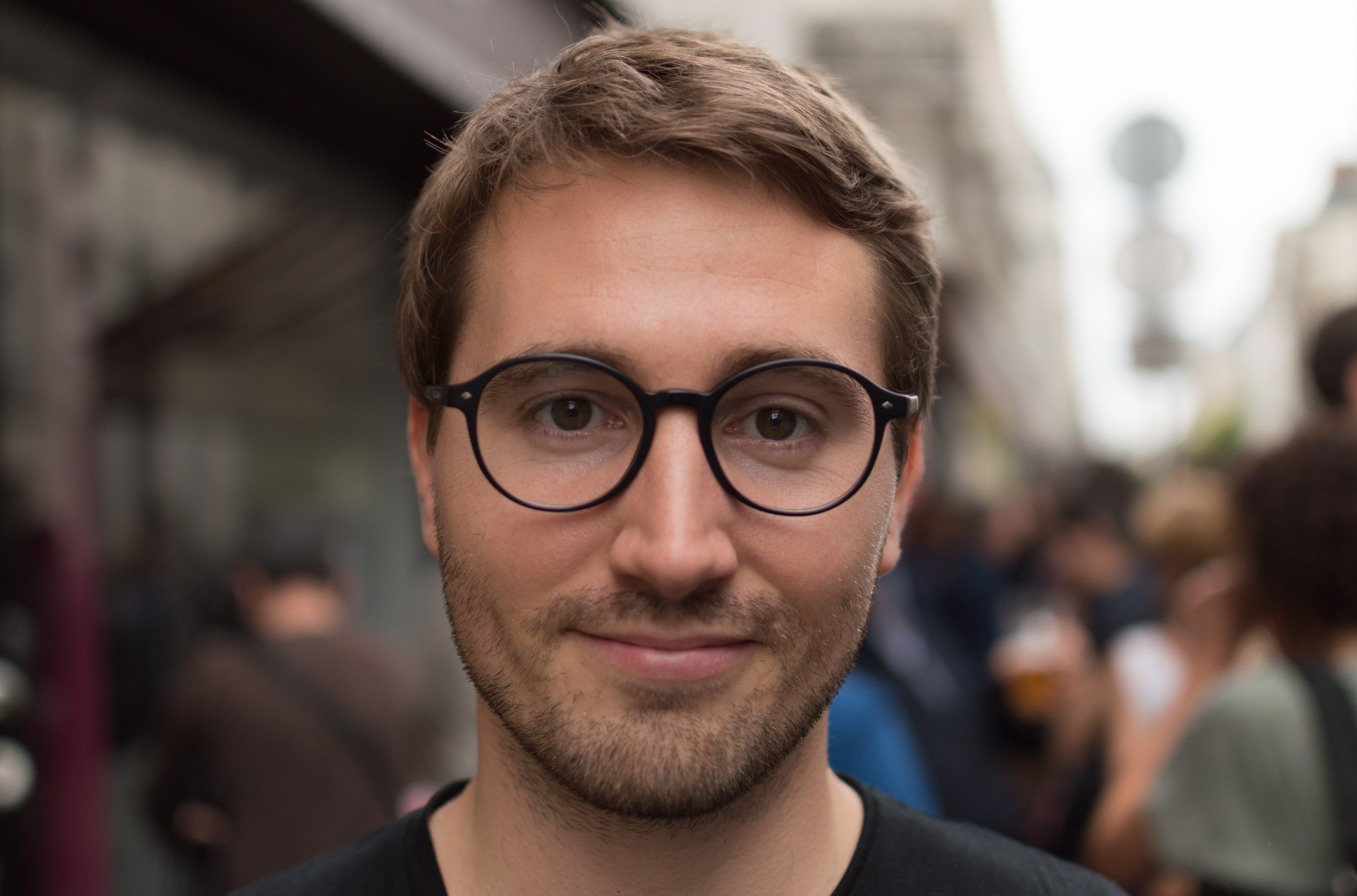
- Antoine Léaument in 2017

Member of the National Assembly for Essonne's 10th constituency
- Incumbent
- Assumed office 22 June 2022
- Preceded by: Pierre-Alain Raphan

Personal details
- Born: Antoine Nicolas Gabriel Léaument; 4 September 1989 (age 37) Châteauroux, France
- Party: La France Insoumise (since 2016)
- Other political affiliations: New Popular Front
- Education: University of Poitiers; Paris 1 Panthéon-Sorbonne University

Antoine Léaument (born 4 September 1989) is a French politician of La France Insoumise (LFI) who has been representing Essonne's 10th constituency in the National Assembly since 2022.

In a tweet dated 31 January 2025, he called for the enforcement of "the law against the admirers of Louis Capet", referring in a threatening tone to monarchists holding a commemoration of the executed King Louis XVI, and called for a ban of the "Souvenir de Louis XVI", organisers of this commemoration in a letter to Minister of the Interior, Bruno Retailleau.

== Personal life ==
Léaument is of Belgian and Italian descent.

== See also ==
- List of deputies of the 16th National Assembly of France
