= Serge Roques =

French politician

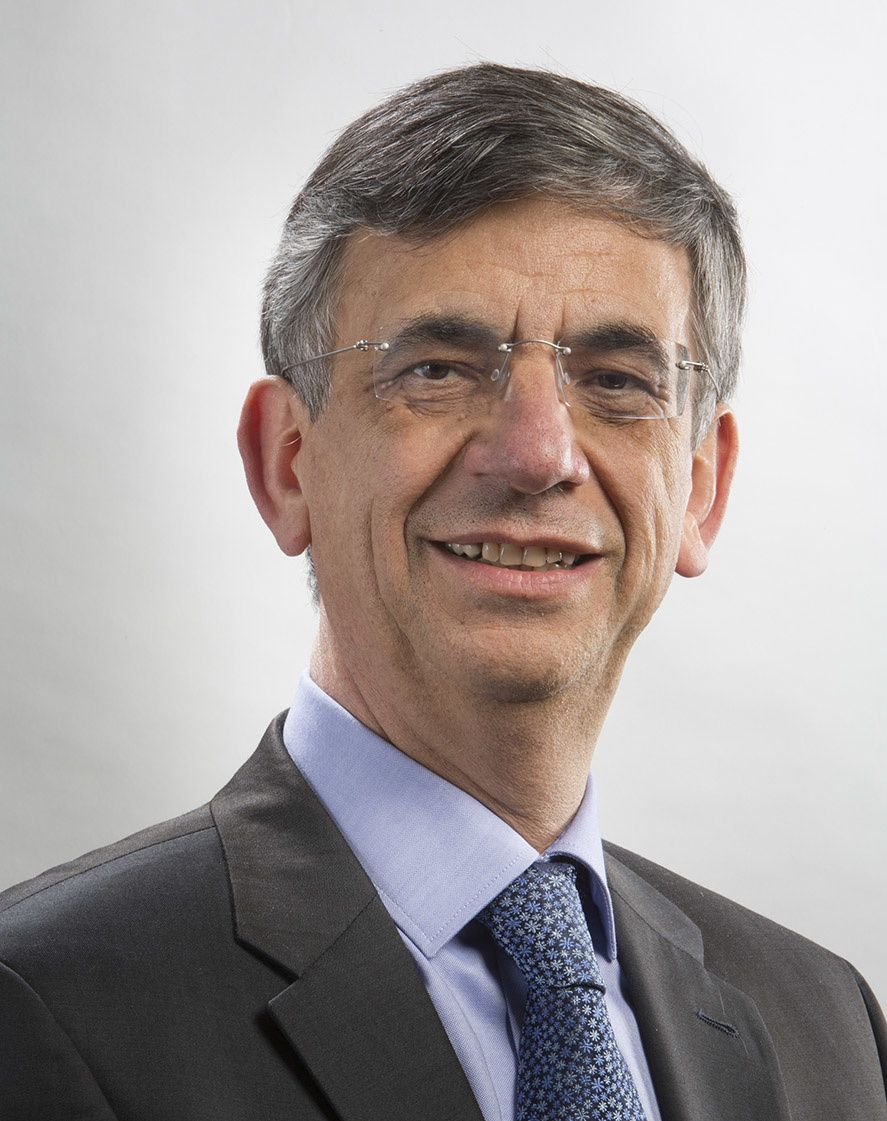

Serge Roques (born 11 June 1947 in Albi, Tarn) is a French politician and mayor of Villefranche-de-Rouergue (Aveyron). He is a member of the Union for a Popular Movement.

Roques was first elected for the Union for French Democracy (UDF) to represent Aveyron's 2nd constituency in 1993, but he was defeated by Jean Rigal in 1997. He returned to the National Assembly representing the same constituency in 2002 but was defeated for re-election in 2007. He is also Mayor of Villefranche-de-Rouergue, the major city in the 2nd constituency.
