= Alexandre Portier =

French politician (born 1990)

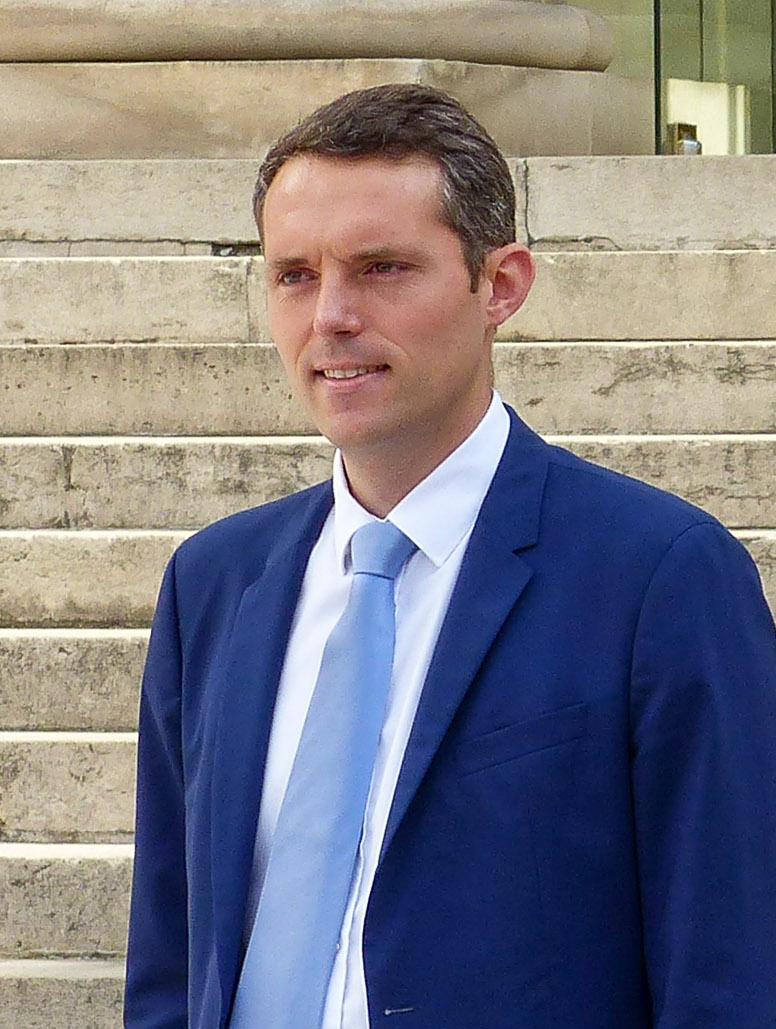

Member of the National Assembly for Rhône's 9th constituency
- Incumbent
- Assumed office 2 October 2025
- Succeeded by: Pascale Bay
- In office 22 June 2022 – 9 June 2024
- Preceded by: Bernard Perrut

Personal details
- Born: 21 April 1990 (age 36) La Tronche, Isère, France
- Party: Republican
- Other political affiliations: UMP (until 2015)
- Education: École normale supérieure Sciences Po; Institut Catholique de Paris

Alexandre Portier (born 21 April 1990) is a French politician from The Republicans.

In the 2014 French municipal elections, he was elected municipal councillor in Villefranche-sur-Saône.

Since 2017, Alexandre Portier has been vice-president of the Communauté d'agglomération Villefranche Beaujolais Saône and deputy mayor of Villefranche-sur-Saône.

In the 2022 French legislative election, he was elected Republican Member of Parliament for Rhône's 9th constituency. Within the National Assembly, he is a member of the cultural affairs and education committee.

== Biography ==
=== Early life and education ===
He was enrolled at the private Notre-Dame-de-Mongré High School in Villefranche-sur-Saône.

Portier became a student of the Institut Catholique de Paris, here he obtained a degree in philosophy in 2011. Then in 2013, as a student at the École normale supérieure. He holds a master 's degree in contemporary philosophy.

In 2015, Alexandre Portier obtained a master's degree in public affairs at Sciences Po.

=== Career ===
Following his studies, he became an advisor in the office of the president of the Auvergne-Rhône-Alpes, before being appointed project manager within the department of evaluation of public and prospective policies. At the same time, Alexandre Portier was elected municipal councillor in the 2014 French municipal elections and deputy mayor of Villefranche-sur-Saône in 2017. Since 2017, Alexandre Portier has been vice-president of the Communauté d'agglomération Villefranche Beaujolais Saône.

In the 2022 French legislative election, he was the Republican for Rhône's 9th constituency. Portier was endorsed by the local MP Bernard Perrut to be his successor. In the election he was elected Member of Parliament in the second round by winning 61.51% against Ambroise Méjean the LREM candidate.

He is considered a right-wing populist and he is close to Laurent Wauquiez.
