= Albane Gaillot =

French politician

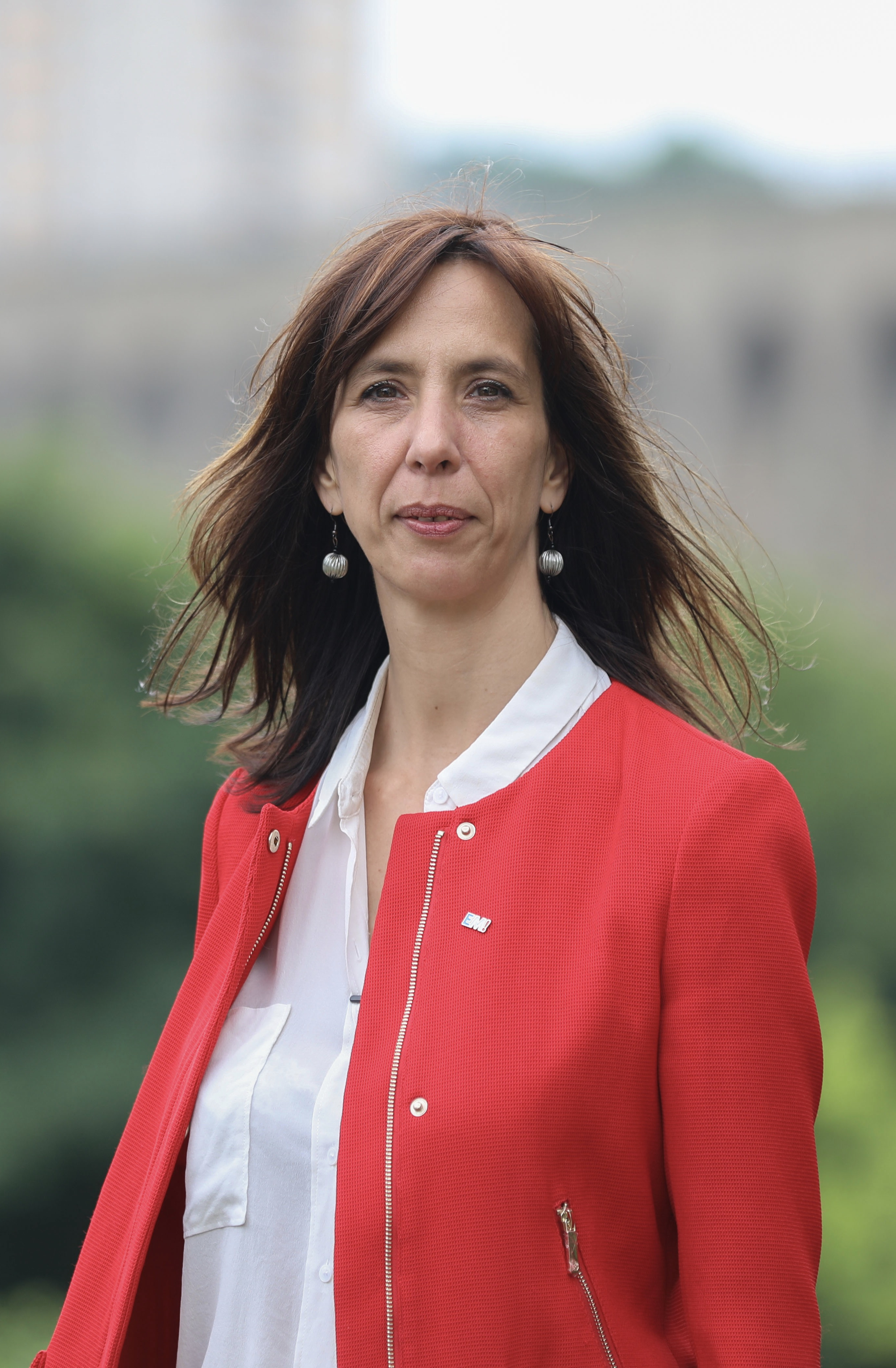

Member of the National Assembly for Val-de-Marne's 11th constituency
- In office 21 June 2017 – 21 June 2022
- Preceded by: Jean-Yves Le Bouillonnec
- Succeeded by: Sophie Taillé-Polian

Personal details
- Born: 7 July 1971 (age 55) Paris, France
- Party: La République En Marche (2016–2019), Ecology Democracy Solidarity (since 2020)
- Education: Panthéon-Assas University

Albane Gaillot (French: [alban ɡajo]; born 7 July 1971) is a French politician who served as a member of the French National Assembly from 2017 to 2022, where she represented the 11th constituency of Val-de-Marne. From 2016 until 2019, she was a member of La République En Marche (LREM). In May 2020, she was one of 17 deputies who formed the new Ecology, Democracy, Solidarity group in the National Assembly.

== Early life and education ==
After studying law at the University of Paris II Panthéon-Assas, Gaillot worked from 1999 in a social protection group. She has held various positions, starting with the role of pension account manager, going through the position of complementary retirement advisor before becoming a digital project manager.

== Political career ==
=== Local politics ===
Gaillot first got involved in politics during the French municipal elections of 2014, placing fourth on the list "Villejuif notre ville" (Centre-left politics citizen list and ecologist) led by Philippe Vidal (DVG). The list collects 10.64% of the votes in the first round, and merges with three other lists for the second round. Gaillot was not included in this new list led by Franck Le Bohellec (UMP) who will take away the town hall. She leaves the movement "Villejuif notre ville" in June 2015.

=== Member of the National Assembly, 2017–present ===
In the 2017 French legislative election, Gaillot was elected member of the National Assembly for the 11th constituency of Val-de-Marne, with 53.61% of the votes in the second round of legislative elections.

In parliament, Gaillot has since been serving as a member of the Committee on Social Affairs Committee, where she focuses on women's rights, education, disability, vocational training and digital. In addition to her committee assignments, she is also a member of the French delegation to the Parliamentary Assembly of the Council of Europe (PACE).

In July 2019, Gaillot voted against the ratification of the CETA: while she welcomed the progress achieved by the majority, she held that the text "does not go in the direction of history" and that global warming should prompt countries to develop short circuits rather than international free trade.

On 9 September 2019, Gaillot announced that she would withdraw from the LREM group in the Assembly and was now sitting among its affiliated members: in a letter, she deplored the vote on "laws restricting individual freedoms". Her apparentment is recorded on 13 September.

In November 2019, Gaillot co-signed a platform with ten other LREM MPs to oppose the government's immigration measures concerning health, including state medical aid (AME), pleading not to give up "To urgency and ease".

Gaillot left LREM temporarily in 2019. In May 2020, she joined seven lawmakers in leaving LREM to join the new Ecology, Democracy, Solidarity group, depriving the president of an outright majority and raising pressure for more left-wing policies. By June, she and five other ex-LREM deputies announced the establishment of #Nous Demain, a "humanist, ecologist and feminist" political movement.

She stood down at the 2022 French legislative election.

== Personal life ==
Married and mother of two, Gaillot lives in Villejuif since 1976. She is involved in the community (cultural, associative and parent of students). Passionate about theater, she followed the workshops of the Romain-Rolland theater in Villejuif before participating in an amateur theater troupe.

== See also ==
- 2017 French legislative election
- Val-de-Marne's 11th constituency
