= Aveyron's 2nd constituency =

Constituency of the National Assembly of France

2nd constituency of Aveyron
- inline Constituency of the National Assembly of France

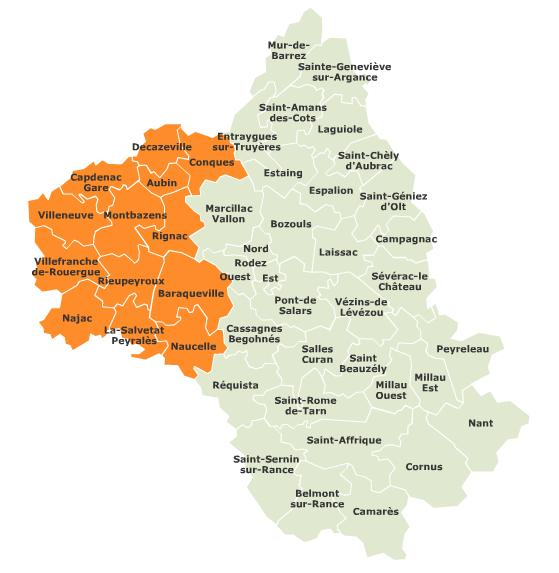
- Constituency in department

- Aveyron in France
- Deputy: Laurent Alexandre; LFI
- Department: Aveyron
- Cantons: Aubin, Baraqueville-Sauveterre, Capdenac-Gare, Conques, Decazeville, Montbazens, Najac, Naucelle, Rieupeyroux, Rignac, La Salvetat-Peyralès, Villefranche-de-Rouergue, Villeneuve

The 2nd constituency of Aveyron is one of the three French National Assembly constituencies in the Aveyron département.

== Deputies ==
Election	Member	Party
1958	Albert Trébosc	CNIP
1962	Robert Fabre	PRRRS
1967	Robert Fabre	PRRRS
1968	Robert Fabre	PRRRS
1972	Robert Fabre	MRG
1973	Robert Fabre	MRG
1978	Robert Fabre	MRG
1980	Jean Rigal	MRG
1981	Jean Rigal	MRG
1986	Proportional representation - no election by constituency	
1988	Jean Rigal	MRG
1993	Serge Roques	UDF
1997	Jean Rigal	PRS
2002	Serge Roques	UMP
2007	Marie-Lou Marcel	PS
2012	Marie-Lou Marcel	PS
2017	Anne Blanc	LREM
2022	Laurent Alexandre	LFI
2024	Laurent Alexandre	LFI

== Election results ==
=== 2024 ===
Candidate	Party	Alliance	First round			Second round		
Candidate	Party	Alliance	Votes	%	+/–	Votes	%	+/–
Laurent Alexandre	LFI	NFP	15,923	33.11	+5.33	24,084	55.69	+4.69
Marie-Christine Parolin	RN		15,738	32.73	+19.90	19,159	44.31	new
Samuel Deguara	RE	Ensemble	14,690	30.55	+7.98	withdrew		
Jean-Philippe Armet	DLF		1,141	2.37	+0.38			
Lucile El Hedri	LO		595	1.24	+0.66			
Votes			48,087	100.00		43,243	100.00	
Valid votes			48,087	95.67	-1.65	43,243	86.42	-3.93
Blank votes			1,393	2.77	+0.99	4,593	9.18	+3.10
Null votes			786	1.56	+0.65	2,200	4.40	+0.73
Turnout			50,266	73.69	+17.35	50,036	73.34	+18.81
Abstentions			17,951	26.31	-17.35	18,185	26.66	-18.81
Registered voters			68,217			68,221		
Result			LFI HOLD					

=== 2022 ===
Legislative Election 2022: Aveyron's 2nd constituency
Party	Candidate	Votes	%	±%
LFI (NUPÉS)	Laurent Alexandre	10,534	27.78	-4.05
PRV (Ensemble)	Samuel Deguara	8,568	22.60	-16.12
LR (UDC)	André At	5,907	15.58	−4.60
RN	Bruno Leleu	4,865	12.83	+4.84
PRG	Eric Cantournet	3,835	10.11	N/A
R!	Florian Barthe	1,300	3.43	N/A
REC	Dominique Duval	1,208	3.19	N/A
Others	N/A	1,701		
Turnout		37,918	56.34	−2.70
2nd round result
LFI (NUPÉS)	Laurent Alexandre	17,354	51.00	N/A
PRV (Ensemble)	Samuel Deguara	16,675	49.00	N/A
Turnout		34,029	54.53	+20.33
LFI gain from LREM				

=== 2017 ===
André At, the Republicans candidate withdrew from the election before the 2nd round.

Candidate	Label	First round		Second round	
Candidate	Label	Votes	%	Votes	%
Anne Blanc	REM	15,563	38.72	16,013	100.00
André At	LR	8,110	20.18		
Pascal Mazet	FI	6,478	16.12		
Bertrand Cavalerie	PS	4,567	11.36		
Bruno Leleu	FN	3,212	7.99		
Guy Pezet	ECO	1,750	4.35		
Philippe Molinié	EXG	274	0.68		
Juliette Goudin	DIV	243	0.60		
Votes		40,197	100.00	16,013	100.00
Valid votes		40,197	97.58	16,013	67.55
Blank votes		655	1.59	5,910	24.93
Null votes		344	0.84	1,783	7.52
Turnout		41,196	59.04	23,706	33.98
Abstentions		28,575	40.96	46,063	66.02
Registered voters		69,771		69,769	
Source: Ministry of the Interior

=== 2012 ===
Summary of the 10 June and 17 June 2012 French legislative in Aveyron’s 2nd Constituency election results
Candidate	Party		1st round		2nd round	
Candidate	Party		Votes	%	Votes	%
Marie-Lou Marcel	Socialist Party	PS	22,441	49.65%	27,468	63.49%
Laurent Tranier	Union for a Popular Movement	UMP	12,416	27.47%	15,798	36.51%
Philippe Bramm	National Front	FN	3,480	7.70%		
Aline Louangvannasy	Left Front	FG	2,904	6.43%		
Jean-Louis Calmettes	The Greens	VEC	1,661	3.68%		
Christophe Pourcel	Radical Party	PRV	1,654	3.66%		
Yann Puech	Far Left	EXG	428	0.95%		
Philippe Molinie	Far Left	EXG	212	0.47%		
Total			45,196	100%	43,266	100%
Registered voters			70,585		70,570	
Blank/Void ballots			1,023	2.21%	1,413	3.16%
Turnout			46,219	65.48%	44,679	63.31%
Abstentions			24,366	34.52%	25,891	36.69%
Result					PS HOLD	

=== 2007 ===
Summary of the 10 June and 17 June 2007 French legislative in Aveyron’s 2nd Constituency election results
Candidate	Party		1st round		2nd round	
Candidate	Party		Votes	%	Votes	%
Marie-Lou Marcel	Socialist Party	PS	10,136	21.57%	24,139	50.61%
Serge Roques	Union for a Popular Movement	UMP	19,036	40.52%	23,554	49.39%
Sophie Renac	Radical Party of the Left	PRG	4,833	10.29%		
Jean-Louis Cance	Democratic Movement	MoDem	3,981	8.47%		
Jean-Pierre Pouzoulet	Miscellaneous Left	DVG	2,751	5.86%		
Jean-Luc Vernhes	Far Left	EXG	1,548	3.29%		
Daniel Gruszka	Communist	COM	1,403	2.99%		
Suzanne Ratel-Sattler	National Front	FN	922	1.96%		
Carine Aubril	Ecologist	ECO	682	1.45%		
Jean-Yves Calmettes	Hunting, Fishing, Nature, Traditions	CPNT	636	1.35%		
Monique Frayssinet	Regionalist	REG	431	0.92%		
Jacques Antonin	Divers	DIV	350	0.74%		
Marie Humbert	Far Left	EXG		%		
Edouard Demarets	Far Right	EXD	0	0.00%		
Total			46,982	100%	47,693	100%
Registered voters			71,709		71,707	
Blank/Void ballots			1,317	2.73%	1,898	3.83%
Turnout			48,299	67.35%	49,591	69.16%
Abstentions			23,410	32.65%	22,116	30.84%
Result					PS GAIN	

=== 2002 ===
Legislative Election 2002: Aveyron's 2nd constituency
Party	Candidate	Votes	%	±%
UMP	Serge Roques	17,398	35.48	N/A
PS	Jean-Pierre Pouzoulet	10,029	20.45	N/A
PRG	Eric Cantournet	7,322	14.93	−29.39
DVD	Claude Gamel	5,156	10.52	N/A
FN	Suzanne Ratel	2,117	4.32	−1.54
PCF	Yves Galan	1,790	3.65	−5.91
LCR	Alain Zarate	1,301	2.65	N/A
Others	N/A	3,918		
Turnout		50,838	70.73	
2nd round result
UMP	Serge Roques	25,184	53.00	N/A
PS	Jean-Pierre Pouzoulet	22,333	47.00	N/A
Turnout		49,534	68.93	
UMP gain from PRG				

=== 1997 ===
Legislative Election 1997: Aveyron's 2nd constituency
Party	Candidate	Votes	%	±%
PRG	Jean Rigal	22,272	44.32	
UDF	Serge Roques	18,365	36.55	
PCF	Patrick Rousseau	4,803	9.56	
FN	André Marcais	2,946	5.86	
MPF	Philippe Jean	1,085	2.16	
DIV	Jérôme Bournazel	780	1.55	
Turnout		53,532	75.25	
2nd round result
PRG	Jean Rigal	30,043	57.15	
UDF	Serge Roques	22,527	42.85	
Turnout		55,303	77.74	
PRG gain from UDF				

== Sources ==
- Official results of French elections from 1998: "Résultats électoraux officiels en France" (in French). Archived from the original on 20 December 2011.
