= Notre Dame de Mongré High School =

Private catholic school in Villefranche-sur-Saône, Rhône, France

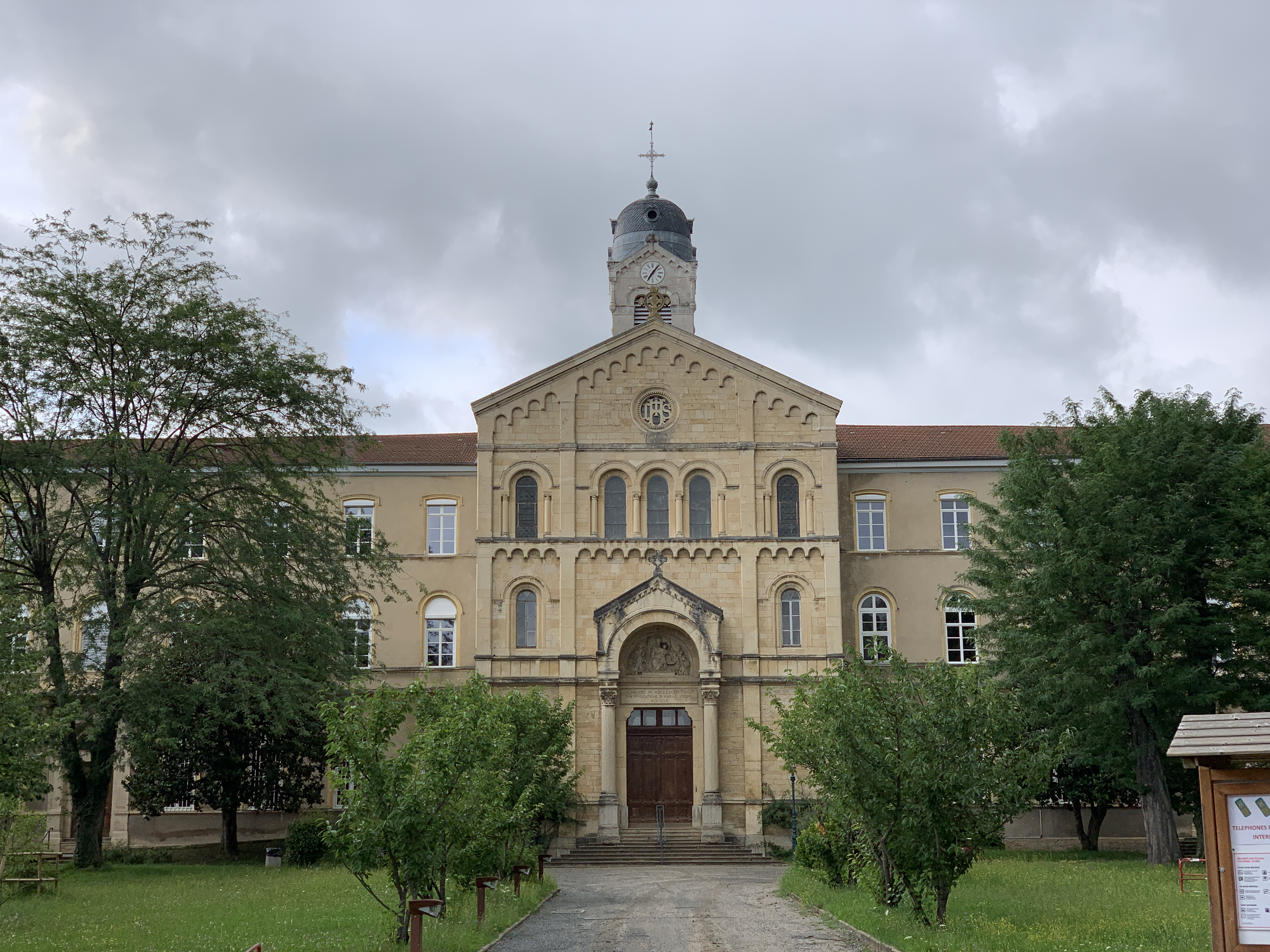

Location
- 276 Avenue Saint-Exupéry; Villefranche-sur-Saône, Rhône 69400; France; 45.9912°N 4.7118°E

Information
- Type: Private elementary and secondary school
- Motto: Christo in Adolescentibus ("For the Christ in Adolescents")
- Religious affiliations: Jesuits; Archdiocese of Lyon
- Denomination: Roman Catholic Church
- Established: 1848; 178 years ago
- Founder: Mademoiselle de La Barmondière
- Principal: Denis Jaillard
- Colors: Blue, red and yellow
- Mascot: Lion
- Accreditation: Assomption France
- Newspaper: Vert Mongré
- Website: www.mongre.org

Notre Dame de Mongré High School is a private Roman Catholic school in Villefranche-sur-Saône, Rhône, France. Located in the Archdiocese of Lyon, the school was founded by Mademoiselle de La Barmondière in 1848 as a Jesuit school.

Mongré currently enrolls just over 2,000 students from elementary school to high school and is proud to achieve high grades and results for the baccalaureat (most of years, 100% of the students pass). A large majority of each graduating class goes on to attend a university or college.

== Alumni ==
- Alexandre Portier
- Henri de Lubac

== See also ==
- Catholic Church in France
- Education in France
- List of Jesuit schools
