= Rhône's 9th constituency =

Constituency of the National Assembly of France

9th constituency of Rhône
- inline Constituency of the National Assembly of France

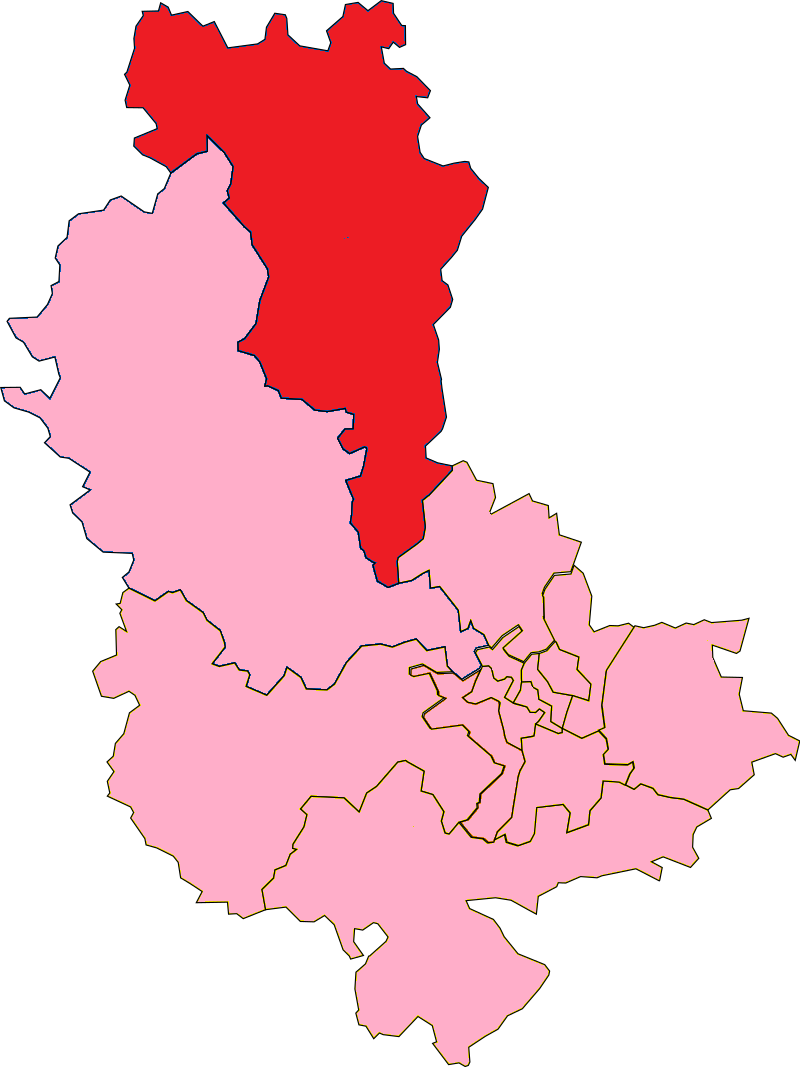
- Rhône's's 9th Constituency shown within Rhône
- Deputy: Alexandre Portier; LR
- Department: Rhône
- Cantons: Anse, Beaujeu, Belleville, Monsols, Villefranche-sur-Saône
- Registered voters: 91683

The 9th constituency of the Rhône (French: Neuvième circonscription du Rhône) is a French legislative constituency in the Rhône département. Like the other 576 French constituencies, it elects one MP using a two round electoral system.

== Description ==
The 9th constituency of the Rhône is one of two relatively large rural seats in the north of the department, along with the Rhône's 8th constituency.

The voters of the 9th have consistently returned conservative deputies to the National Assembly, this seat being one of only two in the department to resist the En Marche! landslide in 2017 by the narrow margin of 51%-49% in the second round. The constituency was held by a member of the Perrut dynasty from 1978 to 2022, with the exception of 1986 to 1988 when proportional representation was used.

== Assembly Members ==
Election	Member	Party
1988	Francisque Perrut	UDF
1993	Francisque Perrut	UDF
1997	Bernard Perrut	UDF
2002	Bernard Perrut	UMP
2007	Bernard Perrut	UMP
2012	Bernard Perrut	UMP
2017	Bernard Perrut	LR
2022	Alexandre Portier	LR
2024	Alexandre Portier	LR
2024	Pascale Bay	LR
2025	Alexandre Portier	LR

== Election results ==
=== 2024 ===
Legislative Election 2024: Rhône's 9th constituency
Party	Candidate	Votes	%	±%
PS (NFP)	Jean-Henri Soumireu-Lartigue	16,066	23.25	N/A
REG	Damien D'autryve	613	0.89	N/A
RE (Ensemble)	Antoine Laurent	9,935	14.38	−7.68
LR (UXD)	Patrick Louis	24,466	35.41	+17.18
LR	Alexandre Portier	17,554	25.40	−2.24
LO	Chantal Helly	464	0.67	N/A
Turnout		69,098	98.23	+49.25
Registered electors		98,123		
2nd round result
LR	Alexandre Portier	40,872	60.37	−1.14
LR (UXD)	Patrick Louis	26,836	39.63	N/A
Turnout		67,708	96.79	+54.86
Registered electors		98,153		
LR hold				

=== 2022 ===
Legislative Election 2022: Rhone's 9th constituency
Party	Candidate	Votes	%	±%
LR (UDC)	Alexandre Portier	12,885	27.64	-1.47
LREM (Ensemble)	Ambroise Méjean	10,284	22.06	-13.96
LFI (NUPÉS)	Mylène Dune	9,437	20.24	+8.09
RN	Rémi Berthoux	8,500	18.23	+2.64
REC	Claire De Guernon	2,473	5.31	N/A
DVE	Elodie Perrichon	1,344	2.88	N/A
Others	N/A	1,691	-	−
Turnout		46,614	48.98	+0.35
2nd round result
LR (UDC)	Alexandre Portier	22,385	61.51	+10.51
LREM (Ensemble)	Ambroise Méjean	14,010	38.49	−10.51
Turnout		36,395	41.93	+1.23
LR hold				

=== 2017 ===
Legislative Election 2017: Rhône's 9th constituency
Party	Candidate	Votes	%	±%
LREM	Marion Croizeau	16,059	36.02	
LR	Bernard Perrut	12,978	29.11	
FN	Christophe Boudot	6,952	15.59	
LFI	Teresa Caci	3,517	7.89	
EELV	Brigitte Ealet	1,313	2.94	
PRG	Katia Buisson	1,174	2.63	
Others	N/A	2,593		
Turnout		44,586	48.63	
2nd round result
LR	Bernard Perrut	19,029	51.00	
LREM	Marion Croizeau	18,284	49.00	
Turnout		37,313	40.70	
LR hold				

=== 2012 ===
Legislative Election 2012: Rhône's 9th constituency
Party	Candidate	Votes	%	±%
UMP	Bernard Perrut	18,508	37.59	
EELV	Vincent Meyer	12,057	24.49	
FN	Julien Rochedy	8,714	17.70	
DVD	Frédéric Miguet	5,408	10.98	
FG	Danielle Lebail	2,543	5.17	
Others	N/A	2,004		
Turnout		49,234	57.29	
2nd round result
UMP	Bernard Perrut	27,244	61.84	
EELV	Vincent Meyer	16,813	38.16	
Turnout		44,057	51.26	
UMP hold				

=== 2007 ===
Legislative Election 2007: Rhône's 9th constituency
Party	Candidate	Votes	%	±%
UMP	Bernard Perrut	25,888	55.75	
PS	Jérôme Saddier	7,735	16.66	
FN	Jean-Pierre Barbier	3,875	8.34	
MoDem	Alexandre Chavanne	3,640	7.84	
LV	Jean-Michel Rival	1,389	2.99	
PCF	Danielle Lebail-Coquet	1,018	2.19	
Others	N/A	2,001		
Turnout		47,040	58.31	
UMP hold				

=== 2002 ===
Legislative Election 2002: Rhône's 9th constituency
Party	Candidate	Votes	%	±%
UMP	Bernard Perrut	18,381	40.51	
FN	Jean-Pierre Barbier	9,982	22.00	
PS	Jean-Pierre Payraud	7,461	16.44	
DVD	Bernard Fialaire	4,412	9.72	
LV	Marguerite Chichereau	1,169	2.58	
PCF	Alain Galland	1,063	2.34	
Others	N/A	2,903		
Turnout		46,075	63.42	
2nd round result
UMP	Bernard Perrut	26,315	73.20	
FN	Jean-Pierre Barbier	9,632	26.80	
Turnout		38,759	53.35	
UMP gain from UDF				

=== 1997 ===
Legislative Election 1997: Rhône's 9th constituency
Party	Candidate	Votes	%	±%
UDF	Bernard Perrut	11,671	26.91	
FN	Jean-Pierre Barbier	11,320	26.10	
PRG	Christian Vandendriessche	6,984	16.10	
UDF	Bernard Fialaire*	5,167	11.91	
PCF	Michel Labail	2,730	6.30	
DVE	Sylvie Goutte	1,696	3.91	
DVD	Didier Bererd	1,323	3.05	
Far left	Jacqueline Cornut	971	2.24	
Others	N/A	1,505		
Turnout		45,497	66.61	
2nd round result
UDF	Bernard Perrut	26,485	65.26	
FN	Jean-Pierre Barbier	14,099	34.74	
Turnout		46,152	67.57	
UDF hold				

* UDF dissident
