= Malek Boutih =

French retired politician and activist

Member of the National Assembly for Essonne's 10th constituency
- In office 17 June 2012 – 20 June 2017
- Preceded by: Julien Dray
- Succeeded by: Pierre-Alain Raphan

Personal details
- Born: 27 October 1964 (age 61) Neuilly-sur-Seine, France
- Party: Socialist Party
- Education: École supérieure de journalisme de Paris

Abdelmalek "Malek" Boutih (French pronunciation: [malɛk buˈti]; born 27 October 1964) is a French retired politician and activist who served as a member of the National Assembly from 2012 to 2017, representing the Essonne department. He previously was the Socialist Party's National Secretary for Social Issues (French: Secrétaire national chargé des questions de société) from 2003 to 2008.

He also has had a long association with SOS Racisme, a civil rights organisation with close ties to the Socialist Party. He joined in 1984 while a student at the University of Nanterre and served as vice president from 1985 to 1992 and as president from 1999 to 2003. President Nicolas Sarkozy asked him to enter the French Government in 2007 but he refused, preferring to focus on his social activism.

== Early life and education ==
Malek Boutih was born in a clinic in the wealthy neighbourhood of Neuilly-sur-Seine, although his family did not live there. He later chose to return to Neuilly-sur-Seine to attend La Folie-Saint-James high school (lycée). He was born of Algerian parents from Kabylie. His father was an FLN sympathiser and after independence, his parents went to France seeking work. His father worked in the building industry and his mother as a cleaner. At the age of 9 months old he contracted poliomyelitis while his family was living in the slums of Nanterre, and later, Boulogne-Billancourt. He endured multiple operations until the age of 12 years. As a Deputy, he gave financial support to the Antony rehabilitation centre where he was cared for as a child.

== Activism ==
At the beginning of his study of Law at the University of Nanterre and at the École supérieure de journalism de Paris, he became involved in activism and community work. In 1983 he took part in the March for Equality and Against Racism. Joining SOS Racisme in 1984, he became its vice-president from 1985 to 1992 and founded the Grigny Maison des Potes ("mate's house" — emergency accommodation) and the Banlieues du Monde association. He was editor-in-chief of the newspaper Pote à Pote ("Mate to Mate") for several years.

On 6 February 1990, he appeared on the TV talk show Ciel, mon mardi !, a program that specialised in confrontation between people with opposing views.

His time as head of SOS Racisme was marked by the creation of the discrimination test and the first convictions in cases against racial discrimination in employment, housing and entry to night clubs. His greatest triumph being the validation of the use of discrimination tests by the Court of Cassation. In the fight against racism and its rooks, he focussed on education at tackled urban ghettos with two priorities: mixing the population and fighting against violence. Finally, in 2002 he was one of the first to sound the alarm on the rise of antisemitism in France, in the guise of anti-Zionism.

A regular critic of its elder, rival anti-racism organisation MRAP, in 2003 Malek Boutih declared "that there are several kinds of anti-racism in France, notable that of MRAP who march to cries of 'Death to the Jews!'". In September 2006, he was convicted, fined €1,000 and order to pay €1 damages by the Paris tribunal correctionel for defamation of MRAP.

He takes a position against separatism, ghetto mentality and positive discrimination. He states:

In France, minorities do not exist! We are not a threatened species. And if we [all] start speaking Arabic or Mandingo, or Breton or Corsican we will break apart the national community. France is the baguette, wine, cheese and now couscous, as well as 'Liberty, Equality, Fraternity'. Two hundred years ago we got a head start in creating a political, rather than ethnic, national identity.

For Malek Boutih, the children of immigrants have taken root in French society. They are French. To affirm that national identity is a sort of political rallying cry for that generation. Thus he hopes to persuade young people who are French, but have been convinced by the signals they are given (they are blacks, they are Arabs [Beurs]...) that they are not French, indeed they cannot even claim to be. According to him, France must finally recognize that integration has well and truly taken place and the country is now of mixed blood. He condemns religious extremism.

During his time as head of SOS Racisme, he conducted an ongoing fight against violence in poor suburbs which he branded "self-destructive and nihilist" in his Propositions pour un véritable Plan Marshall pour les Banlieues ("Proposals for a real Marshall Plan for the Suburbs") because it was preventing the emancipation of a generation and could only end in failure. He refused to support violence as being the only response to marginalisation and preferred political, trade-union and community actions. Only the political commitment of that generation would allow the spiral of violence to end, according to him, and along with it the ethnic and geographic discrimination they suffered.

== Politics ==
A member of the Socialist Party since 1986, when his leadership of SOS Racisme ended he was appointed to the party's national hierarchy at the 2003 Congress of Dijon as National Secretary for Social Issues, a post that did not previously exist, despite never having had an elected position. The post was renewed at the Le Mans Congress in 2005. He had responsibility for immigration, the fight against racism, AIDS and drug addiction.

He wrote a report on immigration, Une nouvelle politique de l'immigration (2004) ("A new politics of immigration"), called for by the national leadership of the party to define an official line on the subject. His goal was to convince the public that immigration was an essential contribution to France when it was properly controlled and organised. He declared himself in favour of quotas in line with a strategy of codevelopment creating a legal stream of immigration and regulating flows of migrants. This report was distributed by the Socialist Party leadership.

Following the Le Mans Congress, faced with a social crisis and questions of national identity, he defended the ideal of a "mixed-blood Republic" (République métissée). According to him,

It is the mixed-blood Republic that must be the new flag to unite the whole French population, which can make our nation not one that is pointed out because of its unrest, but as a country that, true to its historic tradition, again opens a new page of history which enables bringing people together,…which will lead to a hope in the world which will be an alternative to that shock of civilisations, to the technicalities of religions, to the shock of difference, but more than that to a convergence of aspirations.

Effectively he believes that the Republic is an idea that cannot remain fixed and that it should lean towards an ideal which "brings together the tradition of all that is best in French history, Republican history, but which also looks to the future, which accepts France's place in the world, which accepts the new generations of French people, which accepts diversity not as a handicap but as a treasure".

In his report on drug addiction, Cannabis : contrôler l'usage pour protéger les citoyens (2006) ("Cannabis: Controlling usage to protect citizens"), Malek Boutih advocates taking public control of the market so as to combat the mafia, cannabis being, according to him, "the cornerstone of ghettoisation and insecurity in working-class neighbourhoods". This idea was taken into the platform of the Socialist Party in 2007 in the form of "public regulation".

Close to Julien Dray, also a former member of SOS Racisme, he supported Ségolène Royal as Socialist Party candidate in the 2007 French Presidential election. The new President, Nicolas Sarkozy, asked him to join his government, which he refused to do, affirming that there was no question of him "taking responsibilities in this government", all the while underlining "the reciprocal respect" which characterised his relationship with Nicolas Sarkozy.

He was not reappointed to the National Secretariat of the party in December 2008 and was summoned on 25 January 2009 by Pouria Amirshahi to clarify his attitude after his criticisms of the party's plan for the 2008 financial crisis and his numerous accolades of Nicolas Sarkozy. "Malek Boutih should choose which side he's on."

=== 2007 Legislative elections ===
Malek Boutih was chosen as candidate for the Charente's 4th constituency in the 2007 Legislative elections on 1 July 2006 at the national congress of the Socialist Party.

Almost all of the elected Socialists in the department made publicly known their hostility to his candidature and their willingness to block him since he was parachuted into the position. The First Federal Secretary had effectively organised a consultative vote in the constituency between candidates Martine Pinville and Jeanne Filloux, before Malek Boutih's appointment. Selected by the local party members, Martine Pinville chose to keep her candidature with the official support of the Socialist Party, thus she was excluded at the national committee meeting of 22 May 2007, along with her alternate candidate, the outgoing Socialist deputy Jean-Claude Beauchaud.

Boutih was eliminated in the first round of the elections, coming third with 15.65% of the vote (9.54% of enrolled voters, although 12.5% was needed to progress to the second round), behind the UMP Mayor of Angoulême, Philippe Mottet (35.58% of the vote) and the dissident Socialist Martine Pinville (21.04%, 13% of enrolled voters). Boutih singled out the First Secretary François Hollande, accusing him of "throwing him to the wolves". In the second round, the Socialist Party supported Martine Pinville who was elected with 57.03% of the vote.

He felt that he had been beaten by his own party and severely criticised its leaders "who formed a clique that disliked society as it was, who cannot see themselves as part of it and who cling to the melancholy of the 1970s. Where we come from it's Good Bye Lenin!" He rebuked them for having skimmed over the debate on diversity and not having taken it up seriously, like other subjects of real concern to French people: violence, work, the right to social emancipation, identity.

=== 2012 Legislative elections ===
Malek Boutih was chosen as a candidate in Essonne's 10th constituency following a vote of party members. He began his campaign using the words and images of Jean-Luc Mélenchon and in his campaign materials, despite Mélenchon supporting François Delapierre, the candidate for the Left Front in the same constituency. He led in the first round on 10 June 2012 with 34.56% of the vote and was elected on 17 June with 56.84% of the vote against the Radical Party candidate, Marianne Duranton (43.16%).

=== Jihadism in France ===
In February 2015 the Prime Minister Manuel Valls named Malek Boutih as parliamentarian assigned to consider the analysis and prevention of "new generations turning to terrorism in connection with jihadist networks". This report was handed over in June 2015, titled Génération radicale ("Radical Generation"). One of its major conclusions was:

We no longer have the right to doubt, to quibble, to weigh up. The time has come for determined action to enforce the Republican project… Public action in response to radicalism must be part of a plan of counter-attack, giving the Republic all of its strength and all of its appeal.

Warmly welcomed by members of the opposition, but more discretely by the Socialist majority, this report was criticised especially for its sources, such as Frigid Barjot and for the prominence granted to Pierre Bellanger, founder and CEO of radio station Skyrock where Boutih worked as Manager of Institutional Relations. For Libération the report "caricatures young people as thirsty for recognition, radicalised and inured to violence" and the daily laughs at certain suggestions such as creating "night clubs run by associations and publicly financed" to avoid people being turned away.

=== Socialist Primary and 2017 Legislative election ===
In between the two rounds of the Socialist Party Primary to select a Presidential candidate, Malek Boutih vehemently attacked Benoît Hamon maintaining that he would be "in harmony with an Islamo-Leftist fringe [to whom] he would make a discreet electoral appeal" and branded him the candidate for Indigènes de la République (an anti-racist, anti-colonial, anti-Zionist party accused of racism, antisemitism, homophobia and antifeminism). These remarks divided the supporters of Manuel Valls.

On 30 March, he announced on Europe 1 that he would support the candidate for En Marche!, Emmanuel Macron, from the first round of the presidential election.

In anticipation of the 2017 Legislative elections, he sought nomination as a candidate for La République en marche !. The nomination was refused and he competed in the election as an independent. He was eliminated in the first round with 12.39% of the vote.

== Other posts and honours ==
Malek Boutih is also an administrator of the Collège des personnalités qualifiées du Paris Saint-Germain.

He is Manager of Institutional Relations at the radio station Skyrock.

He received the medal of a knight of the National Order of Merit in 2001. In 2003, he received the prize awarded by the Senate for 'political discovery of the year'.

He personally supports the Geneva Initiative, an alternative peace plan envisaging the creation of a Palestinian state alongside Israel.

In 2016, he received the Prix de la laïcité ("Secular Prize").

== Publications ==
- Mon parcours ("My journey"), available on his website.
- La France aux Français ? Chiche ! ("France for the French? I dare you!"), with Élisabeth Lévy, Éditions Mille et une nuits, 2001 ISBN 978-2-84205-564-6.
