= Essonne's 10th constituency =

Constituency of the National Assembly of France

10th constituency of Essonne
- inline Constituency of the National Assembly of France

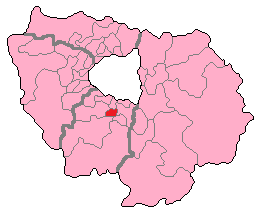
- Essonne's 10th Constituency shown within Île-de-France
- Deputy: Antoine Léaument; LFI
- Department: Essonne
- Cantons: Grigny, Morsang-sur-Orge, Sainte-Geneviève-des-Bois, Saint-Michel-sur-Orge.
- Registered voters: 60,911

The 10th constituency of Essonne is a French legislative constituency in the Essonne département.

== Description ==
The 10th constituency of Essonne was one of six additional seats created in 1988 to address the rising population in the department. It is a dense urban seat on the southern edge of the Paris urban area around 15 miles (24 km) from the city centre.

The seat consistently supported the Socialist Party at every election from its creation in 1988 until 2017, when it was won by the centrist LREM party. It swung back left in 2022, when it was gained by the left-wing LFI party.

== Historic representation ==
Election	Member	Party
1988	Julien Dray	PS
1993	Julien Dray	PS
1997	Julien Dray	PS
2002	Julien Dray	PS
2007	Julien Dray	PS
2012	Malek Boutih	PS
2017	Pierre-Alain Raphan	LREM
2022	Antoine Léaument	LFI

== Election results ==
=== 2024 ===
Candidate	Party	Alliance	First round			Second round		
Candidate	Party	Alliance	Votes	%	+/–	Votes	%	+/–
Antoine Léaument	LFI	NFP	16,242	43.01	+5.74	22,556	65.16	+9.95
Michael Amand	RN		9,784	25.91	+10.47	12,061	34.84	N/A
Alexandra Monet	HOR	ENS	7,137	18.90	-7.31			
Nicolas de Boishue	DVD		2,207	5.84	N/A			
Thierry Deneuve	DVE		694	1.84	N/A			
Kamel Kecer	DIV		622	1.65	N/A			
Stéphanie Hamon	REC		373	0.90	-2.77			
Monique Leclerc	LO		317	0.84	-0.21			
Willy Deckel	DIV		257	0.68	N/A			
Joël Mando	DIV		70	0.19	N/A			
Mihala Kabama	DIV		60	0.16	N/A			
Valid votes			37,763	97.57	-0.24	34,617	90.93	-2.71
Blank votes			596	1.54	±0.00	2,749	7.22	+2.90
Null votes			344	0.89	+0.24	703	1.85	-0.19
Turnout			38,703	61.61	+18.84	38,069	60.57	+18.90
Abstentions			24,121	38.39	-18.84	24,783	39.43	-18.90
Registered voters			62,824			62,852		
Source: Ministry of the Interior, Le Monde
Result						LFI HOLD		

=== 2022 ===
Legislative Election 2022: Essonne's 10th constituency
Party	Candidate	Votes	%	±%
LFI (NUPÉS)	Antoine Léaument	9,640	37.27	-6.31
LREM (Ensemble)	Nadia Carcasset	6,779	26.21	-0.47
RN	Marie Godier	3,994	15.44	+4.72
LR (UDC)	Nicolas De Boishue	2,068	8.00	−6.13
REC	Inès Vera-Fontano	948	3.67	N/A
DVE	Hanna Rehab	655	2.53	N/A
DVE	Mustapha Zaoui	528	2.04	N/A
Others	N/A	1,250		
Turnout		26,440	42.77	−0.87
2nd round result
LFI (NUPÉS)	Antoine Léaument	13,321	55.21	+8.63
LREM (Ensemble)	Nadia Carcasset	10,809	44.79	−8.63
Turnout		24,130	41.67	+7.44
LFI gain from LREM				

=== 2017 ===
Legislative Election 2017: Essonne's 10th constituency
Party	Candidate	Votes	%	±%
LREM	Pierre-Alain Raphan	7,093	26.68	
LFI	Charlotte Girard	4,134	15.55	
UDI	Marianne Duranton	3,755	14.13	
PS	Malek Boutih	3,294	12.39	
FN	Lucie Dedi	2,850	10.72	
PCF	Philippe Rio	2,849	10.72	
EELV	Isabelle Catrain	1,307	4.92	
DLF	Valérie Fleury	803	3.02	
Others	N/A	499		
Turnout		26,584	43.64	
2nd round result
LREM	Pierre-Alain Raphan	11,138	53.42	
LFI	Charlotte Girard	9,713	46.58	
Turnout		20,851	34.23	
LREM gain from PS		Swing		

=== 2012 ===
Legislative Election 2012: Essonne's 10th constituency
Party	Candidate	Votes	%	±%
PS	Malek Boutih	10,914	34.56	
PRV	Marianne Duranton	5,976	18.92	
FG	François Delapierre	5,261	16.66	
FN	Gaël Fouilleul	4,920	15.58	
DVD	Thomas Zlowodzki	1,656	5.24	
EELV	Christian Soubra	1,102	3.49	
MoDem	Serge Gaubier	800	2.53	
Others	N/A	949		
Turnout		31,578	52.05	
2nd round result
PS	Malek Boutih	16,655	56.84	
PRV	Marianne Duranton	12,649	43.16	
Turnout		29,304	48.30	
PS hold				

=== 2007 ===
Legislative Election 2007: Essonne's 10th constituency
Party	Candidate	Votes	%	±%
UMP	Laurence Gaudin	12,475	36.12	
PS	Julien Dray	11,350	32.86	
PCF	Patrick Bardon	3,495	10.12	
MoDem	Jean-Bernard Mirabeau	2,454	7.11	
FN	Michel De Rostolan	1,403	4.06	
LV	Amandine Thiriet	953	2.76	
Others	N/A	2,407		
Turnout		35,029	57.64	
2nd round result
PS	Julien Dray	18,183	53.48	
UMP	Laurence Gaudin	15,819	46.52	
Turnout		34,898	57.43	
PS hold				

=== 2002 ===
Legislative Election 2002: Essonne's 10th constituency
Party	Candidate	Votes	%	±%
PS	Julien Dray	10,946	32.67	
UMP	Francis Decoux	9,104	27.17	
FN	Michel De Rostolan	4,240	12.66	
PCF	Marjolaine Rauze	3,360	10.03	
RPF	Jacques Dupuy	1,883	5.62	
LV	Angeline Fendian	1,064	3.18	
PR	Dominique Mellet	738	2.20	
Others	N/A	2,169		
Turnout		34,068	62.29	
2nd round result
PS	Julien Dray	16,158	53.04	
UMP	Francis Decoux	14,303	46.96	
Turnout		31,611	57.83	
PS hold				

=== 1997 ===
Legislative Election 1997: Essonne's 10th constituency
Party	Candidate	Votes	%	±%
PS	Julien Dray	10,549	30.41	
UDF	Antoine Charrin	7,839	22.60	
PCF	Claude Vasquez	5,957	17.17	
FN	Michel De Rostolan	5,856	16.88	
Far left	Gérard Pociceka	1,292	3.72	
LO	Roland Hautin	1,046	3.02	
DVD	Thierry Claudel	1,027	2.96	
Others	N/A	1,125		
Turnout		36,239	65.01	
2nd round result
PS	Julien Dray	20,742	58.55	
UDF	Antoine Charrin	14,682	41.45	
Turnout		37,650	67.56	
PS hold				

== Sources ==
Official results of French elections from 2002: "Résultats électoraux officiels en France" (in French).
