= Pierre-Alain Raphan =

French politician

Member of the National Assembly for Essonne's 10th constituency
- In office 21 June 2017 – 21 June 2022
- Preceded by: Malek Boutih
- Succeeded by: Antoine Léaument

Personal details
- Born: 6 April 1983 (age 43) Choisy-le-Roi, France
- Party: Territories of Progress; Renaissance
- Education: Gustave Eiffel University

Pierre-Alain Raphan (born 6 April 1983) is a French accountant and politician representing En Marche. He was elected to the French National Assembly on 18 June 2017, representing the 10th constituency of the department of Essonne.

In parliament, Raphan serves on the Committee on Cultural Affairs and Education. He is also a member of the French Parliamentary Friendship Group with Azerbaijan. In 2020, Raphan joined En commun (EC), a group within LREM led by Barbara Pompili.

He stood down at the 2022 French legislative election, and was succeeded as MP by Antoine Léaument from La France Insoumise.

== See also ==
- 2017 French legislative election
