= Élisabeth Lévy =

French journalist, essayist and editor (born 1964)

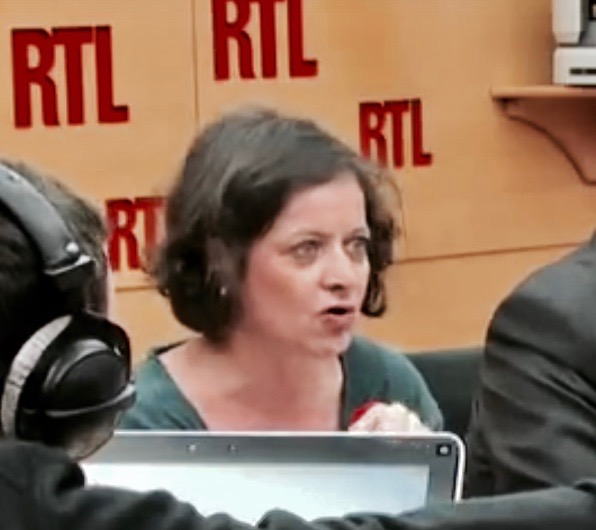
- Élisabeth Lévy on RTL in 2019
- Born: 16 February 1964 (age 62); Marseille, France
- Education: Sciences Po
- Occupations: Journalist polemist

Élisabeth Lévy (born 16 February 1964) is a French journalist, polemicist, essayist and editor in chief of Causeur.

== Biography ==
She was born in Marseille, the daughter of a general practitioner and a pharmacist, both of whom were of Sephardic Jewish ancestry. She grew up in Épinay-sur-Seine and studied at Sciences Po. She worked for the Agence France-Presse (AFP) and for Jeune Afrique. She later joined L’Événement du jeudi, and Marianne and, after being dismissed by Jean-François Kahn in 1998, began writing for Le Figaro. In 2005, Le Premier Pouvoir, a programme she presented on France Culture devoted to media analysis, was cancelled. Guests had included Jean Baudrillard, and Peter Sloterdijk. In 2007 she co-founded Causeur, a magazine whose annual losses are offset by support from far-right stakeholders like Gérald Penciolelli.

== Controversies ==
=== Climate change denial ===
During a heated discussion with Claire Nouvain on CNews, where Lévy is a regular guest, she vaunted her skepticism as a healthy scientific posture concerning the role of humanity in global warming.

=== Proximity to Great Replacement theorists ===
In 2017, she interviewed Alain Finkielkraut, concerning Renaud Camus's Great Replacement theory and in 2021 published a two-part interview with Camus himself.

In September 2021, the cover of Causeur showing a picture of five Black or mixed-ancestry babies captioned "Smile, you're great-replaced" was a reference to this conspiracy theory. The cover sparked a wave of indignation, inspiring condemnation from the MRAP and many politicians, including former interior minister Christophe Castaner.

Élisabeth Moreno, the Minister for Gender Equality, Diversity and Equal Opportunities, called it "unabashed racism" and announced that the government had alerted the Paris prosecutor's office.

=== Prostitution ===
In October 2013, Causeur published a petition in favor of prostitution called the "Manifesto of the 343 bastards" to fight against a bill aiming to penalize clients of prostitution. She defended the title as a humorous way of treating a serious issue (it was a play on a Charlie Hebdo political cartoon about the 1971 Manifesto of the 343).

=== Kosovo war ===
In 2000, she contested the number of casualties by Serbians during the Kosovo War.

== Books ==
All in French.

- Malek Boutih (coauthor), La France aux Français ? Chiche ! : un entretien mené par Élisabeth Lévy / Malek Boutih, Paris, Fondation du 2-Mars et Éditions Mille et une nuits, coll. « Essai », 2001, 97 p. (ISBN 2-84205-564-0)
- Les maîtres censeurs : pour en finir avec la pensée unique, Paris, Librairie générale française, coll. « Le livre de poche » (no 15282), 2002, 408 p. (ISBN 2-253-15282-X) – Prix François-Victor-Noury de l’Institut de France.
- Lucien Israël (author) (pref. Alain Besançon), Les dangers de l’euthanasie : entretiens avec Élisabeth Lévy / Lucien Israël, Paris, Éd. des Syrtes, 2002, 153 p. (ISBN 2-84545-051-6)
- Philippe Muray (coauthor), Festivus festivus : conversations avec Élisabeth Lévy / Philippe Muray, Paris, Fayard, 2005, 485 p. (ISBN 2-213-62129-2)
- Alain Finkielkraut (coauthor) and Rony Brauman (coauthor), La discorde : Israël-Palestine, les Juifs, la France : conversations avec Élisabeth Lévy / Rony Brauman, Alain Finkielkraut, Paris, Mille et une nuits, 2006, 375 p. (ISBN 2-84205-812-7)
- Le premier pouvoir : inventaire après liquidation, Paris, Climats, 2007, 164 p. (ISBN 978-2-08-120068-5)
- Notre métier a mal tourné : deux journalistes s’énervent, Paris, Mille et une nuits, 2008, 232 p. (ISBN 978-2-7555-0041-7)
- Robert Ménard (coauthor), Les Français sont-ils antisémites ?, Paris, Éditions Mordicus, 2009, 103 p. (ISBN 978-2-918414-16-2)
- La gauche contre le réel, Paris, Fayard, 2012, 319 p. (ISBN 978-2-7555-0041-7)
- Les rien-pensants, éditions du Cerf, 2017

== In popular culture ==
- Il n'y a personne dans les tombes, by François Taillandier, Stock, 2007
- Une belle époque, by Christian Authier, Stock, 2008: as Isabelle Laval
- Ticket d'entrée, by Joseph Macé-Scaron, Grasset, 2011 : as Sarah Berg
