= Marie-Lou Marcel =

French politician

Marie-Lou Marcel (born 21 August 1953) was a member of the National Assembly of France. She represented Aveyron's 2nd constituency from 2007 to 2017, as a member of the Socialiste, radical, citoyen et divers gauche.
