= Jean-Yves Le Bouillonnec =

French politician

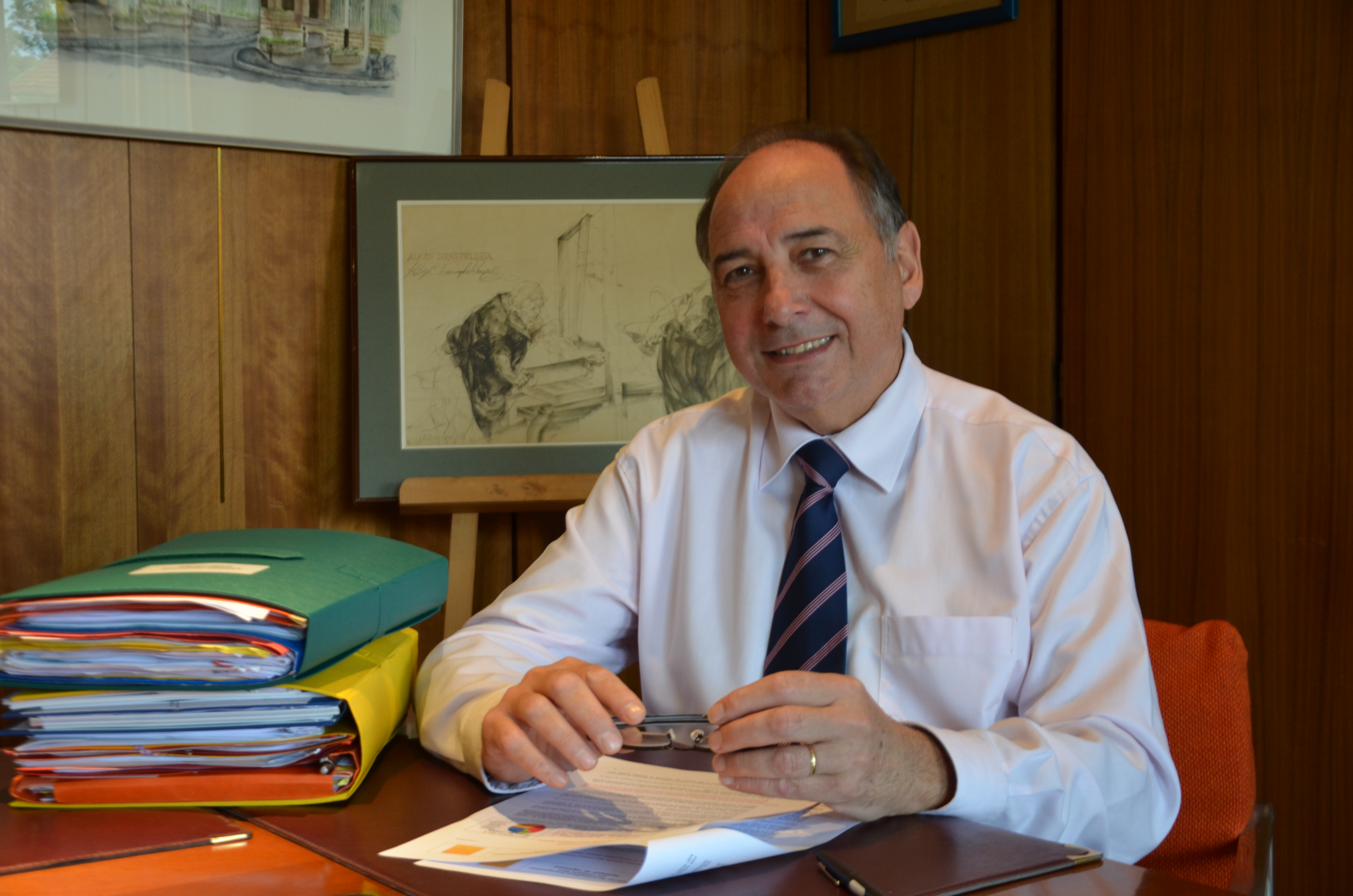
Jean-YvesLeBouillonnec

Jean-Yves Le Bouillonnec (born 15 September 1950) was a member of the National Assembly of France. He represented Val-de-Marne's 11th constituency from 2002 to 2017, as a member of the Socialiste, radical, citoyen et divers gauche.
