= Bernard Perrut =

French politician

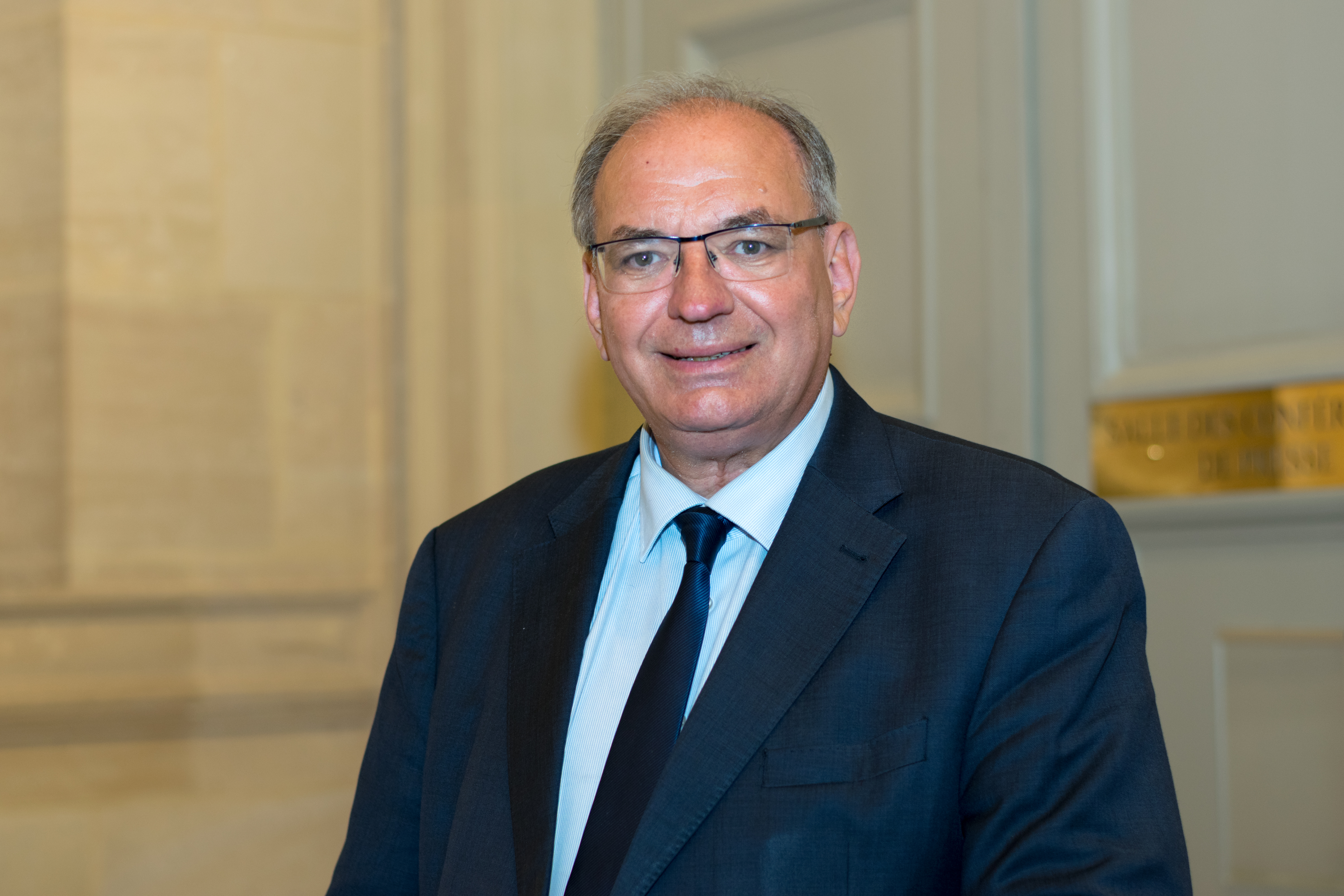

Member of the National Assembly for Rhône's 9th constituency
- In office 12 June 1997 – 21 June 2022
- Preceded by: Francisque Perrut
- Succeeded by: Alexandre Portier

Personal details
- Born: 24 January 1957 (age 69) Villefranche-sur-Saône, Rhône, France
- Party: Republican
- Other political affiliations: UDF (1997-1998); DL (1998-2002); UMP (2002-2015)

Bernard Perrut (born 24 January 1957 in Villefranche-sur-Saône, Rhône, France) is a French politician who served as a deputy of the National Assembly of France, representing the Rhône's 9th constituency from 1997 to 2022. A member of the Republicans, he previously was the mayor of Villefranche-sur-Saône from 2008 to 2017.
