= Val-de-Marne's 11th constituency =

Constituency of the National Assembly of France

11th constituency of Val-de-Marne
- inline Constituency of the National Assembly of France

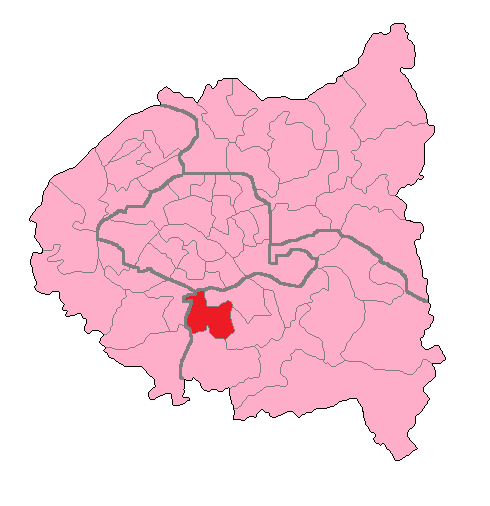
- Val-de-Marne's 11th Constituency shown within Île-de-France
- Deputy: Sophie Taillé-Polian; G.s
- Department: Val-de-Marne
- Cantons: Arcueil - Cachan - Villejuif-Est - Villejuif-Ouest
- Registered voters: 62,446

The 11th constituency of Val-de-Marne is a French legislative constituency in the Val-de-Marne département.

== Description ==
The 11th constituency of Val-de-Marne lies in the north east of the department and is largely made up of the suburb of Villejuif.

Similarly to the neighbouring Val-de-Marne's 10th constituency the seat was held for many years by the French Communist Party; however, it was captured by the Socialist Party (France) at the 2002 election. Also like Val-de-Marne's 10th constituency two left wing candidates qualified for the second round and so the second place Left Party candidate withdrew leaving Jean-Yves Le Bouillonnec without an opponent.

On September 9, 2019, Albane Gaillot left the LREM party, then in March 2020, she left the LREM group and became non-registered (deputies who are neither members nor related to a parliamentary group of the National Assembly), then in May 2020, she was one of the 17 initial members of the Ecology Democracy Solidarity group.

== Deputies ==
Election	Member	Party
1986	Proportional representation – no election by constituency	
1988	Georges Marchais	PCF
1993	Georges Marchais	PCF
1997	Claude Billard	PCF
2002	Jean-Yves Le Bouillonnec	PS
2007	Jean-Yves Le Bouillonnec	PS
2012	Jean-Yves Le Bouillonnec	PS
2017	Albane Gaillot	LREM
2020	Albane Gaillot	EDS
2022	Sophie Taillé-Polian	G.s

== Election results ==
=== 2024 ===
Candidate	Party	Alliance	First round			Second round		
Candidate	Party	Alliance	Votes	%	+/–	Votes	%	+/–
Sophie Taillé-Polian	G.s	NFP	24,447	57.36	+2.00			
Nathalie Picot	RE	ENS	8,494	19.93	-5.46			
Sylvie Bouchot	RN		6,093	14.30	+5.97			
Cédric Rivet-Sow	DVD		1,504	3.53	N/A			
Charles Mariaud	DIV		1,167	2.74	N/A			
Lydie Cousty	REC		452	1.06	-2.53			
Christine Samson	LO		319	0.75	-0.35			
Sébastien Sugranes	NPA		146	0.34	N/A			
Valid votes			42,622	98.15	+0.24			
Blank votes			587	1.35	-0.29			
Null votes			217	0.50	+0.05			
Turnout			43,426	65.74	+18.29			
Abstentions			22,634	34.26	-18.29			
Registered voters			66,060					
Source: Ministry of the Interior, Le Monde
Result						G.s HOLD		

=== 2022 ===
Legislative Election 2022: Val-de-Marne's 11th constituency
Party	Candidate	Votes	%	±%
G.s (NUPÉS)	Sophie Taillé-Polian	14,739	48.83	+5.74
LREM (Ensemble)	Erwann Calvez	7,663	25.39	-8.23
RN	Martina Gabelica	2,514	8.33	+1.76
LR (UDC)	Mahrouf Bounegta	1,142	3.78	−6.39
REC	Sarah Milamon	1,085	3.59	N/A
DVG	Maryvonne Rocheteau	1,080	3.58	N/A
DVG	Jean Couthures	889	2.95	N/A
Others	N/A	1,071		
Turnout		30,828	47.45	+1.34
2nd round result
G.s (NUPÉS)	Sophie Taillé-Polian	17,977	63.32	+16.93
LREM (Ensemble)	Erwann Calvez	10,413	36.68	−16.93
Turnout		28,390	45.96	+8.59
G.s gain from LREM				

=== 2017 ===
Legislative Election 2017: Val-de-Marne's 11th constituency
Party	Candidate	Votes	%	±%
LREM	Albane Gaillot	9,681	33.62	N/A
LFI	Djamel Arrouche	4,713	16.37	N/A
LR	Audrey Gaudron	2,901	10.08	−6.79
PS	Hélène De Comarmond	2,620	9.10	−32.07
EELV	Marianne Jaouen	2,542	8.83	+3.58
PCF	Catherine Dos Santos	2,532	8.79	−10.21
FN	Alexandre Gaborit	1,892	6.57	−2.56
Others	N/A	1,913		
Turnout		28,794	46.11	−6.10
2nd round result
LREM	Albane Gaillot	12,511	53.61	N/A
LFI	Djamel Arrouche	10,824	46.39	N/A
Turnout		23,335	37.37	+9.18
LREM gain from PS		Swing		

=== 2012 ===
Legislative Election 2012: Val-de-Marne's 11th constituency
Party	Candidate	Votes	%	±%
PS	Jean-Yves Le Bouillonnec	12,878	41.17	+11.51
PG (FG)	Gilles Delbos*	5,942	19.00	+2.13
UMP	Christelle Prache	5,278	16.87	−10.01
FN	Thérèse Patry	2,856	9.13	+5.49
EELV	Christian Metairie	1,642	5.25	+0.22
MoDem	Jorge Carvalho	885	2.83	−6.55
Others	N/A	1,799		
Turnout		31,280	52.21	−5.58
2nd round result
PS	Jean-Yves Le Bouillonnec	16,885	100.00	+37.21
Turnout		16,885	28.19	−26.24
PS hold				

* Withdrew before the 2nd round

=== 2007 ===
Legislative Election 2007: Val-de-Marne's 11th constituency
Party	Candidate	Votes	%	±%
PS	Jean-Yves Le Bouillonnec	9,729	29.66	+5.93
UMP	Sophie Pinon	8,817	26.88	+0.20
PCF	Claudine Cordillot	5,533	16.87	−5.84
MoDem	Isabelle Trehou	3,076	9.38	N/A
LV	Alain Lipietz	1,651	5.03	−1.10
FN	Marie-Thérèse Le Guilloux	1,193	3.64	−6.73
Far left	Anne Leydier	854	2.60	N/A
Others	N/A	1,952		
Turnout		33,327	57.79	−4.24
2nd round result
PS	Jean-Yves Le Bouillonnec	19,126	62.79	+6.59
UMP	Sophie Pinon	11,332	37.21	−6.59
Turnout		31,393	54.43	−1.44
PS hold				

=== 2002 ===
Legislative Election 2002: Val-de-Marne's 11th constituency
Party	Candidate	Votes	%	±%
UMP	Carine N'guyen	8,488	26.68	+5.96
PS	Jean-Yves Le Bouillonnec	7,547	23.73	N/A
PCF	Claude Billard	7,224	22.71	−7.70
FN	Jocelyne Bureau	3,299	10.37	N/A
LV	Alain Lipietz	1,949	6.13	−14.38
PR	Fatiha Mlati	772	2.43	N/A
Others	N/A	2,530		
Turnout		32,268	62.03	−2.21
2nd round result
PS	Jean-Yves Le Bouillonnec	15,568	56.20	N/A
UMP	Carine N'guyen	12,132	43.80	+8.12
Turnout		29,065	55.87	−9.87
PS gain from PCF				

=== 1997 ===
Legislative Election 1997: Val-de-Marne's 11th constituency
Party	Candidate	Votes	%	±%
PCF	Claude Billard	9,900	30.41	
RPR	Daniel Richard	6,745	20.72	
LV	Alain Lipietz	6,675	20.51	
MRC	Thierry Bonhoure	1,074	3.30	
LO	Denis Guillard	977	3.00	
GE	Carole Teyssedre	747	2.29	
Others	N/A	2,284		
Turnout		33,451	64.24	
2nd round result
PCF	Claude Billard	20,912	64.32	
RPR	Daniel Richard	11,598	35.68	
Turnout		34,234	65.74	
PCF hold				

== Sources ==
Official results of French elections from 2002: "Résultats électoraux officiels en France" (in French).
