= Sophie Taillé-Polian =

French politician

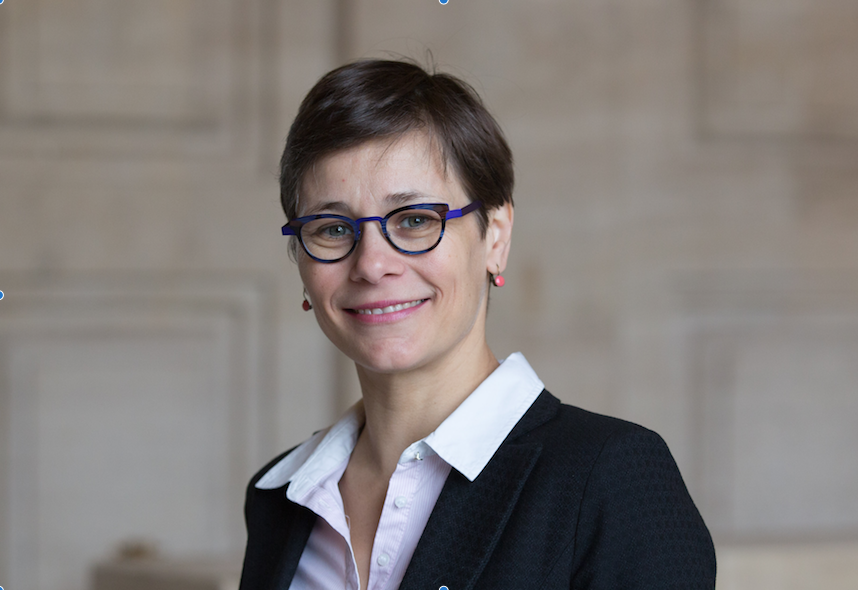
- Sophie Taillé-Polian in 2018

Member of the National Assembly for Val-de-Marne's 11th constituency
- Incumbent
- Assumed office 22 June 2022
- Preceded by: Albane Gaillot

Personal details
- Born: Sophie Taillé; 4 October 1974 (age 52) Ermont, Val-d'Oise, France
- Party: Génération.s (since 2018)
- Other political affiliations: Socialist (1995–2018)
- Education: Paris Nanterre University

Sophie Taillé-Polian (French pronunciation: [sɔfi taje pɔljɑ̃]; née Taillé; born 4 October 1974) is a French politician who has represented Val-de-Marne's 11th constituency in the National Assembly since 2022. She previously served as a Senator for Val-de-Marne from 2017 to 2022.

== See also ==
- List of deputies of the 16th National Assembly of France
