= Nicolas Démoulin =

French politician

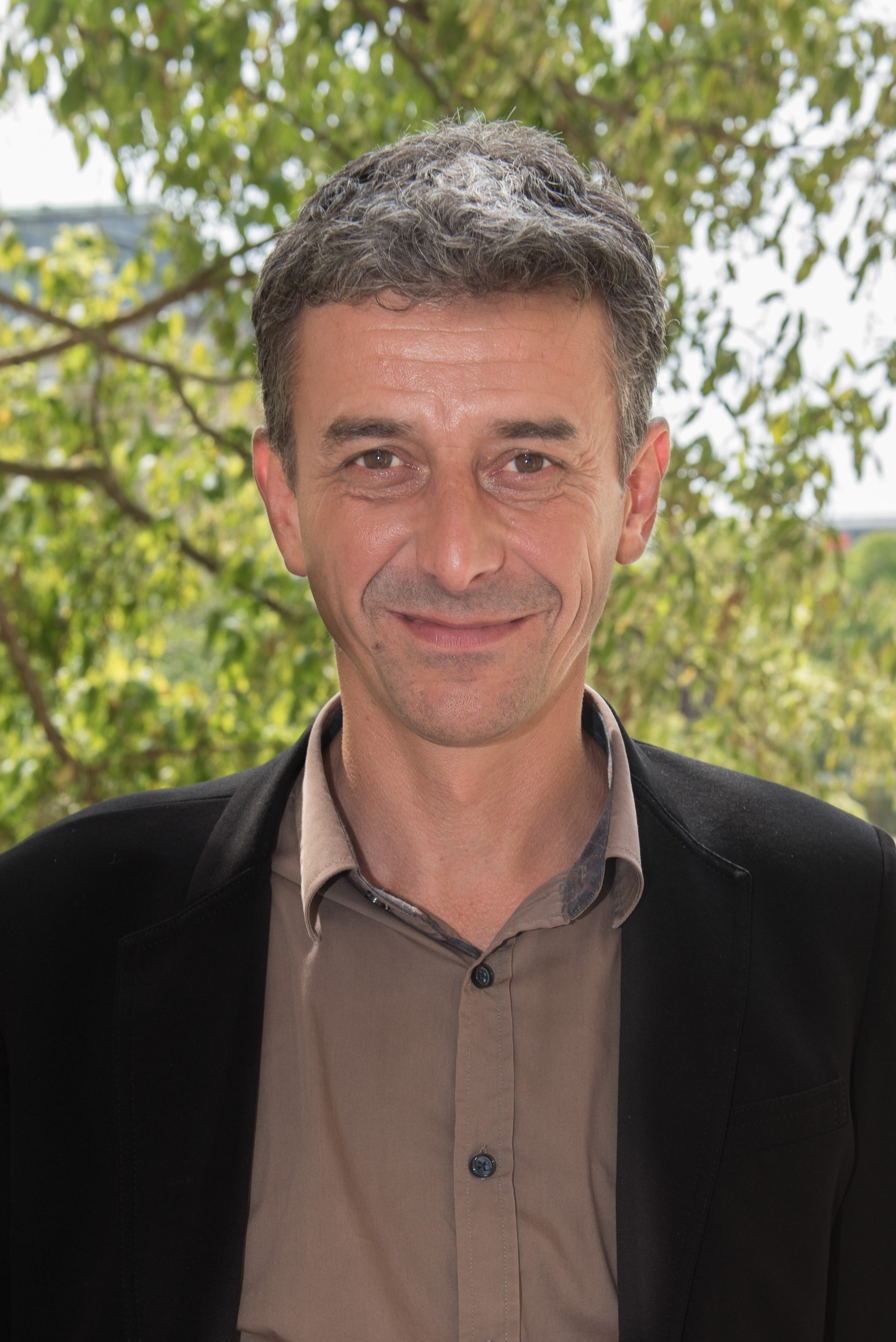

Member of the National Assembly for Hérault's 8th constituency
- In office 21 June 2017 – 21 June 2022
- Preceded by: Christian Assaf
- Succeeded by: Sylvain Carrière

Personal details
- Born: 22 July 1972 (age 53); Bordeaux, France
- Political party: La République En Marche!
- Education: Lycée Joffre
- Alma mater: University of Montpellier

Nicolas Démoulin (born 22 July 1972 in Bordeaux) is a French politician of La République En Marche! (LREM) who has been serving as a member of the French National Assembly since the 2017 elections, representing the department of Hérault.

== Political career ==
In parliament, Démoulin serves on the Committee on Economic Affairs. In addition to his committee assignments, he is a member of the French-Malian Parliamentary Friendship Group.

Since October 2018, Démoulin has been serving as one of five deputy chairpersons of the LREM parliamentary group, under the leadership of chairman Gilles Le Gendre.

He did not seek re-election in the 2022 French legislative election.

== Political positions ==
In July 2019, Démoulin voted in favor of the French ratification of the European Union’s Comprehensive Economic and Trade Agreement (CETA) with Canada.
