= Causeur (magazine) =

French news magazine

Causeur (French pronunciation: [kozœʁ]) is a French news magazine. It was created on November 15, 2007, by journalist Élisabeth Lévy and historian Gil Mihaely, as well as philosophers Alain Finkielkraut, Paul Thibaud and Peter Sloterdijk. The magazine claims to be "pluralist, anti-conformist and sometimes reactionary". It claims to combat "political correctness" concerning subjects such as immigration and islam and is often classed to the right or the far right of the political spectrum. It is financed by several French businessmen and millionaires, among whom is Gérald Penciolelli, a former member of the Ordre Nouveau.

A monthly print version has been published since June 2008, and distributed to newsagents since April 4, 2013.

== History ==
The Causeur website was created on November 15, 2007, by journalist Élisabeth Lévy, historian Gil Mihaely, and philosophers Alain Finkielkraut, Paul Thibaud and Peter Sloterdijk. It also hosts several blogs.

A monthly print version has been published since June 2008, and distributed to newsagents since April 4, 2013. In 2013, 44% of Causeur's financing came from Gérald Penciolelli, described as a "French far-right figure" because he was part of the leadership team of Ordre Nouveau and the Party of New Forces.

During the campaign leading up to the 2012 French presidential elections, a weekly "battle" pitted a Causeur journalist against a representative of Rue89, in partnership with Yahoo.
