= Hérault's 8th constituency =

Constituency of the National Assembly of France

8th constituency of Hérault
- inline Constituency of the National Assembly of France

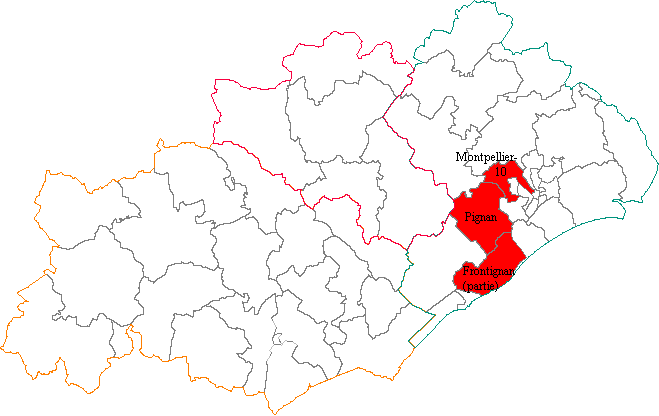
- Constituency in department

- Location of Hérault in France
- Deputy: Sylvain Carrière; LFI
- Department: Hérault
- Cantons: (pre-2015) Frontignan, Montpellier-10, Pignan
- Registered voters: 124,880

The 8th constituency of Hérault is a French legislative constituency in the Hérault département. The 8th and 9th constituencies were created on 21 January 2010, as part of the 2010 redistricting of French legislative constituencies.

== Deputies ==
Election	Member	Party
2012	Christian Assaf	PS
2017	Nicolas Démoulin	LREM
2022	Sylvain Carrière	LFI
2024	Sylvain Carrière	LFI

== Election results ==
=== 2024 ===
Candidate	Party	Alliance	First round			Second round		
Candidate	Party	Alliance	Votes	%	+/–	Votes	%	+/–
Cédric Delapierre	RN		25,831	40.12	+15.20	29,446	49.67	+0.26
Sylvain Carriere	LFI	NFP	21,061	32.71	+3.36	29,841	50.33	-0.26
Isabelle Autier	HOR	Ensemble	10,854	16.86	-7.42			
Bérangère Dubus	DVD		4,083	6.34	new			
Sabria Boullaga	ECO		2,019	3.14	new			
Thomas Garnier	LO		533	0.83	+0.29			
Votes			64,381	100.00		59,287	100.00	
Valid votes			64,381	97.45	-0.52	59,287	91.14	+3.10
Blank votes			1,112	1.68	+0.22	4,314	6.63	-2.31
Null votes			571	0.86	+0.29	1,452	2.23	-0.79
Turnout			66,064	69.07	+22.51	65,053	68.00	+21.65
Abstentions			29,580	30.93	-22.51	30,608	32.00	-21.65
Registered voters			95,644			95,661		
Result			LFI HOLD					

=== 2022 ===
Legislative Election 2022: Hérault's 8th constituency
Party	Candidate	Votes	%	±%
LFI (NUPÉS)	Sylvain Carrière	12,634	29.35	-2.29
RN	Cédric Delapierre	10,729	24.92	+3.79
HOR (Ensemble)	Jean-François Audrin	10,453	24.28	−6.98
REC	Franck Sylvestre	2,231	5.18	N/A
FGR	Olivier Andrieu	1,918	4.46	N/A
LR (UDC)	Nathalie Fefeuvre-Roumanos	1,570	3.65	−6.13
DVE	Jean-Baptiste Roger	1,116	2.59	N/A
Others	N/A	2,400		
Turnout		43,051	46.56	−1.28
2nd round result
LFI (NUPÉS)	Sylvain Carrière	19,483	50.59	N/A
RN	Cédric Delapierre	19,025	49.41	+12.26
Turnout		38,508	46.35	+6.16
LFI gain from LREM				

=== 2017 ===
Candidate	Label	First round		Second round	
Candidate	Label	Votes	%	Votes	%
Nicolas Démoulin	REM	12,954	31.26	19,757	62.85
Gérard Prato	FN	8,758	21.13	11,680	37.15
Marielle Fenech-Monfort	FI	7,166	17.29		
Christian Assaf	PS	4,235	10.22		
Arnaud Julien	LR	4,051	9.78		
Sabria Bouallaga	ECO	879	2.12		
Max Savy	PCF	835	2.01		
Charles Khoury	DVG	634	1.53		
Michel Colas	DLF	543	1.31		
Laura Andreoletti	DIV	523	1.26		
Romain Mespoulet	DIV	313	0.76		
Carlos Ribeiro	EXG	300	0.72		
Thierry Teulade	DVG	187	0.45		
Philippe Maillet	DVD	64	0.15		
Votes		41,442	100.00	31,437	100.00
Valid votes		41,442	97.84	31,437	88.34
Blank votes		631	1.49	3,081	8.66
Null votes		283	0.67	1,068	3.00
Turnout		42,356	47.84	35,586	40.19
Abstentions		46,185	52.16	52,962	59.81
Registered voters		88,541		88,548	
Source: Ministry of the Interior

=== 2012 ===
2012 legislative election in Herault's 8th constituency
Candidate	Party	First round		Second round	
Candidate	Party	Votes	%	Votes	%
Christian Assaf	PS	16,882	36.08%	24,161	55.24%
Arnaud Julien	UMP	12,381	26.46%	19,579	44.76%
Alexandra Poucet	FN	9,704	20.74%		
Michel Passet	FG	3,633	7.76%		
François Baraize	EELV	1,972	4.21%		
Philippe Thines	PRG	616	1.32%		
Dominique Siccardi	AEI	458	0.98%		
Anne Arnaudon	DLR	287	0.61%		
Sophie Bietrix		250	0.53%		
Fabrice Tavera	PP	234	0.50%		
Didier Michel	LO	172	0.37%		
Philippe Rosengarten		115	0.25%		
Sylvain Perea	SP	85	0.18%		
Valid votes		46,789	98.34%	43,740	95.64%
Spoilt and null votes		790	1.66%	1,992	4.36%
Votes cast / turnout		47,579	58.96%	45,732	56.68%
Abstentions		33,112	41.04%	34,959	43.32%
Registered voters		80,691	100.00%	80,691	100.00%
