= 1988 French legislative election =

- 5 and 12 June 1988

All 577 seats to the French National Assembly 289 seats were needed for a majority
- Turnout: 65.7% (1st round); 69.9% (▲4.2 pp) (2nd round)
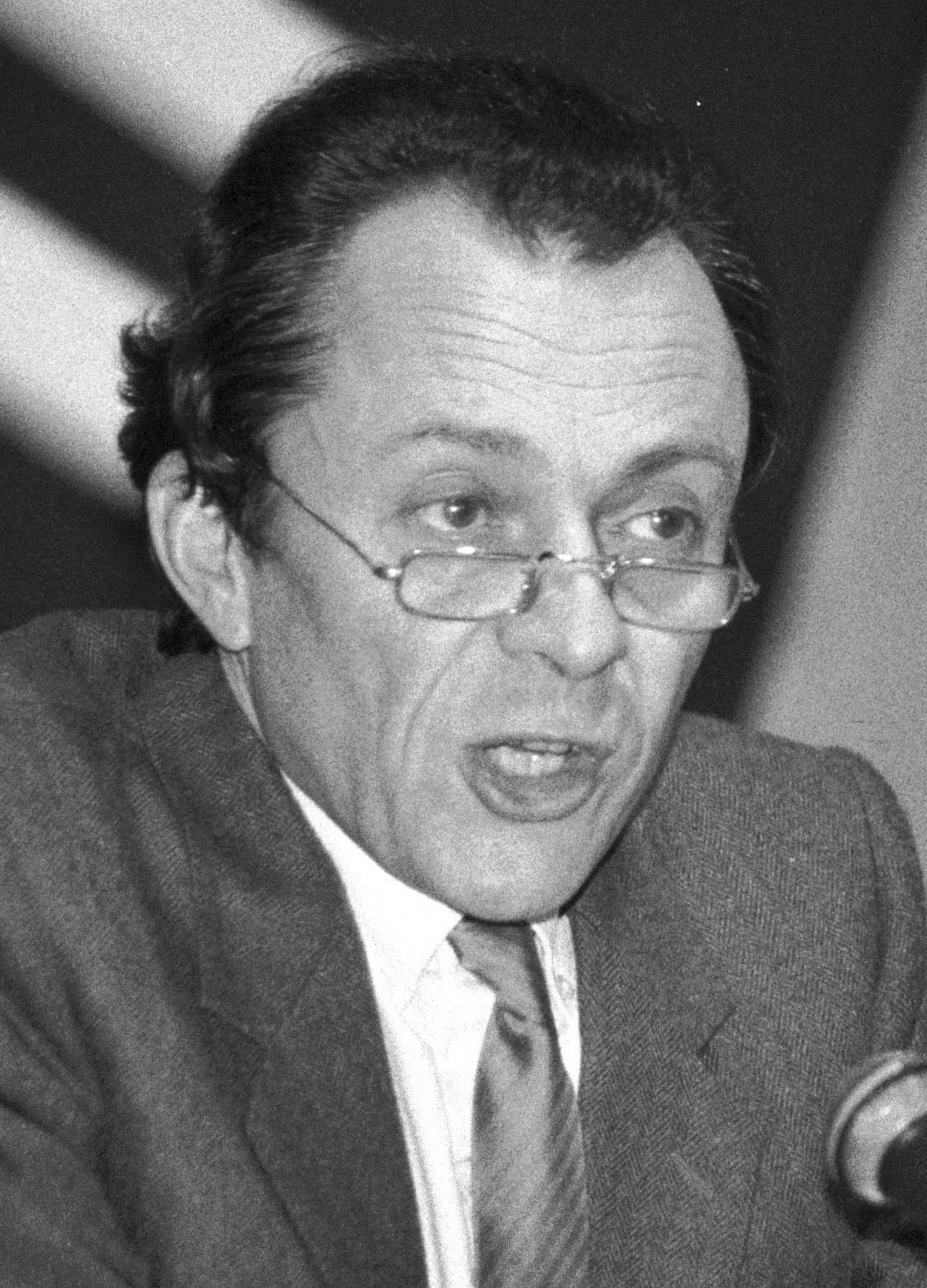

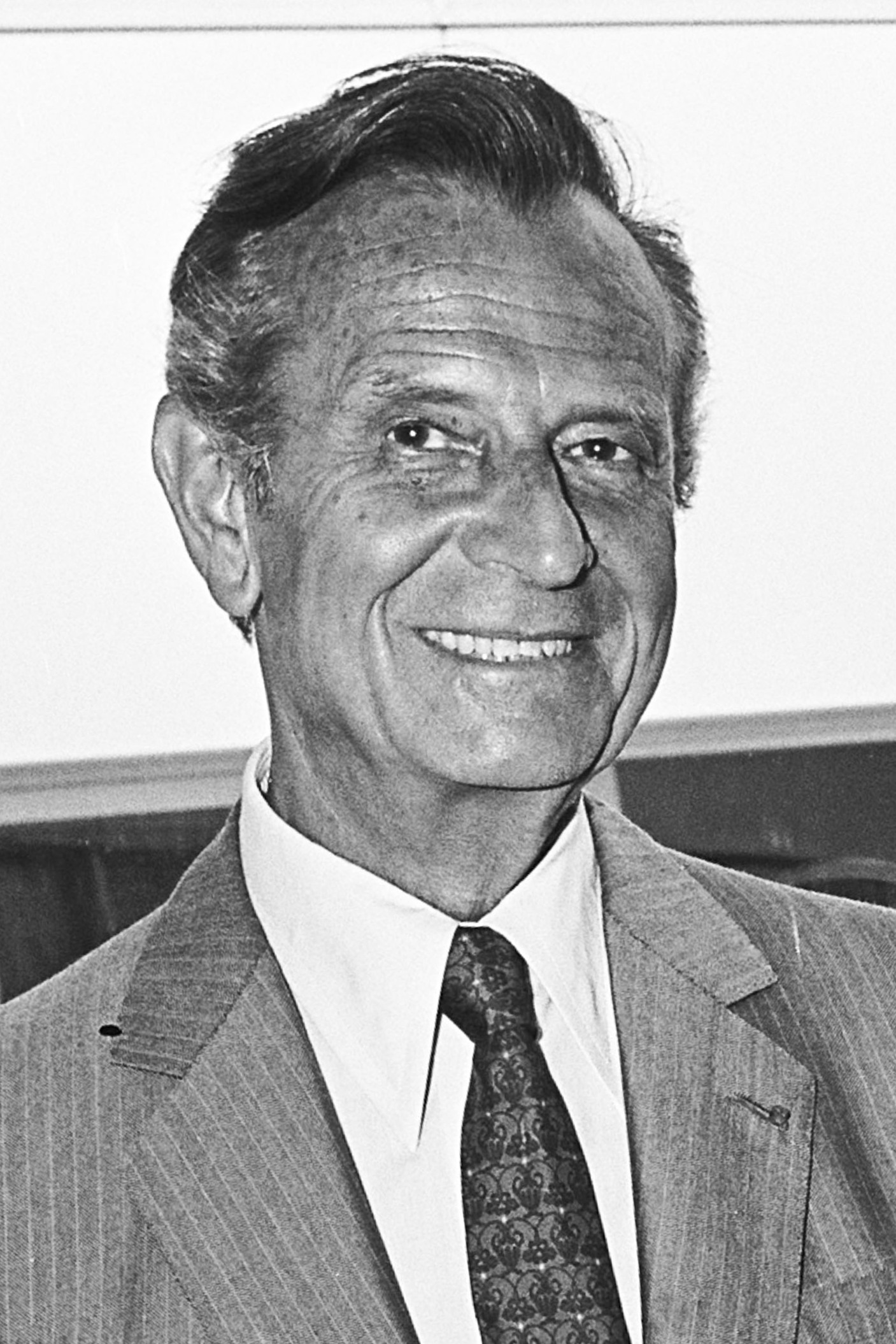

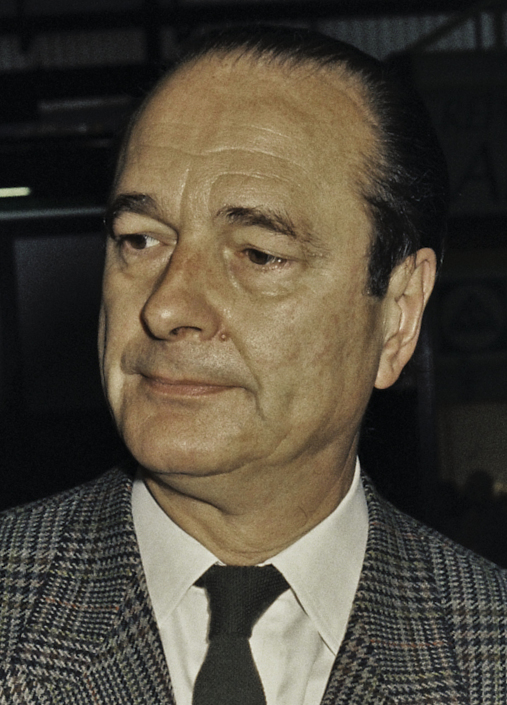

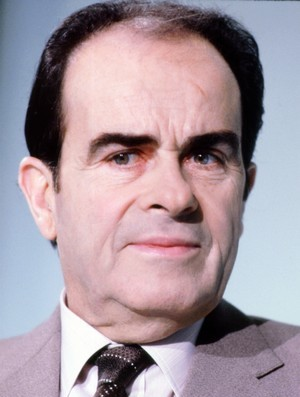

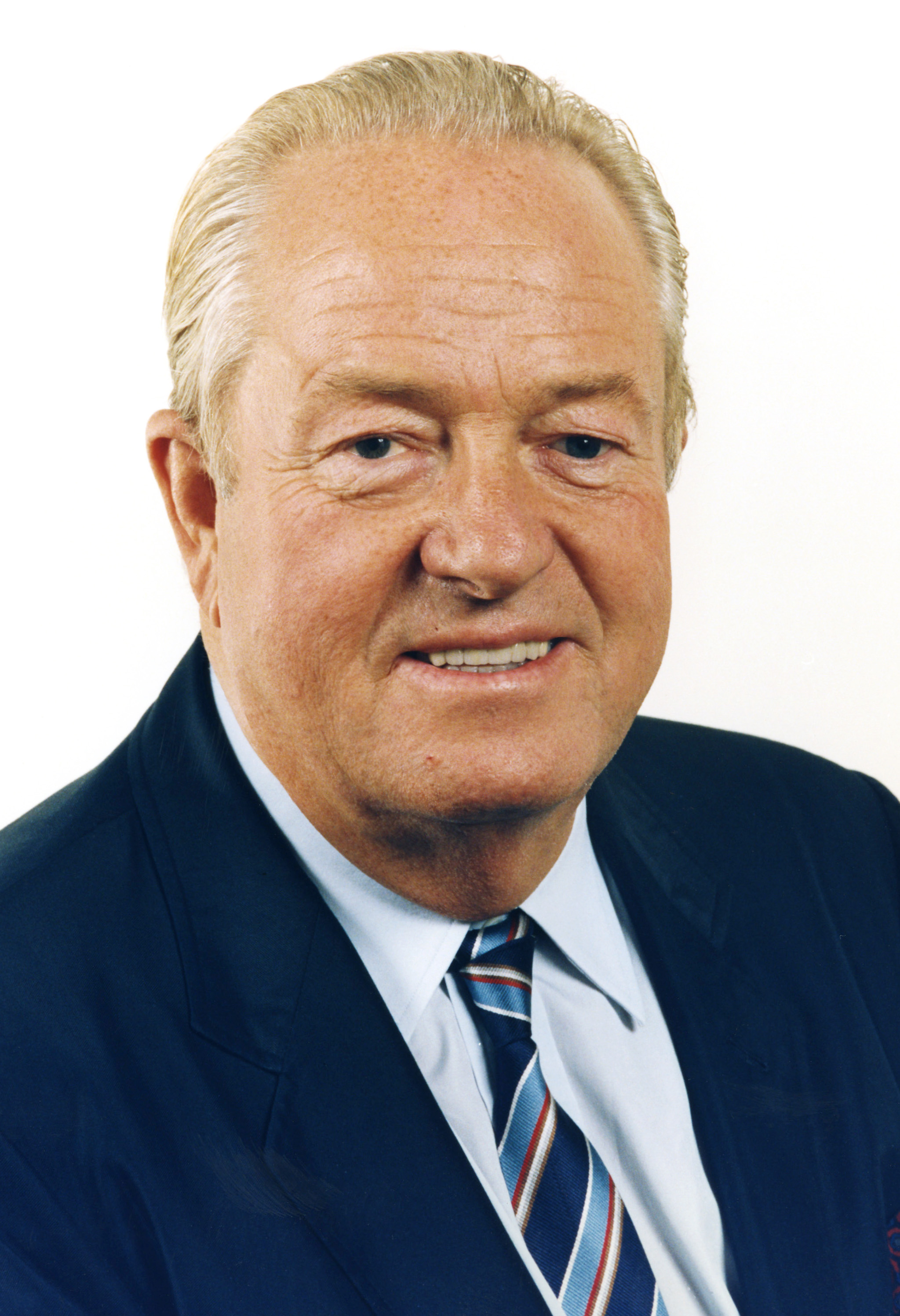
	Majority party	Minority party	Third party
Leader	Michel Rocard	Jean Lecanuet	Jacques Chirac
Party	PS	UDF	RPR
Leader's seat	Yvelines-7th	Seine-Maritime (Senator)	Corrèze-3rd
Last election	206 seats, 31.0%	127 seats (UOR)	149 seats (UOR)
Seats won	262	130	128
Seat change	▲56	▲3	▼21
Popular vote	8,493,702 (1st round); 9,198,778 (2nd round)	4,519,459 (1st round); 4,299,370 (2nd round)	4,687,047 (1st round); 4,688,493 (2nd round)
Percentage	34.77% (1st round); 45.31% (2nd round)	18.50% (1st round); 21.18% (2nd round)	19.19% (1st round); 23.09% (2nd round)
	Fourth party	Fifth party
Leader	Georges Marchais	Jean-Marie Le Pen
Party	PCF	FN
Leader's seat	Val-de-Marne's 11th constituency	lost, list seat in Paris
Last election	35 seats, 9.8%	35 seats, 9.7%
Seats won	27	1
Seat change	▼8	▼34
Popular vote	2,765,761 (1st round); 695,569 (2nd round)	2,359,528 (1st round); 216,704 (2nd round)
Percentage	11.32% (1st round); 3.43% (2nd round)	9.66% (1st round); 1.07% (2nd round)
- Map showing the results of the second round.
Prime Minister before election
Jacques Chirac
RPR
Elected Prime Minister
Michel Rocard
PS

Legislative elections were held in France on 5 and 12 June 1988, to elect the ninth National Assembly of the Fifth Republic, one month after the re-election of François Mitterrand as President of France.

In 1986, the Socialist Party (PS) of President Mitterrand lost the legislative election. For the first time under the Fifth Republic, the President was forced to "cohabit" with a hostile parliamentary majority and cabinet. He chose the RPR leader Jacques Chirac as prime minister. The two heads of the executive power were rivals for the 1988 presidential election.

Inspired by the example of Ronald Reagan and Margaret Thatcher, Chirac campaigned on an aggressively right-wing set of policies (including privatisations, abolition of the solidarity tax on wealth and tightening restrictions on immigration) but he was faced with significant opposition in French society. For his part, Mitterrand presented himself as the protector of national unity. He campaigned for a "united France" and warned against "the appropriation of the state by a clan", targeting Chirac and the RPR. An alliance between the Socialists and the center-right UDF was evoked.

After Mitterrand's re-election, Chirac resigned. Some politicians and commentators suggested not dissolving the National Assembly and instead nominating a UDF Prime minister (Valéry Giscard d'Estaing or Simone Veil). President Mitterrand refused. The polls indicated a "pink surge" if new legislative elections were organized. However, he nominated the moderate Socialist Michel Rocard to lead the cabinet and declared that it was unhealthy for democracy if one party held all the power.

Despite a very good result in the first round, the "Presidential Majority" (composed of the PS and the Left Radicals) obtained only a small parliamentary majority after the second round. The PS and its allies won 276 seats against 271 for the Republican right-wing coalition and 27 Communists. The re-establishment of the majoritarian two-ballot system resulted in the National Front, which had held 35 seats during the previous term, dropping to only one seat.

Some personalities from "civil society" and four UDF politicians participated in the government. They were supported by a minority of their party, which created a new parliamentary group: the Union of the Centre. The executive power relied on the "Presidential Majority" which widened towards the Union of the Centre or the French Communist Party depending on the policy being advocated by the government.

== Results ==
Party	First round			Second round			Total seats
Party	Votes	%	Seats	Votes	%	Seats	Total seats
Socialist Party	8,493,702	34.76	37	9,198,778	45.31	225	262
Rally for the Republic	4,687,047	19.18	38	4,688,493	23.09	90	128
Union for French Democracy	4,519,459	18.50	38	4,299,370	21.18	92	130
French Communist Party	2,765,761	11.32	1	695,569	3.43	26	27
National Front	2,359,528	9.66	0	216,704	1.07	1	1
Miscellaneous right	697,272	2.85	3	522,970	2.58	9	12
Miscellaneous left	403,690	1.65	1	421,587	2.08	5	6
Movement of Left Radicals	279,316	1.14	2	260,104	1.28	7	9
Far-left	89,065	0.36	0				0
Ecologists	86,312	0.35	0				0
Far-right	32,445	0.13	0				0
Regionalists	18,498	0.08	0				0
French Polynesian seats							2
Total	24,432,095	100.00	120	20,303,575	100.00	455	577
Valid votes	24,432,095	97.94		20,303,575	96.69		
Invalid/blank votes	512,697	2.06		695,106	3.31		
Total votes	24,944,792	100.00		20,998,681	100.00		
Registered voters/turnout	37,945,582	65.74		30,045,772	69.89		
Source: IPU

=== Parliamentary groups in the National Assembly ===
A Communist group (24 members + 1 caucusing) was created on 15 July 1988 following the lowering of the threshold to form a group from 30 to 20.

Party	Seats
Socialist Group	275
RPR Group	130
UDF Group	90
Union du Centre Group	40
Communist Group	25
Non-Inscrits	17
Total	577
Source: IPU
