= 2024 French legislative election in Essonne =

Following the first round of the 2024 French legislative election on 30 June 2024, runoff elections in each constituency where no candidate received a vote share greater than 50 percent were scheduled for 7 July. Candidates permitted to stand in the runoff elections needed to either come in first or second place in the first round or achieve more than 12.5 percent of the votes of the entire electorate (as opposed to 12.5 percent of the vote share due to low turnout).

== Essonne ==
=== 1st constituency ===
Candidate	Party or alliance		First round		Second round	
Candidate	Party or alliance		Votes	%	Votes	%
Farida Amrani	New Popular Front	La France Insoumise	19,109	46.07	21,311	50.97
Stéphane Beaudet	Independent		11,506	27.74	11,256	26.92
Thiébauld Vega	National Rally		9,264	22.34	9,244	22.11
Jean Camonin	Far-left	Lutte Ouvrière	565	1.36		
Hélène Bérenger	Reconquête		539	1.30		
Baptiste Galand	Ecologists	Independent	405	0.98		
Gladys Eyang	Independent		87	0.21		
Total			41,475	100.00	41,811	100.00
Valid votes			41,475	97.52	41,811	98.07
Invalid votes			350	0.82	235	0.55
Blank votes			703	1.65	588	1.38
Total votes			42,528	100.00	42,634	100.00
Registered voters/turnout			69,794	60.93	69,850	61.04

=== 2nd constituency ===
Candidate	Party or alliance		First round		Second round	
Candidate	Party or alliance		Votes	%	Votes	%
Nathalie Da Conceicao Carvalho	National Rally		24,608	40.30	28,898	52.46
Mathieu Hillaire	New Popular Front	La France Insoumise	16,207	26.54	26,193	47.54
Naïma Sifer	Ensemble	Horizons	13,490	22.09		
Pierre Mayeur	Miscellaneous right	Independent	2,054	3.36		
Alexandre Lienhard	Ecologists	Independent	1,754	2.87		
Jacques Borie	Ecologists	Independent	1,389	2.27		
Carla Tarcy	Reconquête		1,045	1.71		
Mathilde Phan Hieu	Far-left	Lutte Ouvrière	517	0.85		
Total			61,064	100.00	55,091	100.00
Valid votes			61,064	97.18	55,091	89.49
Invalid votes			493	0.78	1,356	2.20
Blank votes			1,276	2.03	5,115	8.31
Total votes			62,833	100.00	61,562	100.00
Registered voters/turnout			92,918	67.62	92,964	66.22

=== 3rd constituency ===
Candidate	Party or alliance		First round		Second round	
Candidate	Party or alliance		Votes	%	Votes	%
Stefan Milosevic	National Rally		22,290	33.01	26,996	43.29
Steevy Gustave	New Popular Front	The Ecologists	20,874	30.91	35,365	56.71
Alexis Izard	Ensemble	Renaissance	20,189	29.90		
Catherine Bompard	Independent		2,453	3.63		
Denis Tranier	Reconquête		925	1.37		
Joëlle Lopes-Venot	Far-left	Lutte Ouvrière	713	1.06		
Salvador Ribiero	Independent		82	0.12		
Total			67,526	100.00	62,361	100.00
Valid votes			67,526	97.48	62,361	90.96
Invalid votes			451	0.65	1,211	1.77
Blank votes			1,293	1.87	4,989	7.28
Total votes			69,270	100.00	68,561	100.00
Registered voters/turnout			99,134	69.88	99,150	69.15

=== 4th constituency ===
Candidate	Party or alliance		First round		Second round	
Candidate	Party or alliance		Votes	%	Votes	%
Marie-Pierre Rixain	Ensemble	Renaissance	23,108	33.91	42,392	64.56
Jérôme Carbriand	Union of the far right	The Republicans	21,144	31.03	23,266	35.44
Amadou Deme	New Popular Front	Communist Party	21,010	30.83		
Tony Gomes	Reconquête		1,177	1.73		
Michèle Pohyer	Far-left	Lutte Ouvrière	790	1.16		
Jean-François Ricois	Independent		500	0.73		
Yves Marty	Independent		419	0.61		
Total			68,148	100.00	65,658	100.00
Valid votes			68,148	96.94	65,658	95.08
Invalid votes			493	0.70	673	0.97
Blank votes			1,656	2.36	2,728	3.95
Total votes			70,297	100.00	69,059	100.00
Registered voters/turnout			99,613	70.57	99,632	69.31

=== 5th constituency ===
Candidate	Party or alliance		First round		Second round	
Candidate	Party or alliance		Votes	%	Votes	%
Pierre Larrouturou	New Popular Front	Miscellaneous left	19,107	37.93	21,683	48.26
Paul Midy	Ensemble	Renaissance	16,362	32.48	23,248	51.74
Laetitia Horvelin	National Rally		7,692	15.27		
François Guy Trébulle	Miscellaneous right	Independent	4,998	9.92		
Marianne Billoir	Ecologists	Independent	898	1.78		
Wendy Lonchampt	Reconquête		627	1.24		
Benoît Odille	Miscellaneous left	Independent	380	0.75		
Didier Paxion	Far-left	Lutte Ouvrière	317	0.63		
Total			50,381	100.00	44,931	100.00
Valid votes			50,381	98.58	44,931	93.31
Invalid votes			227	0.44	814	1.69
Blank votes			501	0.98	2,407	5.00
Total votes			51,109	100.00	48,152	100.00
Registered voters/turnout			68,706	74.39	68,718	70.07

=== 6th constituency ===
Candidate	Party or alliance		First round		Second round	
Candidate	Party or alliance		Votes	%	Votes	%
Hella Kribi-Romdhane	New Popular Front	Génération.s	19,280	34.44	38,991	74.26
Jérôme Guedj	Miscellaneous left	Socialist Party	14,124	25.23		
Natacha Goupy	National Rally		11,650	20.81	13,515	25.74
Chantal Lacarrière Farges	The Republicans		8,119	14.50		
Aloïs Lang-Rousseau	Ecologists	Independent	1,455	2.60		
Francine Monnier	Reconquête		1,075	1.92		
Bastien Vayssière	Far-left	Lutte Ouvrière	280	0.50		
Total			55,983	100.00	52,506	100.00
Valid votes			55,983	98.16	52,506	95.04
Invalid votes			231	0.41	544	0.98
Blank votes			817	1.43	2,194	3.97
Total votes			57,031	100.00	55,244	100.00
Registered voters/turnout			83,324	68.44	83,346	66.28

=== 7th constituency ===
Candidate	Party or alliance		First round		Second round	
Candidate	Party or alliance		Votes	%	Votes	%
Claire Lejeune	New Popular Front	La France Insoumise	19,012	40.83	20,780	44.31
Robin Reda	Ensemble	Renaissance	14,000	30.07	15,581	33.23
Audrey Guibert	National Rally		11,676	25.07	10,532	22.46
Olivier Vagneux	Miscellaneous right	Independent	694	1.49		
Olivier Villette	Independent		606	1.30		
Didier Cormier	Reconquête		577	1.24		
Total			46,565	100.00	46,893	100.00
Valid votes			46,565	97.76	46,893	98.18
Invalid votes			307	0.64	230	0.48
Blank votes			760	1.60	640	1.34
Total votes			47,632	100.00	47,763	100.00
Registered voters/turnout			74,148	64.24	74,187	64.38

=== 8th constituency ===
Candidate	Party or alliance		First round		Second round	
Candidate	Party or alliance		Votes	%	Votes	%
Bérenger Cernon	New Popular Front	La France Insoumise	16,986	34.37	20,185	40.52
Nicolas Dupont-Aignan	Sovereigntist right	Debout la France	16,288	32.96	18,672	37.48
François Durovray	Miscellaneous right	The Republicans	13,532	27.38	10,960	22.00
Amina Bouatlaoui	Ecologists	Independent	1,683	3.41		
Chantal Duboulay	Far-left	Lutte Ouvrière	432	0.87		
Lolita Duquenoy	Independent		283	0.57		
Jean-Baptiste Taofifenua	Miscellaneous centre	Independent	218	0.44		
Total			49,422	100.00	49,817	100.00
Valid votes			49,422	97.75	49,817	98.14
Invalid votes			318	0.63	205	0.40
Blank votes			818	1.62	737	1.45
Total votes			50,558	100.00	50,759	100.00
Registered voters/turnout			76,565	66.03	76,578	66.28

=== 9th constituency ===
Candidate	Party or alliance		First round		Second round	
Candidate	Party or alliance		Votes	%	Votes	%
Julie Ozenne	New Popular Front	The Ecologists	19,288	37.60	29,461	62.00
Paul-Henri Merrien	National Rally		15,449	30.12	18,057	38.00
Marie Guévenoux	Ensemble	Renaissance	13,908	27.11		
Bruno Chamberlin	Independent		1,652	3.22		
Benoît Grisaud	Far-left	Lutte Ouvrière	831	1.62		
Sinan Boran	Independent		168	0.33		
Total			51,296	100.00	47,518	100.00
Valid votes			51,296	97.39	47,518	91.58
Invalid votes			319	0.61	869	1.67
Blank votes			1,057	2.01	3,498	6.74
Total votes			52,672	100.00	51,885	100.00
Registered voters/turnout			79,787	66.02	79,812	65.01

=== 10th constituency ===
Candidate	Party or alliance		First round		Second round	
Candidate	Party or alliance		Votes	%	Votes	%
Antoine Léaument	New Popular Front	La France Insoumise	16,242	43.01	22,556	65.16
Michael Amand	National Rally		9,784	25.91	12,061	34.84
Alexandra Monet	Ensemble	Horizons	7,137	18.90		
Nicolas de Boishue	The Republicans		2,207	5.84		
Thierry Deneuve	Ecologists	Independent	694	1.84		
Kamel Kecer	Ecologists	Independent	622	1.65		
Stéphanie Hamon	Reconquête		373	0.99		
Monique Leclerc	Far-left	Lutte Ouvrière	317	0.84		
Willy Deckel	Independent		257	0.68		
Joël Mando	Miscellaneous right	Independent	70	0.19		
Mihala Kabama	Independent		60	0.16		
Total			37,763	100.00	34,617	100.00
Valid votes			37,763	97.57	34,617	90.93
Invalid votes			344	0.89	703	1.85
Blank votes			596	1.54	2,749	7.22
Total votes			38,703	100.00	38,069	100.00
Registered voters/turnout			62,824	61.61	62,852	60.57
