= Bernard Bouley =

French politician (born 1950)

Member of the National Assembly for Essonne's 2nd constituency
- In office 5 August 2020 – 21 June 2022
- Preceded by: Franck Marlin
- Succeeded by: Nathalie Da Conceicao Carvalho

Personal details
- Born: 11 July 1950 (age 76) Paris, France
- Party: Republican

Bernard Bouley (born 11 July 1950) is a French politician who became Member of Parliament for Essonne's 2nd constituency in 2020, when he replaced Franck Marlin. He stood down at the 2022 French legislative election.

== Biography ==
Originally from Paris, Bernard Bouley moved to Mennecy in Essonne in 1978. He presented himself as a business executive.

He served as the president of the Association for Occupational Health in Essonne (ASTE).

While serving as deputy mayor in Mennecy, he ran as a candidate in a partial legislative election in 1995 in the Essonne's 2nd constituency, as the substitute for Franck Marlin, a dissident from the Rally for the Republic (RPR) and mayor of Étampes. They were elected and re-elected from 1997 to 2017 under various labels of RPR, Union for a Popular Movement, and Republicans.

In January 2013, he ran in the partial municipal election of Morigny-Champigny on the list of the incumbent mayor, Catherine Carrère, and was elected municipal councillor.

In the 2020 municipal elections, Bernard Bouley was elected municipal councillor of Milly-la-Forêt, while Franck Marlin was re-elected mayor of Étampes. However, new legislation on the accumulation of mandates prohibited him from holding both positions simultaneously. He then resigned from the National Assembly, being succeeded by Bernard Bouley.

He did not run for a second term in the 2022 legislative elections.

Bernard Bouley joined The Republicans group.
