= Geneviève Colot =

French politician

Geneviève Colot (born 22 June 1950 in Gommegnies) is a former member of the National Assembly of France. She represented the Essonne department, and is a member of the Union for a Popular Movement.

== Political career ==
Geneviève Colot was elected municipal councillor and deputy mayor during the 1983 municipal elections, and then she was elected mayor of Saint-Cyr-sous-Dourdan in the 1989 elections. During the 1993 legislative elections, she served as the substitute for Jean de Boishue, who won the Essonne's 3rd constituency with 54.34% of the votes. Re-elected during the 1995 municipal elections, she also became a deputy on the same day due to Jean de Boishue's appointment in the first government of Alain Juppé. In the 1997 legislative elections, the incumbent deputy lost the district with 47.42% of the votes. In the 1998 regional elections, Geneviève Colot was elected regional councillor on the list of the Union for French Democracy, which won 26.04% of the votes. During the 2001 municipal elections, she was re-elected as the mayor of Saint-Cyr-sous-Dourdan, and she won the 2002 legislative elections with 54.03% of the votes against the incumbent socialist deputy. In 2004, she resigned from her position in the Regional Council of Île-de-France and was re-elected as a deputy in the 2007 legislative elections with 54.58% of the votes, also winning the 2008 municipal elections. In the 2012 legislative election, she was defeated in the second round by her socialist opponent, receiving 47.02% of the votes.
