= Essonne's 3rd constituency =

Constituency of the National Assembly of France

3rd constituency of Essonne
- inline Constituency of the National Assembly of France

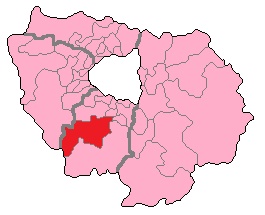
- Essonne's 3rd Constituency shown within Île-de-France
- Deputy: Steevy Gustave; LE
- Department: Essonne
- Cantons: Dourdan, Étréchy, Saint-Chéron, Arpajon (part), Brétigny-sur-Orge
- Registered voters: 95,817

The 3rd constituency of Essonne is a French legislative constituency in the Essonne département.

== Description ==
The 3rd constituency of Essonne covers a large swath of the centre of the department, reaching towards the edge of the suburbs of Paris. The seat today covers none of the territory of its predecessor between 1967 and 1986, which was located in the north of Essonne around Juvisy-sur-Orge and Massy.

Since 1988 control of the seat has switched between left and right in line with the national result.

== Historic Representation ==
| Election | Member | Party |
|---|---|---|
| 1967 | Pierre Juquin | PCF |
| 1968 | Jacques Mercier | UDR |
| 1973 | Pierre Juquin | PCF |
| 1978 | Pierre Juquin | PCF |
| 1981 | Claude Germon | PS |
| 1986 | Proportional representation – no election by constituency | |
| 1988 | Yves Tavernier | PS |
| 1993 | Jean de Boishue | RPR |
| 1995 | Geneviève Colot | RPR |
| 1997 | Yves Tavernier | PS |
| 2002 | Geneviève Colot | UMP |
| 2007 | Geneviève Colot | UMP |
| 2012 | Michel Pouzol | PS |
| 2017 | Laëtitia Romeiro Dias | LREM |
| 2022 | Alexis Izard | RE |
| 2024 | Steevy Gustave | LÉ |

== Election results ==
=== 2024 ===
| Candidate | Party | Alliance | First round | | | Second round | | |
| Candidate | Party | Alliance | Votes | % | +/– | Votes | % | +/– |
|---|---|---|---|---|---|---|---|---|
| Stefan Milosevic | RN | | 22,290 | 33.01 | +15.27 | 26,996 | 43.29 | N/A |
| Steevy Gustave | LÉ | NFP | 20,874 | 30.91 | -0.33 | 35,365 | 56.71 | +7.89 |
| Alexis Izard | RE | ENS | 20,189 | 29.90 | +4.25 | WITHDREW | | |
| Catherine Bompard | DVE | | 2,453 | 3.63 | N/A | | | |
| Denis Tranier | REC | | 925 | 1.37 | -2.54 | | | |
| Joëlle Lopes-Venot | LO | | 713 | 1.06 | +0.25 | | | |
| Salvador Ribeiro | DIV | | 82 | 0.12 | N/A | | | |
| Valid votes | | | 67,526 | 97.48 | -0.60 | 62,360 | 90.96 | -1.08 |
| Blank votes | | | 1,293 | 1.87 | +0.46 | 4,989 | 7.28 | +1.55 |
| Null votes | | | 451 | 0.65 | +0.14 | 1,211 | 1.77 | -0.47 |
| Turnout | | | 69,270 | 69.88 | +19.75 | 68,560 | 69.15 | +20.32 |
| Abstentions | | | 29,864 | 30.12 | -19.75 | 30,590 | 30.85 | -20.32 |
| Registered voters | | | 99,134 | | | 99,150 | | |
Source: Ministry of the Interior, Le Monde
| Result | | | | | | LÉ GAIN FROM RE | | |

=== 2022 ===
Legislative Election 2022: Essonne's 3rd constituency
| Party | Candidate | Votes | % | ±% |
|---|---|---|---|---|
| EELV (NUPÉS) | Steevy Gustave | 13,941 | 28.72 | +3.25 |
| LREM (Ensemble) | Alexis Izard | 12,447 | 25.65 | -9.35 |
| RN | Gilbert Mousnier | 8,612 | 17.74 | +5.14 |
| LR (UDC) | Isabelle Perdereau | 5,112 | 10.53 | −1.10 |
| DVE | Paul-Henri Baure | 1,978 | 4.08 | +2.27 |
| REC | Shéhérazade Chaa Benahmed | 1,899 | 3.91 | N/A |
| DVG | Mehdi Kemoune | 1,225 | 2.52 | N/A |
| DIV | Jean-Paul Charvillat | 1,121 | 2.31 | N/A |
| DLF (UPF) | Alice Moreira | 1,000 | 2.06 | N/A |
| Others | N/A | 1,200 | | |
| Turnout | | 49,481 | 50.13 | −0.29 |
2nd round result
| LREM (Ensemble) | Alexis Izard | 22,706 | 51.18 | -6.23 |
| EELV (NUPÉS) | Steevy Gustave | 21,659 | 48.82 | +6.23 |
| Turnout | | 44,365 | 48.82 | +9.40 |
| LREM hold | | | | |

=== 2017 ===
Legislative Election 2017: Essonne's 3rd constituency
| Party | Candidate | Votes | % | ±% |
|---|---|---|---|---|
| LREM | Laëtitia Romeiro Dias | 16,908 | 35.00 | |
| LFI | Virginie Araujo | 6,635 | 13.74 | |
| FN | François Helie | 6,085 | 12.60 | |
| PS | Michel Pouzol | 5,665 | 11.73 | |
| UDI | Nicolas Meary | 5,617 | 11.63 | |
| DVD | Bernard Sprotti | 3,929 | 8.13 | |
| DVD | Régis Duval | 1,001 | 2.07 | |
| Others | N/A | 2,463 | | |
| Turnout | | 48,303 | 50.42 | |
2nd round result
| LREM | Laëtitia Romeiro Dias | 21,684 | 57.41 | |
| LFI | Virginie Araujo | 16,089 | 42.59 | |
| Turnout | | 37,773 | 39.42 | |
| LREM gain from PS | | Swing | | |

=== 2012 ===
Legislative Election 2012: Essonne's 3rd constituency
| Party | Candidate | Votes | % | ±% |
|---|---|---|---|---|
| PS | Michel Pouzol | 17,325 | 32.18 | |
| UMP | Geneviève Colot | 15,541 | 28.87 | |
| FN | Françoise Andrieu | 8,635 | 16.04 | |
| EELV | Steevy Gustave | 4,105 | 7.62 | |
| FG | Philippe Camo | 3,775 | 7.01 | |
| MoDem | Nicolas Meary | 2,191 | 4.07 | |
| Others | N/A | 2,265 | | |
| Turnout | | 53,837 | 58.43 | |
2nd round result
| PS | Michel Pouzol | 27,202 | 52.98 | |
| UMP | Geneviève Colot | 24,141 | 47.02 | |
| Turnout | | 51,343 | 55.73 | |
| PS hold | | | | |

=== 2007 ===
Legislative Election 2007: Essonne's 3rd constituency
| Party | Candidate | Votes | % | ±% |
|---|---|---|---|---|
| UMP | Geneviève Colot | 25,572 | 44.46 | |
| PS | Brigitte Zins | 14,291 | 24.85 | |
| MoDem | Bertrand Julie | 6,977 | 12.13 | |
| LV | Laurence Bonzani | 2,253 | 3.92 | |
| PCF | Philippe Camo | 2,248 | 3.91 | |
| FN | Britgitte Dutey-Harispe | 2,143 | 3.73 | |
| Far left | Christelle Deparpe | 1,509 | 2.62 | |
| Others | N/A | 2,523 | | |
| Turnout | | 58,243 | 62.25 | |
2nd round result
| UMP | Geneviève Colot | 29,240 | 54.58 | |
| PS | Brigitte Zins | 24,336 | 45.42 | |
| Turnout | | 55,125 | 58.93 | |
| UMP hold | | | | |

=== 2002 ===
Legislative Election 2002: Essonne's 3rd constituency
| Party | Candidate | Votes | % | ±% |
|---|---|---|---|---|
| PS | Yves Tavernier | 19,629 | 34.53 | |
| UMP | Geneviève Colot | 18,891 | 33.24 | |
| FN | Roger Garnero | 6,452 | 11.35 | |
| UDF | Jean-Marc Tyberg | 5,080 | 8.94 | |
| PR | Christophe Lepage | 2,009 | 3.53 | |
| Others | N/A | 4,778 | | |
| Turnout | | 57,784 | 66.52 | |
2nd round result
| UMP | Geneviève Colot | 28,643 | 54.03 | |
| PS | Yves Tavernier | 24,371 | 45.97 | |
| Turnout | | 54,713 | 62.98 | |
| UMP gain from PS | | | | |

=== 1997 ===
Legislative Election 1997: Essonne's 3rd constituency
| Party | Candidate | Votes | % | ±% |
|---|---|---|---|---|
| RPR | Jean De Boishue | 15,229 | 28.31 | |
| PS | Yves Tavernier | 14,822 | 27.56 | |
| FN | François Salanié | 8,517 | 15.83 | |
| PCF | Philippe Camo | 4,387 | 8.16 | |
| DVD | Gérard Deletraz | 1,830 | 3.40 | |
| LO | Sylvie Lironcourt | 1,793 | 3.33 | |
| MRC | Christophe Lepage | 1,732 | 3.22 | |
| Far left | Thierry Berichvili | 1,619 | 3.01 | |
| GE | Akim Ali | 1,388 | 2.58 | |
| Others | N/A | 2,469 | | |
| Turnout | | 56,493 | 69.08 | |
2nd round result
| PS | Yves Tavernier | 29,816 | 52.58 | |
| RPR | Jean De Boishue | 26,888 | 47.42 | |
| Turnout | | 60,083 | 73.47 | |
| PS gain from RPR | | | | |

== Sources ==
Official results of French elections from 2002: "Résultats électoraux officiels en France" (in French).
