= Marie Guévenoux =

French politician (born 1976)

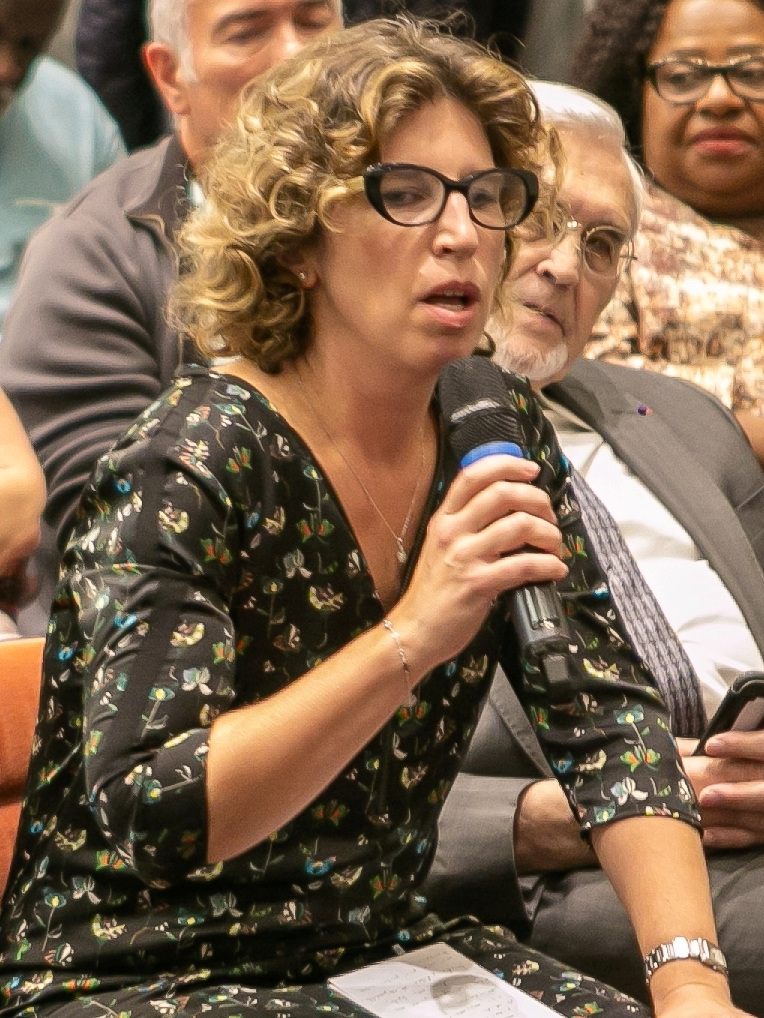
- Guévenoux in 2018

Minister Delegate for the Overseas
- In office 8 February 2024 – 21 September 2024
- Prime Minister: Gabriel Attal
- Preceded by: Philippe Vigier
- Succeeded by: François-Noël Buffet

Member of the National Assembly for Essonne's 9th constituency
- In office 21 June 2017 – 8 March 2024
- Preceded by: Thierry Mandon
- Succeeded by: Éric Husson

Personal details
- Born: 2 November 1976 (age 49) Amiens, France
- Party: The Republicans (until 2017); Renaissance (since 2017)

Marie Guévenoux (French pronunciation: [maʁi ɡevənu]; born 2 November 1976) is a French politician who briefly served as Minister Delegate for the Overseas in the government of Prime Minister Gabriel Attal from February to September 2024. A member of Renaissance (RE, formerly La République En Marche!), she previously was a deputy in the National Assembly from 2017 to 2024, representing the Essonne department.

== Political career ==
=== Early beginnings ===
In The Republicans' primaries ahead of the 2017 presidential election, Guévenoux was part of candidate Alain Juppé's campaign staff. When François Fillon was chosen as the party's candidate, she became his campaign team's administrative and financial director. Amid the Fillon affair, however, she resigned from that position and left the Republicans' campaign.

=== Member of the National Assembly ===
In the 2017 French legislative election, Guévenoux joined the LREM campaign and became a member of the National Assembly. In parliament, she served on the Committee on Legal Affairs. She was also a secretary of the Bureau of the National Assembly of the 15th legislature of the French Fifth Republic. In early 2018, she was one of several LREM members who joined an informal parliamentary working group on Islam set up by Florent Boudié in order to contribute to the government's bill aimed at better organising and supervising the financing of the Muslim faith in France. Later that year, she co-chaired (with Éric Bothorel) a group of some twenty parliamentarians involved in organizing a nation-wide consultation process in response to the Yellow vests movement.

In addition to her parliamentary work, Guévenoux was a member of the Commission consultative du secret de la défense nationale (CCSDN), an independent authority in charge of declassification of documents.

From November 2017 on, Guévenoux was part of LREM's 20-member executive board under the leadership of the party's chairman Christophe Castaner.

=== Later career ===
In 2025, Guévenoux was appointed special adviser to Minister of Justice Gérald Darmanin.

In 2026, Guévenoux joined the leadership team for Édouard Philippe’s 2027 presidential campaign, alongside Christophe Béchu and Gilles Boyer.

== Political positions ==
In July 2019, Guévenoux voted in favour of the French ratification of the European Union's Comprehensive Economic and Trade Agreement (CETA) with Canada.

== See also ==
- 2017 French legislative election
