= Georges Tron =

French politician

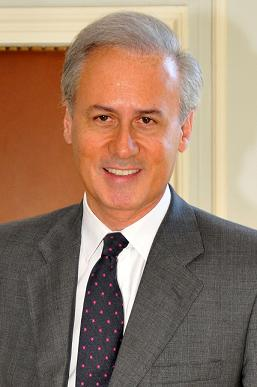

Mayor of Draveil
- In office 25 June 1995 – 25 May 2021
- Preceded by: Jean Tournier-Laserve
- Succeeded by: Vacant

Member of the National Assembly for Essonne's 9th constituency
- In office 2 April 1993 – 23 April 2010
- Preceded by: Thierry Mandon
- Succeeded by: Françoise de Salvador
- In office 30 June 2011 – 19 June 2012
- Preceded by: Françoise de Salvador
- Succeeded by: Thierry Mandon

Secretary of State for Civil Service
- In office 22 March 2010 – 29 May 2011
- President: Nicolas Sarkozy
- Prime Minister: François Fillon

Personal details
- Born: 1 August 1957 (age 68) Neuilly-sur-Seine, France
- Party: The Republicans
- Education: Lycée Saint-Louis-de-Gonzague

Georges Tron (born 1 August 1957 in Neuilly-sur-Seine) is a French politician. He served as Secretary of Public Affairs in the Cabinet of François Baroin but resigned after accusations of sexual assault were made against him. He was mayor of Draveil from 1995 to 2021, and only resigned from that role several months into his 3-years prison sentence for rape.

== Biography ==
Georges Tron received his Baccalauréat at the Lycée Saint-Louis-de-Gonzague in 1975 and a Masters in Public Law. In 1986, he was appointed as parliamentary advisor to Édouard Balladur, then Minister of Economy and Finance. From 1988 to 1993, he served as Chief of Staff for Balladur. From 1997 to 2002, he served as budgetary advisor to the Prime Minister, Lionel Jospin.

In 1999, he served as National Secretary of the Rally for the Republic and in 2002, he joined the Union for a Popular Movement.

He became President of the Union des Jeunes pour le Progrès. Since 1993, he has been a deputy of Essonne. Since 1995, he has been Mayor of Draveil. Since 2003, he has been the President of Communauté d'Agglomération Sénart Val de Seine. In 2009, he joined the Deslierres & Associés law firm.

In May 2011, George Tron became the subject of a preliminary investigation into charges of sexual harassment after two women, one represented by Yael Mellul, alleged that he had attacked them between 2007 and 2010, which led him to resign as a junior minister for the civil service, tendering his resignation to French President Nicolas Sarkozy. Tron linked the case to a feud with relatives of Presidential candidate Marine Le Pen, who announced she would sue him for libel.

In February 2021, he was sentenced on appeal to 5 years of imprisonment (with 2 of those suspended) for the sexual harassment and rape of his former employee. He initially refused to resign and ran the town from his jail cell for several months, but he eventually resigned in May 2021.

== Political career ==
Governmental functions

Secretary of State for Public Service : 2010-2011 (Resignation)

Electoral mandates

National Assembly of France

Member of the National Assembly of France for Essonne (9th constituency) : 1993-2010 (He became secretary of state in 2010) / Since 2011. Elected in 1993, reelected in 1997, 2002, 2007.

Municipal Council

Mayor of Draveil : Since 1995. Reelected in 2001, 2008, 2014, 2020.

Municipal councillor of Draveil : Since 1995. Reelected in 2001, 2008.

Agglomeration Community Council

President of the Agglomeration Community Sénart Val de Seine : Since 2003. Reelected in 2008.

Member of the Agglomeration Community Sénart Val de Seine : Since 2003. Reelected in 2008.
