= Éric Husson =

French politician

Member of the National Assembly of France for Essonne's 9th constituency
- In office 9 March 2024 – 9 June 2024
- Preceded by: Marie Guévenoux
- Succeeded by: Julie Ozenne

Personal details
- Born: 6 July 1963 (age 61); Châteaudun, France
- Political party: RE

Eric Husson (born 6 July 1963) is a French sports leader and politician.

== Career ==
He was President of USRO rugby in Ris-Orangis and has been involved in the community for 30 years in Ris-Orangis. He succeeded Marie Guévenoux on 9 March 2024 as deputy of Essonne when she was appointed Minister Delegate for Overseas in the Gabriel Attal government.
