= Alexis Izard =

French politician

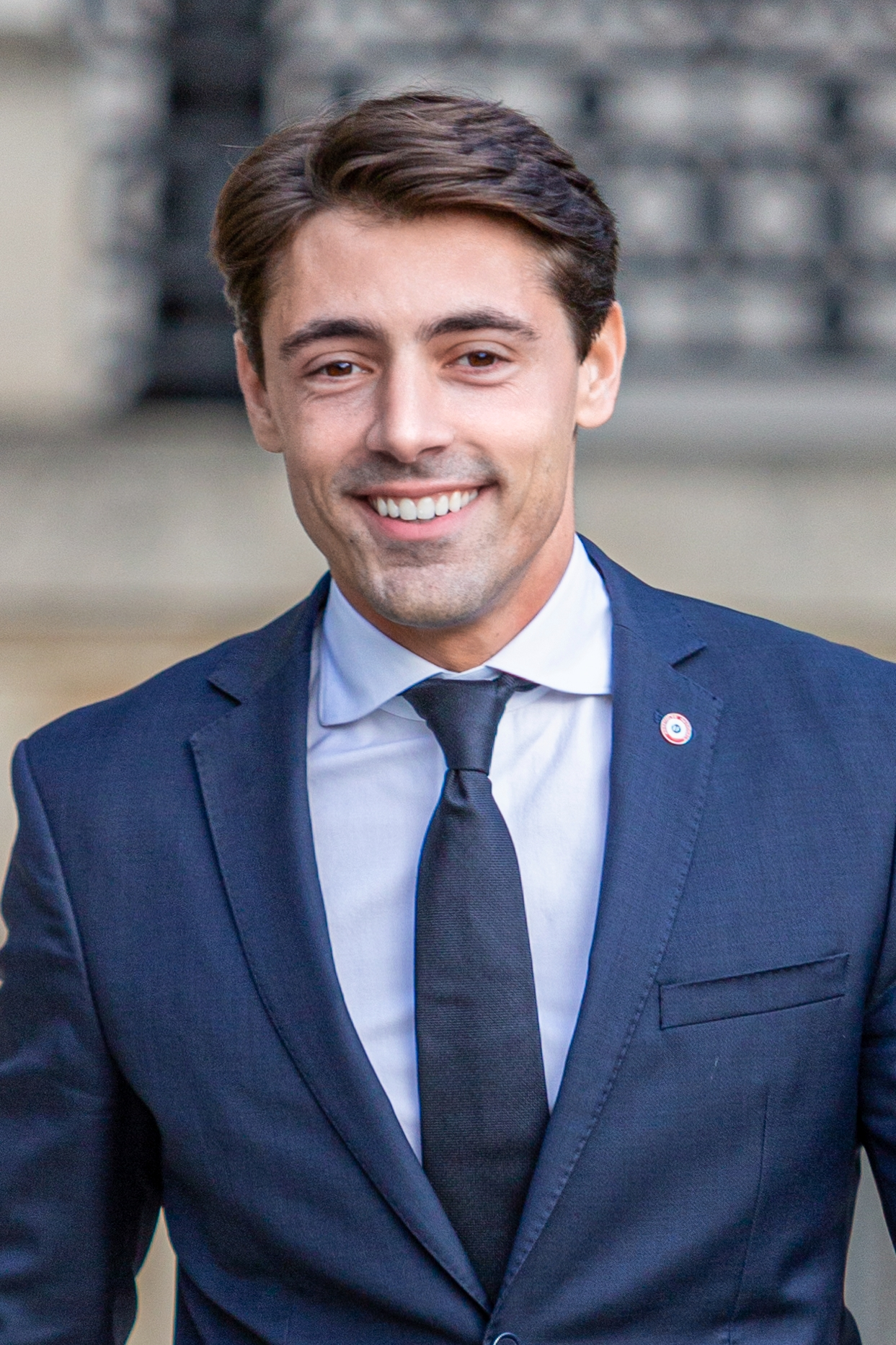
- Alexis Izard in 2022.

Member of the National Assembly for Essonne's 3rd constituency
- In office 22 June 2022 – 9 June 2024
- Preceded by: Laëtitia Romeiro Dias
- Succeeded by: Steevy Gustave

Personal details
- Born: 15 June 1992 (age 33) Sèvres, Hauts-de-Seine, France
- Party: LREM/RE (since 2020)
- Occupation: Business executive

Alexis Izard, born on 15 June 1992 (age 33) in Sèvres, Hauts-de-Seine, is a French politician.

A member of Renaissance, he was elected as a Member of the National Assembly for Essonne's 3rd constituency in the 2022 legislative elections until the 2024 legislative elections.

In December 2024, he was appointed as the ministerial delegate in charge of economic protection of consumers at the Ministry of the Economy, Finance, and Industrial and Digital Sovereignty.

== Biography ==
An executive at Bpifrance, Alexis Izard first ran in the 2020 municipal elections in Savigny-sur-Orge, where he was elected as a municipal councilor.

As the departmental referent for La République En Marche!, he was nominated as the Ensemble candidate for the 2022 legislative elections in Essonne's 3rd constituency. His substitute was Nadia Le Bournot, a municipal councilor in Dourdan. He placed second in the first round with 25.65%, behind the candidate of the NUPES, Steevy Gustave, whom he defeated in the second round with 51.18% of the votes.

He was thus elected as the deputy for Essonne's 3rd constituency on 19 June 2022 and joined the Economic Affairs Committee at the National Assembly.

Since Wednesday, 13 September 2023, Alexis Izard has been one of the spokespersons for the Renaissance group in the National Assembly.

On 22 February 2024, Prime Minister Gabriel Attal appointed Alexis Izard to conduct a parliamentary mission to assess a potential evolution of the legislative and regulatory framework of the EGalim laws and, more broadly, commercial negotiations.

Placing third in the first round of the 2024 legislative elections on 30 June 2024 with 29.9% of the votes, behind Steevy Gustave of the Nouveau Front populaire with 30.91% and the candidate of the RN with 33.01% of the votes, Alexis Izard withdrew on Monday, 1 July 2024, in favor of the left-wing candidate to block the RN.

In December 2024, he was appointed as the ministerial delegate in charge of economic protection of consumers at the Ministry of the Economy, Finance, and Industrial and Digital Sovereignty.

== See also ==
- List of deputies of the 16th National Assembly of France
