= Romain Colas =

French politician (born 1979)

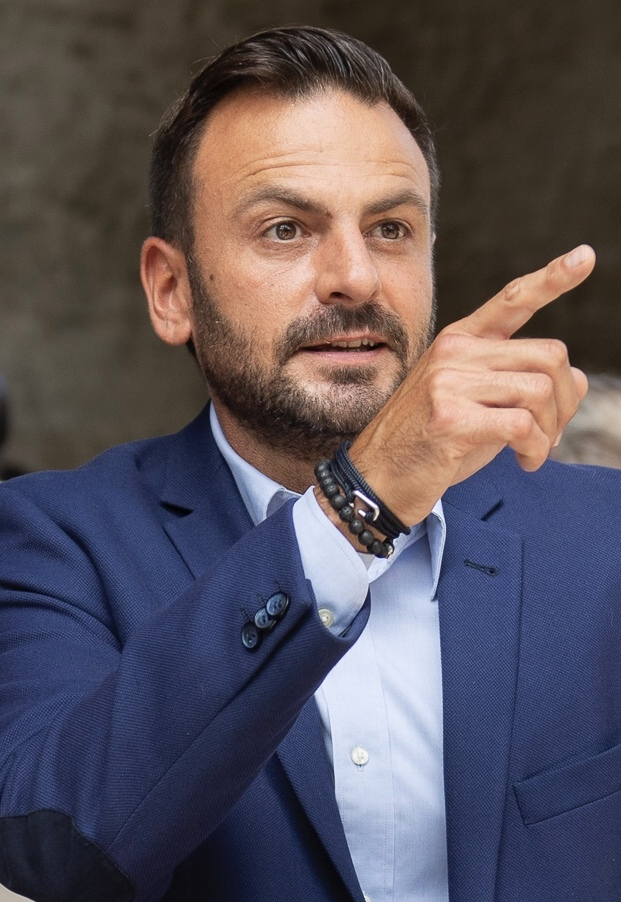
- Colas in 2021

Member of the French National Assembly for Essonne's 9th constituency
- In office 4 July 2014 – 17 June 2017
- Preceded by: Thierry Mandon
- Succeeded by: Thierry Mandon

Personal details
- Born: 22 November 1979 (age 46)
- Party: Socialist Party

Romain Colas (born 22 November 1979) is a French politician serving as mayor of Boussy-Saint-Antoine since 2008. From 2014 to 2017, he was a member of the National Assembly.
