= Arrondissements of the Essonne department =

Administrative divisions of Essonne, France

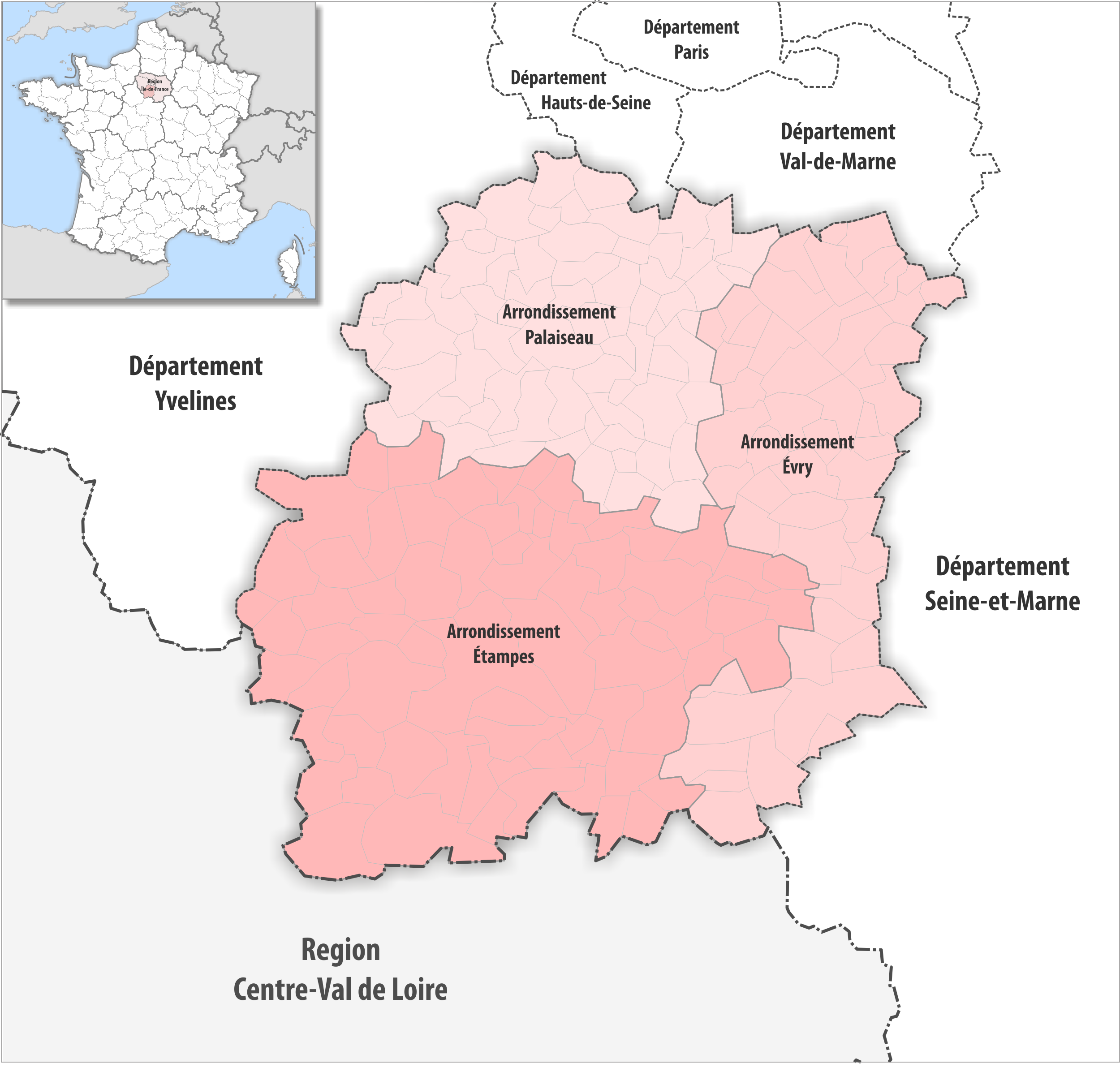
Map of arrondissements of the Essonne department.

The 3 arrondissements of the Essonne department are:

1. Arrondissement of Étampes, (subprefecture: Étampes) with 75 communes. The population of the arrondissement was 133,168 in 2021.
2. Arrondissement of Évry, (prefecture of the Essonne department: Évry-Courcouronnes) with 51 communes. The population of the arrondissement was 542,688 in 2021.
3. Arrondissement of Palaiseau, (subprefecture: Palaiseau) with 68 communes. The population of the arrondissement was 637,912 in 2021.

== History ==
In 1800 the arrondissements of Corbeil and Étampes were established as part of the department Seine-et-Oise. The arrondissement of Étampes was disbanded in 1926. The arrondissement of Palaiseau was created in 1962. In 1966 the arrondissement of Corbeil was disbanded, Étampes was restored, and Évry was created. In 1968 the department Seine-et-Oise was disbanded, and the arrondissements of Évry, Étampes and Palaiseau became part of the new department Essonne.

In January 2017 three communes passed from the arrondissement of Étampes to the arrondissement of Palaiseau.
