= Essonne's 2nd constituency =

Constituency of the National Assembly of France

2nd constituency of Essonne
- inline Constituency of the National Assembly of France

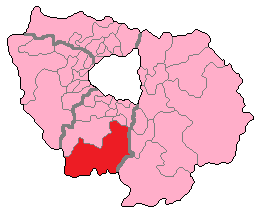
- Essonne's 2nd Constituency shown within Île-de-France
- Deputy: Nathalie Da Conceicao Carvalho; RN
- Department: Essonne
- Cantons: Mennecy, Milly-la-Forêt, Étampes, La Ferté-Alais et Méreville
- Registered voters: 90,740

The 2nd constituency of Essonne is a French legislative constituency in the Essonne département. It elects one Member of Parliament to the National Assembly of France.

== Description ==
The 2nd constituency of Essonne is the largest by area in department and covers its rural south and east portions.

The seat consistently elected Gaullist candidates from its creation in 1967 to 2022, with the sole exception of between 1981 and 1986. There has, however, been substantial boundary changes since then so the results are not strictly comparable. In both 1993 and 1997 the opposition to the mainstream conservative candidate in the second round came from the National Front rather than from the left.

== Historic representation ==
Election	Member	Party
1967	Michel Boscher	UDR
1968	Michel Boscher	UDR
1973	Michel Boscher	UDR
1978	Bernard Pons	RPR
1981	Jacques Guyard	PS
1986	Proportional representation – no election by constituency	
1988	Xavier Dugoin	RPR
1993	Xavier Dugoin	RPR
1995	Franck Marlin	RPR
1997	Franck Marlin	RPR
2002	Franck Marlin	UMP
2007	Franck Marlin	UMP
2012	Franck Marlin	UMP
2017	Franck Marlin	LR
2020	Bernard Bouley	LR
2022	Nathalie Da Conceicao Carvalho	RN
2024	Nathalie Da Conceicao Carvalho	RN

== Election results ==
=== 2024 ===
Candidate	Party	Alliance	First round			Second round		
Candidate	Party	Alliance	Votes	%	+/–	Votes	%	+/–
Nathalie Da Conceicao Carvalho	RN		24,608	40.30	+17.39	28,898	52.46	-0.81
Mathieu Hillaire	LFI	NFP	16,207	26.54	+1.88	26,193	47.54	+0.81
Naïma Sifer	HOR	ENS	13,490	22.09	+1.48	WITHDREW		
Pierre Mayeur	DVD		2,054	3.36	N/A			
Alexandre Lienhard	DVE		1,754	2.87	N/A			
Jacques Borie	DVE		1,389	2.27	N/A			
Carla Tarcy	REC		1,045	1.71	-3.43			
Mathilde Phan Hieu	LO		517	0.85	-0.12			
Valid votes			61,604	97.18	-0.76	55,091	89.49	+3.07
Blank votes			1,276	2.03	+0.55	5,115	8.31	-2.48
Null votes			493	0.78	+0.21	1,356	2.20	-0.59
Turnout			62,833	67.62	+19.94	61,562	66.22	+19.90
Abstentions			30,085	32.38	-19.94	31,402	33.78	-19.90
Registered voters			92,918			92,964		
Source: Ministry of the Interior, Le Monde
Result						RN HOLD		

=== 2022 ===
Legislative Election 2022: Essonne's 2nd constituency
Party	Candidate	Votes	%	±%
LFI (NUPÉS)	Mathieu Hillaire	10,588	24.66	+6.17
RN	Nathalie Da Conceicao Carvalho	9,839	22.91	+8.07
HOR (Ensemble)	Naïma Sifer	8,848	20.61	−9.27
UDI (UDC)	Jean-Philippe Dugoin-Clement	6,276	14.62	−16.20
REC	Eveline Bryon	2,208	5.14	N/A
DVD	Antonin Morelle	1,483	3.45	N/A
DVD	Mama Sy	1,132	2.64	N/A
DVG	François Parolini	946	2.20	N/A
Others	N/A	1,617		
Turnout		43,836	47.68	−1.63
2nd round result
RN	Nathalie Da Conceicao Carvalho	19,607	53.27	N/A
LFI (NUPÉS)	Mathieu Hillaire	17,203	46.73	N/A
Turnout		36,810	46.32	+6.31
RN gain from LR				

=== 2017 ===
Legislative Election 2017: Essonne's 2nd constituency
Party	Candidate	Votes	%	±%
LR	Franck Marlin	13,793	30.82	
MoDem	Daphné Ract-Madoux	13,371	29.88	
FN	Valérie Girard	6,643	14.84	
LFI	Michaël Goasdoué	5,475	12.23	
EELV	Patrick Polverelli	1,810	4.04	
DLF	Yannick Villardier	1,037	2.32	
PCF	Michele Kauffer	994	2.22	
Others	N/A	1,630		
Turnout		44,753	49.31	
2nd round result
LR	Franck Marlin	21,572	59.42	
MoDem	Daphné Ract-Madoux	14,731	40.58	
Turnout		36,303	40.01	
LR hold		Swing		

=== 2012 ===
Legislative Election 2012: Essonne's 2nd constituency
Party	Candidate	Votes	%	±%
UMP	Franck Marlin	21,212	41.49	
PS	Béatrice Perie	14,780	28.91	
FN	Franck Sailleau	7,455	14.58	
FG	François Jousset	2,826	5.53	
EELV	Xavier Guiomar	1,476	2.89	
Others	N/A	3,378		
Turnout		51,127	58.52	
2nd round result
UMP	Franck Marlin	28,279	58.98	
PS	Béatrice Perie	19,665	41.02	
Turnout		47,944	54.89	
UMP hold				

=== 2007 ===
Legislative Election 2007: Essonne's 2nd constituency
Party	Candidate	Votes	%	±%
UMP	Franck Marlin	28,506	54.99	
PS	Marie-Agnès Labarre	9,631	18.58	
MoDem	Béatrice Terres	4,337	8.37	
FN	Michelle Sakoschek	2,307	4.45	
PCF	Laurence Auffret Deme	1,832	3.53	
LV	Xavier Guiomar	1,523	2.94	
Far left	Corinne Donzaud	1,276	2.46	
Others	N/A	2,428		
Turnout		52,492	62.60	
UMP hold				

=== 2002 ===
Legislative Election 2002: Essonne's 2nd constituency
Party	Candidate	Votes	%	±%
UMP	Franck Marlin	23,810	48.47	
PCF	Gerard Lefranc	13,146	26.76	
FN	Hubert Mesmey De	6,519	13.27	
LCR	Emilie Deson	1,068	2.17	
Others	N/A	4,583		
Turnout		50,050	66.04	
2nd round result
UMP	Franck Marlin	28,341	64.08	
PCF	Gerard Lefranc	15,889	35.92	
Turnout		45,798	60.43	
UMP hold				

=== 1997 ===
Legislative Election 1997: Essonne's 2nd constituency
Party	Candidate	Votes	%	±%
RPR	Franck Marlin	14,670	31.33	
FN	Hubert De Mesmay	8,660	18.49	
PS	Elizabeth Doussain*	8,480	18.11	
PCF	Gérard Lefranc	5,571	11.90	
LV	Alain Coste	2,363	5.05	
DVD	Marie-Claire Guillerault	1,781	3.80	
GE	Béatrice Wauquier	1,381	2.95	
LO	Dominique Bazinet	1,276	2.72	
Others	N/A	2,644		
Turnout		49,367	68.70	
2nd round result
RPR	Franck Marlin	27,019	72.22	
FN	Hubert De Mesmay	10,392	27.78	
Turnout		48,466	67.46	
RPR hold				

* Socialist dissident

== Sources ==
Official results of French elections from 2002: "Résultats électoraux officiels en France" (in French).
