= Franck Marlin =

French politician

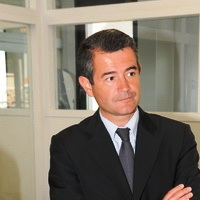
Franck Marlin, a member of the National Assembly of France

Franck Marlin (born September 30, 1964) was a Member of Parliament of the National Assembly of France. He represented the 2nd constituency of the Essonne département.

Marlin was born in Orléans, Loiret, and is a member of the Republicans.

On February 5, 2020, the newspaper Mediapart revealed "a mafia system" set up in the city of Étampes during Franck Marlin's term as mayor, and still active after his election as deputy. In 2021, the public prosecutor's office in Evry opened an investigation "for misappropriation of public funds, infringement of the freedom of access to a public contract, breach of trust and forgery". A search warrant was conducted on February 18, 2022 at the Etampes town hall.
