= Laëtitia Romeiro Dias =

French politician

Member of the National Assembly for Essonne's 3rd constituency
- Incumbent
- Assumed office 21 June 2017
- Preceded by: Michel Pouzol

Personal details
- Born: 15 January 1981 (age 45) Paris, France
- Party: La République En Marche!

Laëtitia Romeiro Dias is a French politician representing En Marche! She was elected to the French National Assembly on 18 June 2017, representing the Third Constituency of Essonne.

== See also ==
- 2017 French legislative election
