= Essonne's 9th constituency =

Constituency of the National Assembly of France

9th constituency of Essonne
- inline Constituency of the National Assembly of France

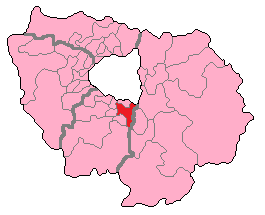
- Essonne's 9th Constituency shown within Île-de-France
- Deputy: Julie Ozenne; The Ecologists
- Department: Essonne
- Cantons: Draveil, Épinay-sous-Sénart, Ris-Orangis, Saint-Germain-lès-Corbeil
- Registered voters: 79,287

The 9th constituency of Essonne is a French legislative constituency in the Essonne département.

== Description ==
The 9th constituency of Essonne was one of six additional seats created in 1988 to address the rising population in the department.

Thierry Mandon of the PS re-captured the seat at the 2012 elections nineteen years after he lost it in 1993 to conservative Georges Tron.

== Historic Representation ==
Election	Member	Party
1988	Thierry Mandon	PS
1993	Georges Tron	RPR
1997	Georges Tron	RPR
2002	Georges Tron	UMP
2007	Georges Tron	UMP
2010	Françoise de Salvador	UMP
2011	Georges Tron	UMP
2012	Thierry Mandon	PS
2014	Romain Colas	PS
2017	Marie Guévenoux	LREM
2022	Marie Guévenoux	RE
2024	Éric Husson	RE
2024	Julie Ozenne	LÉ

== Election results ==
=== 2024 ===
Candidate	Party	Alliance	First round			Second round		
Candidate	Party	Alliance	Votes	%	+/–	Votes	%	+/–
Julie Ozenne	LÉ	NFP	19,288	37.60	+5.16	29,461	62.00	+13.27
Paul-Henri Merrien	RN		15,449	30.12	+14.26	18,057	38.00	N/A
Marie Guévenoux	RE	ENS	13,908	27.11	-2.68	WITHDREW		
Bruno Chamberlin	DIV		1,652	3.22	N/A			
Benoît Grisaud	LO		831	1.62	+0.19			
Sinan Boran	DIV		168	0.33	N/A			
Valid votes			51,296	97.39	-0.63	47,518	91.58	-1.82
Blank votes			1,057	2.01	+0.50	3,498	6.74	+1.94
Null votes			319	0.61	+0.13	869	1.67	-0.12
Turnout			52,672	66.02	+20.26	51,885	65.01	+19.92
Abstentions			27,115	33.98	-20.26	27,927	34.99	-19.92
Registered voters			79,787			79,812		
Source: Ministry of the Interior, Le Monde
Result						LÉ GAIN FROM RE		

=== 2022 ===
Legislative Election 2022: Essonne's 9th constituency
Party	Candidate	Votes	%	±%
EELV (NUPÉS)	Nadhera Beletreche	11,454	32.44	+3.56
LREM (Ensemble)	Marie Guévenoux	10,520	29.79	-5.31
RN	Philippe Steens	5,602	15.86	+5.41
UDI (UDC)	Faten Hidri	3,303	9.35	−7.69
REC	Paul-Henri Merrien	1,754	4.97	N/A
DLF	Lionel Mazurie	1,164	3.30	−0.06
DVE	Antonin Bernard	835	2.36	N/A
Others	N/A	680		
Turnout		36,028	45.76	−1.06
2nd round result
LREM (Ensemble)	Marie Guévenoux	17,005	51.27	-6.69
EELV (NUPÉS)	Nadhera Beletreche	16,164	48.73	N/A
Turnout		33,169	45.09	+11.33
LREM hold				

=== 2017 ===
Legislative Election 2017: Essonne's 9th constituency
Party	Candidate	Votes	%	±%
LREM	Marie Guévenoux	13,029	35.10	
LR	Véronique Carantois	6,326	17.04	
LFI	Anne Journel	5,016	13.51	
PS	Romain Colas	4,808	12.95	
FN	Thiebauld Vega	3,881	10.45	
DLF	Ourdia Ait-Allek	1,246	3.36	
EELV	Brigitte Baguet	960	2.59	
PCF	Laid Amrani	899	2.42	
Others	N/A	959		
Turnout		37,124	46.82	
2nd round result
LREM	Marie Guévenoux	15,513	57.96	
LR	Véronique Carantois	11,254	42.04	
Turnout		26,767	33.76	
LREM gain from PS		Swing		

=== 2012 ===
Legislative Election 2012: Essonne's 9th constituency
Party	Candidate	Votes	%	±%
PS	Thierry Mandon	17,032	39.57	
UMP	Georges Tron	11,663	27.10	
FN	Isabelle Cochard	6,063	14.09	
FG	Marie-France Winghardt	2,390	5.55	
DVD	Philippe Brun	1,554	3.61	
EELV	Marie-Cecile Lebrun	1,457	3.39	
DVD	Georges Pujals	1,320	3.07	
MoDem	Daphné Ract-Madoux	935	2.17	
Others	N/A	624		
Turnout		43,038	56.42	
2nd round result
PS	Thierry Mandon	23,011	56.75	
UMP	Georges Tron	17,536	43.25	
Turnout		40,547	53.16	
PS gain from UMP				

=== 2007 ===
Legislative Election 2007: Essonne's 9th constituency
Party	Candidate	Votes	%	±%
UMP	Georges Tron	21,770	48.86	
PS	Thierry Mandon	11,653	26.15	
MoDem	Caroline Chevasson	4,224	9.48	
LV	Michel Gruber	1,831	4.11	
FN	Liliane Ressicaud	1,522	3.42	
Far left	Jérôme Bonnard	1,073	2.41	
PCF	Amar Henni	1,070	2.40	
Others	N/A	1,417		
Turnout		45,050	60.74	
2nd round result
UMP	Georges Tron	23,391	55.78	
PS	Thierry Mandon	18,542	44.22	
Turnout		42,862	57.80	
UMP hold				

=== 2002 ===
Legislative Election 2002: Essonne's 9th constituency
Party	Candidate	Votes	%	±%
UMP	Georges Tron	20,762	47.23	
PS	Florence Leon Ploquin	11,538	26.25	
FN	Jean Legangneux	4,725	10.75	
LV	Helene Borel	1,661	3.78	
PCF	Isabelle Voisin	1,389	3.16	
Others	N/A	3,885		
Turnout		44,587	65.02	
2nd round result
UMP	Georges Tron	23,718	59.59	
PS	Florence Leon Ploquin	16,083	40.41	
Turnout		40,953	59.72	
UMP hold				

=== 1997 ===
Legislative Election 1997: Essonne's 9th constituency
Party	Candidate	Votes	%	±%
RPR	Georges Tron	13,022	30.17	
PS	Thierry Mandon	11,818	27.38	
FN	Sophie Lespagnon	7,280	16.87	
PCF	Michel Soubiran	3,492	8.09	
LV	Didier Chastanet	2,040	4.73	
LO	Michel Cremey	1,349	3.13	
DVD	Marcel Ribes	1,289	2.99	
GE	Jacques Laïk	1,208	2.80	
Others	N/A	1,663		
Turnout		44,826	66.46	
2nd round result
RPR	Georges Tron	22,900	50.80	
PS	Thierry Mandon	22,183	49.20	
Turnout		47,670	70.68	
RPR hold				

== Sources ==
Official results of French elections from 2002: "Résultats électoraux officiels en France" (in French).
