= Françoise de Salvador =

French politician

Member of Parliament of France
- In office April 23, 2010 – June 29, 2011

Personal details
- Born: July 18, 1952 (age 73) Paris, France
- Party: The Republicans group
- Occupation: Politician

Françoise de Salvador (born July 18, 1952, in Paris, France) is a French politician. UMP deputy, from 2010 to 2011 she was a deputy of the 9th arrondissement of Essonne.

== Biography ==
Françoise de Salvador was born on July 18, 1952, in Paris. She has two children.

Françoise de Salvador is a contract civil servant in charge of urban policy and economic integration at the Sénart Val de Seine urban community. She previously worked as a record producer and real estate agent.

=== Political career ===
A former Boussy-Saint-Antoine town councillor between 1995 and 2001, and again from 2008 to 2009, she headed the UMP list for the 2008 municipal elections, winning 33.03% of the vote in the first round, which saw the Socialist incumbent mayor win.

Françoise de Salvador was elected deputy for MP Georges Tron in the ninth constituency of Essonne in the 2007 legislative elections, winning 55.78% of the vote. Following Georges Tron's appointment as Secretary of state for the Civil Service in François Fillon's second government, she took up her seat at the Palais Bourbon on April 23, 2010. At the French National Assembly, she is a member of the UMP parliamentary group and the Foreign Affairs Committee. On June 29, 2011, she handed over to Georges Tron, who had resigned from the government.
