= Julie Ozenne =

French politician (born 1978)

Member of the National Assembly of France for Essonne's 9th constituency
- Incumbent
- Assumed office 8 July 2024
- Preceded by: Éric Husson

Personal details
- Born: 2 August 1978 (age 47) Granville, Manche
- Party: The Ecologists

Julie Ozenne (born 2 August 1978) is a French politician from Europe Ecology – The Greens (EELV). She was elected as a deputy to the National Assembly for the Essonne's 9th constituency in the 2024 French legislative election.

== Biography ==
Julie Ozenne is an architect by training. She is vice-president for Essonne of the RENARD association, which raises awareness among communities about respect for the environment and biodiversity.

She became known for having fought, with a collective of local residents, against the construction of a complex of 178 housing units in one of the parks of the town of Vigneux-sur-Seine, which threatened biodiversity in particular. She set up her own architectural firm specializing in assistance with rehabilitation.

She became involved in local group 91 of the Anticor association.

Julie Ozenne was elected in the legislative elections of July 2024 with 62% of the vote in the Essonne's 9th constituency, where she was opposed in the second round to the National Rally candidate Paul-Henri Merrien (38% of the vote).

== Details of functions and mandates ==
=== Mandates ===
- Since the 7 July 2024: MP of the 9th constituency of Essonne
- Opposition municipal councilor: city of Vigneux-sur-Seine

=== Legislative elections ===
Year	Party	Constituency	1st ^{round}			2nd ^{round}			Issue
Year	Party	Constituency	Votes	%	Place	Votes	%	Place	Issue
2024	LÉ (NFP)	9th of Essonne	19,288	37.60	1st	29,461	62.00	1st	Elected

== See also ==
- List of deputies of the 17th National Assembly of France
