= Thierry Mandon =

French politician

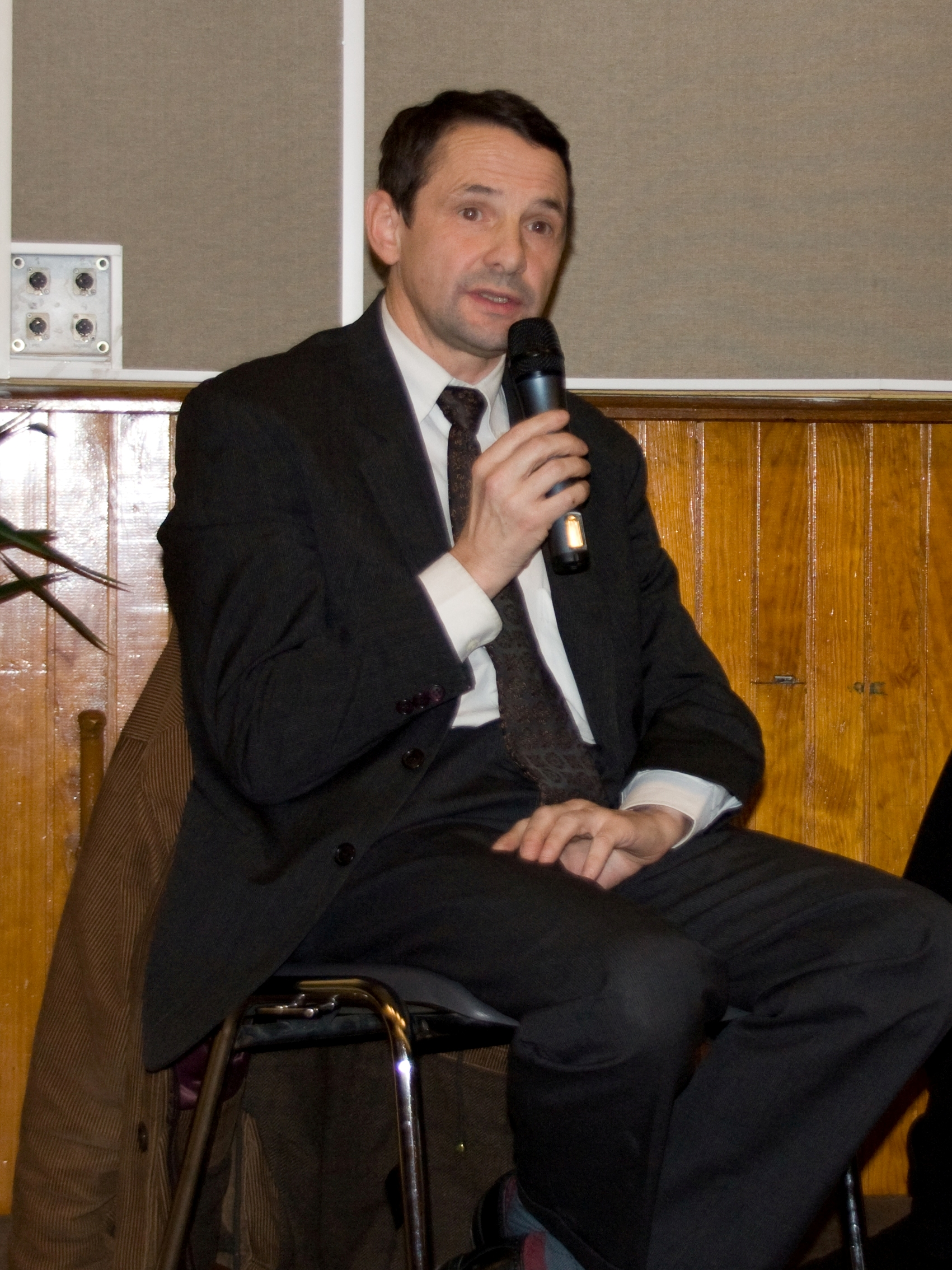
- Mandon in 2009

Secretary of State for Higher Education
- In office 17 June 2015 – 17 May 2017
- President: François Hollande
- Prime Minister: Manuel Valls; Bernard Cazeneuve
- Preceded by: Geneviève Fioraso
- Succeeded by: Frédérique Vidal

Member of the National Assembly for Essonne's 9th constituency
- In office 20 June 2012 – 3 July 2014
- Preceded by: Georges Tron
- Succeeded by: Romain Colas

Mayor of Ris-Orangis
- In office 18 June 1995 – 25 October 2012
- Preceded by: Daniel Perrin
- Succeeded by: Stéphane Raffalli

Personal details
- Born: 30 December 1957 (age 68) Lausanne, Vaud, Switzerland
- Party: Socialist Party
- Education: Sciences Po

Thierry Mandon (born 30 December 1957) is a French politician, a member of the Socialist Party, representative of the ninth constituency of Essonne from 1988 to 1993 and from 2012 to 2014, and speaker for the Socialist group at the National Assembly until his nomination in the government. He was also Mayor of Ris-Orangis between 1995 and 2012. On 3 June 2012, he was appointed Secretary of State for Public accounts and State reform in the First Valls Government. On 17 June 2015, he changed responsibilities, and became Secretary of State for Higher Education and Research in the Second Valls Government.
