= Nathalie da Conceicao Carvalho =

French politician

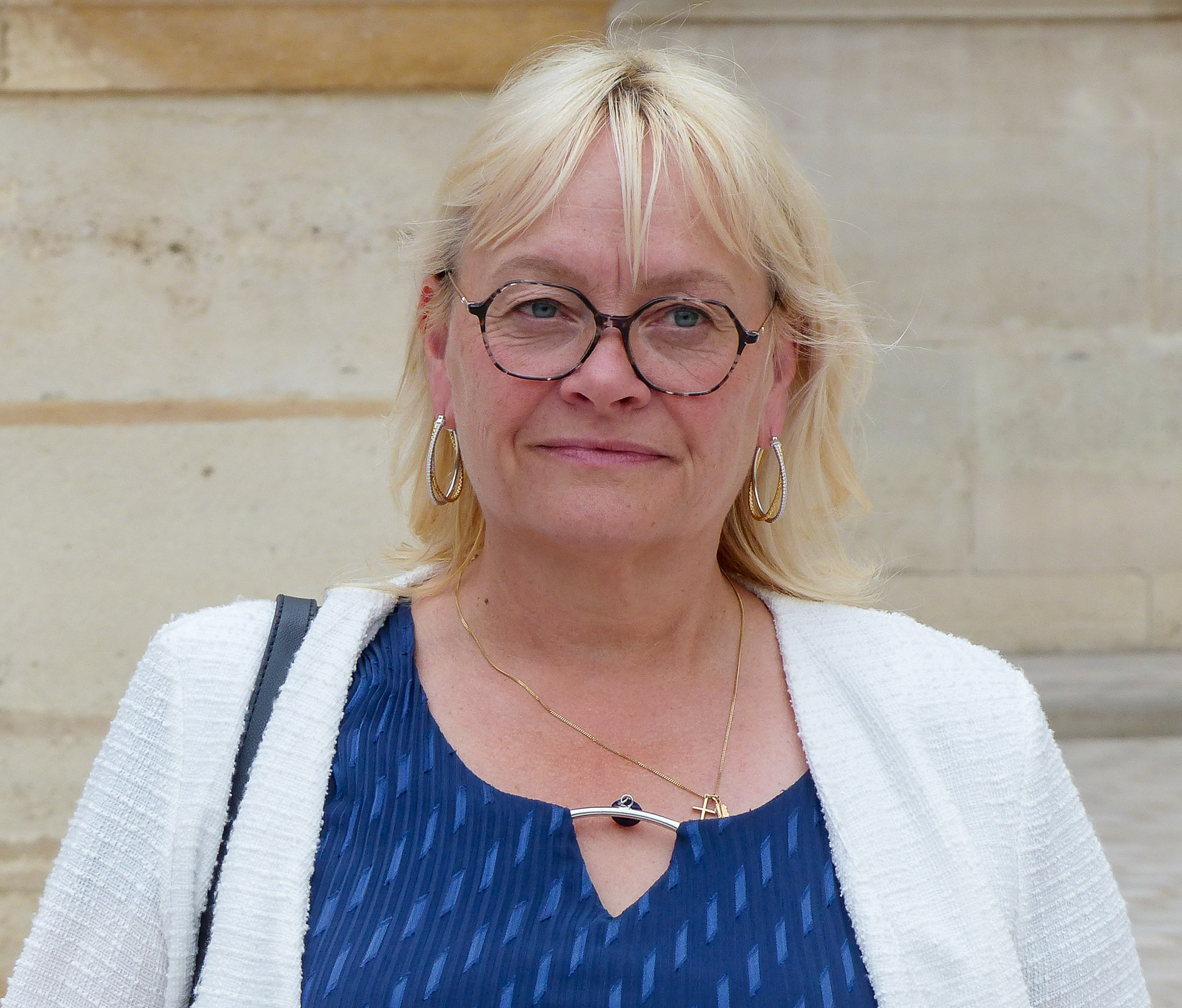

Member of the National Assembly for Essonne's 2nd constituency
- Incumbent
- Assumed office 22 June 2022
- Preceded by: Bernard Bouley

Personal details
- Born: 31 March 1966 (age 59); Blois, France
- Political party: National Rally

Nathalie da Conceicao Carvalho (born 31 March 1966) is a French politician of the National Rally (RN). She was elected to the National Assembly representing Essonne's 2nd constituency in the 2022 election.

== Biography ==
Da Conceicao Carvalho is of Portuguese descent, and was born in Blois, Loir-et-Cher to a supporter of the National Front (later National Rally). As of June 2022, she has four children and four grandchildren.

For the 2022 legislative election, Da Conceicao Carvalho was chosen as the RN candidate in Essonne's 2nd constituency, a more rural and right-leaning constituency than the rest of the department in the outskirts of Île-de-France. She came second to La France Insoumise (LFI) candidate Mathieu Hillaire in the first round but defeated him with 53.3% of the vote in the run-off to become Essonne's first RN deputy.

In the 2024 French legislative election, Da Conceicao Carvalho came first in the first round, which then went to a trinagulaire against Hillaire and against Naïma Sifer of Horizons within the Ensemble coalition; the latter withdrew. She won the run-off against Hillaire with 52.46% of the vote.
