= Michel Pouzol =

French politician (born 1962)

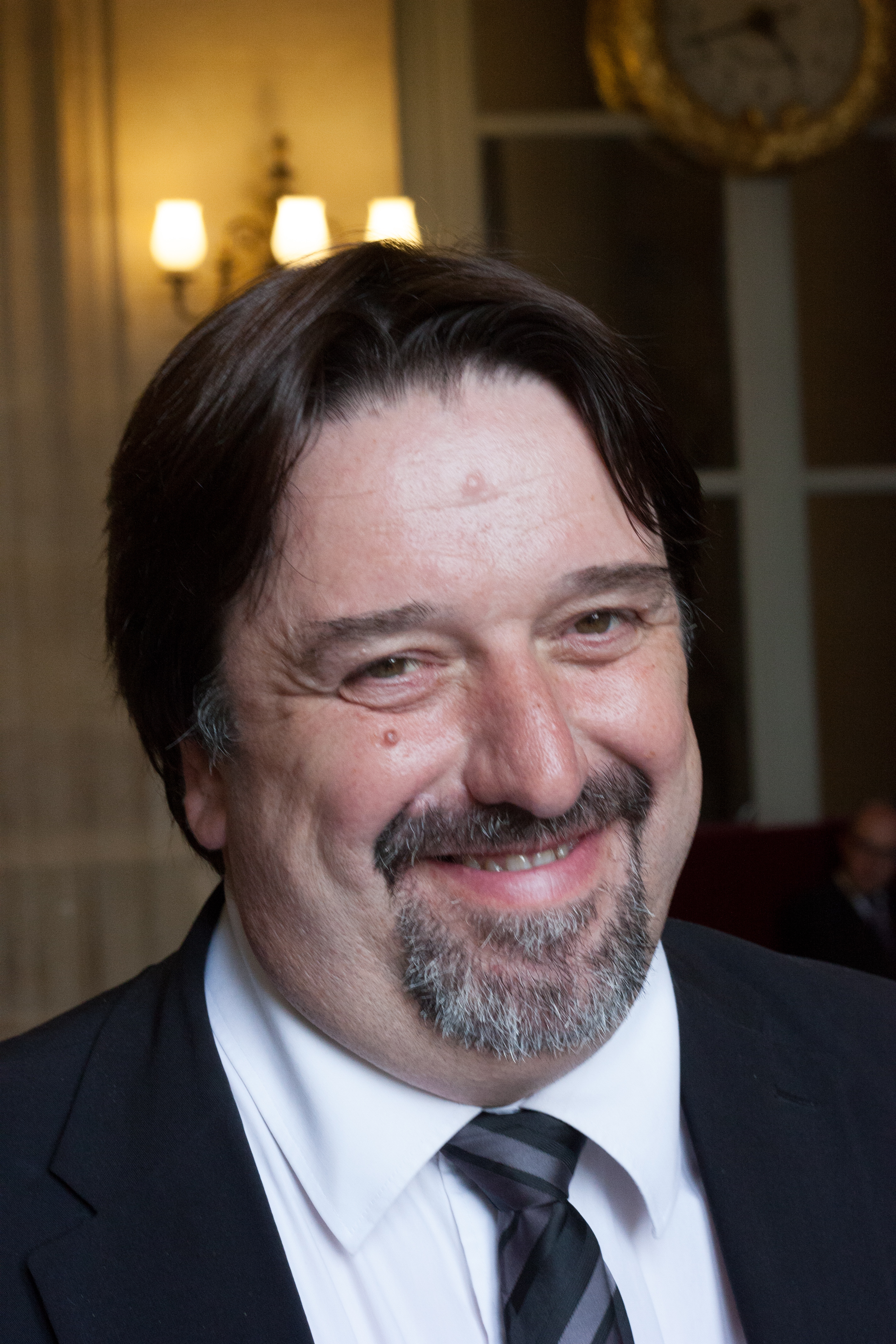
Pouzol in June 2012.

Michel Pouzol (born 5 July 1962) is a French politician, who was the former Deputy for the Third Constituency of Essonne from 17 June 2012 to 20 June 2017. Pouzol is a member of the Socialist Party.

== Biography ==
Pouzol was born on 5 July 1962 in Clermont-Ferrand.
