= Steevy Gustave =

French politician (born 1970)

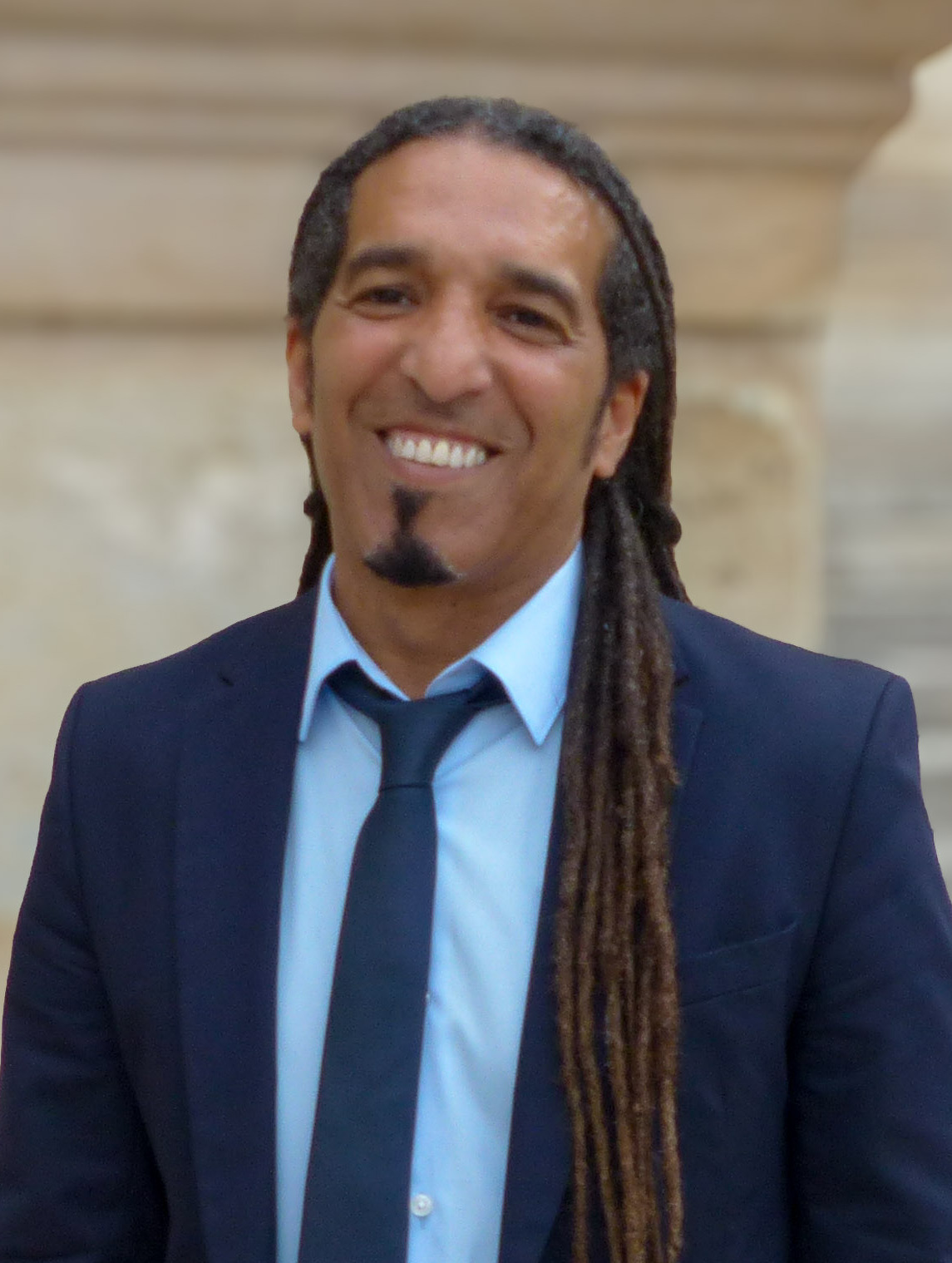
- Steevy Gustave in 2024

Member of the National Assembly for Essonne's 3rd constituency
- Incumbent
- Assumed office 8 July 2024
- Preceded by: Alexis Izard

Personal details
- Born: 5 February 1970 (age 56) Arpajon, France
- Party: The Ecologists
- Occupation: Politician, dancer, artistic producer

Steevy Gustave (born 5 February 1970) is a French politician, dancer and artistic producer. A member of The Ecologists, he was elected deputy of the National Assembly in July 2024 in the Essonne's 3rd constituency.

== Biography ==
The son of a soldier, Steevy Gustave spent his childhood in Chad and then in Djibouti, where his father, from Martinique, died in 1983 while serving in the French armed forces, leaving a 36-year-old widow and five children. At the age of 13, he returned to live with his family in Brétigny-sur-Orge. Steevy Gustave then became a ward of the Nation.

Passionate about dance, he launched into the hip hop scene. This passion led him to participate in the European Championship in 1989. At the time, he led a hip-hop dance association in Brétigny-sur-Orge.

In 1993, he met the singer France Gall during a scouting at the Théâtre Mogador in Paris, and for around ten years he was one of her dancers and her choreographer.

During the period 2007 to 2014, Steevy Gustave produced and programmed numerous artistic events.

In 2019, he created his events company LabeLife Events SAS.

He is the father of two daughters.

=== Political career ===
Committed to SOS Racisme, he was approached in 1995 to be part of a left-wing list for the municipal elections in his commune, Brétigny-sur-Orge. He embarked on the adventure, but immediately faced racist attacks. In a book, the mayor Jean de Boishue attacks his father in the guise of a fictional character, Tom - a reference to Uncle Tom. The outgoing mayor was re-elected but convicted by the Paris criminal court for "complicity in racial defamation".

Steevy Gustave joined the Brétigny-sur-Orge municipal council in 2001. From 2008 to 2014, he was deputy mayor Bernard Decaux (Socialist Party).

In 2015, the Minister of Justice, Christiane Taubira, included him in her cabinet. He was "in charge of the mission for people under the control of the justice system", i.e. enabling access to culture for prisoners.

In 2020, he ran in the municipal elections of Brétigny-sur-Orge but was defeated in the second round by the outgoing mayor Nicolas Méary. Steevy Gustave became the leader of the municipal opposition. Shortly before the elections, individuals broke into his home to tag his walls: "Dirty nigger, you won't be mayor".

== Candidacy for parliament ==
Steevy Gustave first stood as a candidate for Member of Parliament in Essonne's 3rd constituency in the 2012 French legislative election as a candidate for Europe Écologie Les Verts. He then declared to Le Parisien: "I am mixed race and I find that, visually speaking, the benches of the Assembly like those of the general council do not sufficiently resemble the benches of the schools of Essonne. I am not asking that we appoint people of colour because they are coloured, but, in the department, I am not going to believe that there are so few of us who get involved. The French are not racist, it is the governing bodies that are." Remarks which annoyed the Essonne left. He came in third place in the first round with 7.62% of the vote.

He ran again in 2022 under the Nupés label and came first in the first round with 28.72% of the vote but was beaten in the second round with 48.82% of the vote against Alexis Izard, LREM (ENS).

He ran as a candidate again in 2024 under the New Popular Front label, he came second in the first round with 30.91% of the vote and was elected in the second round, after the withdrawal of Alexis Izard, who was trailed by some six hundred votes, with 56.71% of the vote against the National Rally candidate Stefan Milosevic (45.47% of the vote).

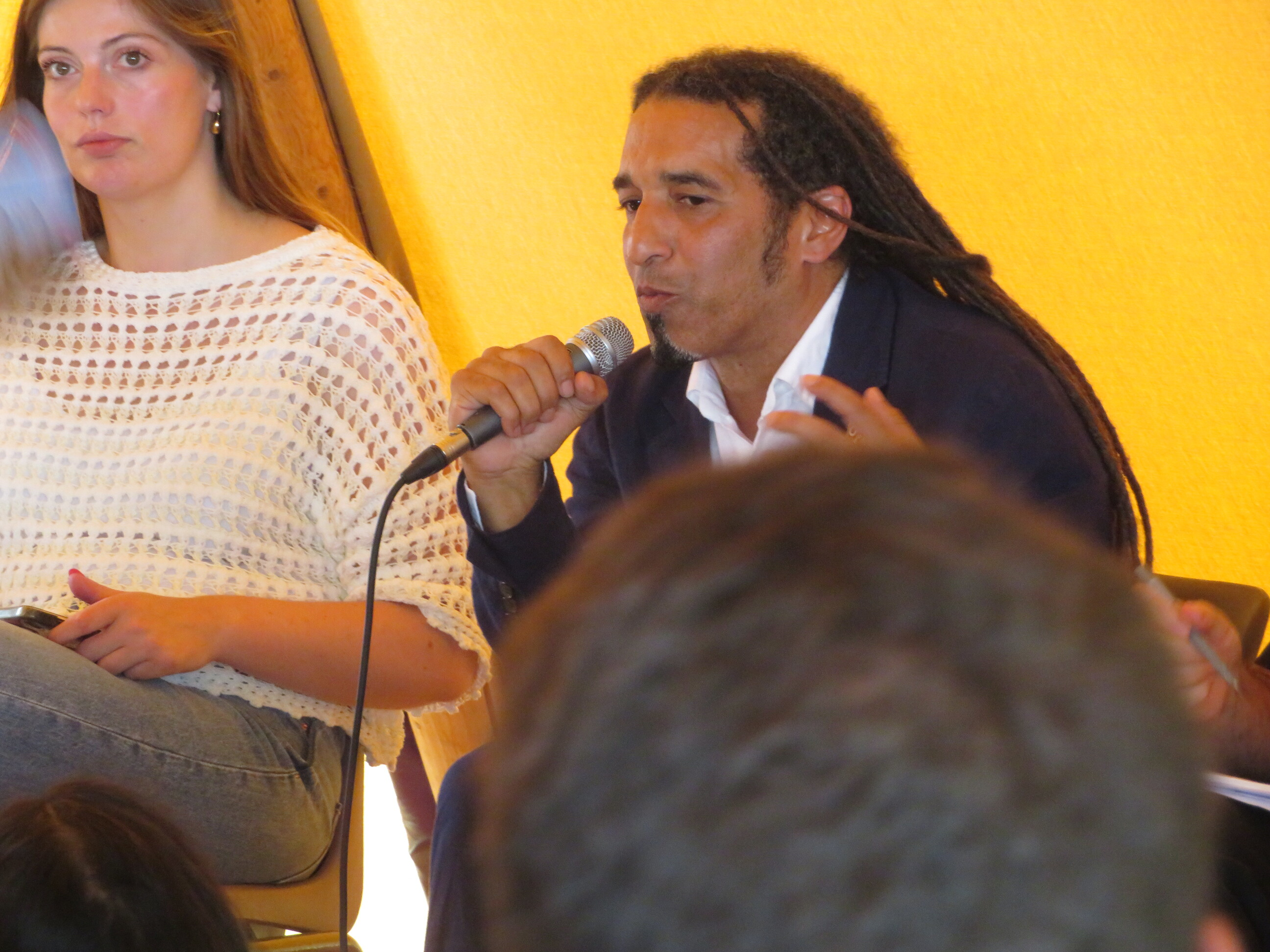
Steevy Gustave at the 2024 Ecologists' Summer Days.

On 9 July 2024, he was attacked by another MP with racist remarks, who particularly criticized his dreadlocks. In the Assembly, he sat on the Cultural and Education Affairs Committee.

== Electoral history ==
Year	Party	Constituency	1st ^{round}			2nd ^{round}			Issue
Year	Party	Constituency	Votes	%	Place	Votes	%	Place	Issue
2012	EELV	Essonne's 3rd constituency	4,105	7.62	4th				Beaten
2022	EELV	Essonne's 3rd constituency	13,941	28.72	1st	21,659	48.82	2nd	Beaten
2024	LÉ	Essonne's 3rd constituency	20,874	30.91	2nd	35,365	56.71	1st	Elected

== Mandates ==
- Since the 8 July 2024 : deputy for the 3rd constituency of Essonne

== Artistic production and programming ==
- 2007 : Touche pas à mon ADN (SOS Racisme, Libération, Charlie Hebdo) au Zénith de Paris avec Renaud, Adjani, Carla Bruni, Stomy Bugsy...
- De 2007 à 2012 Rire ensemble contre le racisme (partenariat UEJF), France 2, avec Gad, Kev Adams, Foresti, Boujenah, Arthur, Kavanah...
- 2010 : Concert Music Breaks Walls (UEJF, SOS Racisme et Coalition for Justice), Zougdidi (Géorgie), pour soutenir les populations déplacées d’Abkhazie et d’Ossétie du Sud (75 000 personnes) avec Youssou N'Dour, MC Solaar, Jane Birkin
- 2010 : Touche pas à ma nation (SOS Racisme, Libération, La Règle du jeu) au théâtre du Châtelet avec Ridan, Grace, Jeanne Moreau,...
- 2011 : Concert pour l’égalité 14 July (Direct Star, France 2) au Champ-de-Mars (1 200 000 personnes) avec (Yannick Noah, Nolwenn Leroy, Bénabar, Bic Ali..),
- 2013 : Concert pour tous, partenariat Inter-LGBT, place de la Bastille (35 000 personnes) avec Mika, Mademoiselle K, Les Lascars gays,...
- 2013 : Concert Droit de vote des étrangers (LDH, SOS racisme, UNEF) place de la Bastille (25 000 personnes) avec Tiken Jah Fakoly, Neg Marrons, HK et Les Saltimbanks...)
- 2013 : Concert pour la tolérance à Agadir (130 000 personnes) avec Rohff, Bernard Lavilliers, Michel Fugain, V V Brown...
- 2013 : Hip hop live hommage à Nelson Mandela au Bataclan avec Sexion d'assaut, Kenza Farah, Oxmo Puccino, Kery James...
- 2014 : Nuit du ramadan, France 2, avec Souad Massi, Idir, Tunisiano, Kenza Farah, HK et Les Saltimbanks, Younes
- 2014 : Concert pour l’UNEF République pour l’égalité avec Mokobé, Idir, Yvan Le Bolloc'h, Pigalle, Sophia Lorenians...
- 2014 : Hip hop live « Stop Ébola » Action contre la faim, diffusion sur France Ô et France 2, avec IAM, Médine, Youssoupha, Ärsenik

== See also ==
- List of deputies of the 17th National Assembly of France
