= Jean de Boishue =

French politician

- Born: Jean de Guéhéneuc de Boishue; September 12, 1943 (age 82); Boulogne-Billancourt, Hauts-de-Seine, France
- Occupation: Politician
- Political party: Rally for the Republic

Jean de Boishue (born 1943) is a French politician and author.

== Early life ==
Jean de Boishue was born on September 12, 1943, in Boulogne-Billancourt near Paris.

== Career ==
He joined the Rally for the Republic, a defunct center-right political party. He served as the mayor of Brétigny-sur-Orge from 1984 to 2001. He served as a member of the National Assembly from March 28, 1993, to April 21, 1997, representing Essonne.

== Bibliography ==
- Banlieue mon amour (Paris: Éditions de la Table ronde, 1995).
- Anti-Secrets (Paris: Editions Plon, 2015).
