= Essonne =

Department of France in Île-de-France

- Department of France
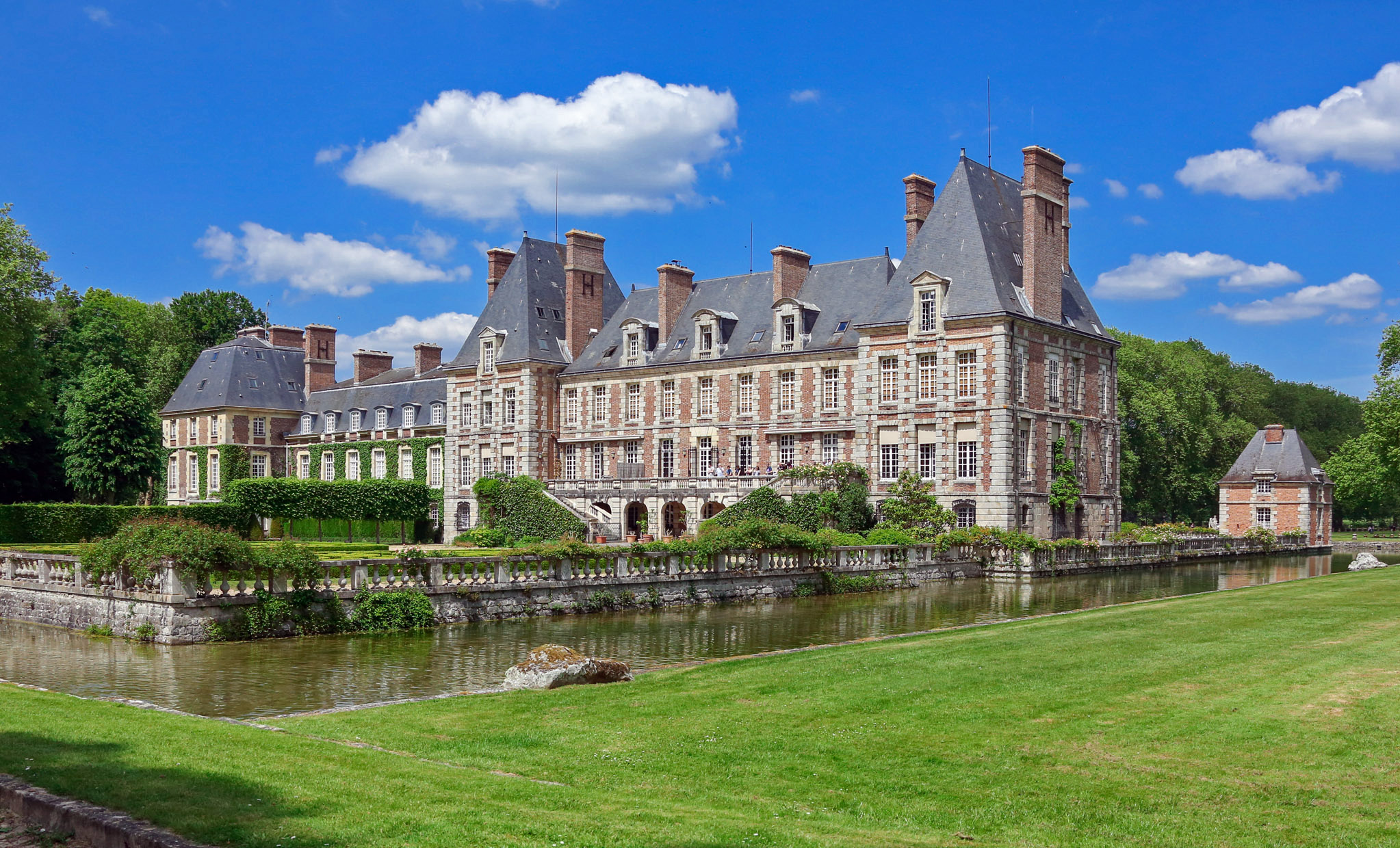
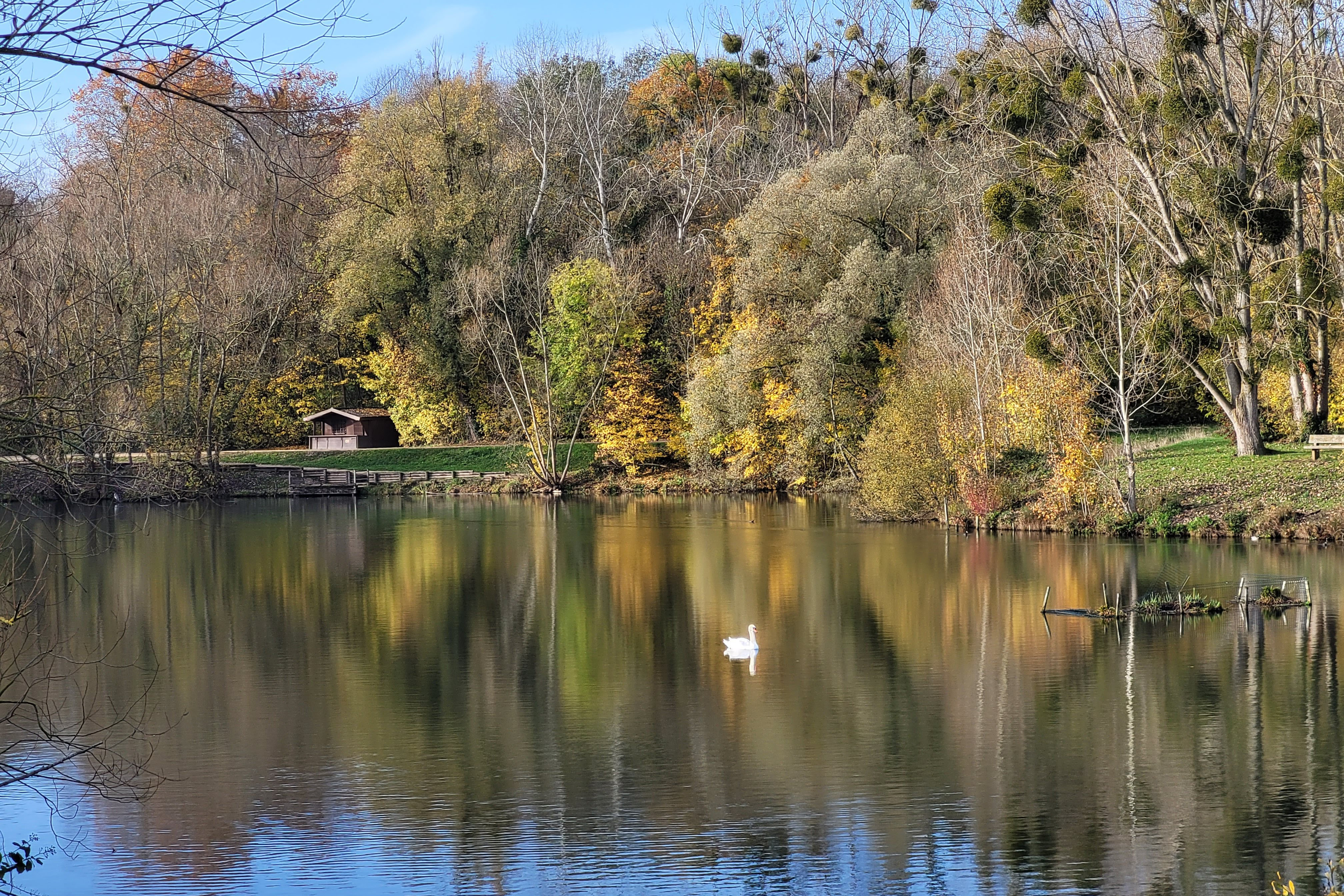
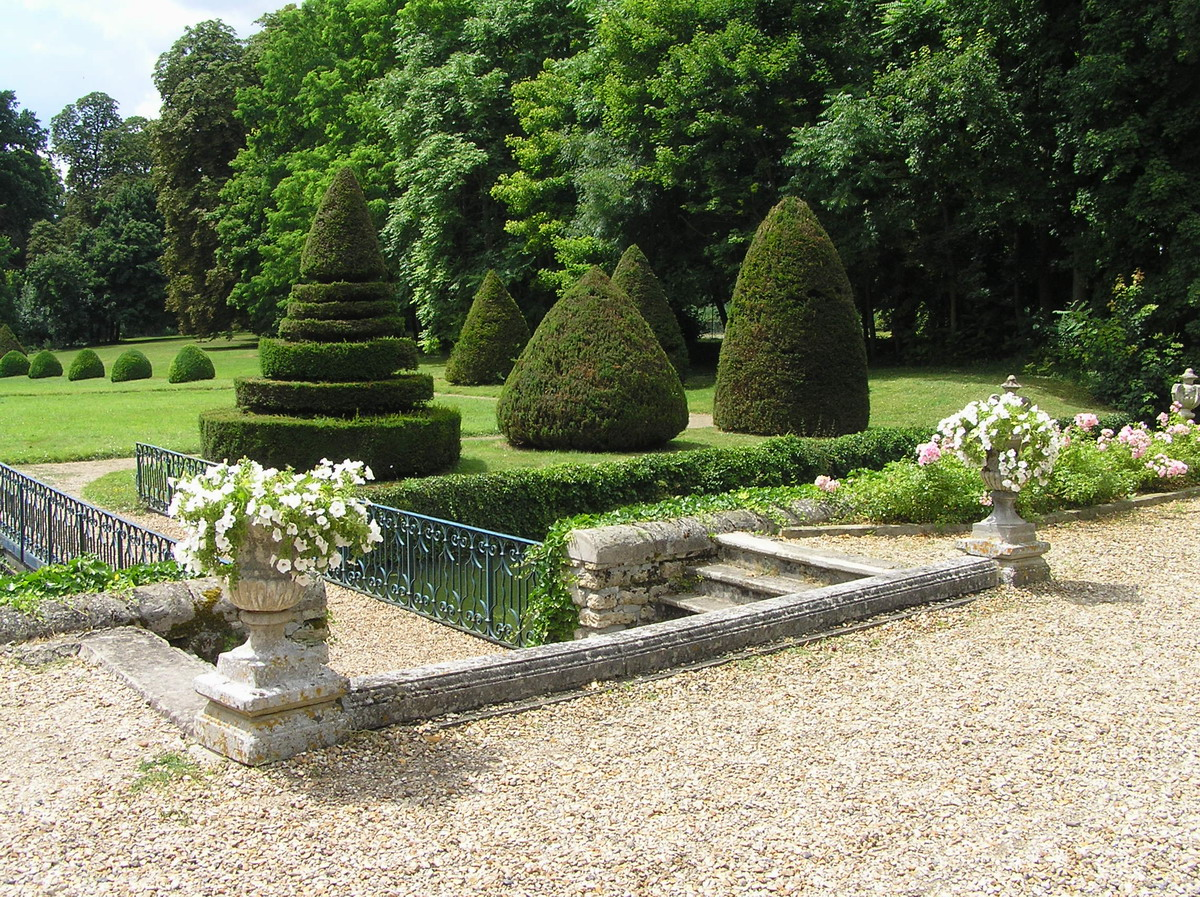
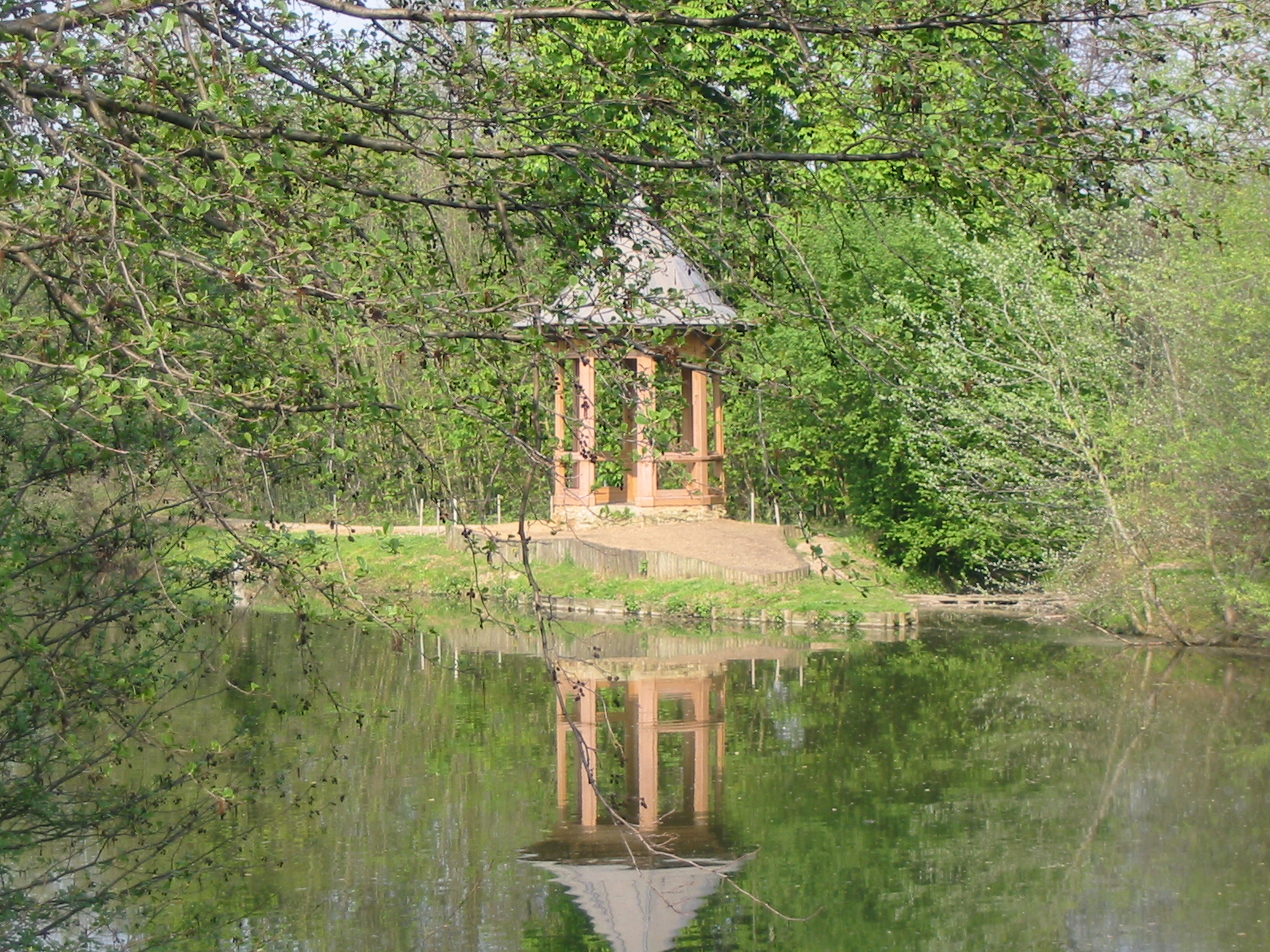
- From top down, left to right : view of Château de Courances, parc of Lormoy in Longpont-sur-Orge, Château du Saussay in Ballancourt-sur-Essonne, the gloriette near of Yerres river in Brunoy

- Flag Coat of arms

- Location of Essonne in France
- Coordinates: 48°30′N 02°17′E
- Country: France
- Region: Île-de-France
- Prefecture: Évry-Courcouronnes
- Subprefectures: Étampes; Palaiseau

Government
  - President of the Departmental Council: François Durovray (LR)
  - Prefect: Fabienne Balussou

Area^{1}
  - Total: 1,804 km^{2} (697 sq mi)

Population (2023)
  - Total: 1,338,485
  - Rank: 14th
  - Density: 742.0/km^{2} (1,922/sq mi)
- Demonym: Essonniens Essonniennes

GDP
  - Total: €58.462 billion (2021)
  - Per capita: €44,500 (2021)
- Time zone: UTC+1 (CET)
  - Summer (DST): UTC+2 (CEST)
- Postal code: 91000 - 91940
- ISO 3166 code: FR-91
- Department number: 91
- Arrondissements: 3
- Cantons: 21
- Communes: 194
- Website: essonne.fr
- ^1 French Land Register data, which exclude estuaries and lakes, ponds and glaciers larger than 1 km^{2}

Essonne (French pronunciation: [ɛsɔn]) is a department in the Île-de-France region of France. It is named after the river Essonne. It is bordered by Hauts-de-Seine, Val-de-Marne in the north, Yvelines in the west and Seine-et-Marne in the east. The department is a part of the Greater Paris region.

In 2023, it had a population of 1,338,485, across 194 communes.

Essonne was formed on 1 January 1968, when Seine-et-Oise was split into smaller departments. Its prefecture is Évry-Courcouronnes. Its INSEE and postcode number is 91.

== History ==
The Essonne department was created on 1 January 1968 from the southern portion of the former department of Seine-et-Oise.

In June 1963, Carrefour S.A. opened the first hypermarket in the Paris region at Sainte-Geneviève-des-Bois (although the word "hypermarché" was first used only in 1966). Based on the ideas put forward by the American logistics pioneer Bernardo Trujillo, the centre offered on a single 2,500 m^{2} (26,909.78 sq ft) site a hitherto unknown combination of wide choice and low prices, supported by 400 car parking spaces.

In 1969, the communes of Châteaufort and Toussus-le-Noble were separated from Essonne and added to the department of Yvelines.

== Geography ==
Essonne belongs to the region of Île-de-France.

It has borders with the departments of:

- Hauts-de-Seine and Val-de-Marne to the north,
- Seine-et-Marne to the east,
- Loiret to the south,
- Eure-et-Loir and Yvelines to the west.

All of northern Essonne department belongs to the Parisian agglomeration and is very urbanized. The south remains rural.

=== Principal towns ===
The most populous commune is Évry-Courcouronnes, the prefecture. As of 2019, the 5 most populous communes are:

Commune	Population (2023)
Évry-Courcouronnes	66,919
Corbeil-Essonnes	54,471
Massy	51,729
Savigny-sur-Orge	37,601
Palaiseau	37,471

In descending order, the other communes over 25,000 population are: Athis-Mons, Sainte-Geneviève-des-Bois, Vigneux-sur-Seine, Ris-Orangis, Viry-Châtillon, Draveil, Yerres, Étampes, Grigny, Brétigny-sur-Orge, Les Ulis and Brunoy. Milly-la-Forêt is a notable example of its more rural communes.

== Main sights ==
- The École Polytechnique. Founded in 1794, L'Ecole Polytechnique is one of the most prestigious engineering universities in France. This university was ranked 10th in the world by the Times Higher Education Supplement in 2005. Its campus is in the town of Palaiseau.
- Paris-Sud University. One of the best public schools in France, it is ranked 52nd by Academic Ranking of World Universities. It is best known for its mathematics department. Located in Orsay, Essonne, about 26,000 students are enrolled.
- The Headquarters of the Arianespace Company, a major commercial aerospace launcher, servicing companies who wish to launch satellites into space.
- Château de Montlhéry. Originally having been an ancient fort during Roman times, the first feudal lords began to inhabit the castle around 1000 AD. One major battle was fought in the castle during its lifetime. In 1465, Charles the Rash and French King Louis XI fought in the plains in front of the castle. In 1842, the reconstruction of the castle was started, and currently is being maintained by the local town of Montlhery
- Château de Courances
- The Forest of Sénart. Covering 3,500 hectares in area, this forest is very important to the local population. The local government has kept roads and agricultural companies from cutting down parts of this forest. The forest receives between two and three million visitors annually, and the government spends 1.2 million euros a year maintaining it.
- Telecom Sudparis. Situated in Évry, this is a grande école for engineers

== Politics ==
The department's most high-profile political representative has been Manuel Valls, who was Prime Minister of France from 31 March 2014 to 6 December 2016. Valls visited its main town, Évry, to deliver remarks following the Charlie Hebdo massacre of January 2015. The president of the Departmental Council is François Durovray, elected in 2015.

=== Presidential election, second round ===
Election	Winning candidate	Party	%	2nd place candidate	Party	%
2022	Emmanuel Macron	LREM	65.43	Marine Le Pen	FN	34.57
2017	Emmanuel Macron	LREM	72.18	Marine Le Pen	FN	27.82
2012	François Hollande	PS	53.43	Nicolas Sarkozy	UMP	46.57
2007	Nicolas Sarkozy	UMP	52.08	Ségolène Royal	PS	47.92
2002	Jacques Chirac	RPR	84.96	Jean-Marie Le Pen	FN	15.04
1995	Jacques Chirac	RPR	53.30	Lionel Jospin	PS	15.04

=== Members of the National Assembly ===
Constituency	Member	Party
Essonne's 1st constituency	Farida Amrani	La France Insoumise
Essonne's 2nd constituency	Nathalie da Conceicao Carvalho	National Rally
Essonne's 3rd constituency	Steevy Gustave	The Ecologists
Essonne's 4th constituency	Marie-Pierre Rixain	Renaissance
Essonne's 5th constituency	Paul Midy	Renaissance
Essonne's 6th constituency	Jérôme Guedj	Socialist Party
Essonne's 7th constituency	Claire Lejeune	La France Insoumise
Essonne's 8th constituency	Bérenger Cernon	La France Insoumise
Essonne's 9th constituency	Julie Ozenne	The Ecologists
Essonne's 10th constituency	Antoine Léaument	La France Insoumise

== Demographics ==
Population development since 1876:

Historical population

Year	Pop.	±% p.a.
1876	135,911	—
1881	140,027	+0.60%
1891	151,726	+0.81%
1901	164,617	+0.82%
1911	177,385	+0.75%
1921	187,188	+0.54%
1931	271,094	+3.77%
1936	286,896	+1.14%
1946	293,932	+0.24%
1954	350,987	+2.24%

Year	Pop.	±% p.a.
1962	478,691	+3.96%
1968	673,325	+5.85%
1975	923,063	+4.61%
1982	988,000	+0.98%
1990	1,084,824	+1.18%
1999	1,134,238	+0.50%
2007	1,201,994	+0.73%
2012	1,237,507	+0.58%
2017	1,296,130	+0.93%
2023	1,338,485	+0.54%

=== Place of birth of residents ===
Place of birth of residents of Essonne in 1999
Born in metropolitan France	Born outside metropolitan France			
84.7%	15.3%			
84.7%	Born in overseas France	Born in foreign countries with French citizenship at birth^{1}	EU-15 immigrants^{2}	Non-EU-15 immigrants
84.7%	1.8%	2.8%	4.0%	6.7%
^{1} This group is made up largely of former French settlers, such as pieds-noirs in Northwest Africa, followed by former colonial citizens who had French citizenship at birth (such as was often the case for the native elite in French colonies), as well as to a lesser extent foreign-born children of French expatriates. A foreign country is understood as a country not part of France in 1999, so a person born for example in 1950 in Algeria, when Algeria was an integral part of France, is nonetheless listed as a person born in a foreign country in French statistics.^{2} An immigrant is a person born in a foreign country not having French citizenship at birth. An immigrant may have acquired French citizenship since moving to France, but is still considered an immigrant in French statistics. On the other hand, persons born in France with foreign citizenship (the children of immigrants) are not listed as immigrants.

== Tourism ==
Tourist attractions

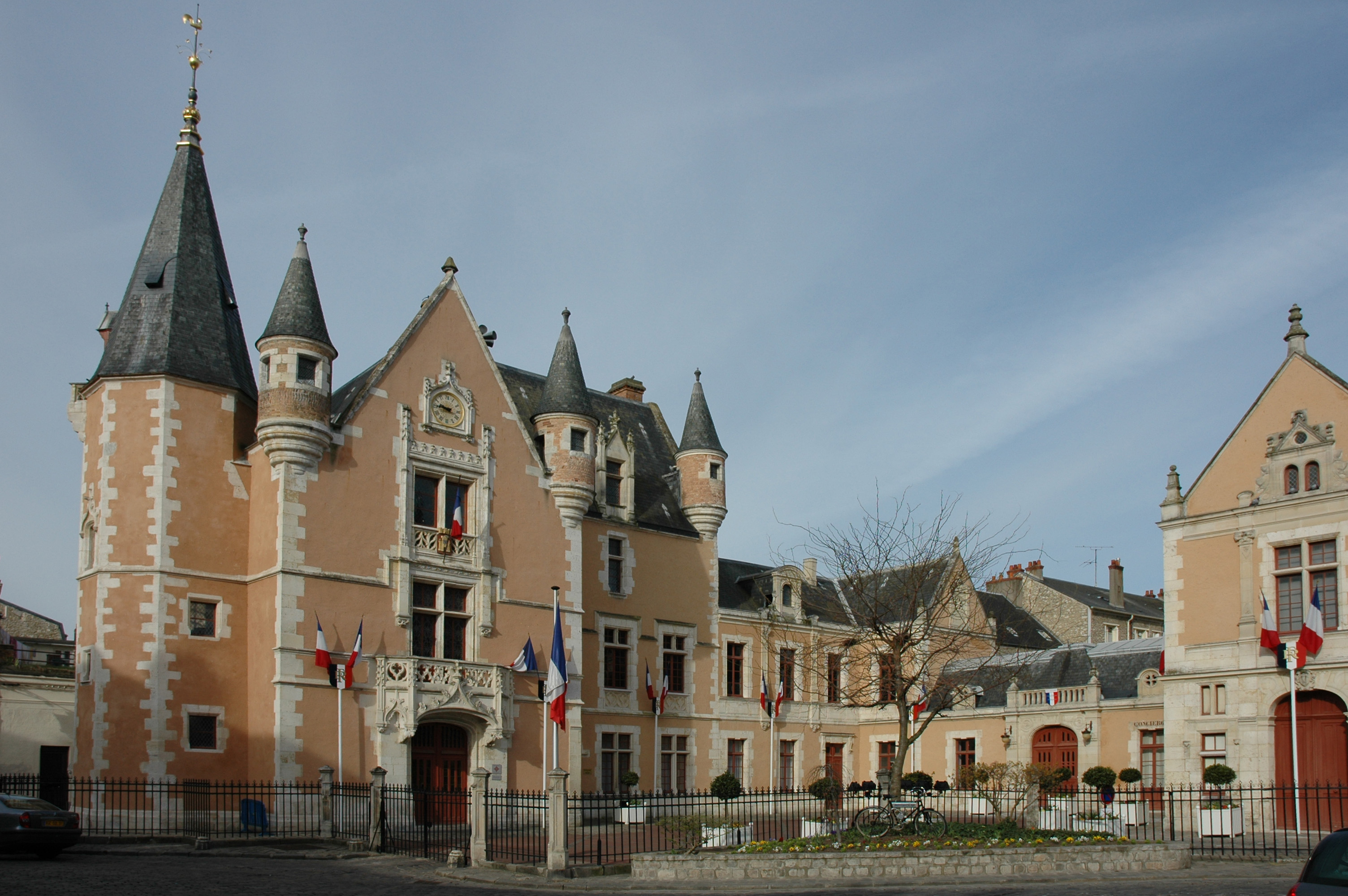
Étampes

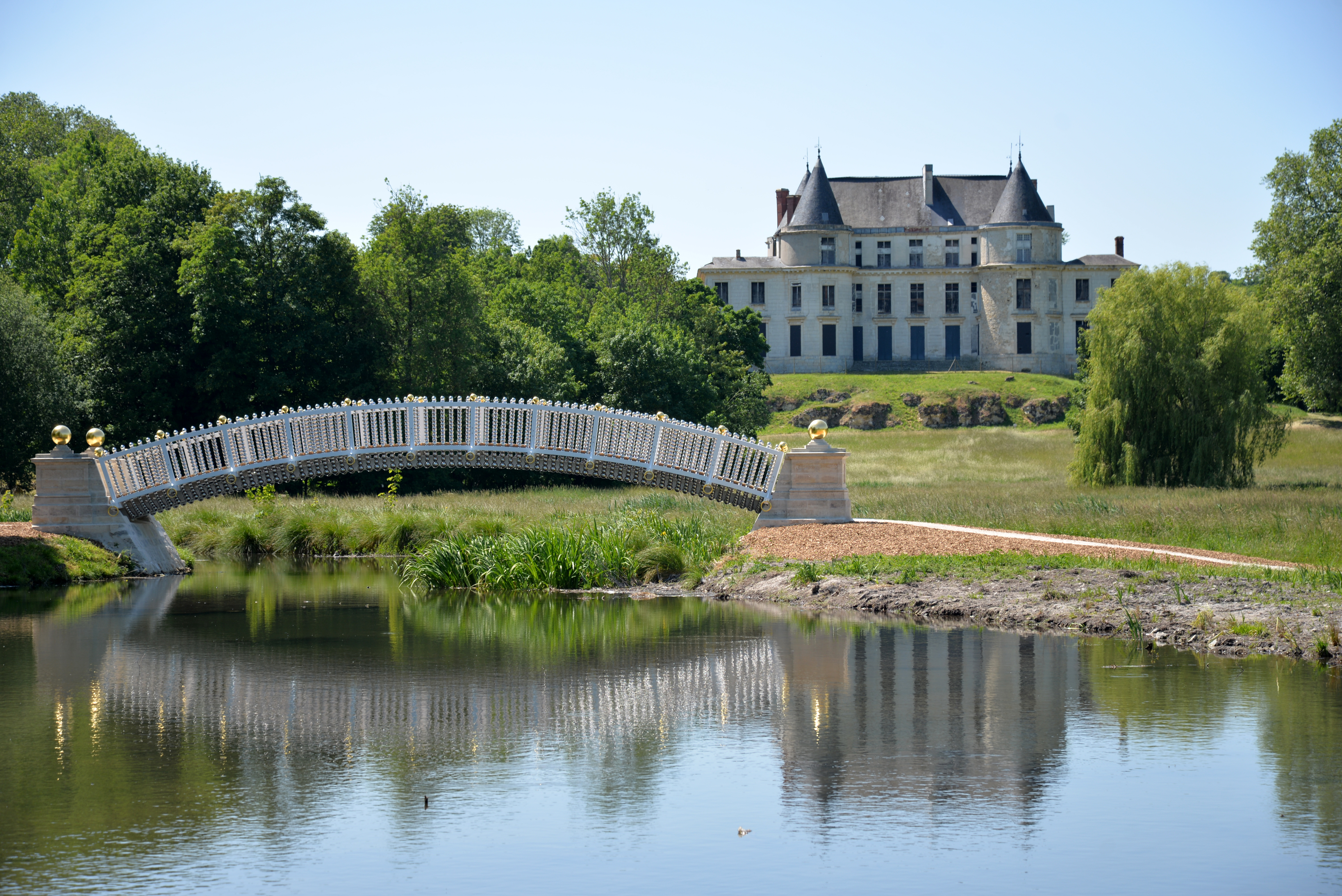
Méréville

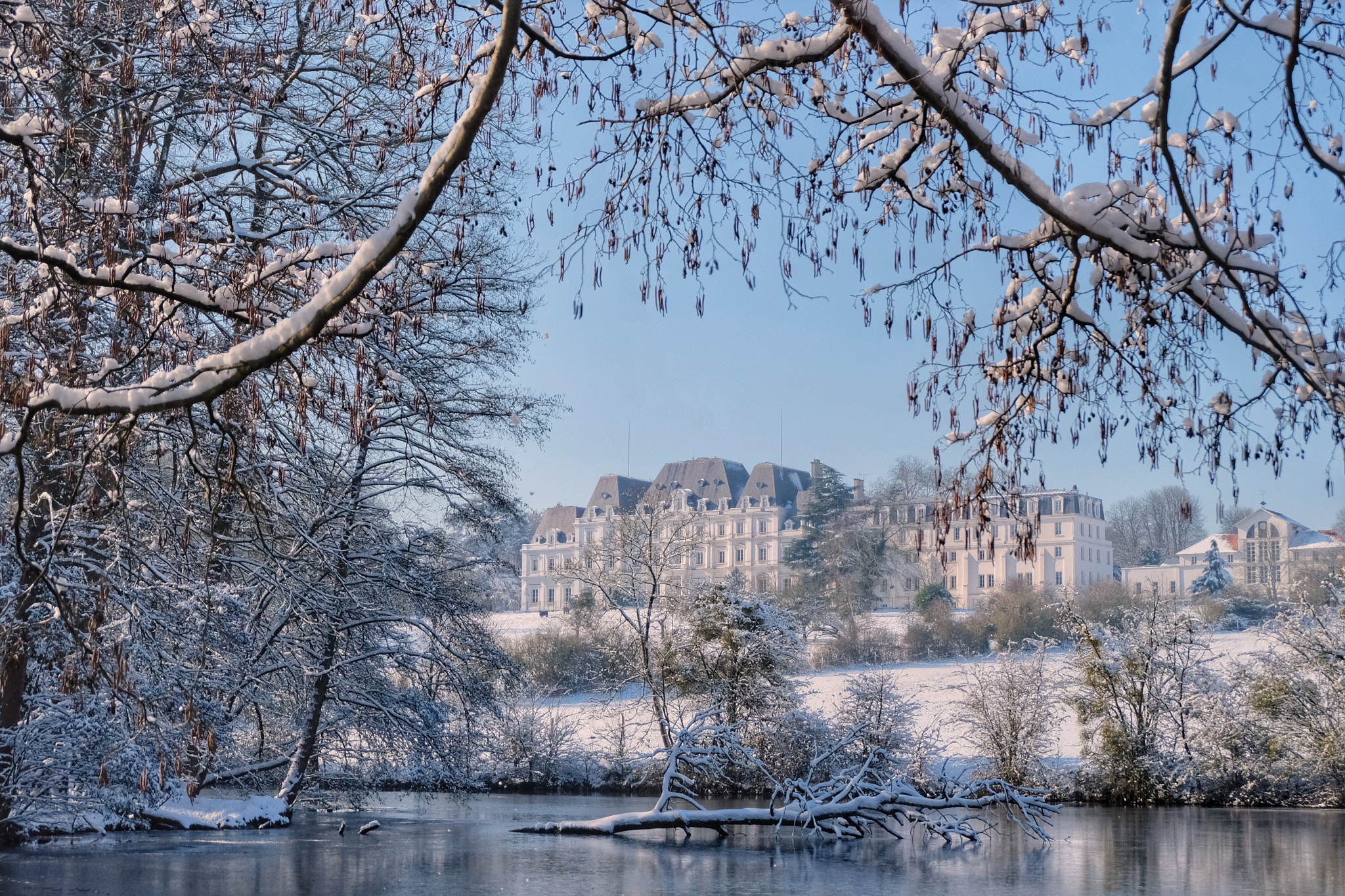
Longpont-sur-Orge

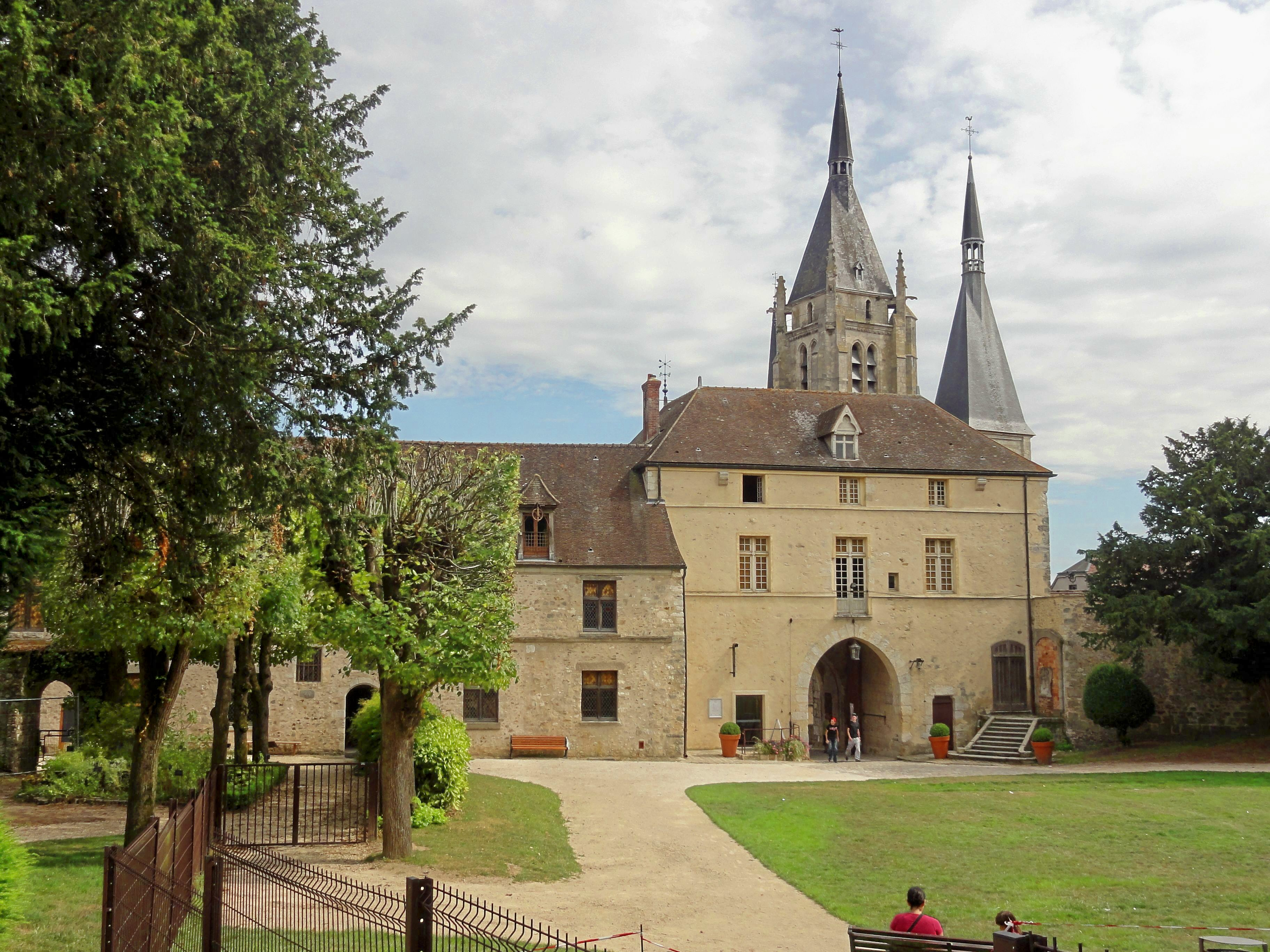
Château de Dourdan

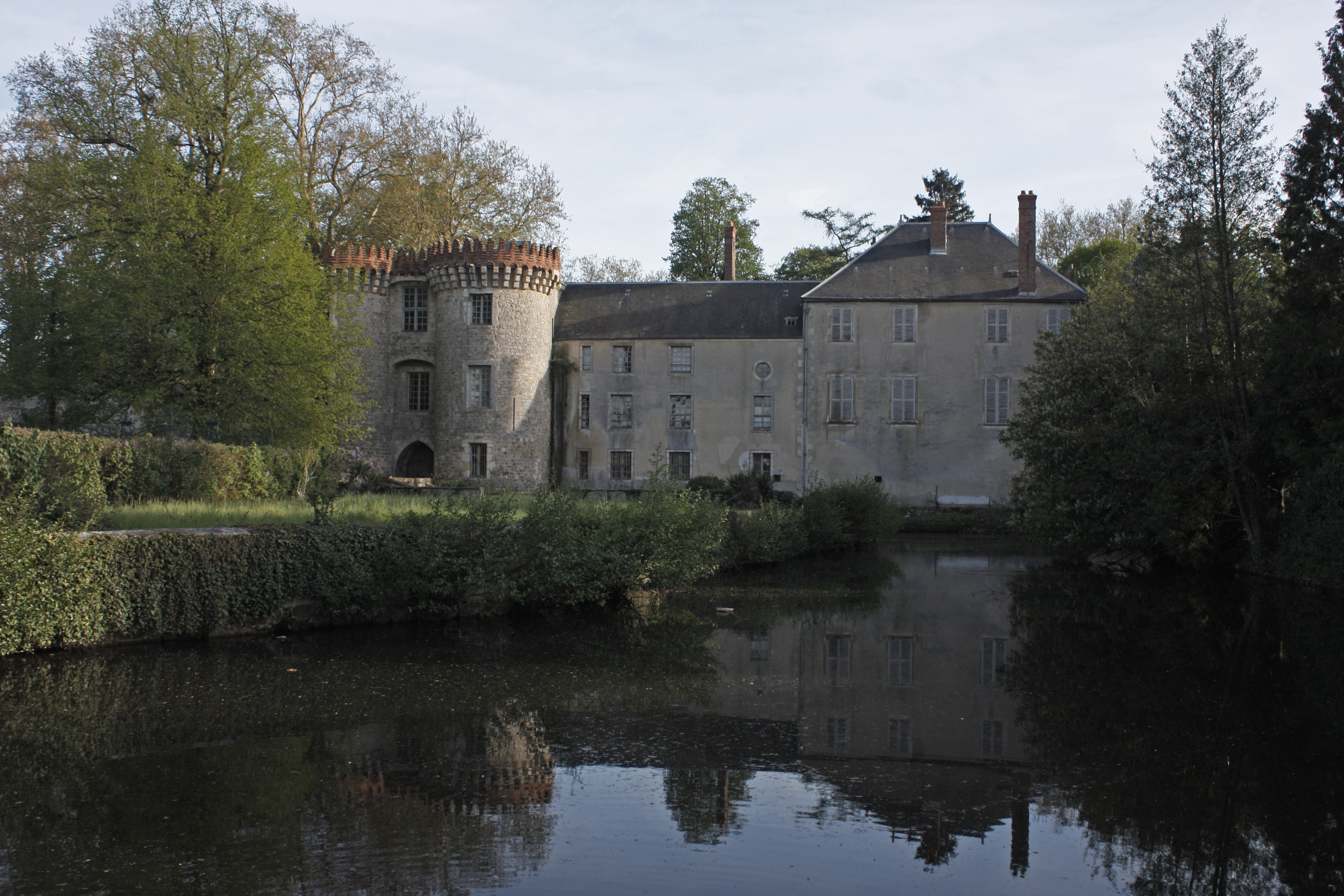
Milly La Forêt

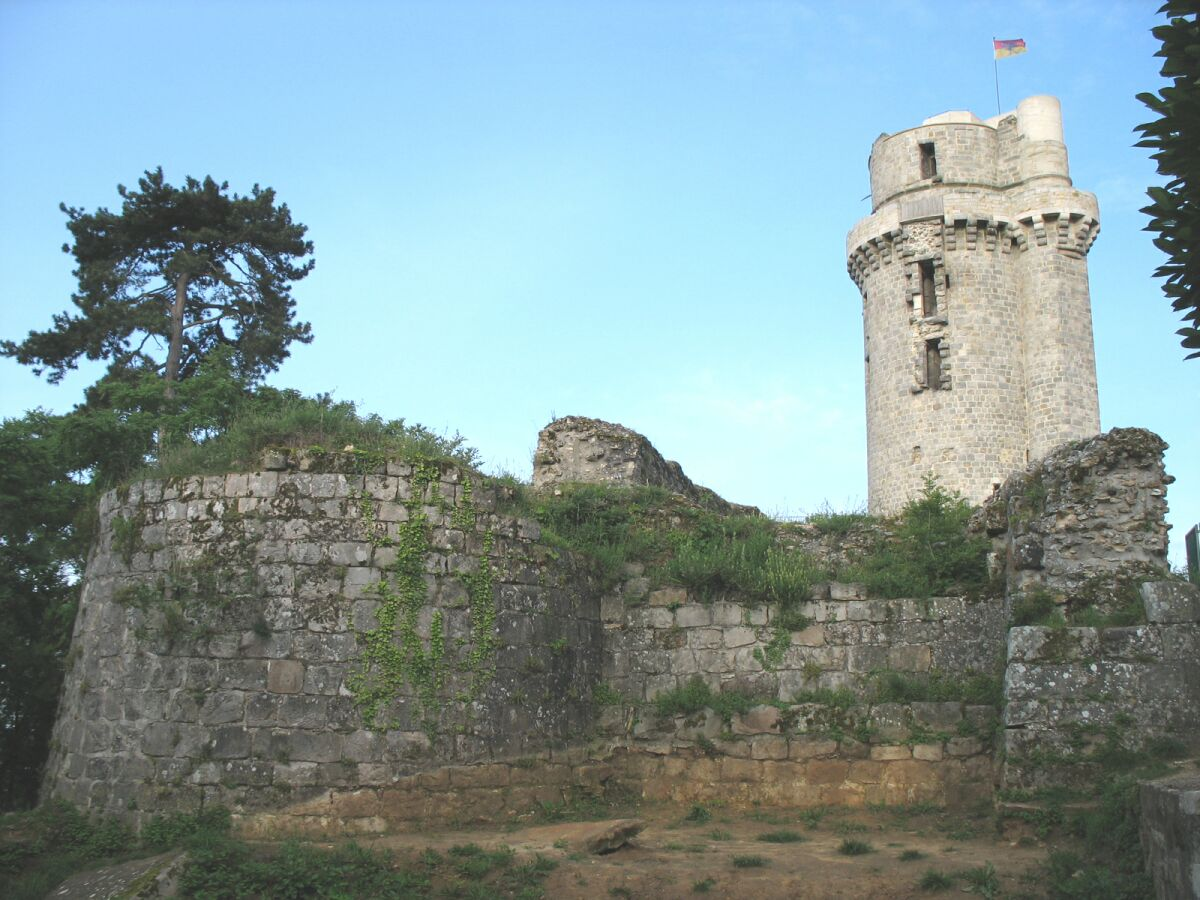
Château de Montlhéry

== Sister regions ==
Essonne is twinned with:

- Ibaraki Prefecture, Japan (since 1986)

== See also ==
- Cantons of the Essonne department
- Communes of the Essonne department
- Arrondissements of the Essonne department
