= 2004 Union for a Popular Movement leadership election =

← 2002	28 November 2004	2012 →
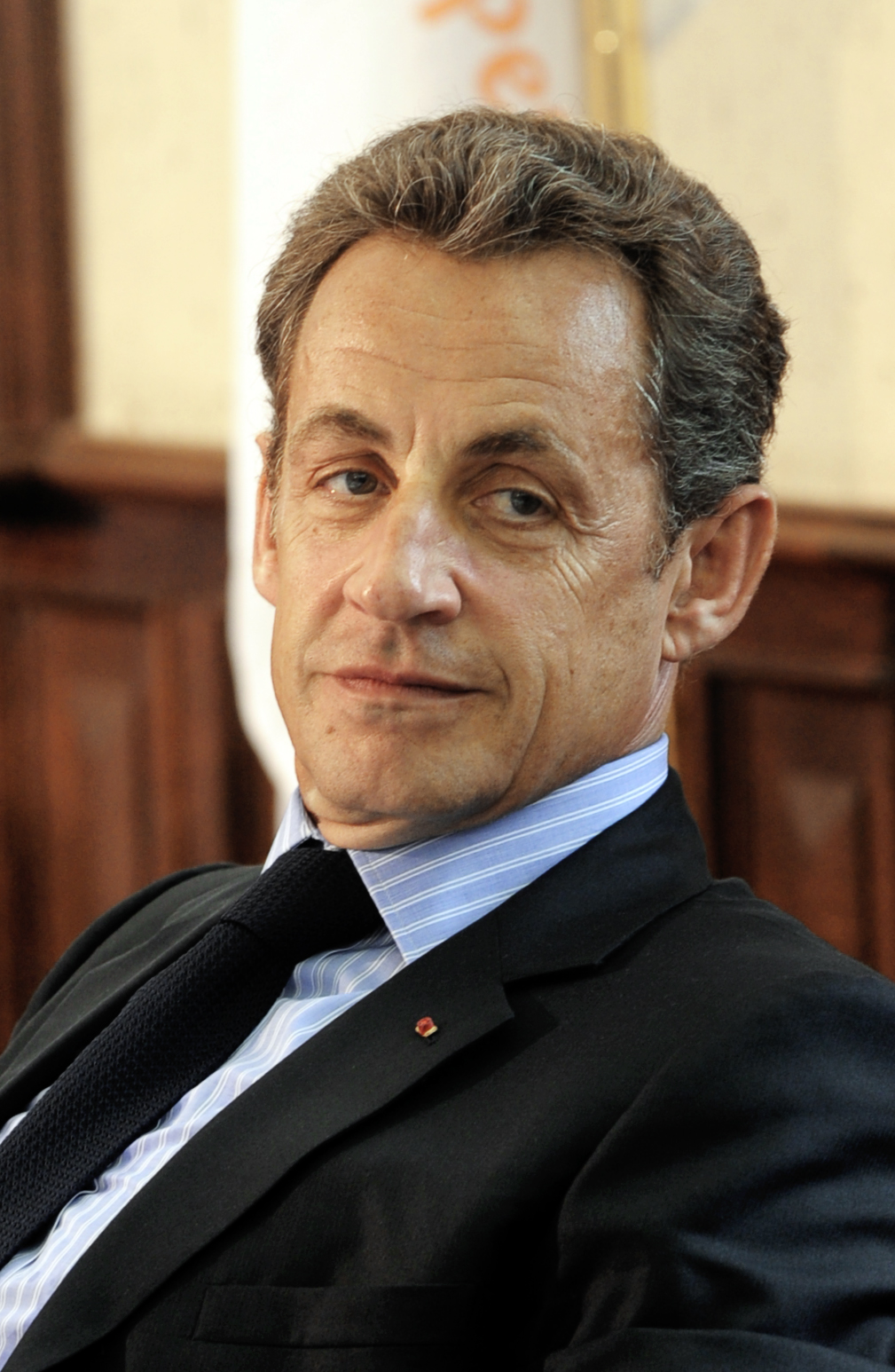

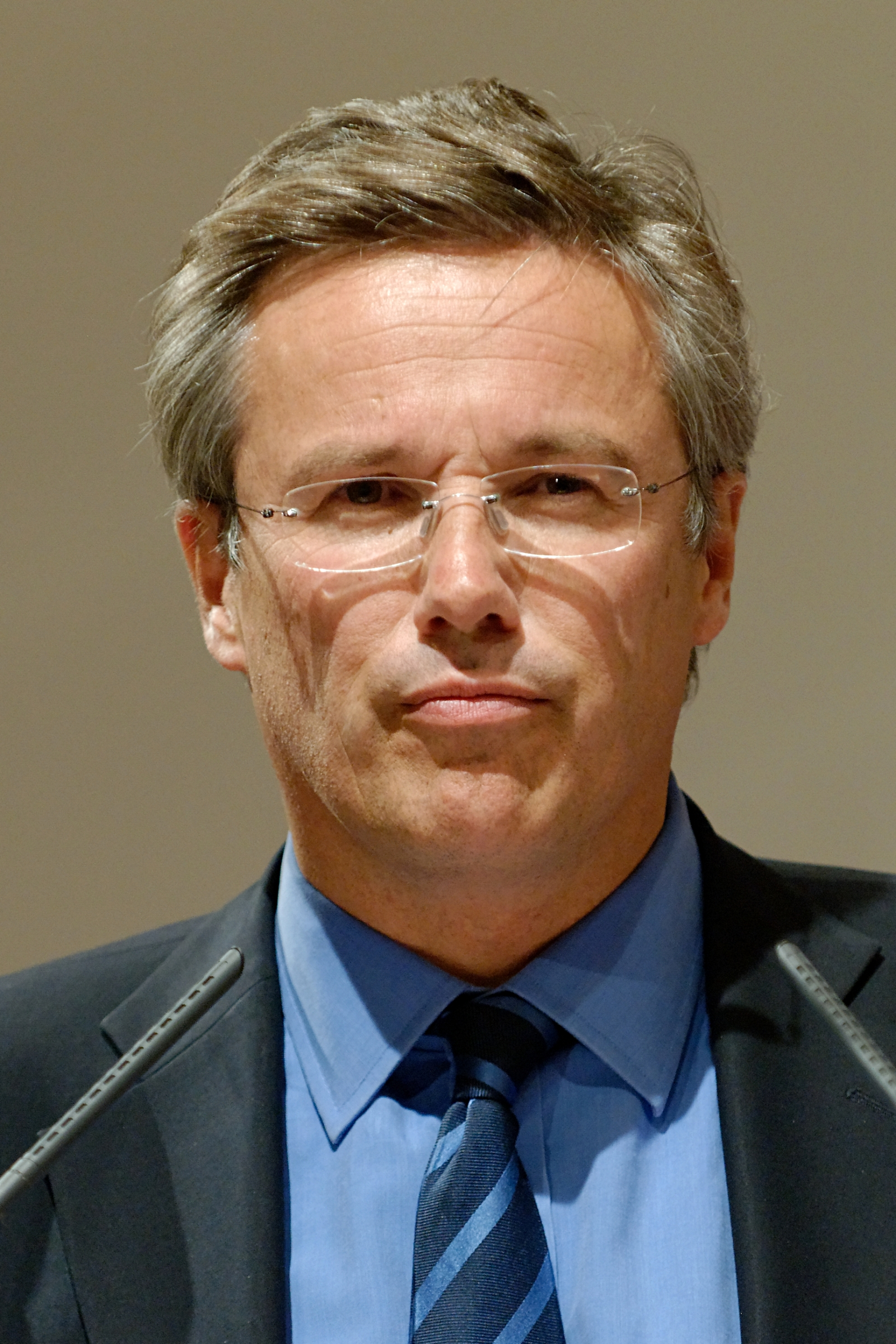

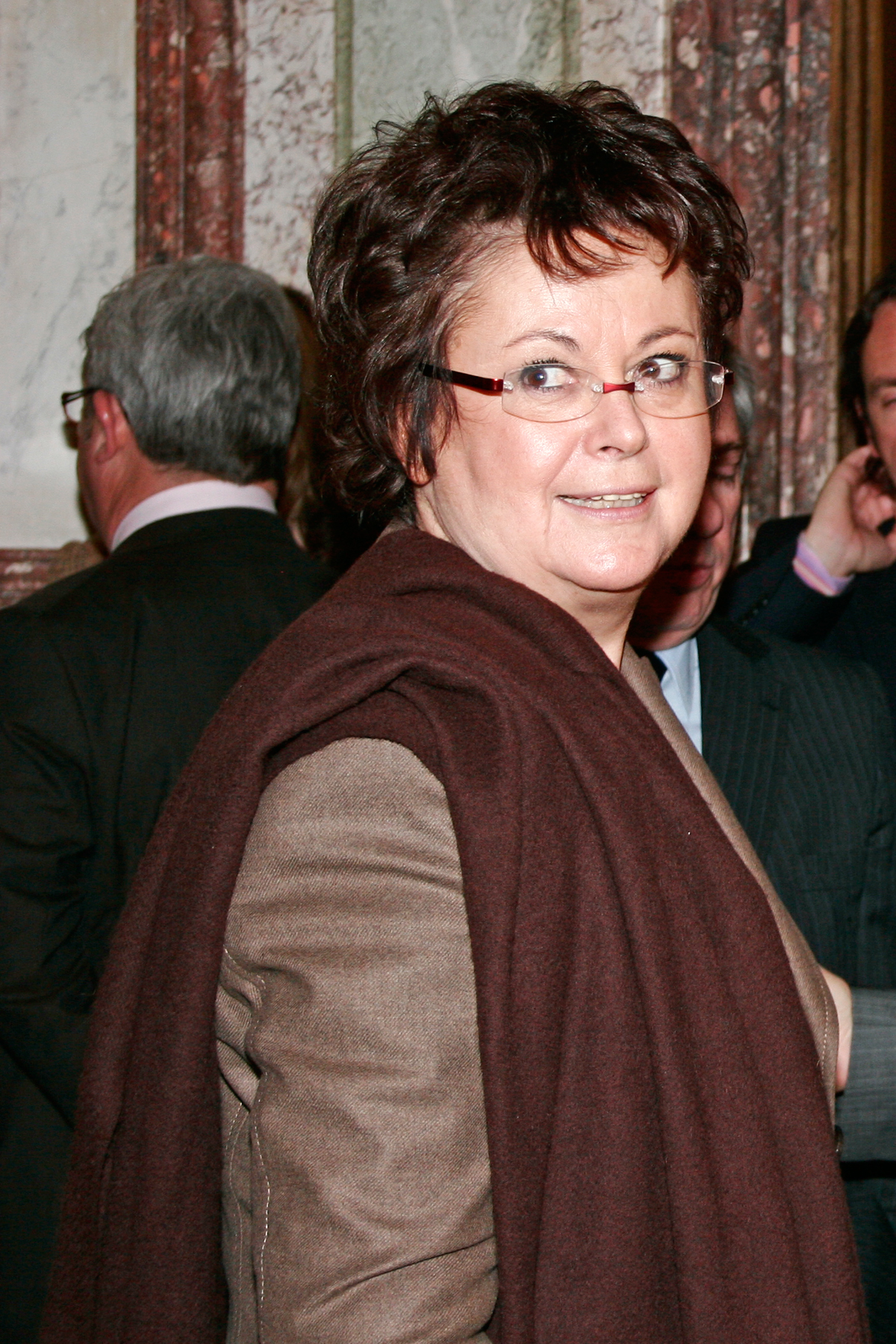
Candidate	Nicolas Sarkozy	Nicolas Dupont-Aignan	Christine Boutin
Party	UMP	DLR	UMP
Popular vote	60,266	6,443	4,121
Percentage	85.09%	9.10%	5.82%
President before election
Alain Juppé
Elected President
Nicolas Sarkozy

The 2004 Union for a Popular Movement leadership election was held on November 28, 2004 to elect the leadership of the French Union for a Popular Movement (Union pour un mouvement populaire, UMP). The congress was organized after the UMP's first president, Alain Juppé, was forced to resign from the party's presidency following his conviction in a corruption scandal.

Nicolas Sarkozy, the finance minister and main intraparty rival of incumbent President Jacques Chirac easily won the UMP's presidency and thereafter focused the party machinery on his candidacy in the 2007 presidential election.

== Presidential candidates ==
Candidates seeking to run for the party presidency needed to win the endorsements of at least 3% of party members. Each candidate created a "ticket" with two other party members for the offices of vice-president and secretary-general of the UMP.

- Nicolas Sarkozy: Minister of the Economy, Finances and Industry; mayor of Neuilly-sur-Seine (ex-RPR)
  - Candidate for vice president: Jean-Claude Gaudin, mayor of Marseille and Senator for the Bouches-du-Rhône (ex-DL)
  - Candidate for secretary-general: Pierre Méhaignerie, mayor of Vitré and deputy of the Ille-et-Vilaine's 5th constituency (ex-UDF)
- Nicolas Dupont-Aignan: mayor of Yerres and deputy for the Essonne's 8th constituency; leader of Arise the Republic (DLR) (ex-RPR)
  - Candidate for vice president: Élisabeth Laithier (ex-RPR)
  - Candidate for secretary-general: Rachid Kaci, founder of The Free Right (ex-DL)
- Christine Boutin: deputy for the Yvelines' 10th constituency, leader of the Forum of Social Republicans (FRS) (ex-UDF)
  - Candidate for vice president: Jean-Bernard Milliard (ex-DL)
  - Candidate for secretary-general: Vincent You (ex-RPR)

== Results ==
UMP leadership election results
Party	Candidate	Votes	%
UMP	Nicolas Sarkozy / Jean-Claude Gaudin and Pierre Méhaignerie	60 266	85.09
DLR	Nicolas Dupont-Aignan / Élisabeth Laithier and Rachid Kaci	6 443	9.10
UMP	Christine Boutin / Jean-Bernard Milliard and Vincent You	4 121	5.82
