= Center of Political and Foreign Affairs =

Think tank focused on government policies and geopolitics

Agency overview
- Formed: 2007
- Headquarters: Paris, France.
- Agency executive: Fabien Baussart, President
- Website: http://thecpfa.com/

The Center of Political and Foreign Affairs (abb: CPFA) is a think tank focused on government policies and geopolitics, organizes events and discussions on various geopolitical topics around the world

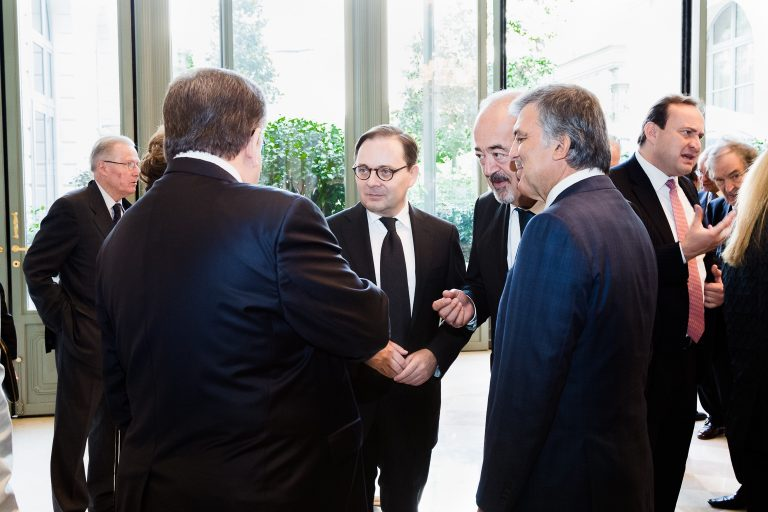
Fabien Baussart, CPFA Chairman with former Turkish President, Abdullah Gül.

CPFA has organized numerous events under Chatham House rules and has hosted over a hundred personalities such as: Zbigniew Brzezinski, Kofi Annan, Henry Kissinger, Al Gore, Abdullah Gül, José María Aznar, Sebastián Piñera, Romano Prodi, Brent Scowcroft, Richard Holbrooke, Shimon Peres, Mohamed ElBaradei, Louis Freeh, Turki Al-Faisal since 2007. CPFA has also initiated with the collaboration of Randa Kassis the President of the Astana Platform for peace talks in Syria as well as many other confidential talks on the topics on Syria and Libya.

== Initiatives ==
=== Peace in Syria Initiative ===
In 2015 CPFA appealed to the President of Kazakhstan, Nursultan Nazarbayev to launch a peaceful solution to the Syrian crisis and launched a political platform that could assemble moderate Syrian opponents.

The first round of negotiations in Astana was held from 25 to 27 May and chaired by the Kazakh Foreign Minister Erlan Idrissov. The second round of negotiations in Astana from 2 to 4 October 2015 headed by the Secretary of State of Kazakhstan Gulshara Abdykalikova and mediated by Fabien Baussart and the Kazakh Deputy Foreign Minister Askar Mussinov. The meetings resulted in two resolutions being signed by the participants, which created the Astana Platform and helped pave the way for the Astana process with an agreement between Iran, Russia, and Turkey.

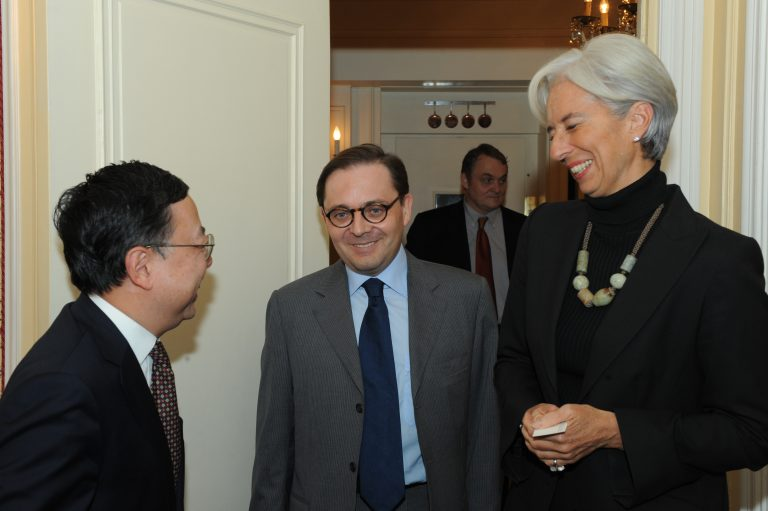
Fabien Baussart, CPFA Chairman with Christine Lagarde, General Director of IMF

In February and July 2017, the CPFA initiated discussions in Geneva with Randa Kassis to develop a preparatory document to reform the Syrian Constitution. This initiative was promoted during the Syrian National Dialogue Congress in Sochi in January 2018 by Randa Kassis despite objections from the Syrian government and part of the opposition.

=== Peace talks – Kazakhstan ===
In 2015, CPFA launched a "Committee of Wise" that would address various issues related to international peace.

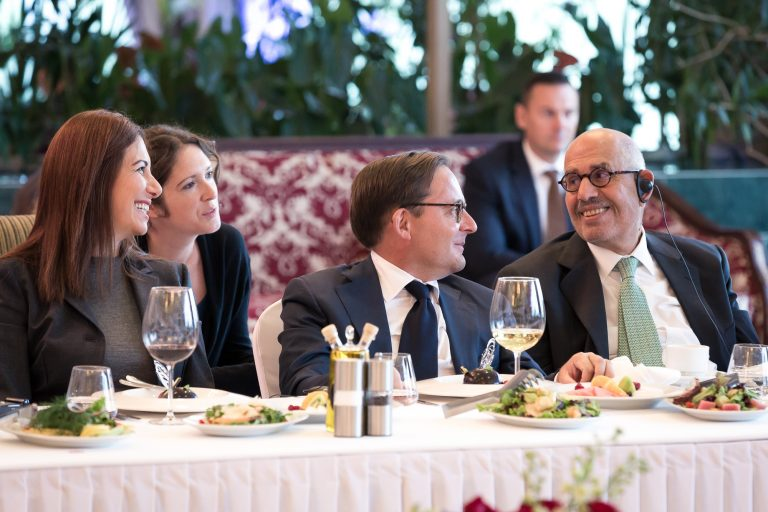
Fabien Baussart, CPFA Chairman with Mohamed El Baradai, former Director General of the IAEA and Randa Kassis.

The committee gathered several prominent political figures and Nobel Peace Prize laureates, including former Israeli President Shimon Peres, former Vice President of Egypt and the general-director of the International Atomic Energy Agency Mohamed ElBaradei, former President of Poland Lech Wałęsa, Guatemalan human rights activist Rigoberta Menchú and the Chairman of the IPCC Rajendra Pachauri, former President of Colombia Cesar Gaviria and former Spanish Prime Minister Jose Luis Zapatero. The Committee met in Nur Sultan, Kazakhstan, where they were received by the President Nazarbayev in the Presidential Palace.

=== Nuclear Non-Proliferation Initiative ===
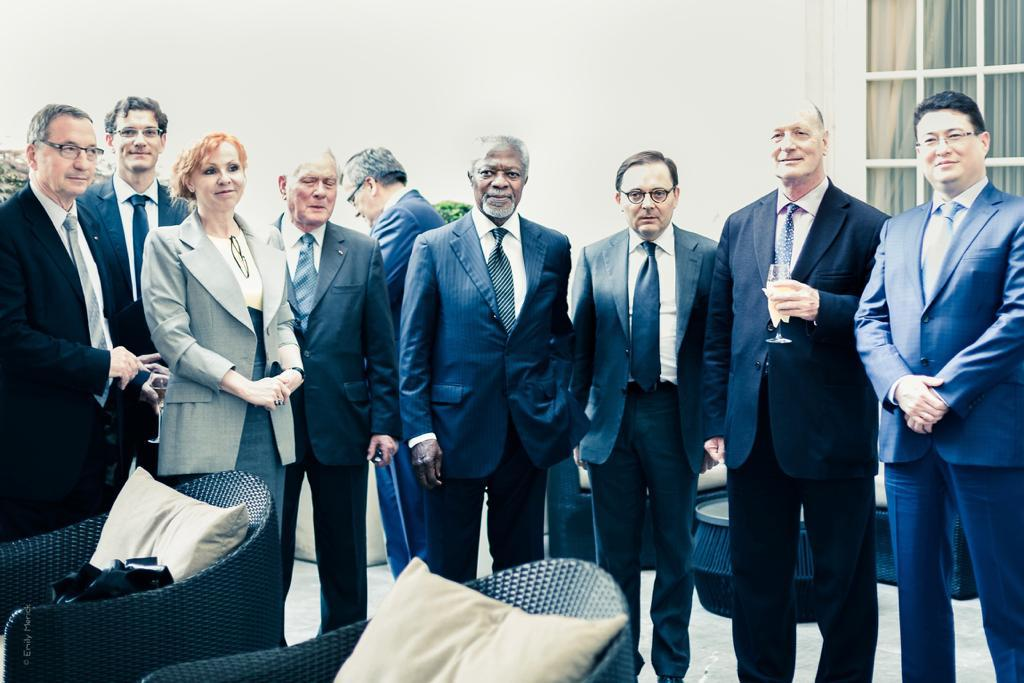
Fabian Baussart, Head of the CPFA, along with Kofi Annan, Nobel Peace Prize Winner

In 2016, the CPFA organised a conference on nuclear non-proliferation chaired by former UN Secretary-General Kofi Annan in the presence of Bronisław Komorowski, Jack Straw, Yaşar Yakış and Giulio Terzi.
