= Alexandre del Valle =

French essayist

- Born: Marc d'Anna; September 4, 1968 (age 57); Perpignan, France
- Education: Institute of Political Studies, Paris; Institute of Political Studies, Aix-en-Provence
- Occupation: Writer Geopolitics
- Political party: Union for a Popular Movement (2002-2012); Rally for the Republic (Formerly)
- Website: AlexandredelValle.com

Marc d'Anna (born 4 September 1968), writing under the pen name Alexandre del Valle, is a Franco-Italian geopolitologist, writer, professor, columnist, and political commentator.

Del Valle specializes in geopolitics. He is known primarily for his analysis of Islamic extremism, and his criticism of Recep Tayyip Erdoğan's policies. Del Valle is a proponent of the PanWest paradigm, which is the cooperation between the West and Russia against radical Islamism. He coined the term "red–green–brown alliance" in 2002.

Del Valle focuses on Islamic extremism, geopolitical threats, civilizational conflicts, and terrorism, as well as Mediterranean issues such as Turkey's proposed accession to the European Union. Del Valle wrote on international relations and geopolitics of the Arab-Muslim world.

== Early life ==
Del Valle was born in Marseille, France, on September 6, 1968, to Pieds-Noirs parents. His father was a Sicilian who settled first in Tunisia, and later in Algeria and Marseille (Southern France). His mother came from a Spaniard family partly settled in Oran, Algeria, and later in Marseille. He was orphaned at age 4, and spent most of his childhood in a foster home where he grew up in a multicultural environment.

In 1993, he graduated from the Institute of Political Studies, Aix-en-Provence, where he obtained a DEA (Master of Advanced Studies) in military history, security and defense. He took interest in political science and geopolitical analysis when he joined Sciences Po Paris, where he prepared for the ENA exam.

In 2015, he obtained a DEA (Master of Advanced Studies) from the University of Milan in the history of political doctrines and institutions. He earned a Ph.D. in contemporary history, from the Paul Valéry University Montpellier 3.

== Career ==
Marc d'Anna joined the General Secretariat of National Defense (SGDSN) in 1997. He underwent a security investigation, after which he was granted secret-defense clearance. He worked as an editor-analyst at the Facts and Trends Letter of the International and Strategic Affairs section. He worked in the territorial and international civil service before founding his consulting firm in Brussels.

He is a teacher in geopolitics at Sup de Co La Rochelle and at IPAG and works at the European University of Rome and at the International Institute of Geopolitics. He was an associate researcher at the Institut Choiseul until 2014, and co-founder of the Mediterranean Geopolitical Observatory (based in Cyprus).

He was a columnist for Nouvelle Liberté (Marseille), La Une, Le Figaro Magazine, Le Figaro, Le Spectacle du Monde, Israel Magazine, Liberal (Italy), France-Soir, and Atlantico. He writes regularly for Atlantico, Le Figaro and Valeurs Actuelles.

He collaborated on geopolitical reviews, Herodotus, Strategic, Geostrategic, Nova Storica, Risk, International Policy, Outre-Terre, Daedalos Papers, Geopolitical Affairs, and Geoeconomics. He focuses on the geopolitics of the Arab-Muslim world.

He is a member of various think tanks, including the Daedalos Institute of Geopolitics. He is a director of the consultancy firm and think tank Géopol Consultings.

In December 2019, Del Valle was consulted, along with Emmanuel Razavi of GlobalGeoNews, on radical Islamism, by French Senate Vice President Nathalie Delattre, as a geopolitologist, consultant, and essayist, for the Commission of Inquiry on Islamist Radicalization and the Means of Combating It.

In 2022, in his preface to La mondialisation dangereuse, the geopolitologist and former president of La Sorbonne Jacques Soppelsa presented Del Valle as "a representative of the new generation of geopoliticians who have nothing to envy their American counterparts". He stated that he was deepening his analysis of globalization, too often understood as "non-frontier", in "an innovative and counter-intuitive logic that would surprise his readers and detractors".

=== Political background ===
In 1991, while studying at the IEP in Aix-en-Provence, Del Valle joined the RPR UDF and then the RPF of Charles Pasqua and Philippe de Villiers.

In 1999, he signed the petition "Europeans want peace", initiated by the collective "No to war" to oppose the military intervention of NATO in Serbia.

In 2001 he joined the UMP with Rachid Kaci.

In November 2002, he co-founded, with his friend Rachid Kaci, La Droite Libre, a liberal-conservative current, which is, according to Le Monde, "a current situated very much to the right within the UMP, and with positions that are resolutely pro-Israeli and not very Islamophile. On November 17, 2002, during the constituent assembly of the UMP, Rachid Kaci and he, under a pseudonym, ran for the vice-presidency of the UMP with, as opponents, Alain Juppé or Nicolas Dupont-Aignan.

In 2012 he participated in an international counter-jihad conference in Brussels, billed as the "International conference for free speech & human rights". In 2017, he participated in a conference organized by Salvo Pogliese MEP and his European People's Party group.

In 2019, he spoke at a conference organized by Costas Mavrides MEP, a member of the Progressive Alliance of Socialists and Democrats group.

== Controversies ==
Del Valle's first book, Islamism and the United States: An Alliance against Europe, sparked controversy in France and in the United States. In the book, Del Valle claimed the U.S. government was deliberately using Islam to destroy Europe. This theory was criticized by Bat Ye'or in the Middle East Quarterly published in September 1998. Although Ye'or reproached Del Valle for his hostility to the Clinton administration, she congratulated him for his attempt to "courageously expose the dangers of Islamism."

In another article published in the Middle East Quarterly in Spring 2000, French-American geopolitician Laurent Murawiec characterized Del Valle as hostile to Muslims and criticized his analysis of the United States' pro-Muslim strategy during the Cold War. In response, Del Valle wrote that "history and the tragedy of September 11 have proven me right." He claimed that Murawiec omitted to mention that his later books, such as Le Totalitarisme Islamiste a l'assaut des démocraties, were labeled both "pro-American and pro-Zionist."

Del Valle later wrote articles published in Le Figaro and Politique Internationale that called for a union to be formed with the United States and in which he denounced all forms of anti-Western and anti-American feelings. Murawiec wrote an essay that also deplored the present pro-Saudi and pro-Islamist strategy and political correctness of American presidents who never dared nominating Saudi Arabia and Wahhabism as the real enemy and supporters of radical Islam.

In 2002, Del Valle was criticized by far-right, left-wing and extreme-left magazines such as Le Monde Diplomatique and the pro-Palestinian and anti-Zionist MRAP. Some extreme-right movements, believing that Del Valle had been close to their visions in his early writings on Islamism and America, moved to denounce his Zionism and his close relations with the Jewish community.

In an article published in April 2002, French far-left organisation Ras L'front claimed that Del Valle had originally set out its arguments in far right-wing circles, especially during lectures at meetings of the ultra right or the New Right. Del Valle rejected the claims and brought the matter to the courts. These trials with peripeteias eventually resulted in a decision from the 11th Chamber of the Court of appeal of Paris in 2005, which dismissed Del Valle, who carried out an action for defamation against Ras L'front.

In two other trials, Del Valle and his lawyer, Gilles-William Goldnadel, the French President of "Droit à la Sécurité" and "France Israël association" (who also was Oriana Fallaci's lawyer in France), won two other cases: one in 2006 against MRAP, an anti-racist organization led by French communist Mouloud Aounit, and a second against Canal+ (TV Channel), in 2007 (17th court of Paris). The 17th court of Paris dismissed MRAP, who had published in 2003 a special report on anti-Arabs, Zionists and Far right networks in France. This MRAP Report accused Del Valle and other intellectuals such as Guy Millière, Michel Darmon (former France-Israel's President) or Gilles-William Goldnadel as islamophobes and for supporting Zionist organizations such as the Union of French Jewish Employers and Professionals, Likoud, KKL, or Bnai Brith. The 17th Court of Appeal decided that MRAP did not have the right to accuse Del Valle of islamophobia and was dismissed after having tried to have Del Valle and Guy Millière condemned for defamation.

Del Valle acknowledges that he made errors making speeches with controversial intellectuals in the context of the presentations of his books. But he claimed that his political "godfathers" were Gaullists and former popular dissidents such as Alain Griotteray, Pierre Marie Gallois, the former nuclear and geopolitical adviser of Charles De Gaulle, Gabriel Kaspereit and Jean Matteoli.

== Bibliography ==
- Islamisme et États-Unis, une alliance contre l'Europe, L'Age d'Homme, Lausanne, 1997, ISBN 2-8251-1060-4
- Guerres contre l'Europe, Bosnie, Kosovo, Techétchénie, Syrtes, 2000
- Le Totalitarisme islamiste à l'assaut des démocraties, Syrtes, 2002
- La Turquie dans l'Europe, un cheval de Troie islamiste?, Syrtes, 2004
- Le Dilemme Turc, les vrais enjeux de la candidature d'Ankara, Syrtes, 2006
- Perchè la Turchia non-deve entrare nell'Europa, Guerini, May 2009, Torino, Italy
- A Islamizaçao de Europa, A civilisaçao edit, Lisboa, Portugal, June 2009
- I Rossi Neri, Verdi: la convergenza degli Estremi opposti. Islamismo, comunismo, neonazismo, Lindau, 2010
- Pourquoi on tue les chrétiens dans le monde aujourd'hui, la nouvelle islamophobie (The New Christianophobia, Why Have Christians Around the World Become Murder Targets?); Maxima, Paris, 2011, (soon published in the USA)
- Le complexe occidental, Petit traité de déculpabilisation, Editions du Toucan, Paris, 2014.
- Le Chaos syrien, Minorités et printemps arabes face à l'islamisme, [written with Randa Kassis a Syrian politician and writer]; Dows éditions, Paris, 2014.
- Les vrais ennemis de l'Occident, du rejet de la Russie à l'islamisation des sociétés ouvertes, Editions du Toucan/ L'Artilleur, Paris, 2016 (The real enemies of the West, from the reject of Russia to the islamization of the open societies").
- La strategie de l'intimidation, du terrorisme jihadiste à l'islamiquement correct, Editions du Toucan/L'Artilleur, Paris, 2018 (The Strategy of Intimidation, from the jihadist terrorism to the "islamically correctness".
- Le Projet: La stratégie de conquête et d'infiltration des frères musulmans en France et dans le monde (The Project: The strategy of conquest and infiltration of the Muslim brothers in France and in the world), Written with Emmanuel Razavi, L'artilleur, 2019, 560 p.
- La mondialisation dangereuse : Vers le déclassement de l'occident (Dangerous globalization: Towards the decline of the West), Written with Jacques Soppelsa, Paris, L'Artilleur, 2021, 520 p.

== See also ==
- Persecution of Christians
- Union for a Popular Movement
- The Free Right
- Randa Kassis
