= Fabien Baussart =

President of Center of Political and Foreign Affairs (CPFA)

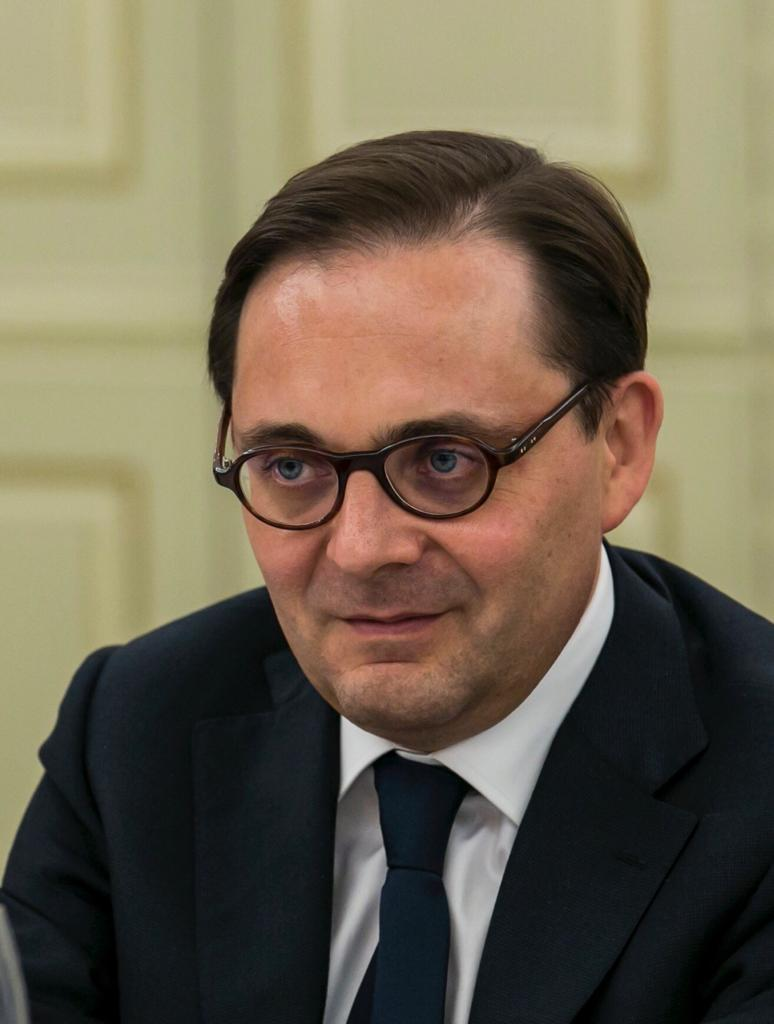
- Born: 25 January 1973 (age 53); Paris, France
- Occupations: President of the center of political and foreign affairs
- Website: thecpfa.com

Fabien Baussart (25 January 1973) is a French businessman. He is the founder and chairman of the 2006 established think tank Center of Political and Foreign Affairs (CPFA), which organizes events and discussions on various geopolitical topics around the world with prominent political figures such as Zbigniew Brzezinski, Kofi Annan, José María Aznar, Mohamed ElBaradei, and Al Gore. Le Monde described Baussart as an intermediary with close ties to the government of Russia. During the Syrian civil war, he and his Syrian-born wife, Randa Kassis, coordinated diplomatic initiatives aimed at finding a solution to the conflict that would be acceptable to the Kremlin.

== Biography ==
Baussart is a businessman who has invested in Russia, Ukraine and Kazakhstan. In 2005 he founded Xorus Press Inc.' which published the French and Russian editions of Foreign Policy and invested in various media outlets in Ukraine, Russia and France. In 2010, Baussart sponsored a new art magazine entitled Le Monde de l'Art, which launched in Paris and was directed by the writer Guillaume de Sardes. He also sponsored the KitSon Club, a French think tank.

Fabien Baussart worked on solving various political crises, focusing particularly on Libya and Syria, by facilitating peace talks between different protagonists.

In 2015, as president of CPFA, he initiated peace talks on Syria in Astana with Randa Kassis by appealing to the first Kazakhstan president Nursultan Nazarbayev.

== Political initiatives ==
=== Peace in Syria ===
In 2015 Baussart and Randa Kassis appealed to the President of Kazakhstan, Nursultan Nazarbayev to launch a peaceful solution to the crisis and launch a political platform that could assemble moderate Syrian opponents.

Two first meeting was chaired by the Kazakh Foreign Minister Erlan Idrissov in May 2015. The second meeting was opened by the Secretary of State of Kazakhstan Gulshara Abdykalikova and mediated by Fabien Baussart and the Kazakh Deputy Foreign Minister Askar Mussinov. The meetings resulted in two resolutions being signed by the participants, which created the Astana Platform and helped pave the way for the peace process in Astana.

In February and July 2017 Baussart and Kassis initiated discussions in Geneva to develop a preparatory document to reform the Syrian Constitution. This initiative was promoted during the National Conference in Sochi in January 2018 by Randa Kassis despite objections from the Syrian government and part of the opposition.

=== Peace talks – Kazakhstan ===
In 2015, Fabien Baussart launched a "Committee of the Wise" that would address various issues related to international peace.

The committee gathered several prominent political figures and Nobel Peace Prize laureates, including former Israeli President Shimon Peres, former Vice President of Egypt and general-director of the International Atomic Energy Agency Mohamed ElBaradei, former President of Poland Lech Walesa, Guatemalan human rights activist Rigoberta Menchu Tom and Chairman of the IPCC Rajendra Pachauri, former President of Colombia Cesar Gaviria and former Spanish Prime Minister Jose Luis Zapatero. The Committee met in Nur Sultan, Kazakhstan, where they were received by President Nazarbayev in the Presidential Palace.

=== Nuclear Non – Proliferation Initiative ===
In 2016 Baussart organised a conference on nuclear non-proliferation with guest speakers Kofi Annan, Bronislaw Komorowski, Jack Straw, Yasar Yakis and Giulio Terzi.

== Controversy ==
In 2010, Fabien Baussart, a close friend of Thaksin Shinawatra, stood by him to oppose a potential expulsion from France. At the time, Shinawatra was facing political harassment led by Bernard Kouchner, the French Minister of Foreign Affairs.

In December 2016, Baussart through his CPFA nominated Vladimir Putin for the Nobel Peace Prize. Baussart stated, "I believe that President Putin has deserved it, who is truly fighting terrorism and especially against ISIS in Palmyra, Syria."

== Personal ==
Baussart is married to Syrian-born Randa Kassis who is a close friend of Sergey Lavrov. Following a speech by Donald Trump Jr., for the CPFA in the Louis XV Salon at the in Hotel Ritz Paris on 11 October 2016, Kassis allegedly flew to Moscow and stated that she could serve as a back door communication link between the Trump presidency and Vladimir Putin regarding the political process in Syria .

== See also ==
- Mueller special counsel investigation
