= 2002 Union for a Popular Movement leadership election =

- 17 November 2002
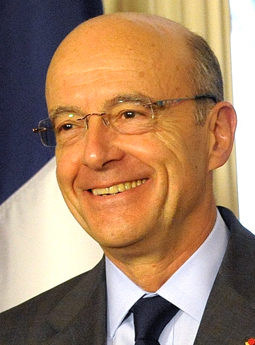

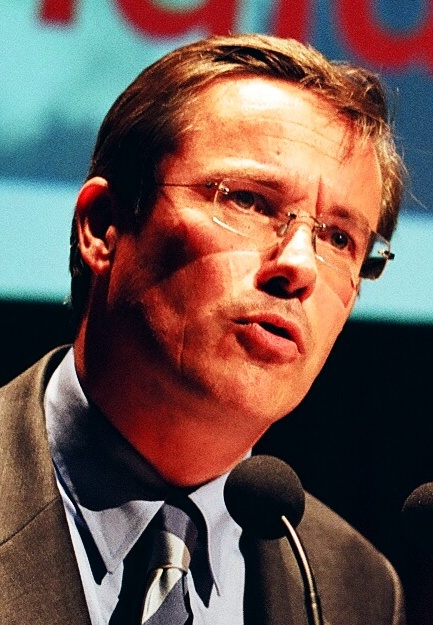
Candidate	Alain Juppé	Nicolas Dupont-Aignan
Popular vote	37,822	7,098
Percentage	79.42%	14.91%
President before election
party created
Elected President
Alain Juppé

The 2002 Union for a Popular Movement leadership election was held on November 17, 2002, to elect the leadership of the newly created Union for a Popular Movement (Union pour un mouvement populaire, UMP).

Alain Juppé, a former Prime Minister and close ally of President Jacques Chirac, became the new party's first president.

== Presidential candidates ==
Candidates seeking to run for the party presidency needed to win the endorsements of at least 3% of party members. Each candidate created a "ticket" with two other party members for the offices of vice-president and secretary-general of the UMP.

- Alain Juppé: mayor of Bordeaux, deputy for the Gironde's 2nd constituency and former Prime Minister between 1995 and 1997 (ex-RPR)
  - Candidate for vice president: Jean-Claude Gaudin, mayor of Marseille and Senator for the Bouches-du-Rhône (ex-DL)
  - Candidate for secretary-general: Philippe Douste-Blazy, mayor of Toulouse and deputy of the Haute-Garonne's 1st constituency (ex-UDF)
- Nicolas Dupont-Aignan: mayor of Yerres and deputy for the Essonne's 8th constituency (ex-RPR)
  - Candidate for vice president: Sylvie Perrin (ex-RPR)
  - Candidate for secretary-general: Christophe Beaudouin (ex-RPR)
- Rachid Kaci: former member of Alain Madelin's campaign staff in the 2002 presidential election (ex-DL)
  - Candidate for vice president: Alexandre del Valle (ex-RPR)
  - Candidate for secretary-general: Monique Boury
- Brigitte Freytag: ex-RPR
  - Candidate for vice president: Alexandre Chermezon (ex-RPR)
  - Candidate for secretary-general: Cyril Lendrin (ex-RPR)
- Mourad Ghazli: ex-RPR
  - Candidate for vice president: Catherine Rigny
  - Candidate for secretary-general: Philippe Licha

== Results ==
UMP leadership election results
Party	Candidate	Votes	%
UMP	Alain Juppé / Jean-Claude Gaudin and Philippe Douste-Blazy	37,822	79.42
UMP	Nicolas Dupont-Aignan / Sylvie Perrin and Christophe Beaudouin	7,098	14.91
UMP	Rachid Kaci / Alexandre del Valle and Monique Boury	1,510	3.17
UMP	Brigitte Freytag / Alexandre Chermezon and Cyril Lendrin	808	1.7
UMP	Mourad Ghazli / Catherine Rigny and Philippe Licha	382	0.8
