= Essonne's 8th constituency =

Constituency of the National Assembly of France

8th constituency of Essonne
- inline Constituency of the National Assembly of France

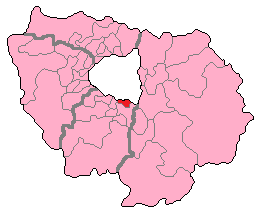
- Essonne's 8th Constituency shown within Île-de-France
- Deputy: Bérenger Cernon; LFI
- Department: Essonne
- Cantons: Brunoy, Montgeron, Vigneux-sur-Seine, Yerres
- Registered voters: 75,338

The 8th constituency of Essonne is a French legislative constituency in the Essonne department. Its member of the National Assembly has been Bérenger Cernon since 2024.

== Description ==
The 8th constituency of Essonne is in the north east of the department and consists of the Parisian suburbs around Yerres and Vigneux-sur-Seine. The seat was created in 1986 as the number of seats in Essonne grew from four to ten reflecting the rapidly increasing population and urbanisation of the department.

Against the national trend the seat was won by Gaullist Nicolas Dupont-Aignan in 1997. Dupont-Aignan went on to break away from the mainstream Union for a Popular Movement with his own Debout La France party. The party campaigns on a more traditional Gaullist platform but has met with little electoral success outside its leaders home seat.

== Historic Representation ==
Election	Member	Party
1988	Michel Berson	PS
1993	Michel Berson	PS
1997	Nicolas Dupont-Aignan	RPR
2002	Nicolas Dupont-Aignan	UMP
2007	Nicolas Dupont-Aignan	DLR
2012	Nicolas Dupont-Aignan	DLR
2017	Nicolas Dupont-Aignan	DLF
2022	Nicolas Dupont-Aignan	DLF
2024	Bérenger Cernon	LFI

== Election results ==
=== 2024 ===
Candidate	Party	Alliance	First round			Second round		
Candidate	Party	Alliance	Votes	%	+/–	Votes	%	+/–
Bérenger Cernon	LFI	NFP	16,986	34.37	+3.87	20,185	40.52	-2.22
Nicolas Dupont-Aignan	DLF		16,288	32.96	-0.38	18,672	37.48	-19.78
François Durovray	LR		13,532	27.38	+17.35	10,960	22.00	N/A
Amina Bouatlaoui	DIV		1,683	3.41	N/A			
Chantal Duboulay	LO		432	0.87	-0.08			
Lolita Duquenoy	DIV		283	0.57	N/A			
Jean-Baptiste Taofifenua	DIV		218	0.44	N/A			
Valid votes			49,422	97.75	-0.55	49,817	98.14	+4.80
Blank votes			818	1.62	+0.37	737	1.45	-3.76
Null votes			318	0.63	+0.18	205	0.40	-1.04
Turnout			50,558	66.03	+18.62	50,759	66.28	+18.75
Abstentions			26,007	33.97	-18.62	25,819	33.72	-18.75
Registered voters			76,565			76,578		
Source: Ministry of the Interior, Le Monde
Result						LFI GAIN FROM DLF		

=== 2022 ===
Legislative Election 2022: Essonne's 8th constituency
Party	Candidate	Votes	%	±%
DLF (UPF)	Nicolas Dupont-Aignan	11,804	33.34	+3.59
LFI (NUPÉS)	Emilie Chazette-Guillet	10,799	30.50	+11.75
LREM (Ensemble)	Mohamed Bida	7,929	22.39	−13.37
LR (UDC)	Nicolas Dohin	3,551	10.03	+4.03
DIV	Daniel Jacob	759	2.14	N/A
EXG	Chantal Duboulay	337	0.95	N/A
DIV	Jean-Claude Guiguet	228	0.64	N/A
Turnout		36,020	47.41	−3.03
2nd round result
DLF (UPF)	Nicolas Dupont-Aignan	19,306	57.26	+5.21
LFI (NUPÉS)	Emilie Chazette-Guillet	14,413	42.74	N/A
Turnout		33,719	47.53	+0.67
DLF hold				

=== 2017 ===
2017 legislative election in Essonne's 8th constituency
Candidates	Party	First round		Second round	
Candidates	Party	Votes	%	Votes	%
Nicolas Dupont-Aignan	DLF	11,281	29.75%	17,344	52.05%
Antoine Pavamani	LREM	13,558	35.76%	15,980	47.95%
Jérôme Flament	FI	4,511	11.90%		
Irvin Bida	UDI	2,275	6.00%		
Faten Ben Ahmed	PS	1,876	4.95%		
Benjamin Boucher	FN	1,625	4.29%		
Geneviève Morin	PCF	720	1.90%		
Fayçal Laaraj	SE	487	1.28%		
Kile-Olivier Yenge	SE	379	1.00%		
Carla Robinet	DVD	253	0.67%		
Christophe Joseph	DVG	242	0.64%		
Laurent Tournier	LO	209	0.55%		
Yannis Hagel	SE	194	0.51%		
Farid Ghehioueche	PE	159	0.42%		
Jacques Cajat	SE	146	0.39%		
Valid Votes		37,915	49.59%	33,324	43.58%
Spoilt and null votes		650	0.85%	2,508	3.28%
Votes cast/turnout		38,565	50.44%	35,832	46.86%
Abstentions		37,899	49.56%	40,626	53.14%
Registered voters		76,464		76,458	

=== 2012 ===
2012 legislative election in Essonne's 8th constituency
Candidate	Party	First round		Second round	
Candidate	Party	Votes	%	Votes	%
Nicolas Dupont-Aignan	DLR	18,904	42.82%	25,989	61.39%
Aude Bristot	PS	13,331	30.20%	16,342	38.61%
Laurent Beteille	UMP	4,204	9.52%		
Marie-Thérèse Donzeau	FN	3,136	7.10%		
Véronique Latapie	FG	2,413	5.47%		
Florie Le Vaguerese-Marie	EELV	968	2.19%		
Éric Valat	MoDem	473	1.07%		
Farid Ghehiouèche	Cannabis sans frontières	187	0.42%		
Denis Morel	AEI	168	0.38%		
Thomas Chust	NPA	128	0.29%		
Laurent Tournier	LO	107	0.24%		
Janathi Jeyakumar	NC	70	0.16%		
Frédéric Beaubaton	POI	56	0.13%		
Valid votes		44,145	99.32%	42,331	98.27%
Spoilt and null votes		301	0.68%	746	1.73%
Votes cast / turnout		44,446	58.99%	43,077	57.18%
Abstentions		30,893	41.01%	32,261	42.82%
Registered voters		75,339	100.00%	75,338	100.00%

== Sources ==
Official results of French elections from 2002: "Résultats électoraux officiels en France" (in French).
