= Bérenger Cernon =

French politician (born 1988)

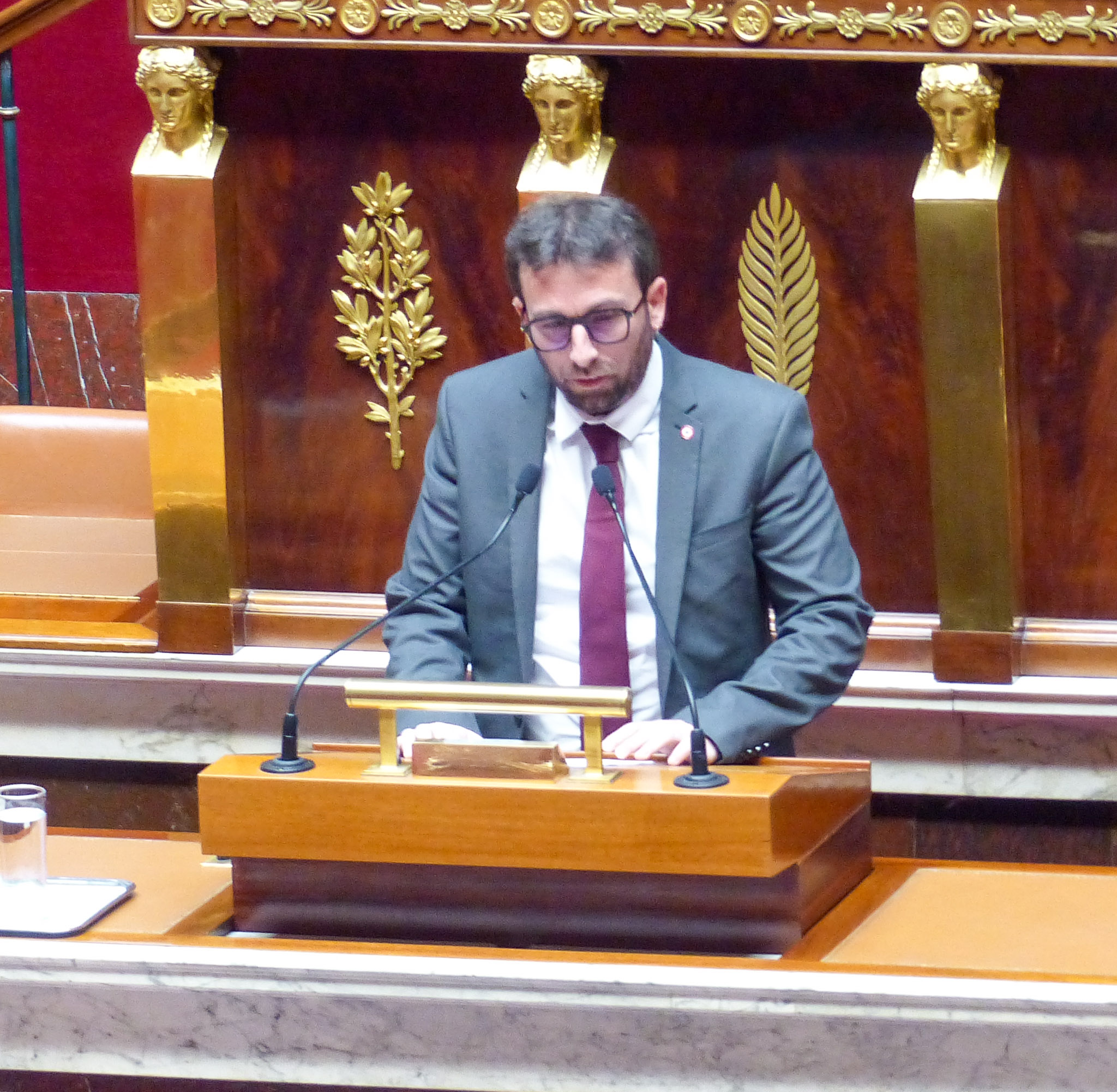
- Bérenger Cernon

Member of the French National Assembly for Essonne's 8th constituency
- Incumbent
- Assumed office 18 July 2024
- Preceded by: Nicolas Dupont-Aignan

Personal details
- Born: 2 May 1988 (age 38)
- Party: La France Insoumise
- Other political affiliations: New Popular Front

Bérenger Cernon (born 2 May 1988) is a French train driver, trade unionist, and politician of La France Insoumise. In the 2024 legislative election, he was elected member of the National Assembly for Essonne's 8th constituency. He previously served as secretary general of the General Confederation of Labour at Gare de Lyon. In the 2024 European Parliament election, he was a candidate for member of the European Parliament.
