= Astana process =

Syrian civil war peace talks begun in 2017

The Astana Process (also the Astana Format) is an international diplomatic negotiating format for the settlement of the Syrian civil war, established in January 2017 with the participation of Russia, Turkey and Iran. It was named after the venue of the first talks, Astana, the capital of Kazakhstan.

The talks were organised with the assistance of the President of Kazakhstan, Nursultan Nazarbayev, who in December 2016 supported a proposal by the presidents of Russia, Vladimir Putin, and Turkey, Recep Tayyip Erdoğan, to hold intra-Syrian talks in Astana. Kazakhstan provided the venue for the meetings and organisational support for the negotiating process, while Russia, Turkey and Iran acted as guarantor states of the agreements reached.

The first round took place on 23–24 January 2017 with the participation of representatives of the Syrian government and the armed opposition. The main objectives of the process were to secure the ceasefire, reduce the intensity of hostilities, address humanitarian issues and facilitate a political settlement of the conflict. The Astana process developed in parallel with the Geneva peace talks under the auspices of the United Nations.

One of the main results was the signing in May 2017 of a memorandum on the creation of four de-escalation zones in Syria. The format also discussed the exchange of detainees, the return of refugees, humanitarian aid and the creation of the Syrian Constitutional Committee. By November 2024, 22 international meetings had been held in the Astana format.

== Background ==
The Syrian civil war began in 2011 after the suppression of anti-government protests. The conflict subsequently escalated into an armed confrontation between government forces, various opposition groups and terrorist organisations. Foreign states supporting different sides of the conflict became involved in the hostilities. International settlement efforts were undertaken primarily within the framework of the UN-sponsored Geneva peace talks. Despite diplomatic efforts, fighting continued. The main obstacles to reaching an agreement remained disagreements over the future of President Bashar al-Assad, the composition of transitional authorities and the conditions for a ceasefire.

In 2016, the military situation shifted in favour of the Syrian government. In December, government forces, supported by Russia and Iran, regained control of the eastern districts of Aleppo, which had previously been held by the armed opposition. Against this background, Russia and Turkey intensified diplomatic contacts on the Syrian issue. On 16 December 2016, Vladimir Putin announced an agreement with Recep Tayyip Erdoğan to propose a new round of peace talks in Astana. Putin stated his intention to ask the President of Kazakhstan, Nursultan Nazarbayev, to support holding the meeting.

On 20 December, the foreign ministers of Russia, Turkey and Iran adopted a joint statement in Moscow, in which they reaffirmed the need for a political settlement of the Syrian conflict and expressed their readiness to help bring about a cessation of hostilities.

On 29 December 2016, through Russian and Turkish mediation, a ceasefire agreement was reached between the Syrian government and a number of armed opposition groups. On 31 December, the UN Security Council adopted a resolution welcoming the efforts to establish a truce and the plans to hold talks in Astana.

The new negotiating format was intended to complement the Geneva talks by focusing on practical issues of securing the ceasefire and interaction between the warring parties.

Earlier, in May and October 2015, meetings of representatives of the Syrian opposition had already been held in Astana, resulting in the formation of a political association known as the Astana Platform. However, the Astana process that began in January 2017 was a separate negotiating format with a different set of participants and objectives.

== Participants ==
=== Guarantor states ===
The main guarantor states of the Astana process were Russia, Turkey and Iran. Despite differences in their positions on the future of Syria, the three states agreed to coordinate efforts to end hostilities and achieve a political settlement.

Russia was one of the main military and political allies of Bashar al-Assad's government. Since September 2015, the Russian armed forces had been involved in the Syrian conflict on the side of government troops. Within the Astana process, the Russian side took part in drafting ceasefire agreements, creating de-escalation zones and coordinating political initiatives.

Turkey supported a number of Syrian opposition groups and opposed Bashar al-Assad remaining in power. Issues of security on the Turkish–Syrian border and countering Kurdish armed groups, which the Turkish authorities regarded as a threat to national security, occupied an important place in its policy.

Iran provided political and military support to the Syrian government. Its participation in the Astana process ensured interaction with Damascus and the armed groups allied with it.

Meetings of the guarantor states were held at the level of diplomatic and military representatives, foreign ministers and heads of state.

=== Syrian parties ===
Representatives of the Syrian government and the armed opposition took part in the negotiations.

At the first round in January 2017, the government delegation was headed by Syria's Permanent Representative to the UN, Bashar Jaafari. The armed opposition delegation was headed by Mohammed Alloush, a representative of the group Jaysh al-Islam.

The composition of the opposition delegations varied from round to round. Some armed groups refused to take part in the meetings, citing violations of the ceasefire and their objection to Iran's participation as a guarantor state.

Unlike the Geneva talks, which were initially focused mainly on negotiations with the political opposition, representatives of armed groups played a significant role in Astana.

=== Kazakhstan ===
Kazakhstan acted as the host of the Astana process. The President of Kazakhstan, Nursultan Nazarbayev, supported holding intra-Syrian talks in Astana, and the Kazakh authorities provided the organisational and diplomatic conditions for the meetings. According to Nazarbayev's memoirs, the proposal for Kazakhstan's involvement in the talks originally came from the Syrian opposition: the founder of the Movement for a Pluralistic Society, Randa Kassis, made the proposal, taking into account the head of state's stable relations with the leaders of various countries.

In January 2017, Kazakhstan's Minister of Foreign Affairs, Kairat Abdrakhmanov, took part in the opening ceremony of the talks and read out the final statement of the guarantor states.

=== International organisations and observers ===
Representatives of the United Nations took part in the talks, including the Special Envoys of the Secretary-General for Syria, Staffan de Mistura and Geir Pedersen.

At various stages, representatives of the United States, Jordan, Iraq and Lebanon were invited as observers. The US Ambassador to Kazakhstan, George Krol, attended the talks as an observer on behalf of the United States. Moscow and Ankara invited the US to send a full delegation to the peace talks in Kazakhstan, but the American side declined, citing the transfer of power in the United States (the inauguration of the 45th President of the United States, Donald Trump, took place at the same time as the preparations for the Syria talks).

Representatives of the International Committee of the Red Cross took part in discussions of humanitarian issues.

== Course of the negotiations ==
=== First stage (2017) ===
The first round of talks took place on 23–24 January 2017 in Astana. Its main goal was to strengthen the ceasefire that had entered into force on 30 December 2016.

Representatives of the opposition groups (according to the spokesman of the opposition delegation, Yahya al-Aridi) named the following among their goals:

- Full compliance with the ceasefire agreements reached between Russia and Turkey on 30 December 2016.
- Consideration of humanitarian and military violations allegedly committed by security forces controlled by the Syrian government and by armed pro-government groups receiving support from Iran (for example, in Wadi Barada, in Homs, and in southern Damascus).
- Withdrawal of all foreign armed formations from Syrian territory.
- Removal of Iran from the list of guarantor states of the truce.
- Organisation of safe corridors for the delivery of humanitarian aid.

The talks were held mainly in the form of indirect consultations. The representatives of the Syrian opposition submitted their demands to Moscow and Ankara, refusing to negotiate with Tehran. The representatives of official Damascus did not accept these conditions. No joint communiqué of the Syrian parties was signed. At the same time, Russia, Turkey and Iran issued a joint statement in which they reaffirmed their commitment to the sovereignty and territorial integrity of Syria and stressed that there was no military solution to the conflict. The final document was read out by Kazakhstan's Minister of Foreign Affairs, Kairat Abdrakhmanov. The guarantor states agreed to establish a trilateral mechanism to monitor compliance with the ceasefire.

The second round took place on 15–16 February 2017. The participants discussed the creation of a joint group to monitor the truce and issues of exchanging detainees.

The third round took place on 14–15 March 2017. The delegation of the armed opposition refused to take part, citing violations of the ceasefire. The guarantor states continued consultations on military-technical and humanitarian issues.

At the fourth round, held on 3–4 May 2017, Russia, Turkey and Iran signed a memorandum on the creation of four de-escalation zones in Syria. The document became one of the main agreements of the Astana process.

The fifth round took place on 4–5 July 2017. It discussed the boundaries of the de-escalation zones, the creation of a joint working group and the technical conditions for implementing the May memorandum.

During the sixth round on 14–15 September 2017, additional parameters for the functioning of the de-escalation zones were agreed, including in Idlib Province.

By the end of 2017, the Astana process had become a regular negotiating mechanism on issues of the ceasefire, humanitarian aid and the political settlement of the Syrian conflict.

=== 2018–2019 ===
In 2018, the talks continued against the background of a changing military and political situation in Syria. Government forces regained control of a number of territories previously included in the de-escalation zones.

On 29–30 January 2018, the Syrian National Dialogue Congress was held in the Russian city of Sochi, organised with the support of the guarantor states of the Astana process.

One of the results of the congress was a proposal to create a Syrian Constitutional Committee, which was to take part in preparing constitutional reform.

In September 2018, the presidents of Russia and Turkey, Vladimir Putin and Recep Tayyip Erdoğan, concluded a separate agreement on the creation of a demilitarised zone in Idlib Province. The agreement became part of the broader cooperation of the two countries on the Syrian settlement.

In 2019, the main topics of the talks remained the situation in Idlib, the exchange of detainees, the return of refugees and the formation of the constitutional committee.

In September 2019, the UN announced that agreement had been reached on the composition of the Syrian Constitutional Committee. Its first session was held on 30 October in Geneva.

The creation of the committee was the result of multilateral diplomatic efforts involving the UN, the Syrian parties and the guarantor states of the Astana process.

=== Talks in 2020–2022 ===
In 2020, the situation in Idlib Province, where fighting continued, remained one of the main topics of interaction between Russia and Turkey.

On 5 March 2020, the presidents of Russia and Turkey reached an agreement in Moscow on a ceasefire in Idlib. It provided for the creation of a security corridor along the M4 highway and the organisation of joint Russian–Turkish patrols.

Although the agreement was concluded outside a regular round of talks in Astana, it reflected the continuing cooperation of the two states within the framework of the Syrian settlement.

In 2021–2022, the international meetings continued in Nur-Sultan. Participants discussed compliance with the ceasefire, humanitarian aid, the activities of the Syrian Constitutional Committee and the conditions for the return of refugees.

On 19 July 2022, a trilateral meeting of the presidents of Russia, Turkey and Iran devoted to the Syrian settlement was held in Tehran.

=== Talks in 2023 ===
In 2023, the attention of the participants in the Astana process was focused on the situation in northern Syria and the prospects for normalising relations between Turkey and the Syrian government.

In April 2023, consultations of the defence ministers of Russia, Turkey, Iran and Syria were held in Moscow. In May, a meeting of the foreign ministers of the four countries took place.

On 20–21 June 2023, the 20th round of international talks on Syria was held in Astana. Participants discussed security, the humanitarian situation, the return of refugees and the political settlement.

After the meeting, representatives of Kazakhstan proposed considering bringing the negotiating process in its previous format to an end, given the changed situation in Syria.

However, the guarantor states continued diplomatic contacts, and in January 2024 talks in Astana resumed.

=== Talks in 2024 ===
The 21st round took place on 24–25 January 2024 in Astana. Participants discussed the situation in northern Syria, countering terrorist organisations, humanitarian issues and the prospects for resuming the work of the Syrian Constitutional Committee.

The 22nd round took place on 11–12 November 2024. It was attended by delegations of Russia, Turkey, Iran, the Syrian government, the UN and observer states. The main topics were regional security, the humanitarian situation, the return of refugees, the exchange of detainees, the search for missing persons and the restoration of Syria's infrastructure. In a joint statement, Russia, Turkey and Iran reaffirmed their commitment to the sovereignty and territorial integrity of Syria, supported the continuation of the political process in accordance with UN Security Council Resolution 2254 and expressed their readiness to facilitate the resumption of the work of the constitutional committee.

== Syrian Constitutional Committee ==
The creation of the Syrian Constitutional Committee was one of the avenues of political settlement discussed within the Astana process. The initiative was developed after the Syrian National Dialogue Congress held in Sochi in January 2018. Subsequently, the composition and procedures of the committee were agreed through UN mediation. In September 2019, UN Secretary-General António Guterres announced that an agreement on its formation had been reached.

The committee consisted of 150 representatives of the Syrian government, the opposition and civil society. A drafting body of 45 members was formed from its membership. Its task was to prepare constitutional reform within the framework of the political process provided for by UN Security Council Resolution 2254. Despite several rounds of sessions, the committee's work encountered significant disagreements between the Syrian parties. By the end of 2024, a new constitution had not been agreed.
