= Randa Kassis =

Franco-Syrian politician (born 1970)

- رندة قسيس
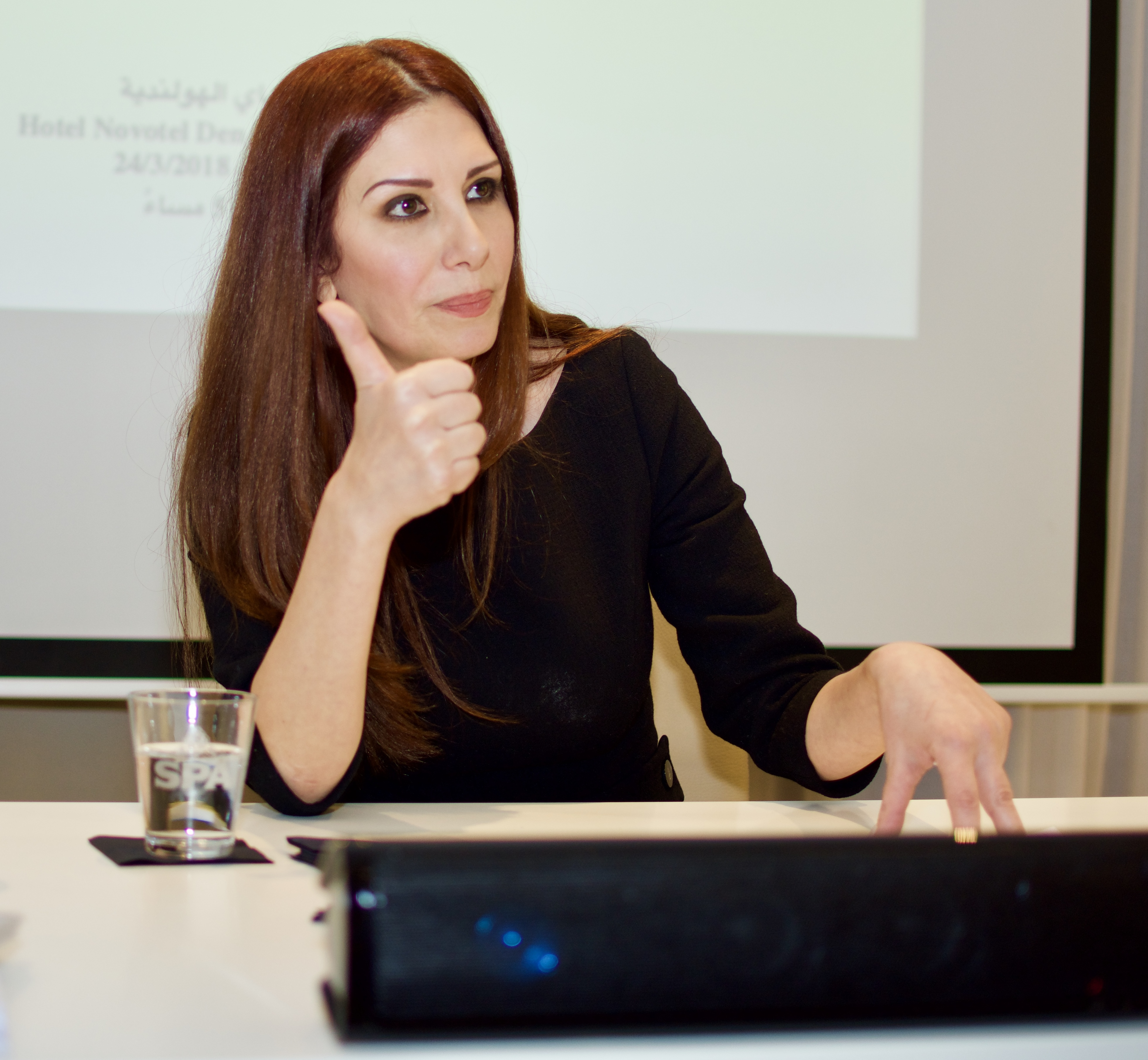
- Kassis in 2018

Personal details
- Born: 8 October 1970 (age 56) Damascus, Syria
- Party: Movement for a Pluralistic Society
- Other political affiliations: Syrian National Council (2011–2012)
- Spouse: Fabien Baussart
- Occupation: Politician; anthropologist; journalist; commentator; writer

Randa Kassis (Arabic: رندة قسيس) is a Franco-Syrian politician, journalist, and anthropologist. Having lived outside Syria since childhood, she emerged as a political figure during the early stages of the Syrian revolution, among opposition circles operating abroad. In 2011, Kassis became a member of the Syrian National Council until her expulsion one year later. During the Syrian civil war, she went on to be a member of the so-called "Moscow Group", a fraction of the Syrian opposition backed by Russia.

Kassis is married to French businessman Fabien Baussart, founder of the think tank Center of Political and Foreign Affairs, and closely connected to the Russian government and Russian business circles. She supported the Russian military intervention in Syria as a means to achieve a political transition, and chaired peace talks held in Astana, Kazakhstan in 2015, an initiative backed by Moscow. However, these talks did not result in a resolution to the conflict prior to the fall of Assad in 2024.

== Biography ==
Kassis is an anthropologist. She was born on 8 October 1970 to a Christian family in Damascus, Syria. Her father, who was an opponent to the Ba'athist regime, had to leave the country: she went to live with him in Algeria when she was nine. She later lived in Europe, living in Germany for several years and later settling in France. There, she briefly considered an acting career and took classes at the Cours Florent drama school.

In 2011, she became chairwoman of the Coalition of Secular and Democratic Syrians, a Paris-based alliance of Muslim, Christian, Arab, and Kurdish parties advocating for minority support against the government of Bashar al-Assad. In that capacity, she became a member of the Syrian National Council (SNC), then the main grouping of Syrian opponents based abroad. In 2012, she was expelled from both the SNC and the Coalition after raising concerns over the increasing influence of Islamist factions within the opposition.

In October 2012, Kassis founded a new group, the Movement for a Pluralistic Society. During the early stages of the Syrian civil war, she appeared in several French media including France Télévisions, France 2 and France 5 (C dans l’air), France 24, Radio France Internationale, and France Culture.

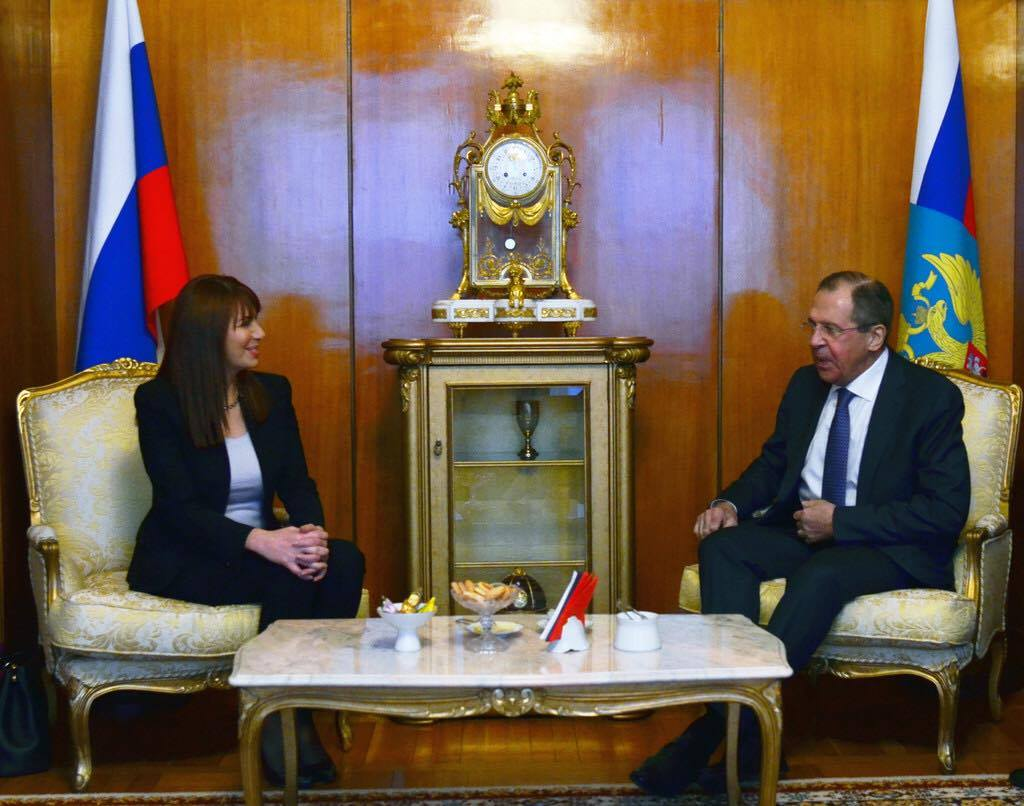
Meeting between Kassis and Russian Foreign Minister Sergey Lavrov in March 2016.

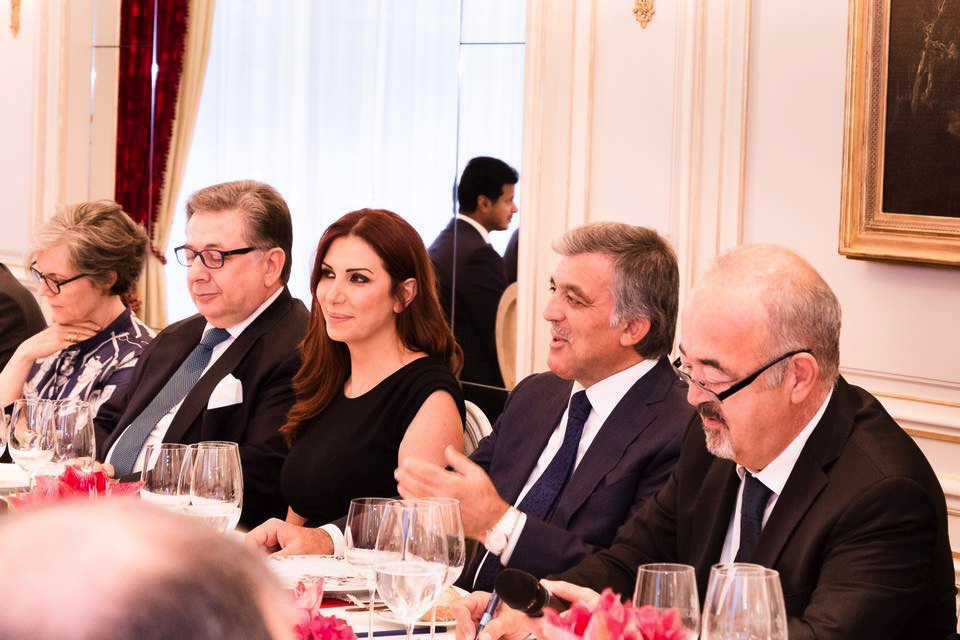
Kassis and with Turkish President Abdullah Gül in September 2016

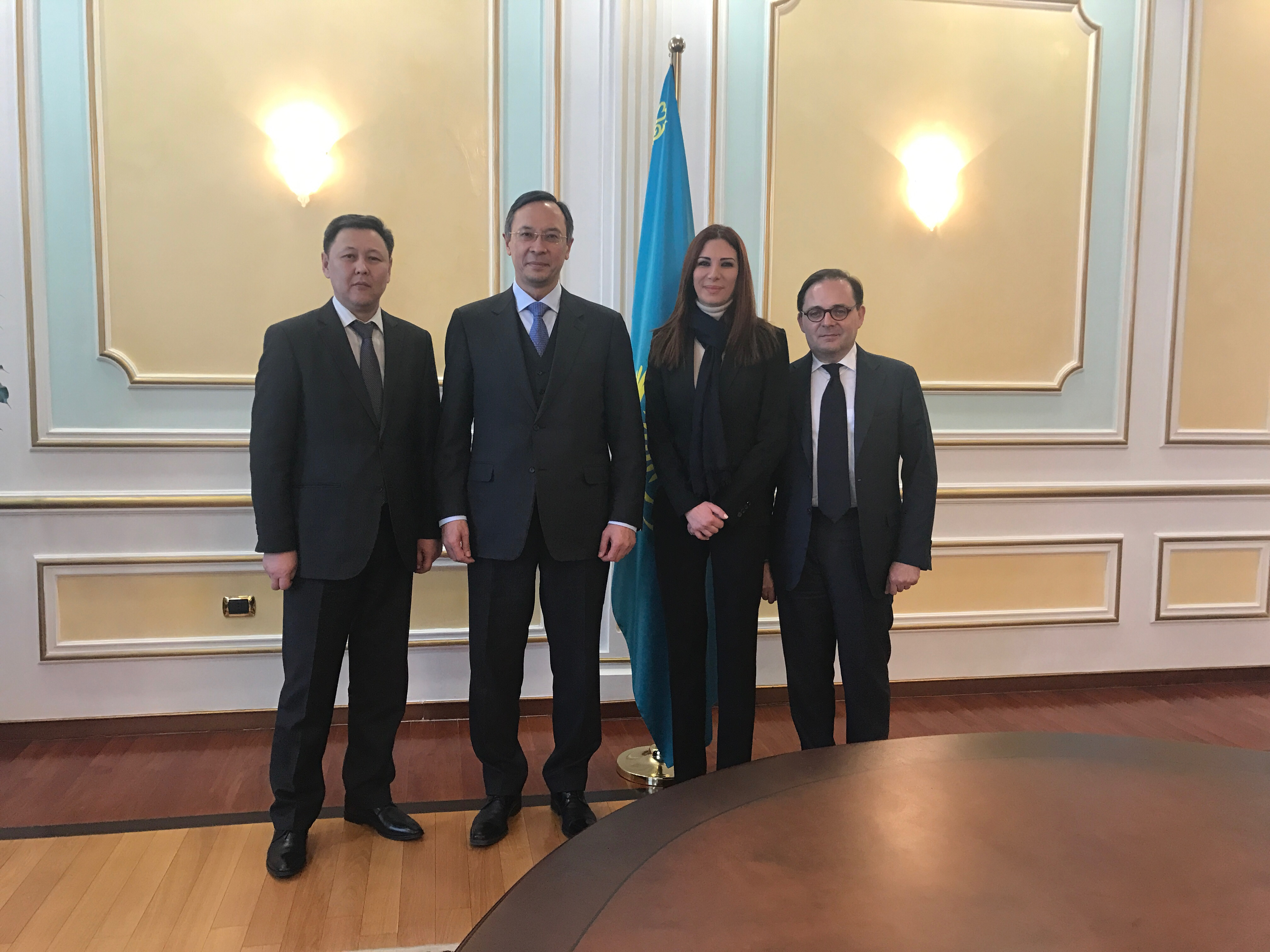
Kassis and Fabien Baussart with Kazakh Foreign Minister Kairat Abdrakhmanov in February 2017

Kassis later supported the Russian intervention in Syria, and advocated for a political transition that would involve cooperation with the Assad government and supported the Russian military intervention in Syria, positions that drew criticism from other factions within the Syrian opposition. In 2015, with Russian support, she chaired peace talks in Astana, Kazakhstan: the stated aims of her initiative, known as the "Astana Platform" was to bring together moderate Syrian opposition figures. While some observers regarded this initiative as a constructive effort to facilitate dialogue, others criticized her for her ties to Russia.

On 11 October 2016, Kassis met at the Hôtel Ritz Paris, with Donald Trump Jr. who later delivered a speech for the Center of Political and Foreign Affairs. Kassis stated for her part that "without Russia, we can’t have any solution in Syria." This meeting was later referenced by the U.S. House Intelligence Committee during investigations into contacts between associates of Donald Trump and individuals linked to Russian interests. Subsequently, Kassis reportedly traveled to Moscow, claiming she could act as a secret communication channel between the Trump administration and Vladimir Putin concerning Syria’s political future.

Randa Kassis participated in the 2016 Geneva III peace talks as part of the Moscow/Astana group. She served as co-president of the delegation alongside Syrian politician Qadri Jamil.

In 2017, Kassis convened a group of Syrian opposition members, academics, and constitutional experts to begin drafting a new constitution for Syria. This effort was supported by French constitutionalist Xavier Latour, former Turkish Foreign Minister Yasar Yakis, and former Italian Foreign Minister Giulio Terzi di Sant'Agata.

On 30 January 2018, Kassis and other members of the Astana Platform participated in the Syrian National Dialogue Congress as part of the presidential committee. She emphasized the formation of a Syrian Constitutional Committee as a necessary step for advancing the Syrian peace process, which was later established in 2019. In October 2018, Kassis worked to bring together various factions of the Syrian opposition to develop a roadmap for peace. The resulting document was drafted by opposition representatives who had been invited to Rome by the Community of Sant'Egidio, a Catholic organization with close ties to the Vatican.

Following the fall of the Assad regime in December 2024, Kassis returned to Damascus in January 2025 with her husband Fabien Baussart. During this visit, they met with Patriarch John X and Sheikh Hikmat al-Hijri, the spiritual leader of the Druze community, to discuss current developments and the future of Syria. Kassis has publicly expressed opposition to Ahmed al-Sharaa and the new Syrian authorities, characterizing them as a "radical regime" that could lead to renewed dictatorship and civil conflict. She has also voiced concerns regarding the new government’s approach toward minority groups.

== Personal ==
Kassis has a daughter, born in 1997. where she had a daughter in 1997. She is married to French businessman Fabien Baussart.

== Bibliography ==
- Crypts of the Gods, Randa Kassis, Editions E- Kutub, 2013 (EN)
- Le Chaos Syrien, printemps arabes et minorités face à l'islamisme, Randa Kassis and Alexandre del Valle, Editions Dhow, 2014 (FR)
- Comprendre le chaos syrien, des révolutions arabes au jihad mondial, L'Artilleur, coll. Toucan essais, 2016 (FR)
- La Syrie et le Retour de la Russie, Editions des Syrtes, 2018 (FR)

== See also ==
- Syrian Civil War
- Secularism in Syria
