= Nicolas Dupont-Aignan =

French politician (born 1961)

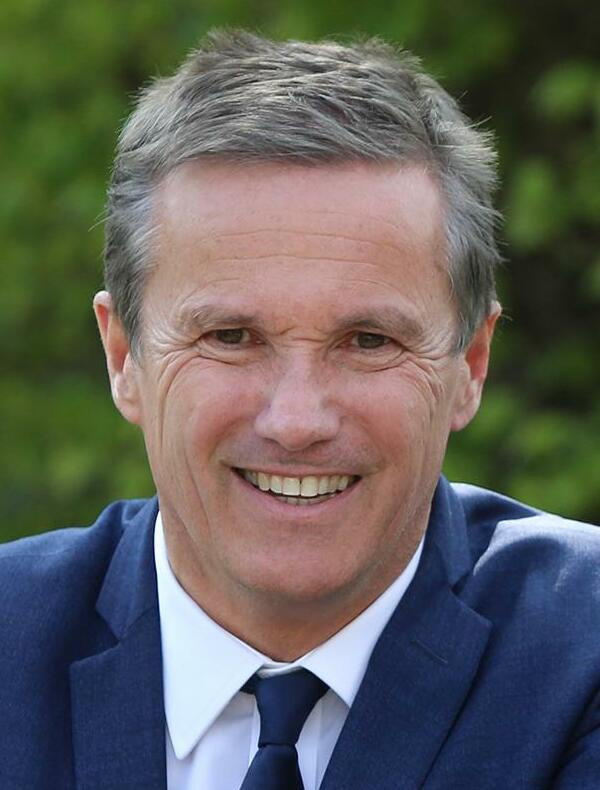
- Aignan in 2019

President of Debout la France
- Incumbent
- Assumed office 23 November 2008
- Preceded by: Position established

Member of the National Assembly for Essonne's 8th constituency
- In office 12 June 1997 – 9 June 2024
- Preceded by: Michel Berson
- Succeeded by: Bérenger Cernon

Mayor of Yerres
- Incumbent
- Assumed office 22 March 2026
- Preceded by: Olivier Clodong
- In office 25 June 1995 – 23 July 2017
- Preceded by: Marc Lucas
- Succeeded by: Olivier Clodong

Personal details
- Born: 7 March 1961 (age 65) Paris, France
- Party: Debout la France (since 2008)
- Other political affiliations: RPR (until 1999); RPF (1999–2002); UMP (2002–2007)
- Children: 2
- Education: Sciences Po; École nationale d'administration

Nicolas Dupont-Aignan (French pronunciation: [nikɔla dypɔ̃(t‿)ɛɲɑ̃]; born 7 March 1961), sometimes referred to by his initials NDA, is a French politician serving since 2008 as president of the minor party Debout la France. He was its only member in the National Assembly, having been elected for Essonne's 8th constituency beginning in 1997; he was previously mayor of Yerres from 1995 to 2017.

A member of the Union for a Popular Movement (UMP) party until January 2007, he then founded the Gaullist and souverainist party Debout la France (DLF; "France Arise") in November 2008, named Debout la République until October 2014 and which was closely linked to the Europeans United for Democracy, a defunct European political party. He ran for President of France in 2012, 2017, and 2022. He endorsed the runner-up Marine Le Pen in the 2017 and 2022 second round elections.

He was unseated in the 2024 French legislative election, but returned as Mayor of Yerres after winning the municipal elections in 2026.

== Early life ==
Nicolas Dupont-Aignan was born Nicolas Dupont on 7 March 1961, in Paris, the son of Jean-Louis Dupont, a wine maker and veteran of the Second World War who escaped a German POW camp, and Colette Aignan.

During his youth, Dupont-Aignan was a member of Rally for the Republic. He campaigned for the Gaullist politician Jacques Chaban-Delmas during the 1974 presidential election.

Dupont-Aignan graduated from Sciences Po in 1982 and acquired his law license in 1984. He received a postgraduate degree from Paris Dauphine University. He also attended the École nationale d'administration, between 1987 and 1989.

== Political career ==
=== Early years ===
Dupont-Aignan began his professional career in politics as a civil administrator and working in several ministerial offices, including that of the Minister of National Education and the Environment. Dupont-Aignan joined Rally for France in 1993 and then began serving in Michel Barnier's ministry of the environment in February 1995 though he refused to support either Édouard Balladur or Jacques Chirac in their presidential campaigns that year. Serving with Michel Barnier, Dupont-Aignan was friendly with multiple Europhile personalities such as Francois Bayrou.

=== National politics ===
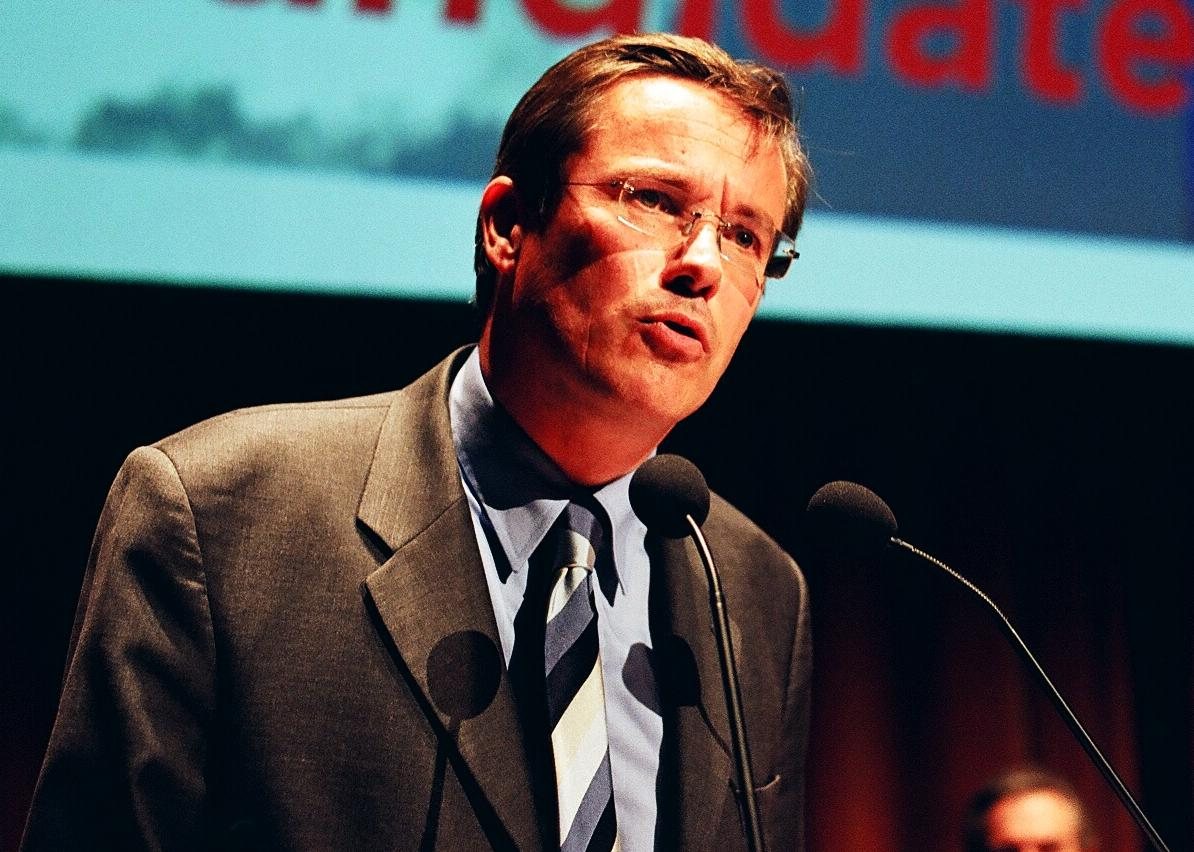
Dupont-Aignan speaking during a meeting in 2005

In the early 1990s, the city of Yerres was in 20 million euros in debt following the closure of a major aquatic centre that shut down a few months after its opening. In the 1995 municipal elections, Dupont-Aignan was elected with 51.8% of the vote against the then-Socialist mayor. He was also reelected in 2008 with 79.70% of the vote in the first round, giving him one of the biggest margins of victory for a mayor in France.

Shortly after becoming mayor, Dupont-Aignan attempted to fix the debt issue by renegotiating the interest rate with banks, he was able to lower the debt from 45 million euros to 34 million euros. Dupont-Aignan took this further by cancelling infrastructure initiatives set by the previous mayor and developed a cheaper plan that included creating communal housing.

In terms of environmental policy, Dupont-Aignan used reprocessed swimming water to clean streets and his environmental policies won awards for the city. A municipal police brigade that could patrol the forest areas was created and CCTV was upgraded. Yerres had a lower crime rate than the rest of Essonne.

Dupont-Aignan was first elected to the National Assembly in 1997 as the member for Essonne's 8th constituency. He was reelected in every subsequent legislative election until 2024. Following the creation of the Union for a Popular Movement (UMP), Dupont-Aignan ran in the leadership election in 2002 and again in 2004, losing both.

Dupont-Aignan also campaigned for a "No" vote in the 2005 French European Constitution referendum, abandoning perceived Gaullist principles. He was one of the only members of the UMP to vote "No".

=== Foundation of Debout la France ===
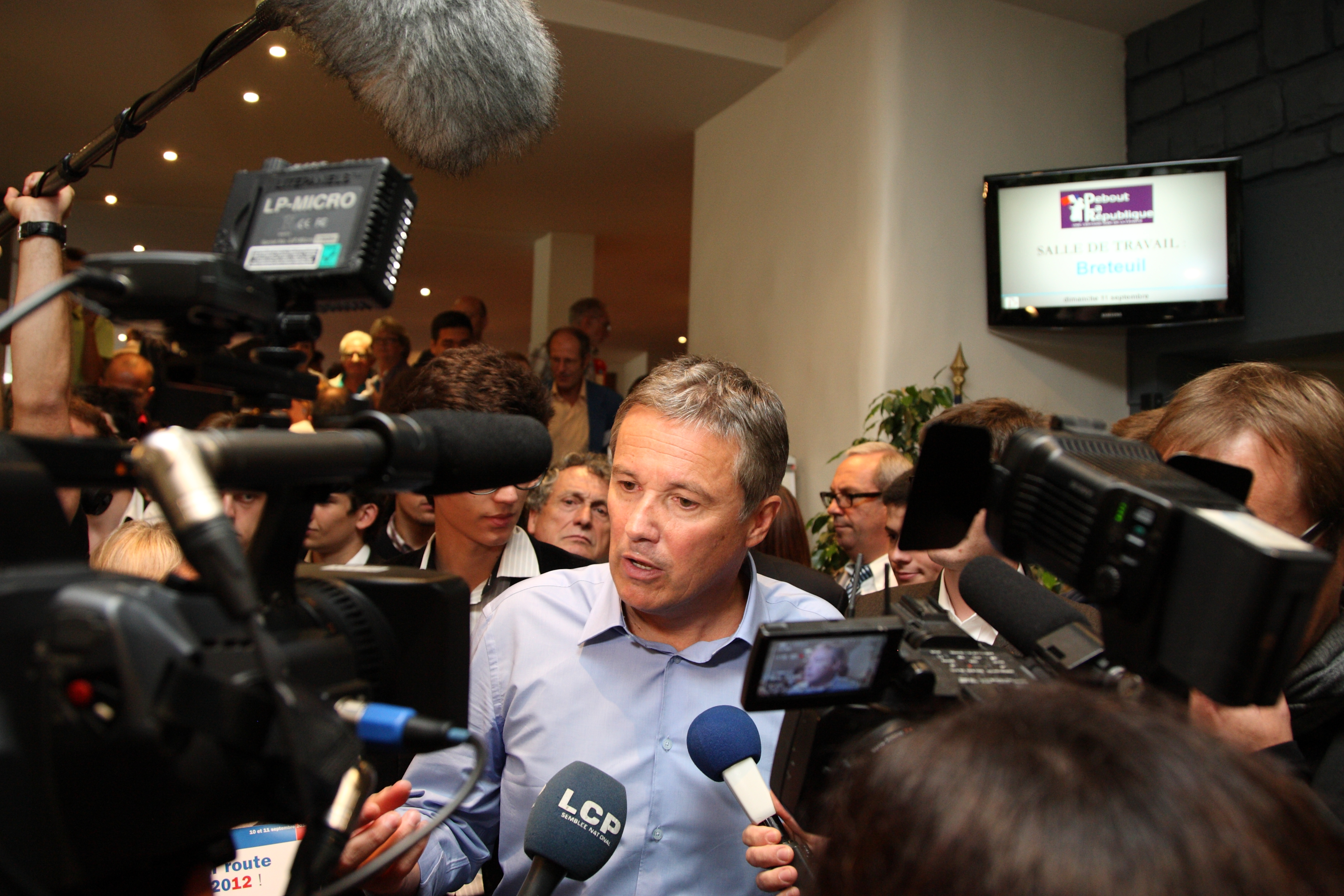
NDA during a Debout la France event in 2011

Following disagreement with the UMP candidate, Nicolas Sarkozy, Dupont-Aignan left the UMP on 13 January 2007. Dupont-Aignan intended to run for the 2007 presidential election but failed to gather the necessary 500 signatures of elected officials.

Following his failure to gather the 500 signatures necessary to run, Dupont-Aignan was reelected in his constituency of Essonne 8th though he was no longer a part of the presidential majority due to disagreements with President Sarkozy over taxes and a pro-American foreign policy, voting alongside the Socialist Party on several occasions.

Dupont-Aignan eventually founded Debout la France on 23 November 2008 with the ambition of founding a third party that could compete with both the right wing UMP and left-wing Socialist Party who he labeled as being the "same". Debout la France contested the 2009 European Parliament election, gaining 2.04% of the vote in Metropolitan France.

=== 2012 presidential election ===
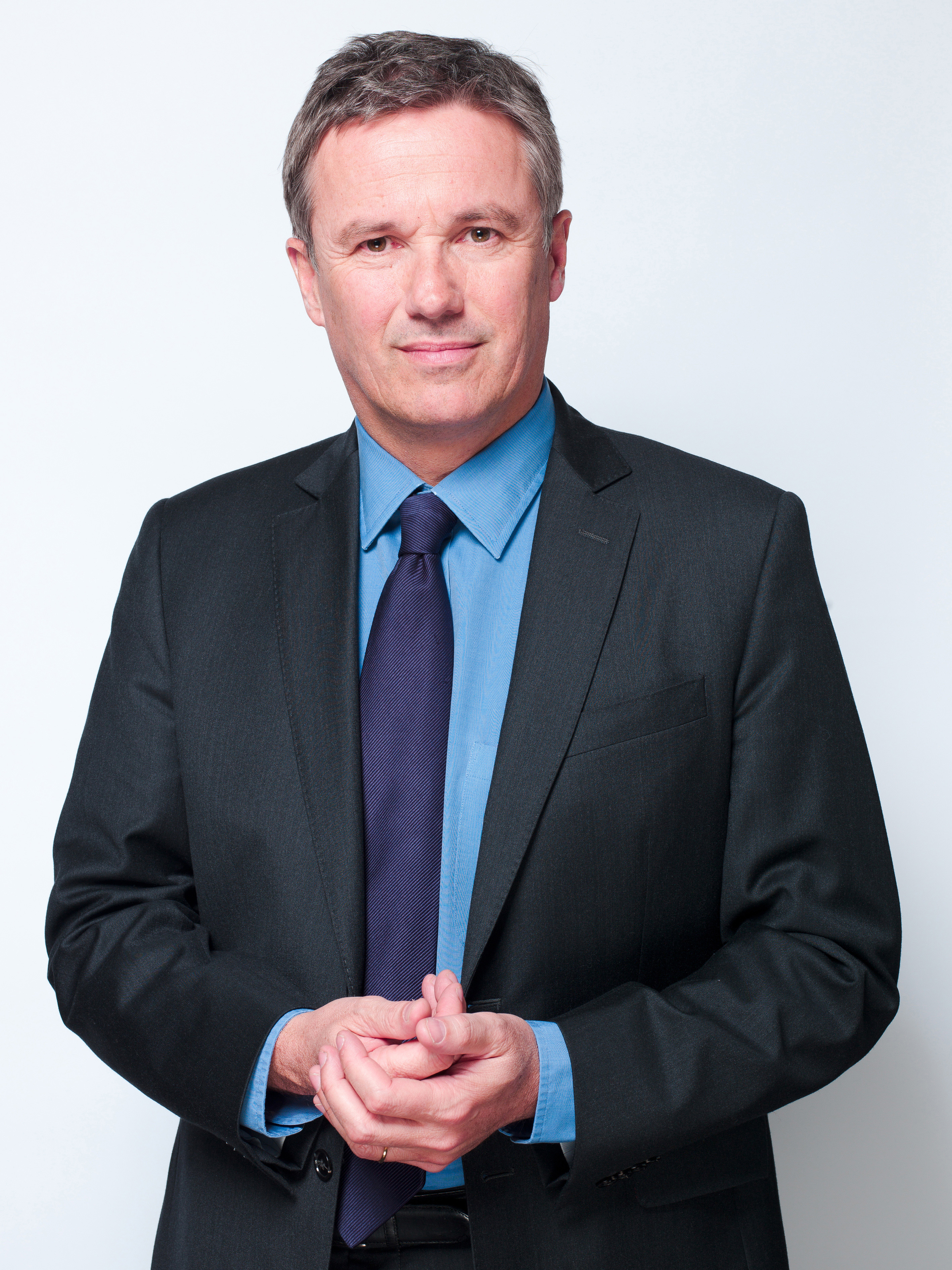
Portrait for the 2012 presidential election

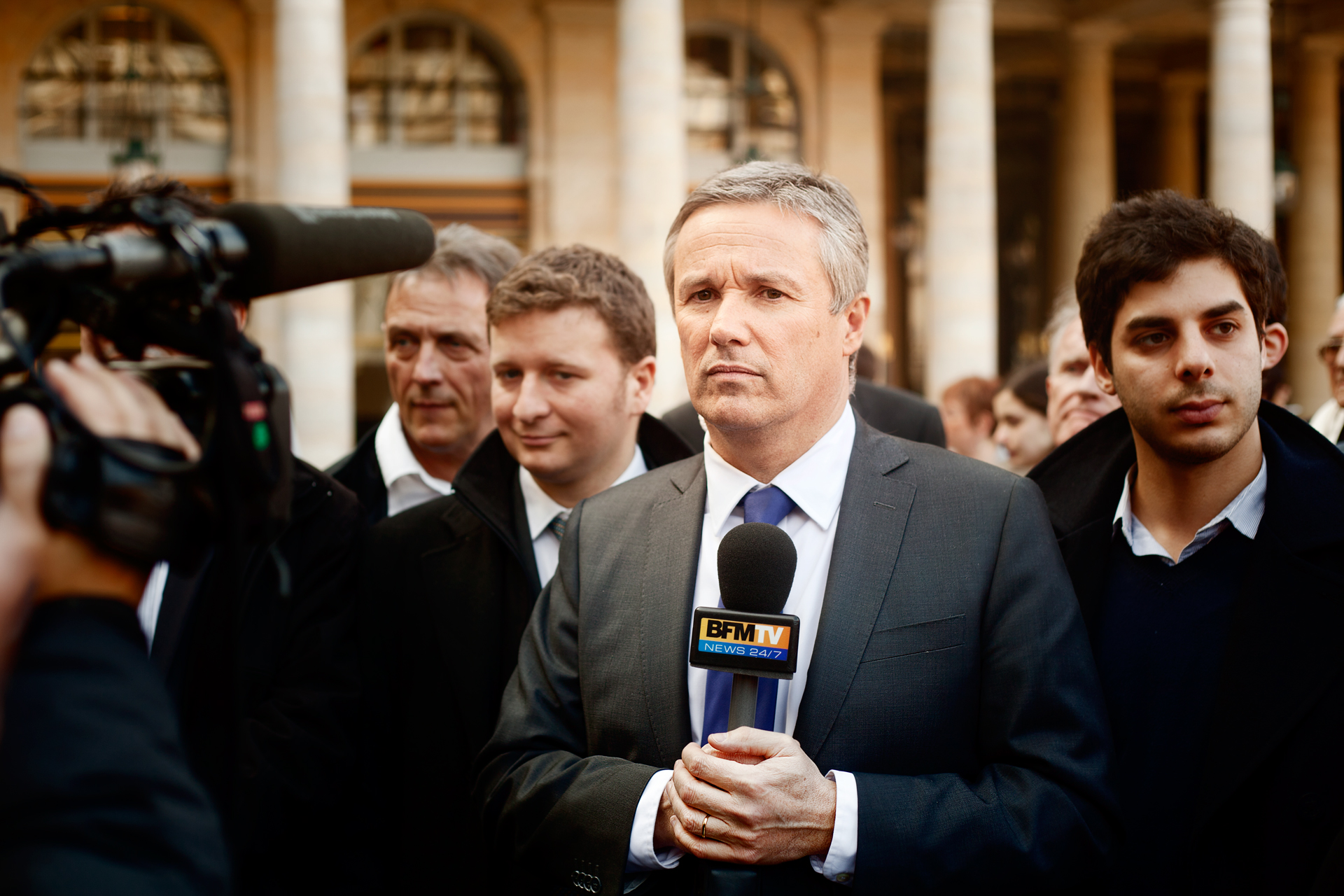
NDA during an interview with BFM TV in front of the Constitutional Council

In November 2010, Dupont-Aignan announced his intention to run for the 2012 presidential election during the annual congress for France Arise, pledging to leave the Euro and return to the Franc, leaving the Euro as a reserve currency. In March 2012 he announced that he had obtained the necessary 500 signatures to run as an official candidate.

Dupont-Aignan received 644,043 votes on the first ballot, or 1.79% of the votes cast, finishing seventh. His best showing (24.88%) was in Yerres, of which he was mayor. He did not endorse any candidate for the second round.

=== 2017 presidential election ===
Dupont-Aignan announced his candidacy for the 2017 presidential election during an interview on TF1 on 15 March 2016. Polls taken shortly after gave Dupont-Aignan a voting intention between 3 and 6%. On 7 March 2017, Dupont-Aignan secured the necessary 500 signatures to run in the 2017 presidential election before releasing his manifesto the following day in the form of a book.

Shortly after the beginning of the first round, Dupont-Aignan denounced Emmanuel Macron, saying that he "served the interests of the rich" and accused Serge Dassault, the owner of Le Figaro, of harassing him through text messages in an attempt to get him to renounce his candidacy in endorsement of François Fillon. Le Figaro denies that Dupont-Aignan was harassed though does not deny text messages were exchanged between the two. On 22 April, Dupont-Aignan organised a petition demanding that three televised debates be shown during the first round with all candidates appearing at the debates. Because he was not invited to the first debate, he left prematurely and denounced TF1 for what he called a "lack of democracy".

In the first voting round of 23 April, Dupont-Aignan came in the sixth place, receiving 1,695,000 votes which represents 4.70% of the vote total. Failing to hit the 5% threshold, Dupont-Aignan was not reimbursed for his campaign funds. During an interview on 28 April 2017, he endorsed Marine Le Pen for the second round saying that he would help her with campaigning.

Marine Le Pen pledged in return to appoint him as Prime Minister of France should she win. The electoral alliance between Debout la France and Front National gathered protesters in Dupont-Aignan's commune, Yerres. Dupont-Aignan was also called a "petainist" and compared to Pierre Laval. Dupont-Aignan also had dissidents within his own party with his "right hand", Olivier Clodong, resigning. Dominique Jamet, Vice President of Debout la France, resigned as well. Le Pen lost the vote in the second round of the election against Emmanuel Macron.

Dupont-Aignan was reelected during the legislative election of 2017; he resigned as Mayor of Yerres later that year and was succeeded by Clodong.

He was reelected in the 2022 election. In the 2024 election, he lost his seat in the second round to New Popular Front's Bérenger Cernon.

== Political positions ==
Dupont-Aignan describes himself as a Gaullist. Although he shares many policies and views with Marine Le Pen, he is considered less hardline than her and has criticised her in the past.

Dupont-Aignan strongly advocates leaving the euro, calling it a "racket", and returning to the franc, retaining the euro only as a reserve currency. Dupont-Aignan has also voiced his support for Rattachism.

== Personal life ==
Dupont-Aignan is married to lawyer and former parliamentary assistant Valérie Vecchierini. The couple have two daughters, Victoire and Sixtine.

During the 2017 presidential election, Dupont-Aignan declared a net worth of more than 2 million euros. In 2013, he declared ownership of a house worth €130,000 in Yerres and an apartment in Paris worth €420,000.
