= The Free Right =

The Free Right (La Droite libre) is a liberal-conservative faction within the Union for a Popular Movement (UMP) founded by Rachid Kaci and Alexandre del Valle. The Free Right is formed mostly by members of Liberal Democracy, though Kaci was close the souverainiste Charles Pasqua at one time.

In the 2002 leadership election, the party obtained 3.17% of the votes running for President of the UMP. During the American election in 2008, the faction supported the Republican ticket of John McCain and Sarah Palin, while most French political elites supported Barack Obama.

Since 2015 the leader is the former deputy Christian Vanneste.
