= Laurent Murawiec =

Laurent Murawiec (Paris 1951 – Washington, 7 October 2009) was a French neoconservative figure, member of the Hudson Institute and of the Committee on the Present Danger, and formerly defence analyst at the RAND corporation. Murawiec was an associate of Lyndon LaRouche from 1973 to 1986, and wrote for Larouche's Executive Intelligence Review in the 1980s.

In July 2002, Murawiec gave a presentation regarding Middle East policy for the USA before the Defence Policy Board Advisory Committee. Murawiec argued that "In the Arab world, violence is not a continuation of politics by other means – violence is politics, politics is violence" and calling for an "ultimatum to the House of Saud", ultimately summarising the "Grand strategy for the Middle East" as "Iraq is the tactical pivot, Saudi Arabia the strategic pivot, Egypt the prize". The presentation was made public by Thomas E. Ricks the following month. Murawiec was subsequently expelled from RAND.

Murawiec died of multiple myeloma on 7 October 2009.

== Works ==
- La Guerre au XXIè siècle, Laurent Murawiec, Odile Jacob, 2000
- L'Esprit des Nations: cultures et géopolitique, Laurent Murawiec, Odile Jacob, 2002
- La Guerre d'après, Laurent Murawiec, Albin Michel, 2003
  - Princes of Darkness: the Saudi Assault on the West, Laurent Murawiec, Rowman and Littlefield, 2005
- Vulnerabilities in the Chinese Way of War, Hudson Institute, 2004
- Aristotle in Cyberspace: Toward a Theory of Information Warfare and The Mind of Jihad, 2005
- Pandora's Boxes
- The Mind of Jihad, Laurent Murawiec, Cambridge University Press, 2008. ISBN 978-0-521-88393-1
- Spring 2000 article "The Wacky World of French Intellectuals" by Laurent Murawiec, Middle East Quarterly
