= Ceinture rouge =

Worker communes in France

The Ceinture rouge ('Red belt') refers to the communes of the Île-de-France that were dominated by the French Communist Party from the 1920s until the 1980s. These communes are those that are traditionally working-class areas whose residents were employed in the heavy and light industries that once dominated the economic landscape of the Petite Couronne (the departments that border Paris) and large population centers in the outer departments of the Île-de-France.

Communes around Paris with a mayor from either the communist PCF or the related FASE party after the 2014 municipal elections.

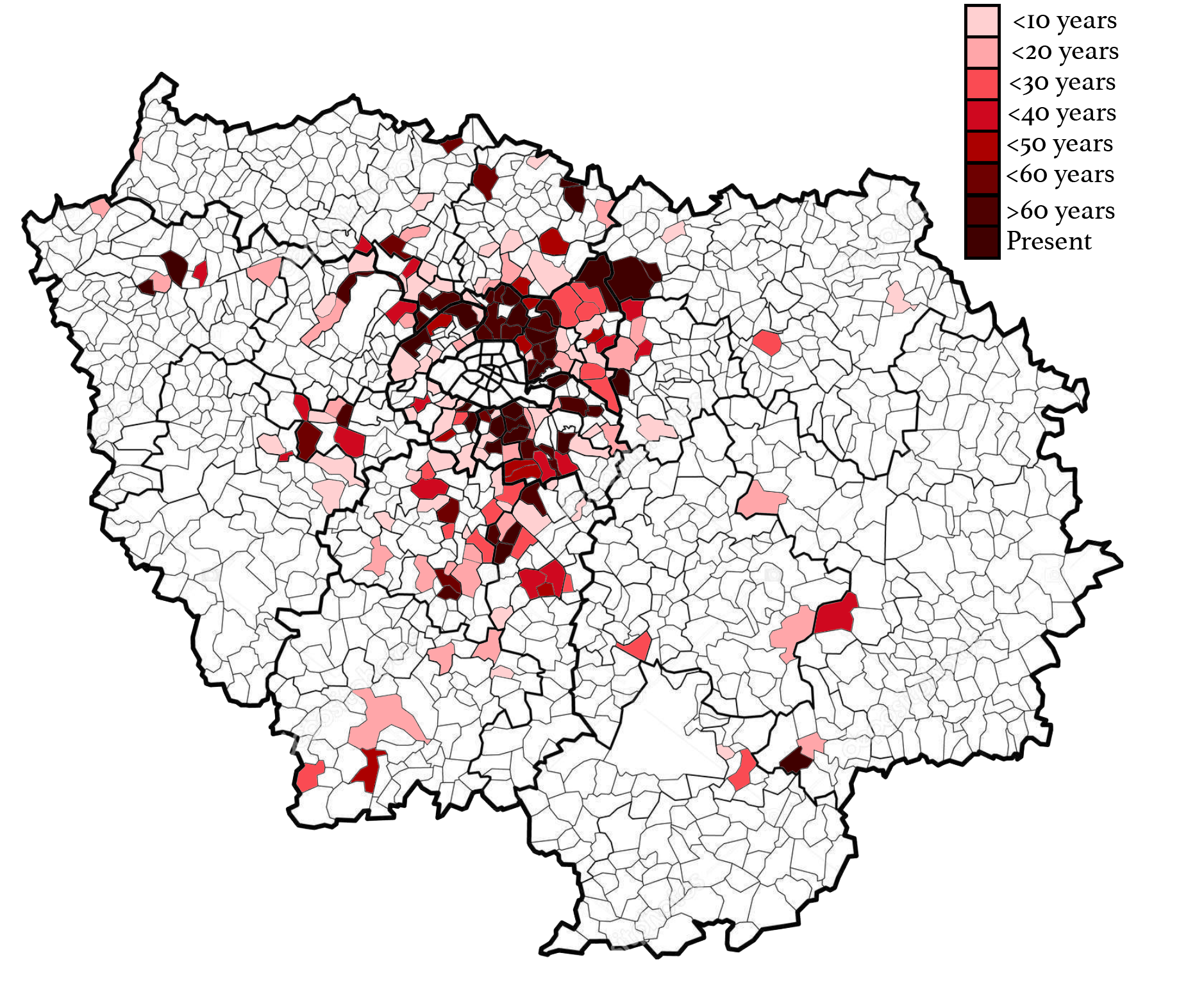
Map of the communes of the Île de France showing the amount of years they were a part of the belt between 1919 and 2025.

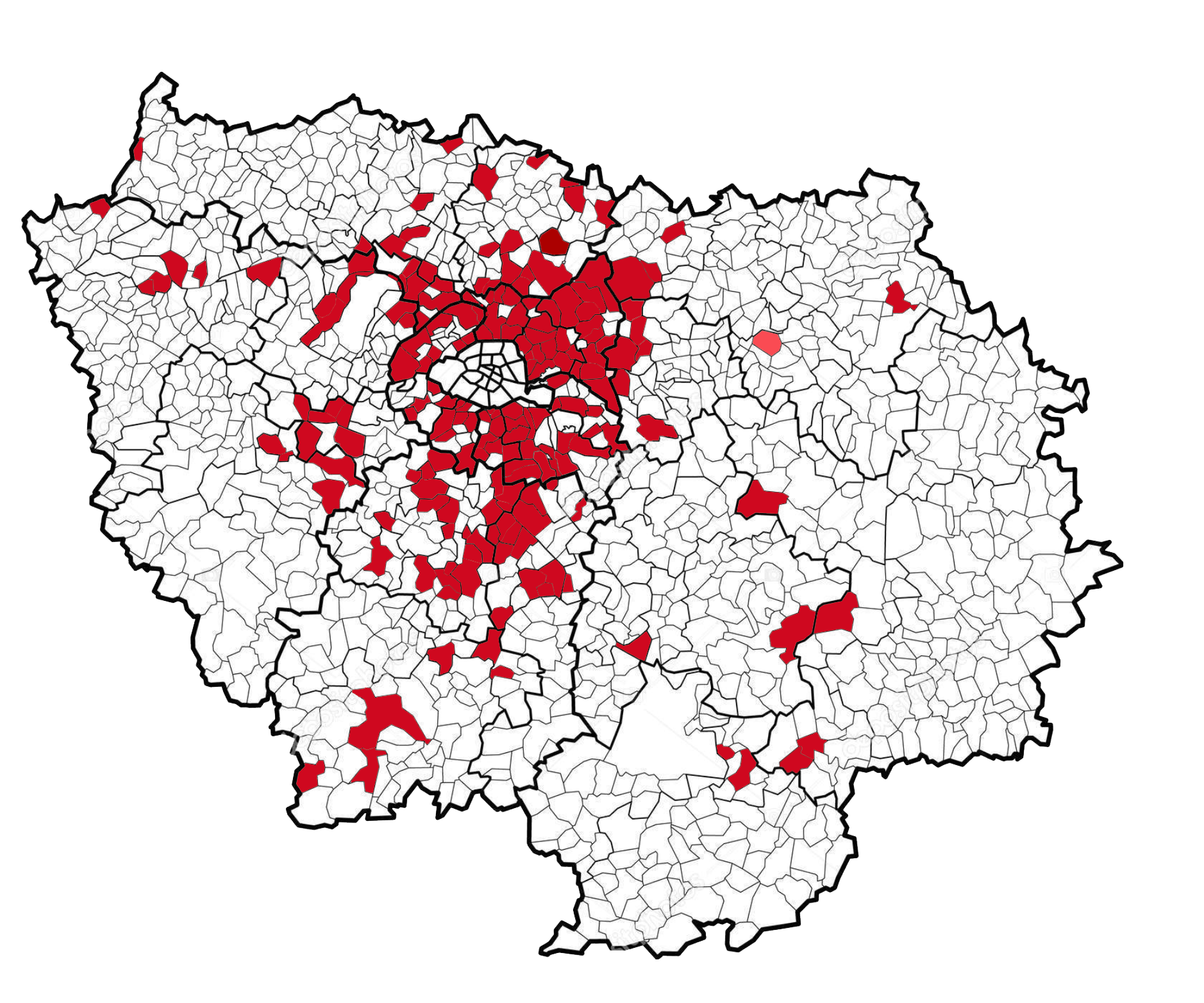
Communes of the Île de France that have historically been part of the belt.

While the phenomenon is not specific to Paris and can also be seen in Lyon, Turin, Milan or Genoa, for example, "its scale and, most importantly, the length of the communist implantation in these municipalities make it a unique phenomenon in Europe".

The strength of the French Communist Party in these areas also led to this party forming the government at the departmental level in Seine-Saint-Denis from its creation in 1967 up to 2008, when control of the Departmental Council went to the Socialist Party of France.

== History ==
=== Beginnings (1920 to 1935) ===
The idea of a "Red belt" takes its roots in the 1920s.

At the 1919 municipal elections, "a first red wave let municipal socialism take roots in communes with an industrial and working-class tradition, such as Aubervilliers and Saint-Denis. A year later, these towns voted for the newly created Communist Party," notes historian Emmanuel Bellanger.

The phrase itself was coined in an article written by Paul Vaillant-Couturier, "Paris encircled by the revolutionary proletariat" after the legislative elections of 1924 and the municipal elections of 1925.

However, at that time, the PCF's tactics of “class against class” only allowed it to win nine towns in 1925: it kept Bezons, Bobigny and Villetaneuse, took Saint-Denis from SFIO dissidents, and Clichy, Malakoff, Vitry-sur-Seine, Ivry-sur-Seine, Villejuif from the right.

In the 1929 municipal elections, the PCF won Pierrefitte-sur-Seine from the right, while Alfortville and Bagnolet were lost to the SFIO.

=== The "golden age" of local-level communism (1935–1981) ===
Municipal elections	Communist municipalities in the inner suburbs ("Petite couronne") of Paris
1935	26
1945	49
1947	28
1953	27
1959	31
1965	34
1971	35
1977	38

==== Front Populaire ====
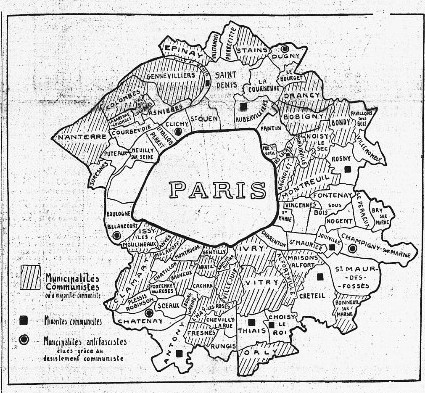
Map of the "red" towns in the Seine département, published in L'Humanité, after the 1935 municipal elections.

The PCF stopped using the "Red belt" as a motto as it engaged in the strategy of the “Front Populaire” alliance for the 1935 municipal elections. The alliance between the PCF and the SFIO captured 26 municipalities. However, it lost its fiefdom of Saint-Denis, as Jacques Doriot, who had been excluded from the communist party in 1934, was reelected.

Thanks to the success of the PCF at the 1935 elections, Georges Marrane, communist mayor of Ivry-sur-Seine, became president of the General Council of the department of Seine in 1936.

The communist party was also successful is the neighbouring Seine-et-Oise department: out of 129 municipalities with a population above 2,500, "red" municipalities rose from 8 to 24 at the 1935 elections: Argenteuil, Aulnay-sous-Bois and Blanc-Mesnil all elect communist mayors. This number rose further to 54 in 1945, the year in which even the very bourgeois city of Versailles had a mayor "close to the communists".

This success can be partially attributed to the housing crisis that brought a large working-class population to the suburbs, where the living conditions were particularly poor. The communist party's agenda, which focused on public investment in housing and healthcare, appeared particularly attractive:

The first urban crises contribute to the success of the "red suburbs" - at the time, it is estimated that 800,000 people live in defective housing projects in the suburbs, which do not have access to basic utilities. Communist municipalities promote social policies, including the development of inexpensive housing, the Habitations à Bon Marché (HBM), which will later become the HLM; the creation of garden cities through the local public housing office; and health centers that democratize access to health services.

==== Aftermath of the second world war ====
The Communist party emerged from World War II as a dominant political force:

The ruptures of the war - the German-Soviet pact, the subsequent banning of the Communist Party and its municipalities, the internal rifts between the party apparatus and elected representatives - did not alter electoral equilibriums. In the first post-war elections, the municipal elections of April 1945, the Communist Party, alone or in association with the SFIO, led the lists of the Patriotic Union of the Resistance and won 60 of the 80 communes of the Seine, 50 of which elected a Communist mayor.

After the second world war, other parties tried to exploit the PCF's political isolation and reduce its stronghold over the Paris suburbs. A 1947 law introduced the proportional allocation of seats in municipal councils for cities with a population above 9,000 inhabitants. Since the PCF could not form alliances with other political parties, it lost 22 communes in Seine-Banlieue to the SFIO and to Charles De Gaulle's RPF in the 1947 elections.

At the end of the 1950s, the PCF's setbacks on the national stage paradoxically illustrated what Pierre Bellanger calls "the resilience of municipal communism". The first of these setbacks was the 1958 constitutional referendum. Despite the PCF's opposition, it was overwhelmingly approved, with a majority in every single département and major city. In the Paris suburbs, Bagnolet was the only "red" city where the "no" was actually ahead. This defeat proved that the PCF was not able to impose its vote, even in its traditional fiefdoms.

Two months later, the PCF was crushed at the 1958 legislatives elections, going from 150 seats to 10. Communist leaders Étienne Fajon, Jacques Duclos and Marie-Claude Vaillant-Couturier lost their seats.

After these two major defeats, the PCF was expected to experience major losses at the 1959 municipal elections. But the opposite happened: revived by the unpopularity of the Pinay-Rueff plan, the PCF won 7 new cities, bringing its total to 31 in Seine-banlieue.

The reinstatement of the majoritarian system from 1959 to 1977 benefited the PCF. In the mid-60's, it formed alliances with the SFIO, which managed to capture 25 of the 39 cities with a population over 30,000 inhabitants.

The strength of the PCF played a central role in the 1964 redistricting of the Ile-de-France region, designed to only leave one General Council to the communists:

Good administration of the territory, the most frequently cited reason for the 1964 redistricting, is not the only reason for it. Political strategy was one of the unofficial arguments that favoured this new departmental map. In the aftermath of the municipal and cantonal elections of 1959, the Communist Party, the leading political force in the Paris agglomeration, was preparing to run for the presidency of the General Council of the Seine, which it had held in 1936 and after the Liberation. After the 1965 municipal elections, the Communist Party led 35 of the 80 municipalities in the Seine suburbs. 1,410,000 suburbanites had a communist mayor. This deep-rooted partisan implantation undoubtedly had a significant impact on the drawing of the new departmental districts in the Paris region. The 1964 law aimed to circumscribe the domination of the Communist Party to the Seine-Saint-Denis department alone, which in 1967 had 21 Communist mayors and held eight of the nine legislative seats of the department. The 1964 division worked; the General Council of Seine-Saint-Denis remained under the communist presidency without interruption from the first cantonal elections of October 1967 to 2008; but the Val-de-Marne, which had been gerrymandered to escape the grip of the communist party, is also presided over by communist elected representatives from 1967 onwards.

This equilibrium functioned until 1977. Despite the considerable progress of the Socialist Party at the National level after the Epinay Congress, voters of the inner suburbs kept favouring municipal communism: there were 46 communist municipalities in the inner suburbs in 1971 - a number that rose to 54 in 1977. In addition, the PCF made new inroads in the outer suburbs, in Poissy, Les Mureaux and Mantes-la-Ville, and confirmed recent wins in cities such as Montereau, Palaiseau or Savigny-sur-Orge. The 1978 legislative elections confirmed that the PCF was the first left-wing party in the Ile-de-France region.

=== Decline (since 1981) ===
Percentage of the Ile-de-France population living in a city run by the Communist Party, 1965-2014.

1977 marked the pinnacle of the Red belt. Its following decline has many causes: first, the communist party rapidly lost influence at the national level in the 1980s, after forming an alliance with the Socialist Party and joining the socialist government after the 1981 elections. While Jacques Duclos, the communist candidate, had received 21.7% of the national vote in the 1969 presidential election, André Lajoinie only obtained 6.8% in 1988.

In Ile-de-France, the party also failed to adapt to the changing demographics of working-class cities. As historian Romain Ducoulombier notes:

To improve the condition of the working-class, a distinctive choice of communist towns was to build large housing projects. But the sociological of such neighborhoods has changed, especially with the arrival of immigrant populations, which did not have the same historical loyalty to the PCF.

In the National Assembly, the decline started as early as 1981: the party lost half of the seats it held (13 out of 27) - a trend confirmed 5 years later with the loss of 4 more seats. After that, the number remained stable until 2002, when it lost 2 more seats in the aftermath of the dismal results of Robert Hue in the presidential election.

In municipal elections, the decline was slower but inexorable: when a city elected a non-communist mayor, it hardly ever made the journey back. As Philippe Subra notes:

In 20 years, the communist party has only captured one city in the Ile-de-France region, Goussainville in 1995, which it lost again to the right six years later; and it has lost 26, including 20 with a population above 20,000: 9 in 1989, 7 in 1995 and 10 in 2001. Among the 16 cities lost in 1989 and 1995, only 2 were ever won back afterwards: Sevran and La Queue-en-Brie.

In the (1988–2004) period, the number of cities held by communists in Ile-de-France went from 67, including 51 with a population over 20,000, to 42, of which 32 have a population above 20,000.

The 2014 municipal elections represented a major defeat for the Communist party: in Seine-Saint-Denis, it lost Bobigny, Saint-Ouen, Bagnolet and Blanc-Mesnil, four cities that it had held for decades. In the Yvelines, it was defeated in Achères, the last city it held in the département. But its most significant setback was the loss of Villejuif, a city that had had a communist since 1925 and in which former communist leader Georges Marchais had been elected to the National Assembly. The communist victories in Montreuil and Aubervilliers appeared as a consolation prize.

The 2020 municipal elections confirmed the slow disappearance of the Red belt: the PCF lost 4 out of 10 cities it held in the département of Val-de-Marne: Villeneuve-Saint-Georges, Choisy-le-Roi, Valenton and Champigny-sur-Marne, but it won back Villejuif. In the département of Seine-Saint-Denis, it lost two of its historical fiefdoms, Saint-Denis and Aubervilliers, but won back Bobigny.

== Symbolism and political significance of the Red belt ==
=== The Red belt as a "laboratory" of communism ===
The idea of a Red belt around Paris is not only an electoral phenomenon. It constitutes, in the words of Annie Fourcaut, "a political myth":

It is first and foremost a strategic and political myth, born in the mid-1920s, shortly after the secession of the Tours Congress, that expresses and distorts the encounter between the newly created communist party (SFIC) and a limited share of the working class in the suburbs of Paris. it is also the organization of working-class communities, through the communist municipalities and their networks of associations, around a revolutionary political project - with strong local roots and the development of popular communities. and finally, it is a social construct that lasts between the 1920s to the end of the 1960s and creates an electoral base for the communist party until the end of the 1970s.

As early as the 1920s, the communist party uses these cities as examples of what it could achieve on the national stage. But the image of a "Red Belt" is also used by political opponents to denounce the dangers that communism would represent at the national level. As Emmanuel Bellanger writes:

Since the 1920s, the "red suburbs" have been a subject of passions. For their adversaries, these French "societized" cities brainwashed the communal youth, diverted public funds for partisan purposes and alienated democracy (...) Wasn't the "capital of French communism", Ivry-sur-Seine, described in 1947 as a "Mecca of red secessionism", picked in 1927 to commemorate with fervor the 10-year anniversary of the 1917 Bolshevik Revolution?

To avoid demonization, communist mayors actually stayed clear from radical changes when they won a city: while their party was often isolated nationally, communist mayors collaborated with their left- and right-wing colleagues. Jacques Girault thus writes:

The election of a communist mayors is not a synonym for radical change. The municipal employees are retained and work alongside a minority or political supporters, hired for their political affinity. Without claiming it, communist mayors take advantage of the legacy of the previous administration, while creating new social functions and extending its network of sympathizers. While denouncing institutions, they benefit from their subsidies to build municipal equipment. They do not reject the tradition of collaboration between mayors, and participate in the rationalisation of municipal administration, most notably by promoting alumni of the ENAM. The way communist mayors exercised their responsibilities, including in times of withdrawal or bolshevization, appears at odds with the radicality of manifestos and partisan articles published in opinion newspapers.

Communist cities are used to demonstrate the benefits of the communist platform, with a strong emphasis on social services, collective housing and taxes paid mostly by corporations. These policies are perceived positively, even by people who are not communist sympathizers at the national level:

From the 1960's onwards, the reflection on municipal communism starts replacing the fantasies born before the Second World War, with the broad acknowledgement that communist mayors properly manage their cities. According to a 1964 IFOP poll, 44% of respondents judge the PCF's local action positively, while only 38% do so at the national level. People underscore the originality of communist management, an element that these cities strongly emphasized: direct taxes mostly paid by companies implanted locally through a tax on the professional use of buildings, reduced indirect taxes, redistributive policies that include low-priced summer camps, cafetarias, patronage and social centers, priority given to schools and social welfare, municipal subsidies to associations that are close to the communist party, strong preference for collective housing.

But this model was largely based on the presence of large factories around Paris, which would bring tax revenues and would need factory workers living nearby. In the 1970s, the deindustrialization of the inner suburbs brought its decline: the Plaine-Saint-Denis, which used to be largest industrial zone in Europe, became an industrial wasteland within years, while Renault-Billancourt closed in 1989:

This powerful movement of deindustrialization and restructuring of the industrial apparatus led to the effacement of the worker as the central figure of society in the Paris suburbs. Of course, there are still workers, but they are less numerous and more often foreigners. And their visibility, their social role has considerably diminished.

=== The Red belt as a springboard for national communist figures ===
These constituencies also provide a springboard to the national stage, as well as safe seats for the leadership of the communist party:

The suburbs of Paris, home to some of the largest communist federations along with Paris, the Pas-de-Calais, the Nord and the Bouches-du-Rhône, hosts 21 of the 33 congresses of the PCF between 1920 and 2006, as well as the great Fête de l'Humanité from 1921 onwards - an event which, for long, relied on the technical services of municipal administration of the communist cities for its logistics. From the 1930s to the 2000s, all the general secretaries of the PCF are elected officials from this political territory: Maurice Thorez is Representative for Ivry from 1932 to his death in 1964; his successor, Waldeck Rochet, sits on the departmental council in Nanterre from 1935 onwards, becomes Representative for Colombes in 1936 and, after a stint in Saône-et-Loire, comes back as Representative for Stains, Aubervilliers and la Courneuve from 1958 to 1973. Georges Marchais is no exception to the tradition of being "airdropped" in a red-leaning city: in 1973, he succeeds to Marie-Claude Vaillant-Couturier.

=== Effects on the urban landscape ===
Because of the emphasis communist cities placed on affordable working-class housing, Red belt cities often present "a certain type of urban landscape, with an alternation of modest individual homes and low-rent collective housing projects, the presence of industrial activities and a particular collective culture and sociability".

One ingredient of this collective culture and sociability is the creation of cultural institutions and, in particular, large public theaters:

The report written by Jacques Duclos for the 1956 Havre Congress, "municipalities at the service of the laboring masses", outlines the traditional priorities: elderly, schools, health, housing, youth. In the 1960s, culture is added to the list. Aubervilliers creates its theater; in 1963, Bernard Sobel, invited by the municipality, creates the Karl-Marx theater in Gennevilliers. Through the partisan use of avant-gardes - Karl-Marx School in Villejuif built by Lurçat in 1933, Culture house of contemporary Seine-Saint-Denis - the suburbs become a testing ground for modernity.

These theaters and cultural institutions are the direct result of the communist municipalities' strategy, in the 1960s and 1970s, to use public commissions to create buildings that represent the idea of architectural modernity: another example is provided by the concrete administrative center of the communist municipality of Pantin, built in 1970 by Jacques Kalisz, a communist architect. In other cities, André Lurçat, Paul Chemetov, Serge Magnien and other modernist architects close to the PCF renovated the suburbs. Georges Valbon, mayor of Bobigny, accepted the renovation of the town according to the standards of slab urbanism: he notably entrusted Oscar Niemeyer with the creation of the departmental labor exchange.

As these suburban cities broke with their communist past, newly elected mayors often tried to mark the change by renaming streets that referred to communist leaders. In Argenteuil, Frédéric Says notes:

A few streets from here, less than 15 years ago, the Général Leclerc Boulevard was called Lenin Boulevard. A little further, the Esplanade de l'Europe has replaced the Esplanade Maurice Thorez. The Marcel Cachin Avenue now honors Maurice Utrillo. The Karl Marx Boulevard is now the only reminder that Argenteuil, the biggest city in Val d'Oise, North-West of Paris, was communist from the end of the second World War to the beginning of the 2000 decade and part of the Red belt that encircled Paris.

== List of cities in the Red belt ==
Based on the départements created in 1964.

The cities whose name is followed by an asterisk have a mayor from the PCF or Front de Gauche since the 2014 municipal elections. Those followed by 2 asterisks (**) have a left-wing majority that includes most of the time the PCF, but which mayor neither belongs to the PCF nor the Front de Gauche.

=== Seine-et-Marne ===
- Brou-sur-Chantereine (1977–2008)
- Champs-sur-Marne* (since 1977)
- Chelles (1935–1939, 1945–1947, 1953–1956 and 1977–1983)
- Compans* (1977–1995 and since 2008)
- Dammarie-les-Lys (1945–1947 and 1959–1983)
- Écuelles** (1977–2000)
- La Ferté-sous-Jouarre (1977–1983)
- Fontenailles (1975–1989)
- Fontenay-Trésigny (1971–1983)
- Mitry-Mory* (1925–1939 and since 1945)
- Montereau-Fault-Yonne (1971–1983)
- Nangis* (1977–2008 and 2012–2020)
- Le Pin (1977–1987)
- Quincy-Voisins (1989–2017)
- Roissy-en-Brie (2008–2014)
- Saint-Mard (1977–1983)
- Varennes-sur-Seine* (since 1959)
- Veneux-les-Sablons (1977–1983)
- Villeparisis (1945–1983)

=== Yvelines ===
- Achères (1925–1939, 1944–1971 and 1977–2014)
- Bois-d'Arcy (1977–1983)
- Carrières-sous-Poissy (1977–1983)
- Chevreuse (1977–1983)
- Les Clayes-sous-Bois (1965–2001)
- Conflans-Sainte-Honorine (1945–1947)
- Fontenay-le-Fleury (1971–1983)
- Gommecourt (1989–2001)
- Guyancourt** (1944–1983)
- Houilles (1977–1989)
- Issou (1971–2001)
- Limay* (since 1971)
- Magnanville* (since 2014)
- Magny-les-Hameaux (1977–1983)
- Mantes-la-Ville (1977–1989)
- Maurepas (1977–1983)
- Les Mureaux** (1977–1989)
- Poissy (1947–1951 and 1977–1983)
- Saint-Cyr-l'École (1920–1939, 1944–2001)
- Sartrouville (1956–1957 and 1959–1989)
- Trappes** (1929–1940 and 1944–2001)
- La Verrière* (1983–2020)

=== Essonne ===
- Athis-Mons (1921–1939, 1944–1947 and 1977–1983)
- Brétigny-sur-Orge (1965–1984)
- Briis-sous-Forges (2001–2016)
- Corbeil-Essonnes (1959–1995)
- Crosne (1945–1947)
- Draveil (1936–1940)
- Épinay-sous-Sénart (1977–1983)
- Étampes (1977–1995)
- La Ferté-Alais (1992–1995)
- Fleury-Mérogis (1959–2009 and since 2019)
- Gometz-le-Châtel (1977–1983)
- Grigny* (1935–1939 and since 1945)
- Igny (1945–1947, 1953–1965, 1977–1989)
- Itteville (1971–1983)
- Janville-sur-Juine** (1971–1983)
- Juvisy-sur-Orge (1945–1947)
- Leuville-sur-Orge** (1977–1989)
- Lisses (1945–1947 and 1965–2001)
- Morsang-sur-Orge* (1944–2020)
- La Norville** (1935–1995)
- Ollainville** (1977–1983 and 1989–2001)
- Palaiseau (1945–1947, 1953–1965 and 1971–1995)
- Paray-Vieille-Poste (1935–1940)
- Pussay** (1959–1983)
- Ris-Orangis** (1944–1947 and 1971–1995)
- Saclas (1945–1988)
- Sainte-Geneviève-des-Bois** (1959–1966 and 1971–1990)
- Saint-Germain-lès-Arpajon (1945–1995)
- Saint-Michel-sur-Orge (1971–1987)
- Saintry-sur-Seine (1934–1939, 1945–1947, 1966–1983)
- Saulx-les-Chartreux* (1959–1989 and 1995–2016)
- Savigny-sur-Orge (1938–1939, 1945–1947 and 1965–1983)
- Vauhallan (1980–1983)
- Verrières-le-Buisson (1945–1947)
- Vert-le-Petit (1977–1983)
- Vigneux-sur-Seine (1935–1939 and 1945–2001)
- Villabé (1945–1989)
- La Ville-du-Bois (1971–1995)
- Villebon-sur-Yvette (1977–1983)
- Villiers-sur-Orge (1977–2001)
- Viry-Châtillon (1925, 1935–1939, 1944–1953)

=== Hauts-de-Seine ===
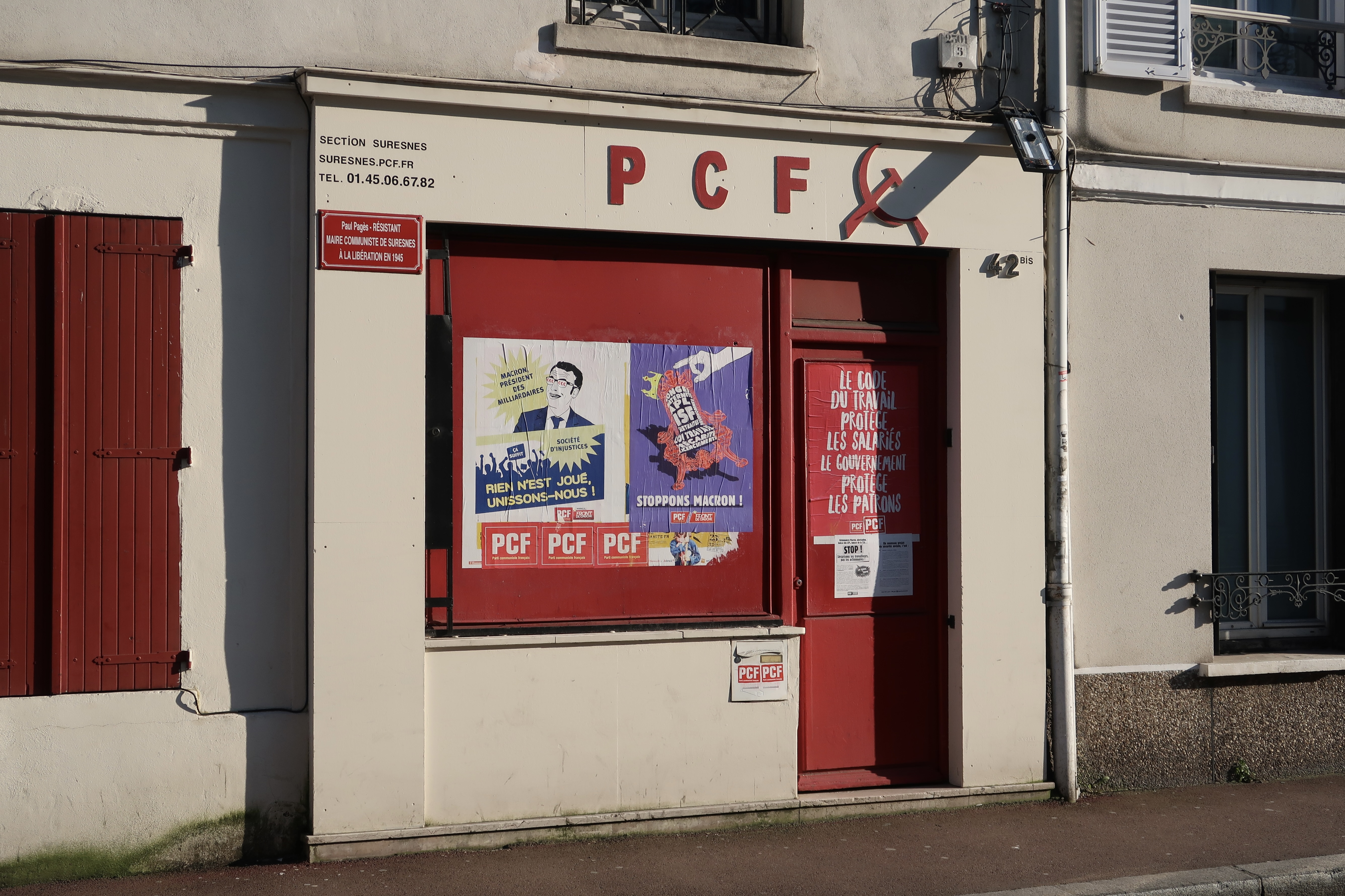
The PCF office in Suresnes.

- Antony (1945–1947, 1977–1983)
- Bagneux* (1935–1939 and since 1945)
- Boulogne-Billancourt (1922–1923)
- Châtillon (1959–1983)
- Chaville (1945–1947)
- Clamart (1935–1941 and 1944–1947)
- Clichy (1925–1929 and 1945–1947)
- Colombes (1935–1939, 1945–1947 and 1965–2001)
- Gennevilliers* (1934–1939 and since 1944)
- Issy-les-Moulineaux (1935–1939 and 1945–1949)
- Levallois-Perret (1946–1947 and 1965–1983)
- Malakoff* (1925–1939 and since 1945)
- Nanterre* (1935–1939 and since 1944)
- Le Plessis-Robinson (1945–1953 and 1956–1989)
- Puteaux (1945–1947)
- Rueil-Malmaison (1938–1939)
- Sèvres (1945–1964 and 1971–1983)
- Suresnes (1945–1947)
- Vanves (1944–1947)
- Villeneuve-la-Garenne (1945–1947)

=== Seine-Saint-Denis ===
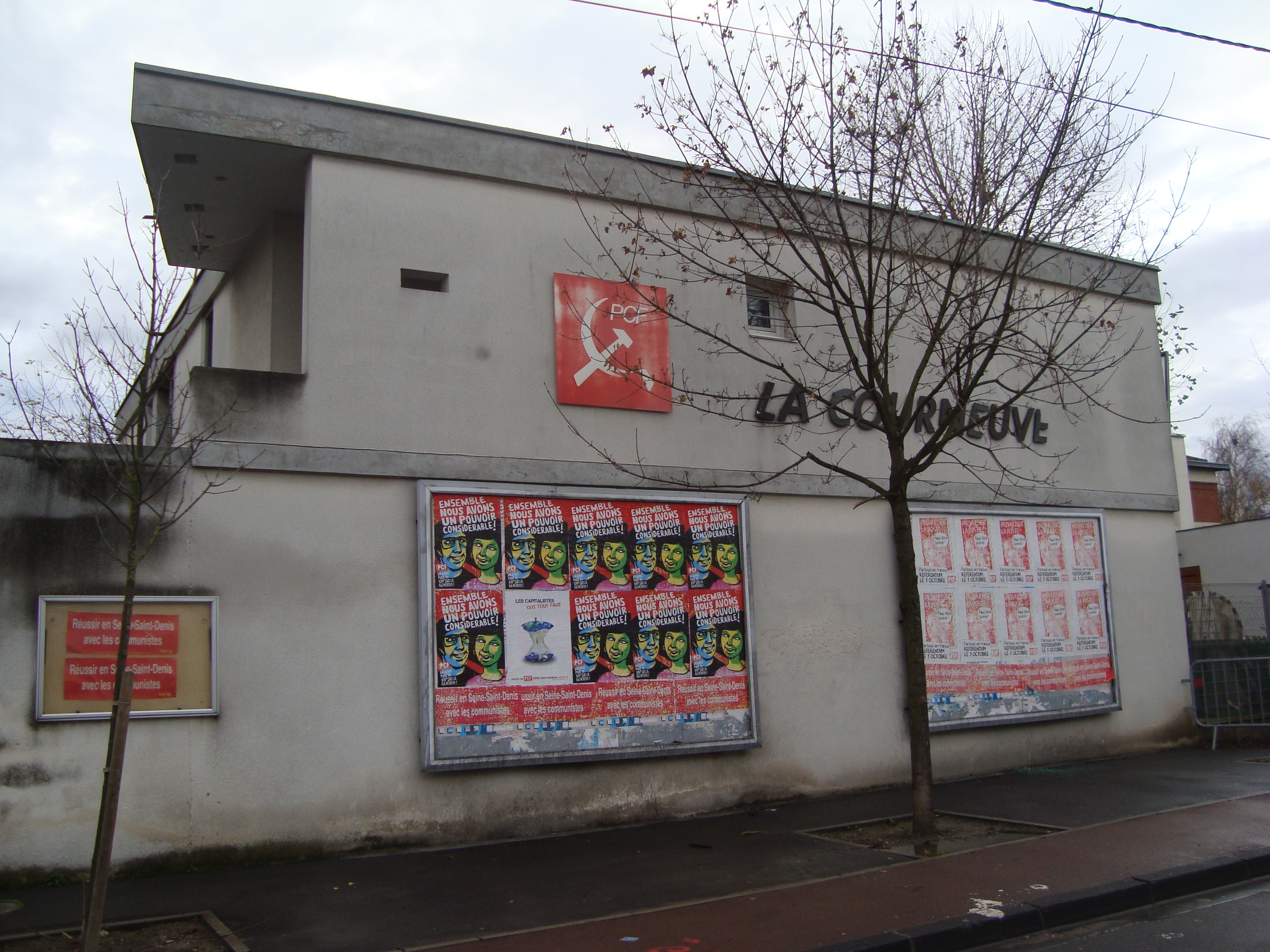
The PCF office in La Courneuve.

- Aubervilliers* (1945–2008 and 2014–2020)
- Aulnay-sous-Bois (1935–1939, 1944–1947 and 1965–1983)
- Bagnolet** (1928–1939 and 1944–2014)
- Le Blanc-Mesnil (1935–1939 and 1944–2014)
- Bobigny (1919–1939, 1944–2014 and since 2020)
- Bondy** (1935–1939)
- Clichy-sous-Bois** (1945–1990)
- La Courneuve* (1944–1947 and since 1959)
- Drancy (1935–1939 and 1944–2001)
- Dugny (1944–1989)
- Épinay-sur-Seine (1935–1940 and 1945–1947)
- Gagny (1977–1983)
- Gournay-sur-Marne (1945–1947)
- L'Île-Saint-Denis** (1947–2001)
- Les Lilas** (1944–1947)
- Livry-Gargan (1945–1947)
- Montfermeil (1945–1983)
- Montreuil* (1935–1939, 1944–2008 and since 2014)
- Neuilly-Plaisance (1977–1983)
- Neuilly-sur-Marne (1935–1939, 1944–1965)
- Noisy-le-Grand (1945–1965 and 1977–1984)
- Noisy-le-Sec (1935–1939, 1944–1947, 1953–2002 and since 2020)
- Pantin** (1944 and 1959–2001)
- Pierrefitte-sur-Seine** (1929–1935 and 1945–2008)
- Romainville** (1935–1939 and 1944–2000)
- Rosny-sous-Bois (1971–1983)
- Sevran** (1977–1995 and 2001–2010)
- Saint-Denis* (1920–1935 and 1944–2020)
- Saint-Ouen (1945–2014)
- Stains* (1935–1939 and since 1945)
- Tremblay-en-France* (1935–1939 and since 1944)
- Villemomble (1944–1945)
- Villepinte (1932–1939, 1977–1984 and 2008–2014)
- Villetaneuse* (1920–1940 and 1945–2020)

=== Val-de-Marne ===
- Alfortville (1929–1939)
- Arcueil** (1935–1939 and 1944–1997)
- Bonneuil-sur-Marne* (1935–1939 and since 1944)
- Champigny-sur-Marne (1950–2020)
- Chevilly-Larue* (since 1977)
- Choisy-le-Roi* (1945–1947 and 1959–2020)
- Fontenay-sous-Bois* (1945–1947 and since 1965)
- Fresnes (1937–1939)
- Gentilly* (1934–1939 and since 1944)
- L'Haÿ-les-Roses (1935–1939, 1945–1947, 1953–1954)
- Ivry-sur-Seine* (1925–1939 and since 1944)
- Joinville-le-Pont (1944–1953 and 1977–1983)
- Limeil-Brévannes (1935–1939, 1944–1953 and 1965–1984)
- Le Kremlin-Bicêtre** (1945–1947)
- Maisons-Alfort (1935–1939, 1944–1947)
- Orly** (1935–1939, 1945–1947 and 1955–1989)
- Ormesson-sur-Marne (1934–1939, 1944–1947)
- La Queue-en-Brie (1977–1983 and 2001–2014)
- Sucy-en-Brie (1945–1946)
- Thiais (1945–1959)
- Valenton (1924–1941 and 1944–2020)
- Villejuif (1925–1939,1945–2014 and since 2020)
- Villeneuve-le-Roi (1935–1939, 1944–1947 and 1965–2001)
- Villeneuve-Saint-Georges (1935–1940, 1945–1957, 1977–1983 and 2008–2020)
- Vitry-sur-Seine* (1925–1939 and since 1944)

=== Val-d'Oise ===
- Argenteuil (1935–1940 and 1945–2001)
- Arnouville (1935–1940 and 1944v1947)
- Bessancourt** (1965–1971 and 1977–1983)
- Bezons* (1920–1940 and 1944–2020)
- Bray-et-Lû (1989–1998)
- Chaumontel (1977–1983)
- Cormeilles-en-Parisis (1945–1947)
- Deuil-la-Barre (1944–1947)
- Écouen (1945–1947)
- Éragny (1947-1965 and 1971–1995)
- Fosses* (since 1977)
- Franconville (1977–1983)
- La Frette-sur-Seine (1977–1983)
- Garges-lès-Gonesse (1944–1995)
- Gonesse (1945–1947)
- Goussainville** (1934–1939, 1945–1983, 1995–2001)
- Marly-la-Ville* (since 1971)
- Méry-sur-Oise (1946–1995)
- Mériel (1977–1980)
- Montigny-lès-Cormeilles (1945–1947 and 1977–2012)
- Montmagny (1965–1983)
- Persan (1945–1995)
- Pierrelaye* (since 1977)
- Piscop (1977–1983)
- Saint-Martin-du-Tertre (1945–1947 and 1959–2014)
- Sannois (1945–1947 and 1955–1959)
- Sarcelles (1965–1983 and 2018)
- Vémars** (1977–1995)
