= God of Bouray =

Celtic bronze statuette

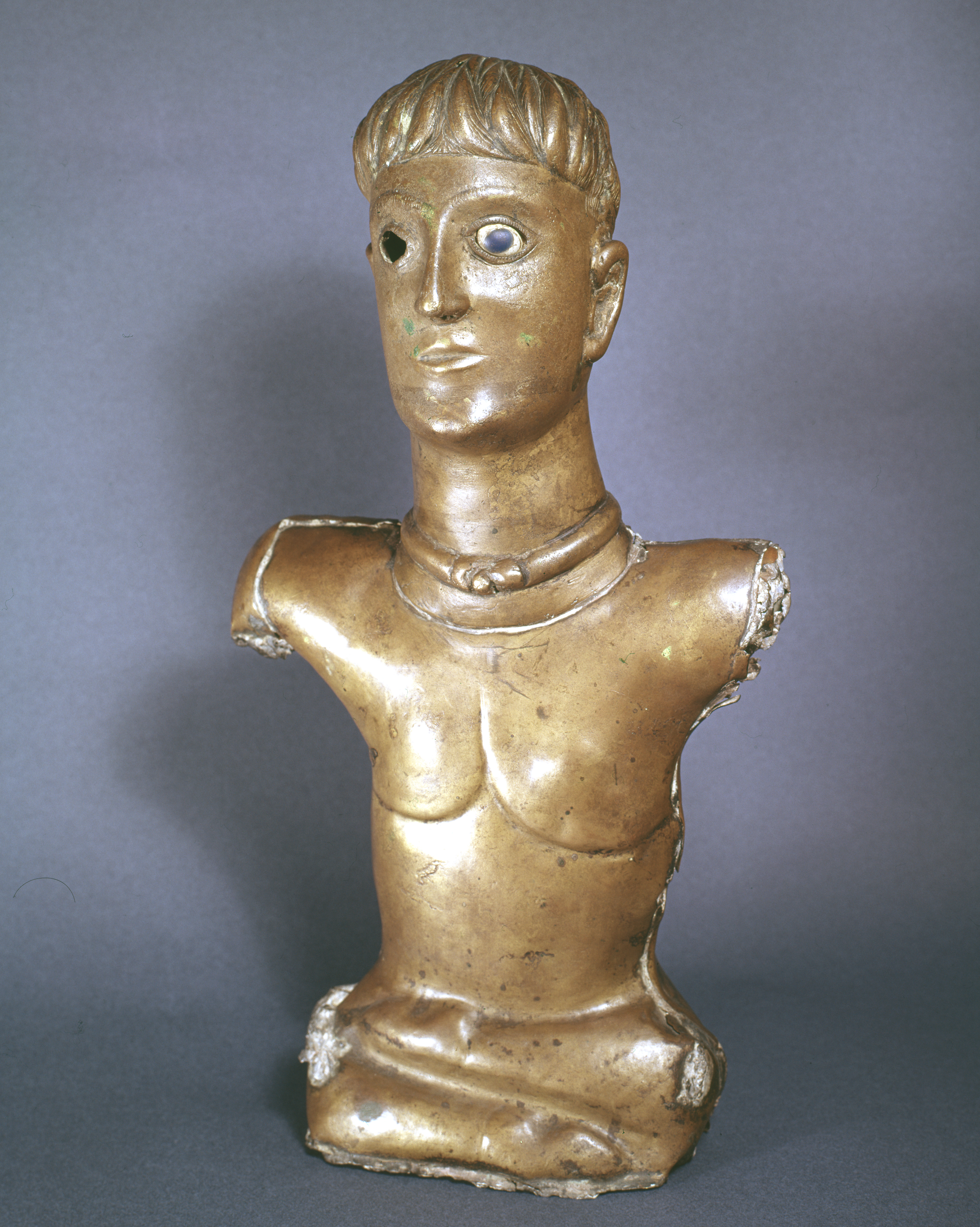
The God of Bouray

The God of Bouray is a Celtic bronze statuette dredged from the River Juine within Bouray-sur-Juine. The statuette is of a cross-legged human figure with an oversized head and hooved feet. It is thought to represent a Gallic god, perhaps the stag-god Cernunnos.

== Discovery ==
The statuette was dredged from the Juine River in 1845, in a portion of the river near the gardens of the Château de Mesnil-Voisin in Bouray-sur-Juine. The statuette was not recognised as an archaeological piece until it was shown to Antoine Héron de Villefosse in 1911. It was obtained by the Musée des Antiquités Nationales in 1933.

== Description ==
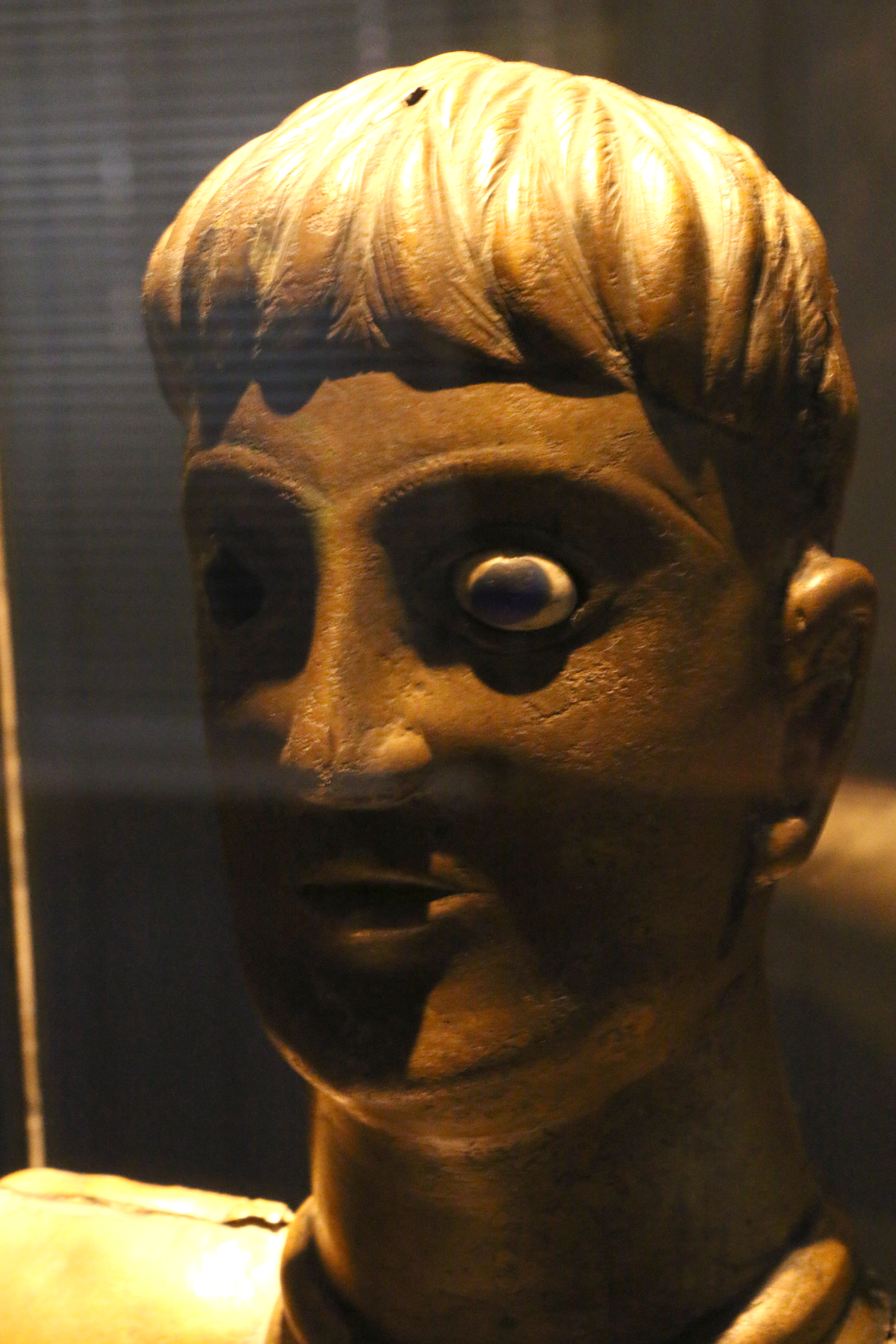
A detail of the face of the God of Bouray

The statuette is hollow and is made of soldered together bronze plates. The lead solder was originally covered up with copper wiring. The figure's torso and legs are made of two bronze plates beaten into shape. Two cylinder-shaped plates probably would have formed the figure's arms, now lost. The two plates forming the head were cast. The left eye is inlaid white-and-blue cast glass; the right eye is missing. On the bottom, there are indications that the statuette was once soldered to a metal base. The statuette is 42 cm (17 in) tall.

The statuette is of a male figure. His whole body is rendered, but his head and neck make up more than half the height of the statuette. The figure's head juts forward slightly. The two plates composing the head have been soldered together behind the ears. The figure's chin projects forward. He has a clasped torc around his neck. The figure is beardless with heavy facial features. His mouth is small and thin-lipped. His nose is long and thin. His eyes are rendered in great detail, with the aforementioned glass insets, striations around the eye socket to represent eyelashes, and great arch-shaped eyebrows. The forehead is covered by a straight, centrally parted fringe. Three layers of hair are rendered on the back of the head, giving the impression of depth.

The lower half of the statuette is marked by decreasing detail as it goes further down. On the front, two low relief quarter-circles on the torso mark the figure's pectorals and small dots render the nipples. The navel is not even marked. On the back, quarter-circles are used to render the shoulder blades and buttocks. The legs are much undersized and somewhat clumsily rendered. They jut out, hiding the figure's pelvis entirely. The legs are crossed in lotus position and end in hooves (described as goat or deer-like). A small part of the figure's upper arm survives. Traces of solder on the figure's legs suggest his hands rested on his knees.

== Dating ==
The date of the statuette is a difficulty. Dates ranging from the 2nd century BC to the 3rd century AD have been proposed, however conventionally the statuette is placed between the 1st century BC and early 1st century AD. The naturalism of the head seems to bear Roman influence and the statuette does resemble pieces from after the Roman occupation of Gaul in 52 BC, (Note: J. V. S. Megaw, for example, compares the statuette to a bronze head of Augustus found near Lyons, certainly Roman but bearing significant Celtic influence (illustrated in Rodenwaldt 1949, Abb. 17)..) but its facial features, seated position, and general disregard for proportions seem more archaic than this. Moreover, Roman statuettes of this size are rarely soldered together from as many individual pieces. Archaeologist Jean-Paul Guillaumet, in classifying Gallic seated figures, complains that the piece has not been securely dated and appears stylistically as "a montage of two pieces from different periods". (Note: Original French: "un montage de deux pièces d'époques différentes".)

== Interpretation ==
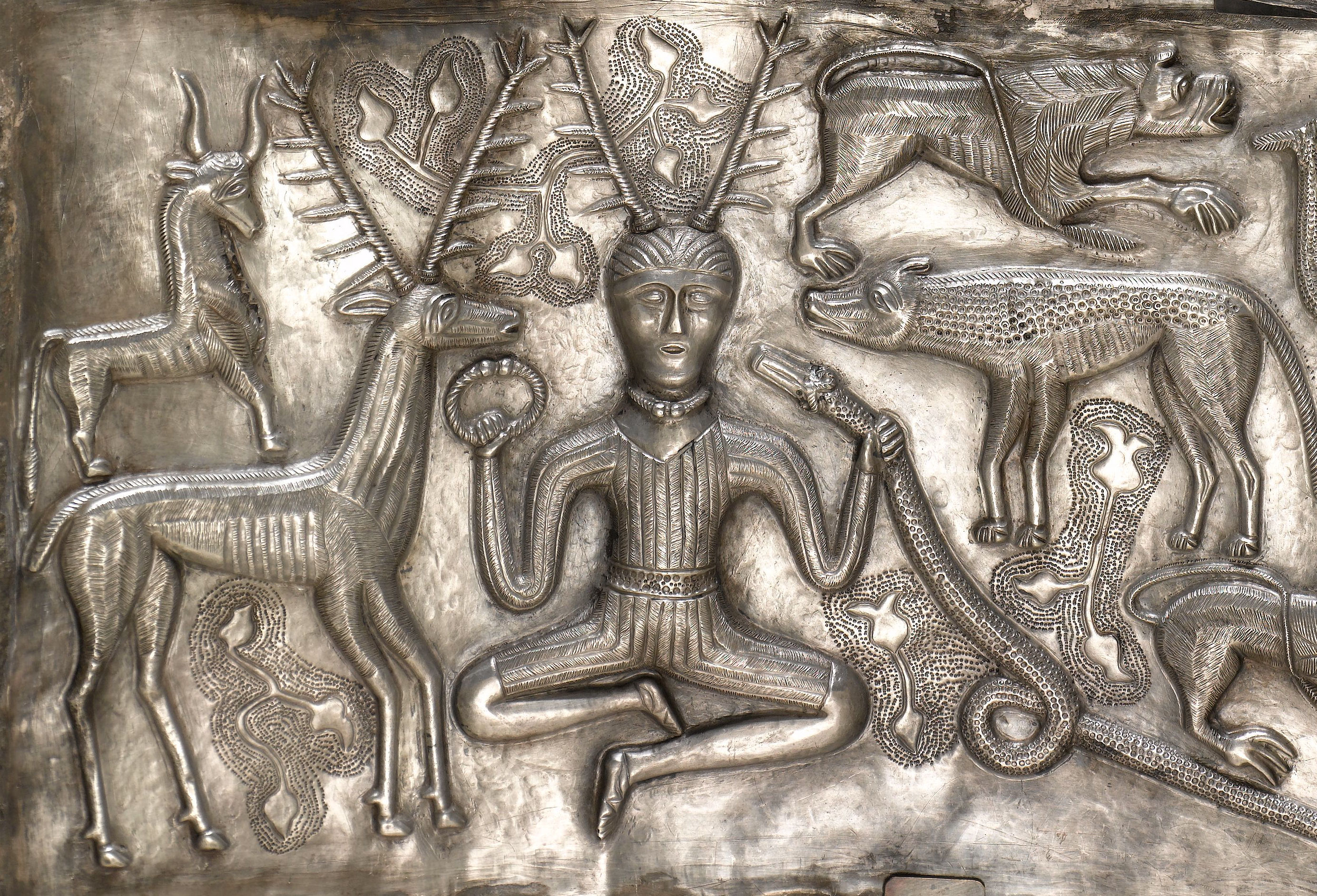
Cernunnos on the Gundestrup cauldron

The nude, hooved figure has been widely received as a Gallic god. Héron de Villefosse recognised the statue as a depiction of a god and drew comparison with the deer-antlered figure on the Gundestrup cauldron, now recognised as a depiction of the Celtic stag-god Cernunnos. Two attributes of Cernunnos, the torc and the crossed legs in lotus position, are represented here. However the statuette lacks the usual antlers. The hooves are perhaps a substitute attribute for antlers; an antlered Cernunnos possesses hooves in a stele found at Beaune. Raymond Lantier and François Braemer are among those who identify the figure with Cernunnos, but Guillaumet is among those unconvinced.

Guillaumet has pushed back on the interpretation of the figure as nude and hooved. He points out that the lack of detail on the torso (and emphasis on the pectorals) are consistent with an anatomical cuirass, though Philip Kiernan rebuts that this interpretation is difficult to reconcile with the buttocks and shoulder blades. Guillaumet has also suggested the hooved-feet are in fact poorly rendered shoes.

== See also ==
- God of Amiens
