= Ceinture =

Ceinture (French, 'belt' or 'girdle', and may refer to a ring road) may refer to:

== Petite ceinture ==
- Chemin de fer de Petite Ceinture, a former circular railway in Paris
- Small Ring, Brussels, the inner ringroad

== Grande ceinture ==
- Grande Ceinture line, a railway line around Paris
- Greater Ring, Brussels, the intermediate ringroad

== See also ==
- Ceintures de Lyon, a former series of fortifications around Lyon, France
- Ceinture fléchée, a French-Canadian colourful sash
- Ceinture noire, a 2018 album by Gims
- Ceinture rouge, communes of the Île-de-France formerly dominated by the French Communist Party
