= Bouray-sur-Juine =

Commune in Île-de-France, France

- Commune
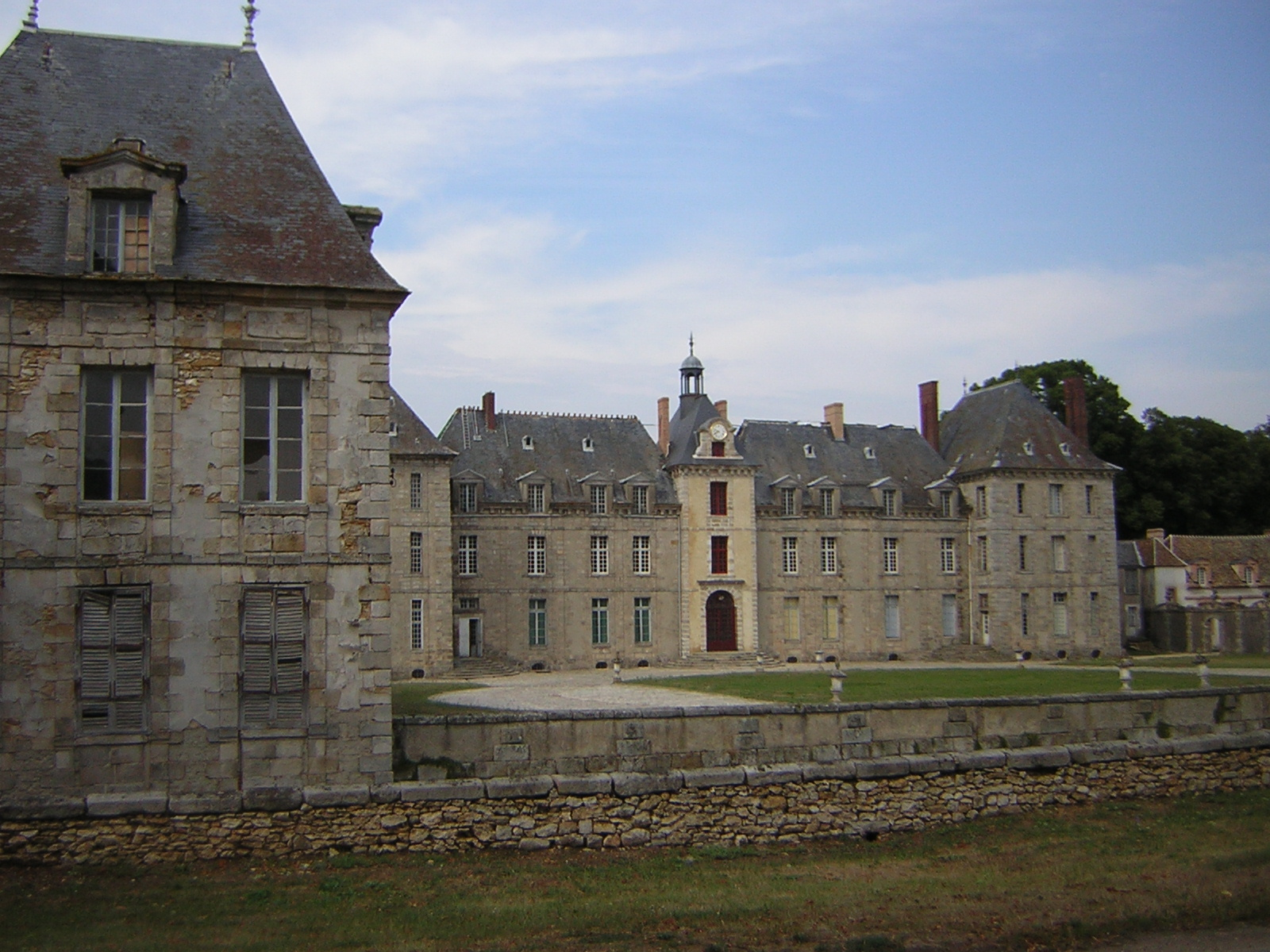
- Château de Mesnil-Voisin

- Coat of arms
- Location of Bouray-sur-Juine
- Location within France Location within Île-de-France (region)
- Coordinates: 48°31′17″N 2°18′01″E
- Country: France
- Region: Île-de-France
- Department: Essonne
- Arrondissement: Étampes
- Canton: Arpajon
- Intercommunality: Entre Juine et Renarde

Government
  - Mayor (2020–2026): Stéphane Galiné
- Area^{1}: 7.23 km^{2} (2.79 sq mi)
- Highest elevation: 139 m (456 ft)
- Lowest elevation: 53 m (174 ft)
- Population (2023): 2,108
  - Density: 292/km^{2} (755/sq mi)
- Time zone: UTC+01:00 (CET)
  - Summer (DST): UTC+02:00 (CEST)
- INSEE/Postal code: 91095 /91850
- ^{1} French Land Register data, which excludes lakes, ponds, glaciers > 1 km^{2} (0.386 sq mi or 247 acres) and river estuaries.

Bouray-sur-Juine (French pronunciation: [buʁɛ syʁ ʒɥin], literally Bouray on Juine) is a commune in the Essonne department in Île-de-France in northern France.

== History ==
The town name is coming from lord Pierre de Bouray in 13th century and Louis de Rabondanges in 16th century, both owner of the Château of Mesnil-Voisin (rebuilt in 17th century).

In 1845, a bronze statuette called the God of Bouray was dredged from the river Juine.

== Geography ==
It is 38 kilometers south west of Paris Notre Dame point zero from road of France, 16 kilometers south west of Évry, 14 kilometers north east of Étampes 5 kilometers north west of La Ferté-Alais, 9 kilometers south east of Arpajon, 14 kilometers south east of Montlhéry, 16 kilometers south west of Corbeil-Essonnes, 18 kilometers south east of Milly-la-Forêt, 20 kilometers south east of Dourdan, 22 kilometers south east of Palaiseau.

== Transports and way links ==
Bouray station, located in the commune of Lardy, is served by RER C trains. Bus from CEAT is taking care of the link between Bouray-sur-Juine, Janville-sur-Juine, Arpajon, Saint-Vrain, Itteville, Marolles-en-Hurepoix and Étampes. The Noctilien is stopping there as well. The village lies on the right bank of the Juine, which forms all of the commune's northern border.

== Population ==
Historical population
Year	Pop.	±% p.a.
1968	758	—
1975	1,459	+9.81%
1982	1,587	+1.21%
1990	1,706	+0.91%
1999	1,867	+1.01%
2007	1,926	+0.39%
2012	2,061	+1.36%
2017	2,184	+1.17%
2023	2,108	−0.59%
Source: INSEE

Inhabitants of Bouray-sur-Juine are known as Bouraysiens in French.

== See also ==
- Communes of the Essonne department
