= Boissy-la-Rivière =

Commune in Île-de-France, France

- Commune
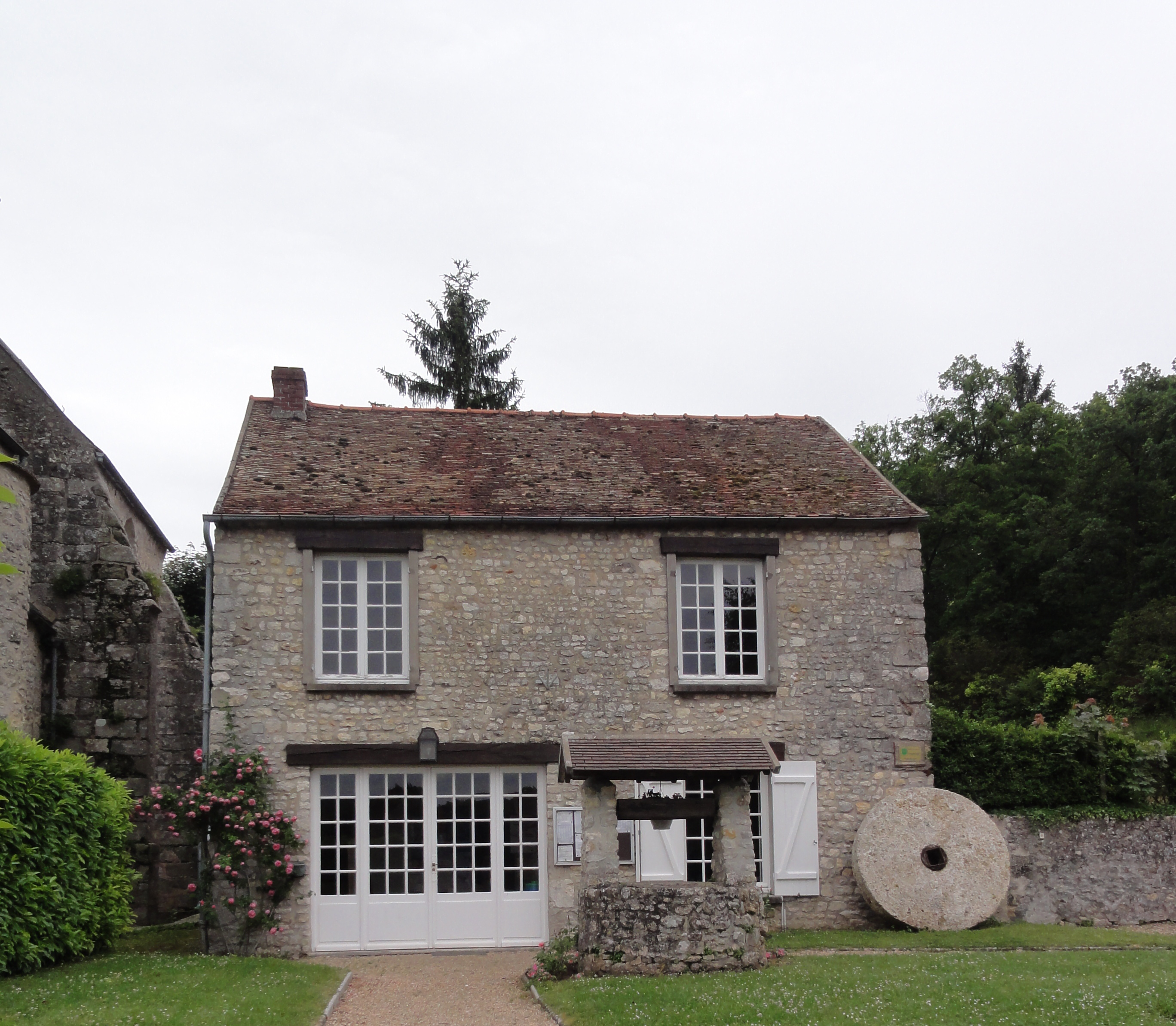
- The town hall of Boissy-la-Rivière

- Coat of arms
- Location of Boissy-la-Rivière
- Location within France Location within Île-de-France (region)
- Coordinates: 48°22′29″N 2°09′16″E
- Country: France
- Region: Île-de-France
- Department: Essonne
- Arrondissement: Étampes
- Canton: Étampes
- Intercommunality: CA Étampois Sud Essonne

Government
  - Mayor (2020–2026): Dominique Leroux
- Area^{1}: 12.47 km^{2} (4.81 sq mi)
- Highest elevation: 147 m (482 ft)
- Lowest elevation: 70 m (230 ft)
- Population (2023): 550
  - Density: 44/km^{2} (110/sq mi)
- Demonym: Buccussiens
- Time zone: UTC+01:00 (CET)
  - Summer (DST): UTC+02:00 (CEST)
- INSEE/Postal code: 91079 /91690
- ^{1} French Land Register data, which excludes lakes, ponds, glaciers > 1 km^{2} (0.386 sq mi or 247 acres) and river estuaries.

Boissy-la-Rivière (French pronunciation: [bwasi la ʁivjɛʁ]; lit. 'Boissy-the-River') is a rural commune in the Essonne department in Île-de-France in northern France.

== Geography ==
The village lies on the right bank of the Juine, which forms most of the commune's western border.

Inhabitants of Boissy-la-Rivière are known as Buccussiens.

== See also ==
- Communes of the Essonne department
