= Autruy-sur-Juine =

- Commune
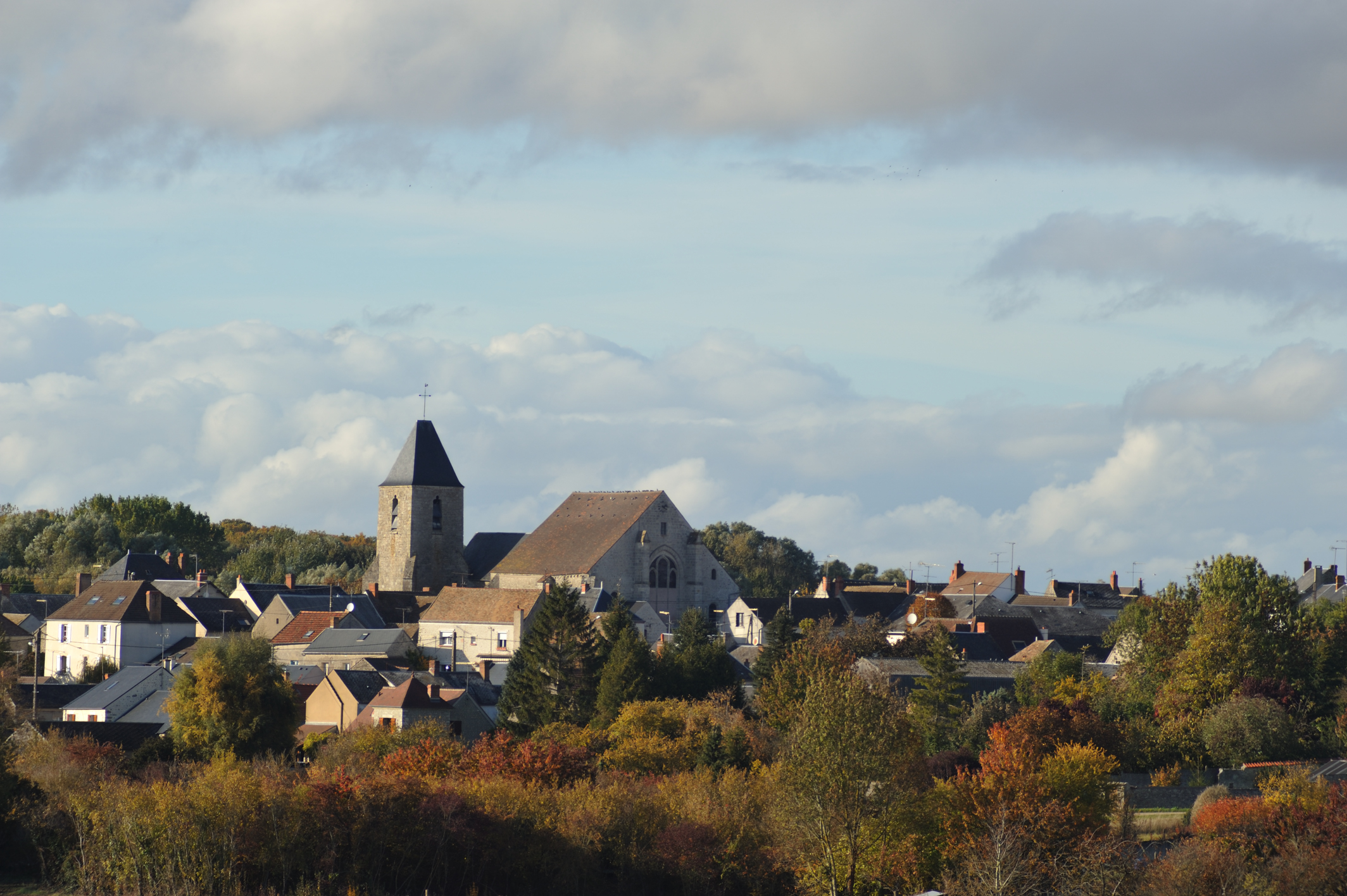
- A general view of Autruy-sur-Juine

- Coat of arms
- Location of Autruy-sur-Juine
- Location within France Location within Centre-Val de Loire
- Coordinates: 48°16′35″N 2°06′10″E
- Country: France
- Region: Centre-Val de Loire
- Department: Loiret
- Arrondissement: Pithiviers
- Canton: Pithiviers
- Intercommunality: CC Pithiverais

Government
  - Mayor (2020–2026): Christophe Guerton
- Area^{1}: 27.11 km^{2} (10.47 sq mi)
- Highest elevation: 137 m (449 ft)
- Lowest elevation: 92 m (302 ft)
- Population (2023): 745
  - Density: 27.5/km^{2} (71.2/sq mi)
- Time zone: UTC+01:00 (CET)
  - Summer (DST): UTC+02:00 (CEST)
- INSEE/Postal code: 45015 /45480
- ^{1} French Land Register data, which excludes lakes, ponds, glaciers > 1 km^{2} (0.386 sq mi or 247 acres) and river estuaries.

Autruy-sur-Juine (French pronunciation: [otʁɥi syʁ ʒɥin], literally Autruy on Juine) is a commune in the Loiret department in north-central France.

== Geography ==
The commune is traversed by the river Juine.

== Population ==
Historical population
| Year | Pop. | ±% p.a. |
|---|---|---|
| 1968 | 549 | — |
| 1975 | 636 | +2.12% |
| 1982 | 703 | +1.44% |
| 1990 | 817 | +1.90% |
| 1999 | 810 | −0.10% |
| 2007 | 741 | −1.11% |
| 2012 | 704 | −1.02% |
| 2017 | 688 | −0.46% |
| 2023 | 745 | +1.34% |
Source: INSEE

== See also ==
- Communes of the Loiret department
