= Saint-Cyr-la-Rivière =

Commune in Île-de-France, France

- Commune
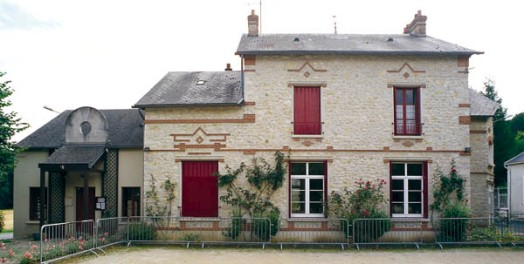
- The school and town hall in Saint-Cyr-la-Rivière

- Coat of arms
- Location of Saint-Cyr-la-Rivière
- Location within France Location within Île-de-France (region)
- Coordinates: 48°21′17″N 2°08′53″E
- Country: France
- Region: Île-de-France
- Department: Essonne
- Arrondissement: Étampes
- Canton: Étampes
- Intercommunality: CA Étampois Sud Essonne

Government
  - Mayor (2020–2026): Christèle Deloison
- Area^{1}: 8.81 km^{2} (3.40 sq mi)
- Highest elevation: 146 m (479 ft)
- Lowest elevation: 72 m (236 ft)
- Population (2023): 466
  - Density: 52.9/km^{2} (137/sq mi)
- Demonym: Saint-Cyriens
- Time zone: UTC+01:00 (CET)
  - Summer (DST): UTC+02:00 (CEST)
- INSEE/Postal code: 91544 /91690
- ^{1} French Land Register data, which excludes lakes, ponds, glaciers > 1 km^{2} (0.386 sq mi or 247 acres) and river estuaries.

Saint-Cyr-la-Rivière (French pronunciation: [sɛ̃ siʁ la ʁivjɛʁ]; lit. 'St Cyr-the-River') is a rural commune in the Essonne department in Île-de-France in northern France.

Inhabitants of Saint-Cyr-la-Rivière are known as Saint-Cyriens (masculine) and Saint-Cyriennes (feminine) in French.

== Geography ==
The village lies on the left bank of the Éclimont, which forms the commune's northeastern border and flows into the Juine, which flows northeast through the northwestern part of the commune.

== See also ==
- Communes of the Essonne department
