= Saint-Vrain, Essonne =

Commune in Île-de-France, France

Saint-Vrain
- Commune
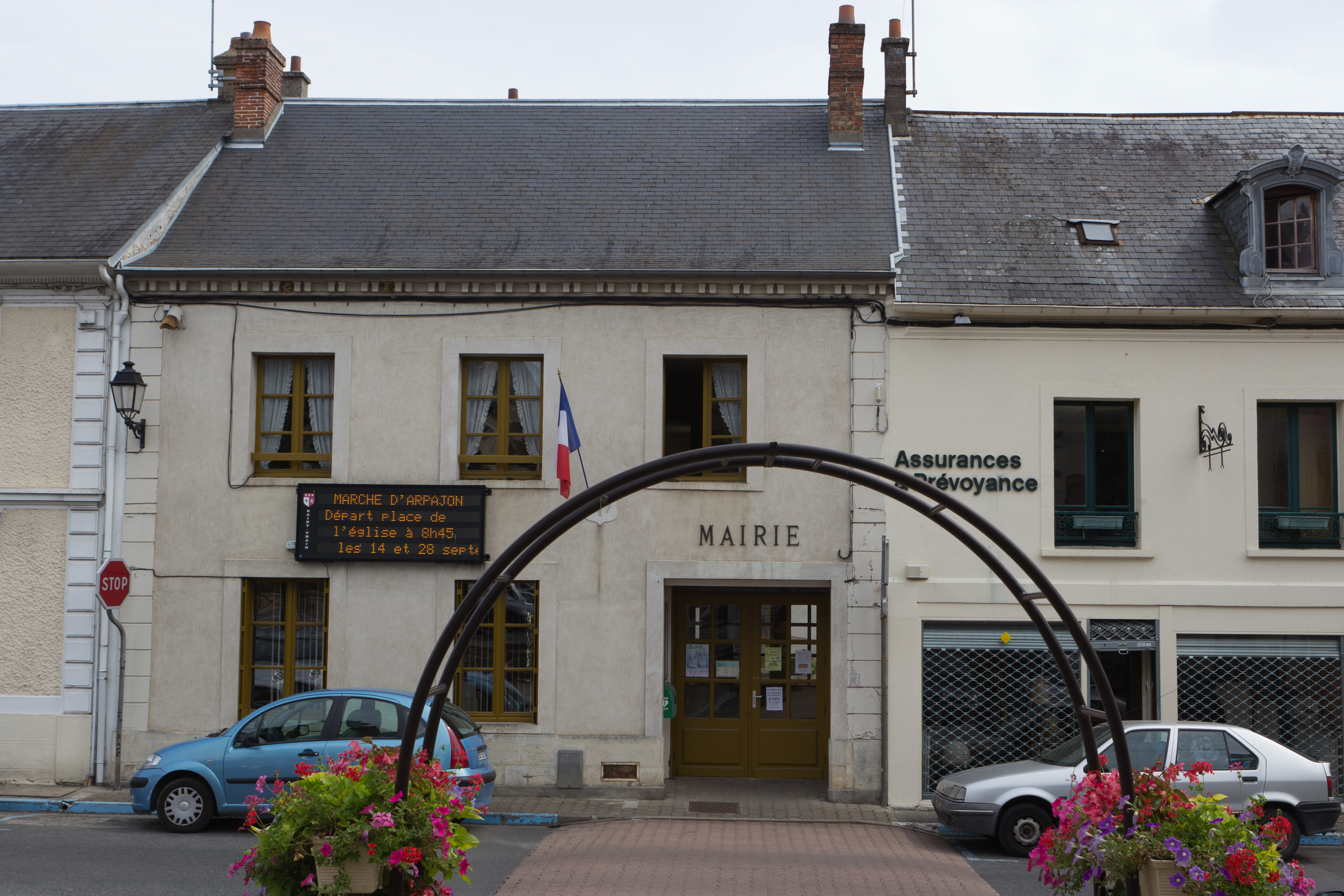
- The town hall in Saint-Vrain

- Coat of arms
- Location of Saint-Vrain
- Location within France Location within Île-de-France (region)
- Coordinates: 48°32′27″N 2°20′00″E
- Country: France
- Region: Île-de-France
- Department: Essonne
- Arrondissement: Palaiseau
- Canton: Brétigny-sur-Orge
- Intercommunality: Val d'Essonne

Government
  - Mayor (2020–2026): Corinne Cordier
- Area^{1}: 11.57 km^{2} (4.47 sq mi)
- Highest elevation: 83 m (272 ft)
- Lowest elevation: 51 m (167 ft)
- Population (2023): 3,089
  - Density: 267.0/km^{2} (691.5/sq mi)
- Time zone: UTC+01:00 (CET)
  - Summer (DST): UTC+02:00 (CEST)
- INSEE/Postal code: 91579 /91770
- ^{1} French Land Register data, which excludes lakes, ponds, glaciers > 1 km^{2} (0.386 sq mi or 247 acres) and river estuaries.

Saint-Vrain (French pronunciation: [sɛ̃ vʁɛ̃]) is a commune in the Essonne department in Île-de-France in northern France.

Since 2001, Thaxted (Essex, England) has been twinned with Saint-Vrain. A twinning association aims to promote friendship and cultural understanding and to foster the relationship between the two towns and their people.

== Geography ==
The Juine forms the commune's southeastern border.

== Population ==
Historical population
Year	Pop.	±% p.a.
1968	1,473	—
1975	2,104	+5.23%
1982	2,295	+1.25%
1990	2,307	+0.07%
1999	2,800	+2.18%
2007	2,791	−0.04%
2012	2,921	+0.91%
2017	3,059	+0.93%
2023	3,089	+0.16%
Source: INSEE

Inhabitants of Saint-Vrain are known as Saint-Vrainois in French.

== Structures and monuments ==
A castle with a historic zoological park (with reconstructions of prehistoric scenes) is located here, but has been closed to the public since 1998. The town also has a Louis XV-era obelisk and a thirteenth-century church.

== See also ==
- Communes of the Essonne department
