= Bouray station =

Railway station in Lardy, France

Bouray
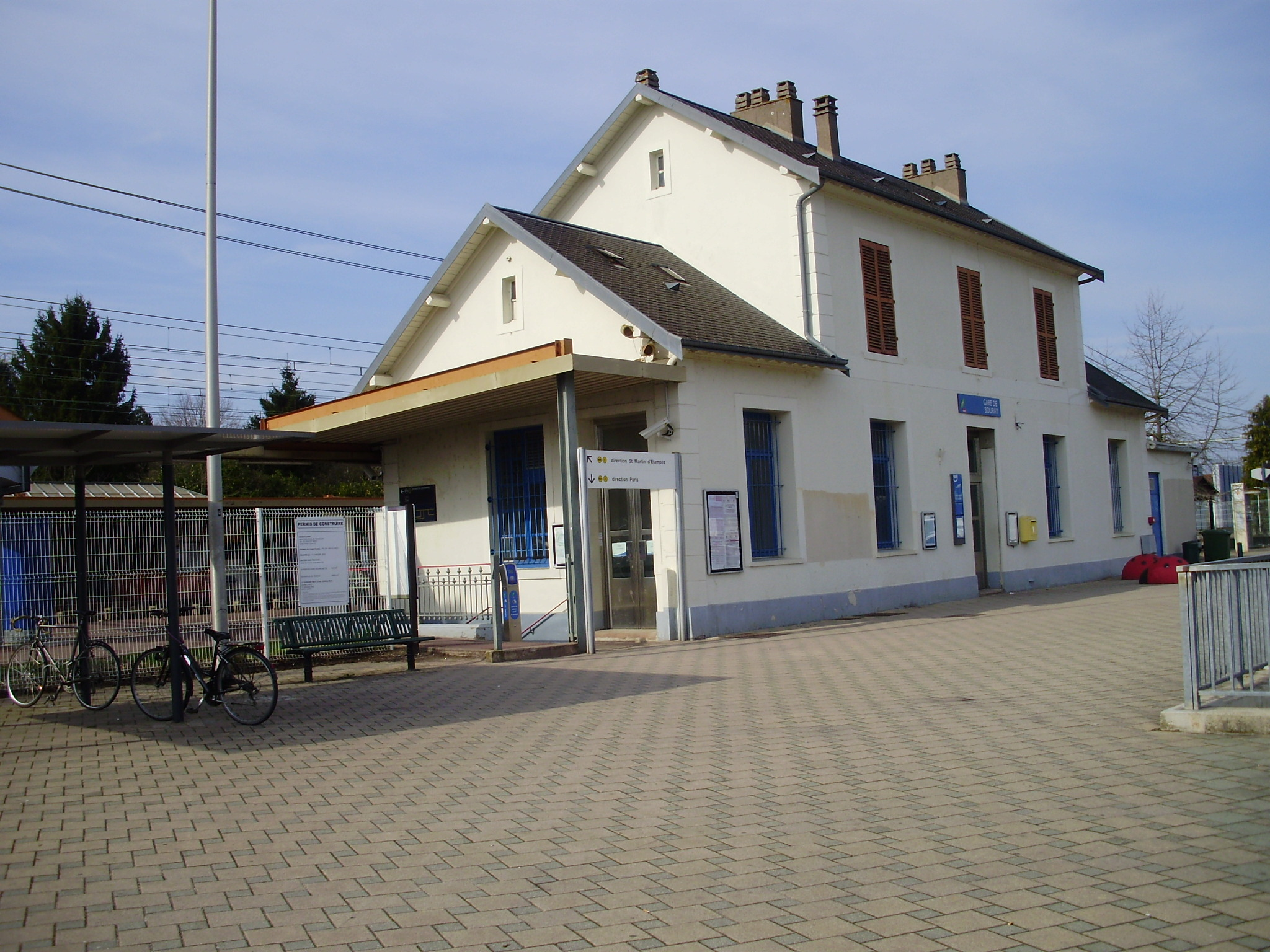
- Bouray railway station

General information
- Location: Lardy, Essonne, Île-de-France, France
- Coordinates: 48°31′59″N 2°17′26″E
- Line: Paris–Bordeaux railway
- Platforms: 2
- Tracks: 4

Other information
- Station code: 87545178
- Fare zone: 5

History
- Opened: 5 May 1843

Passengers
- 2024: 1,430,936

Services
Preceding station	RER	Following station
Marolles-en-Hurepoix towards Saint-Quentin-en-Yvelines	RER C	Lardy towards Saint-Martin-d'Étampes
Location

Bouray is a railway station in Lardy and near Bouray-sur-Juine, Essonne, Paris, France. The station was opened in 1843 and is on the Paris–Bordeaux railway. The station is served by Paris' express suburban rail system, the RER. The train services are operated by SNCF.

== Train services ==
The following services serve the station:

- Local services (RER C) Saint-Martin d'Étampes–Juvisy–Paris–Issy–Versailles-Chantiers–Saint-Quentin-en-Yvelines

== See also ==
- List of stations of the Paris RER
