= Juine =

River in France

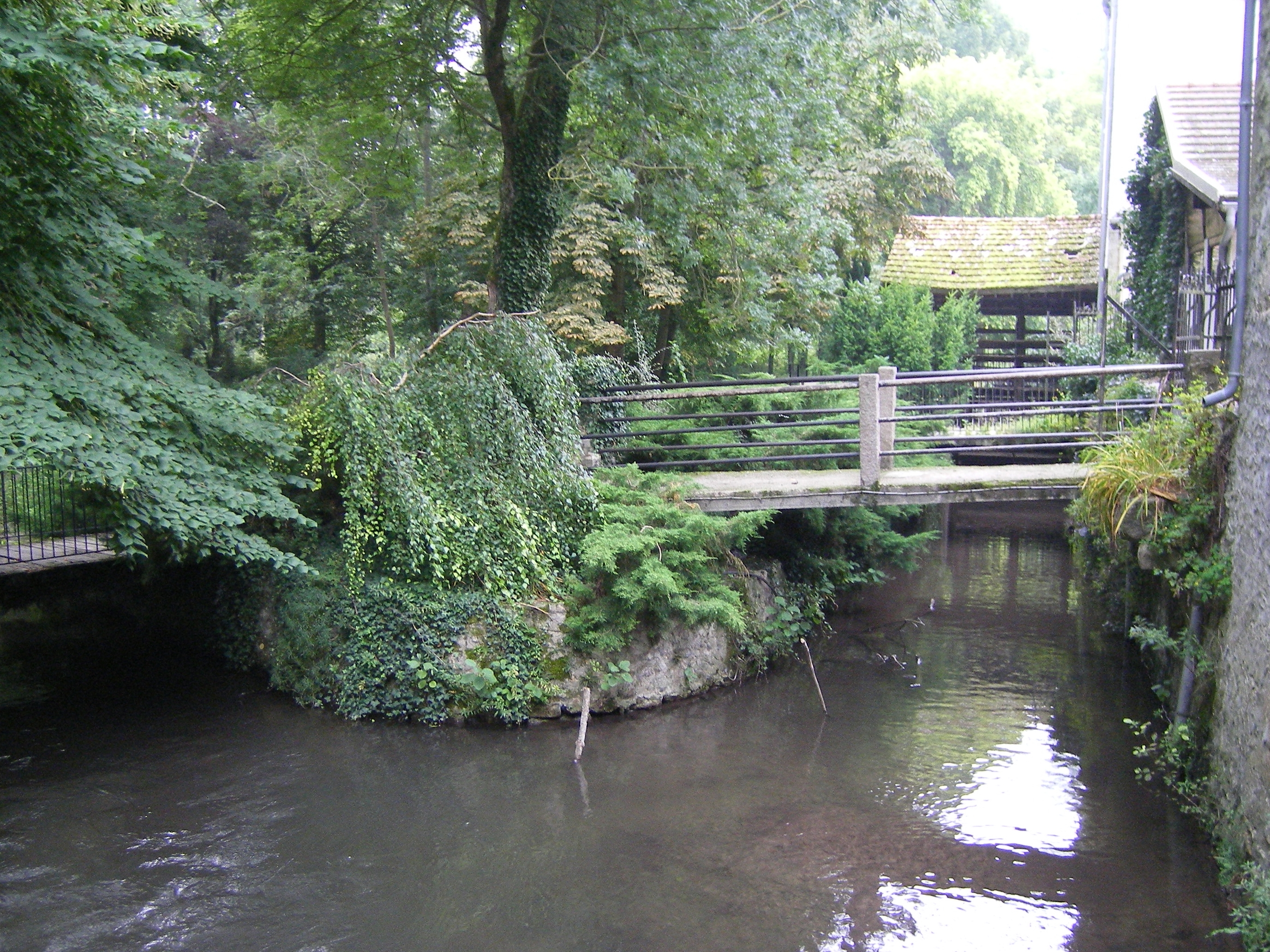
- The Juine in Lendreville (Ormoy-la-Rivière)

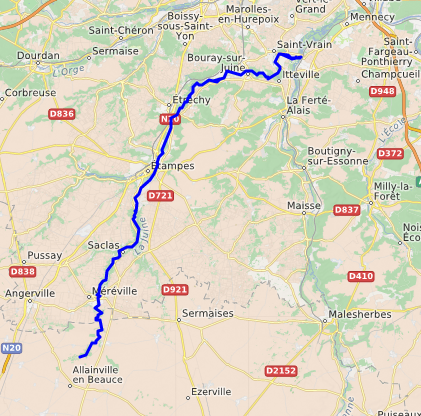

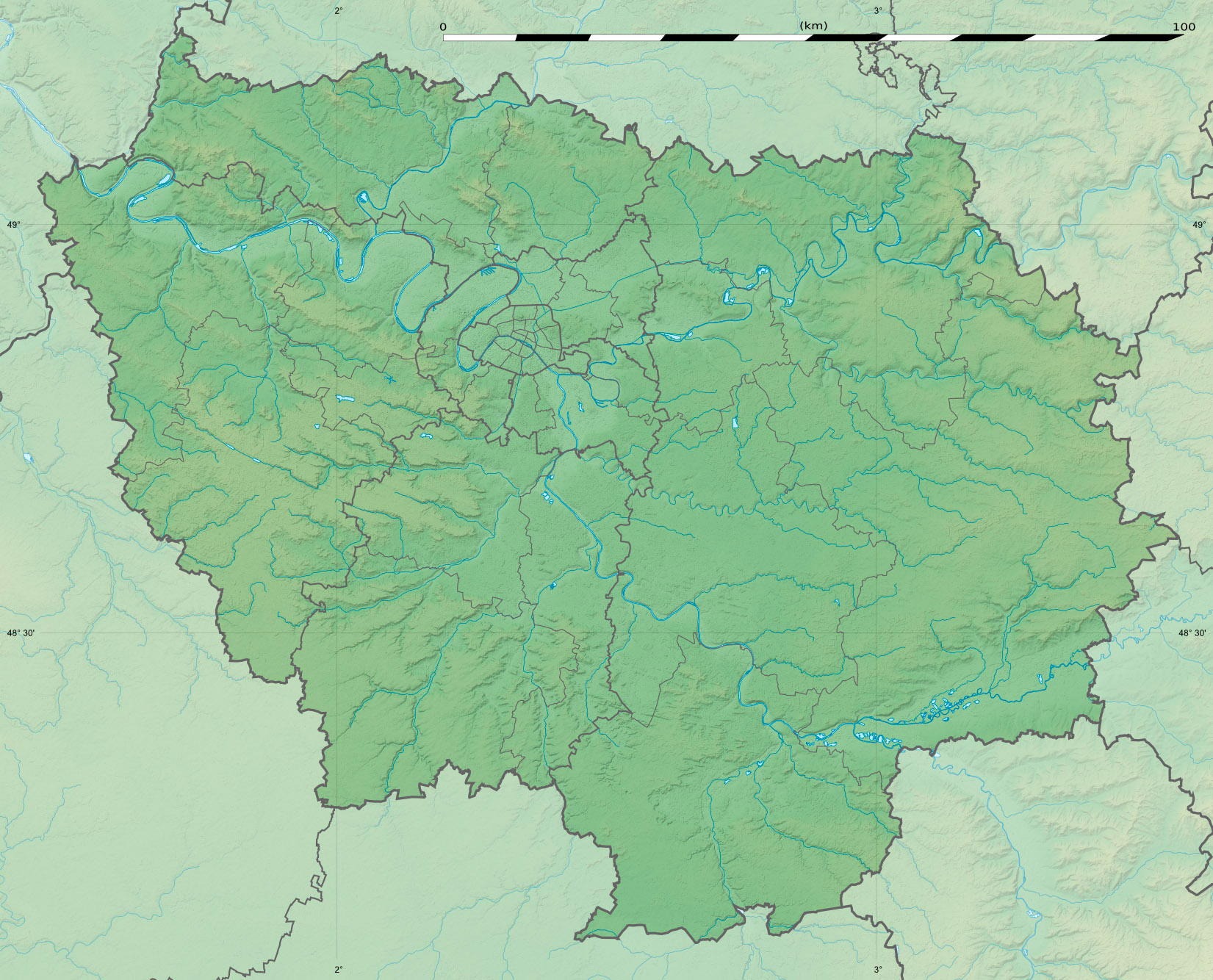
- Location within France Location within Île-de-France (region)

Location
- Country: France

Physical characteristics
- Source
  - location: Forest of Chambaudoin
  - coordinates: 48°15′46″N 2°04′12″E
  - elevation: 110 m (360 ft)
- Mouth
  - location: Essonne
  - coordinates: 48°32′12″N 2°22′20″E
  - elevation: 46 m (151 ft)
- Length: 53 km (33 mi)

Basin features
- Progression: Essonne→ Seine→ English Channel

The Juine (French pronunciation: [ʒɥin]) is a French river, 53 kilometres (33 mi) long. It is a left tributary of the river Essonne.

Its source is in Loiret, in the forest of Chambaudoin, less than 3 km south-west from Autruy-sur-Juine. Its name originates in the hamlet of Juines which it runs alongside before re-entering the Essonne department, in which it runs through several communes: Méréville, Saint-Cyr-la-Rivière, Ormoy-la-Rivière, Étampes, Étréchy, Chamarande, Janville-sur-Juine, Bouray-sur-Juine, Lardy.

It also runs through the parks of several châteaux (Saint-Vrain, Chamarande, and Mesnil-Voisin) and once served several now-abandoned mills. From the 15th to the 18th century, it combined with the Essonne and Seine rivers to form a navigable waterway for flat-bottomed boats carrying wheat from Beauce towards Paris. It joins the river Essonne between Itteville and Vert-le-Petit, near Ballancourt-sur-Essonne.

== Communes it runs through ==
In Loiret
Autruy-sur-Juine

In Essonne
Méréville ~ Saclas ~ Saint-Cyr-la-Rivière ~ Boissy-la-Rivière ~ Ormoy-la-Rivière ~ Étampes ~ Morigny-Champigny ~ Étréchy ~ Auvers-Saint-Georges ~ Chamarande ~ Lardy ~ Janville-sur-Juine ~ Bouray-sur-Juine ~ Saint-Vrain ~ Itteville ~ Vert-le-Petit

== Tributaries ==
- The 7.7-kilometre (4.8 mi) river Eclimon, whose source is at Abbéville-la-Rivière and which runs into the Juine level with Boissy-la-Rivière
- The 4.4-kilometre (2.7 mi) la Marette stream - source at Guillerval, flows into the Juine at Saclas
- The river Chalouette - source at Chalou-Moulineux, flows into the Juine level with Étampes
