= Saclas =

Commune in Île-de-France, France

- Commune
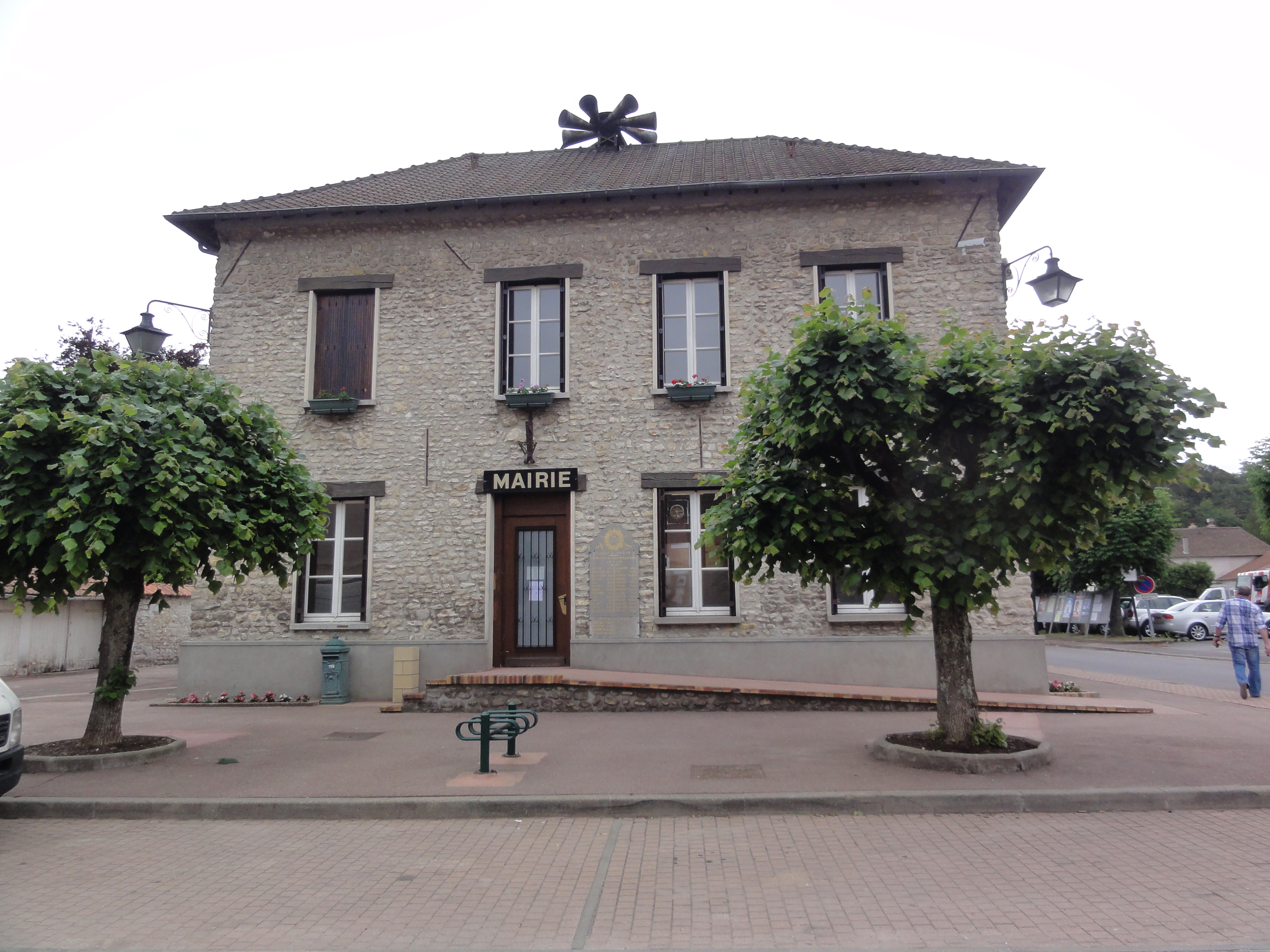
- The town hall in Saclas

- Coat of arms
- Location of Saclas
- Location within France Location within Île-de-France (region)
- Coordinates: 48°21′39″N 2°07′33″E
- Country: France
- Region: Île-de-France
- Department: Essonne
- Arrondissement: Étampes
- Canton: Étampes
- Intercommunality: CA Étampois Sud Essonne

Government
  - Mayor (2020–2026): Yves Gaucher
- Area^{1}: 13.66 km^{2} (5.27 sq mi)
- Highest elevation: 147 m (482 ft)
- Lowest elevation: 72 m (236 ft)
- Population (2023): 1,819
  - Density: 133.2/km^{2} (344.9/sq mi)
- Time zone: UTC+01:00 (CET)
  - Summer (DST): UTC+02:00 (CEST)
- INSEE/Postal code: 91533 /91690
- ^{1} French Land Register data, which excludes lakes, ponds, glaciers > 1 km^{2} (0.386 sq mi or 247 acres) and river estuaries.

Saclas (French pronunciation: [sakla]) is a commune in the Essonne department in Île-de-France in northern France.

Inhabitants of Saclas are known as Saclasiens.

== Geography ==
The Juine flows northeastward through the middle of the commune and crosses the village.

== See also ==
- Communes of the Essonne department
