= Château de Mesnil-Voisin =

Coordinates: 48°31′13″N 2°16′33″E

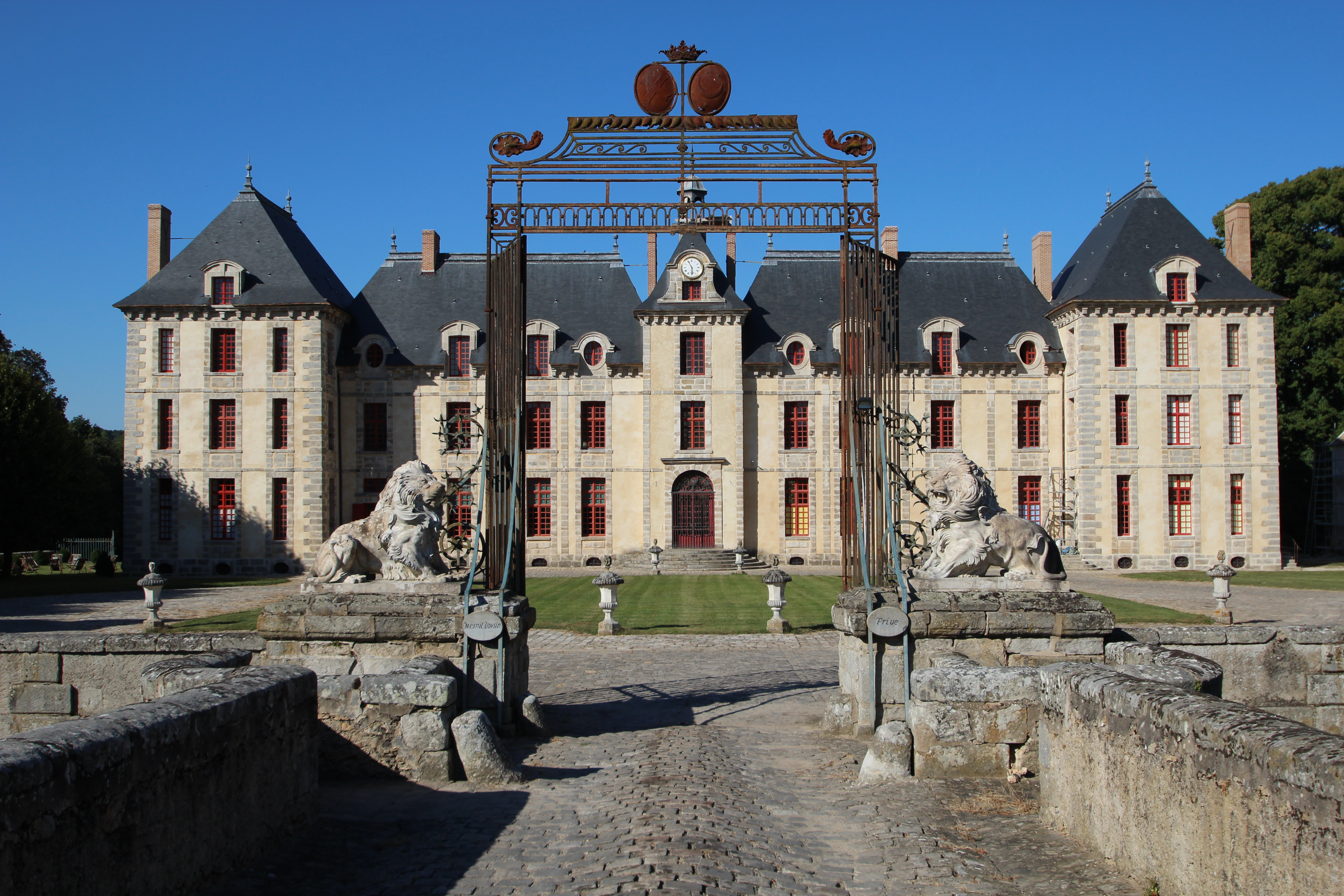
The main façade of the Château de Mesnil-Voisin.

The château de Mesnil-Voisin is a French château, located at the heart of the hamlet of "Mesnil-Voisin" in the commune of Bouray-sur-Juine in the department of Essonne.

Le château was built by Michel Villedo, one of the famous "Maçons de la Creuse". It has an orangery, kitchens, coach houses and workshops. At the centre of its communal courtyard a huge dovecote with 3000 niches and a wood-framed roof, and topped by a conical turret – it is rare in having its moveable internal staircase still intact.

The course of a canal bordering the rear of the château was entirely removed between 1999 and 2001. It has thus returned to its original course, leaving the Juine a short distance upstream of the château and rejoining it some distance downstream, just before the pont de Cochet.

== Gallery ==
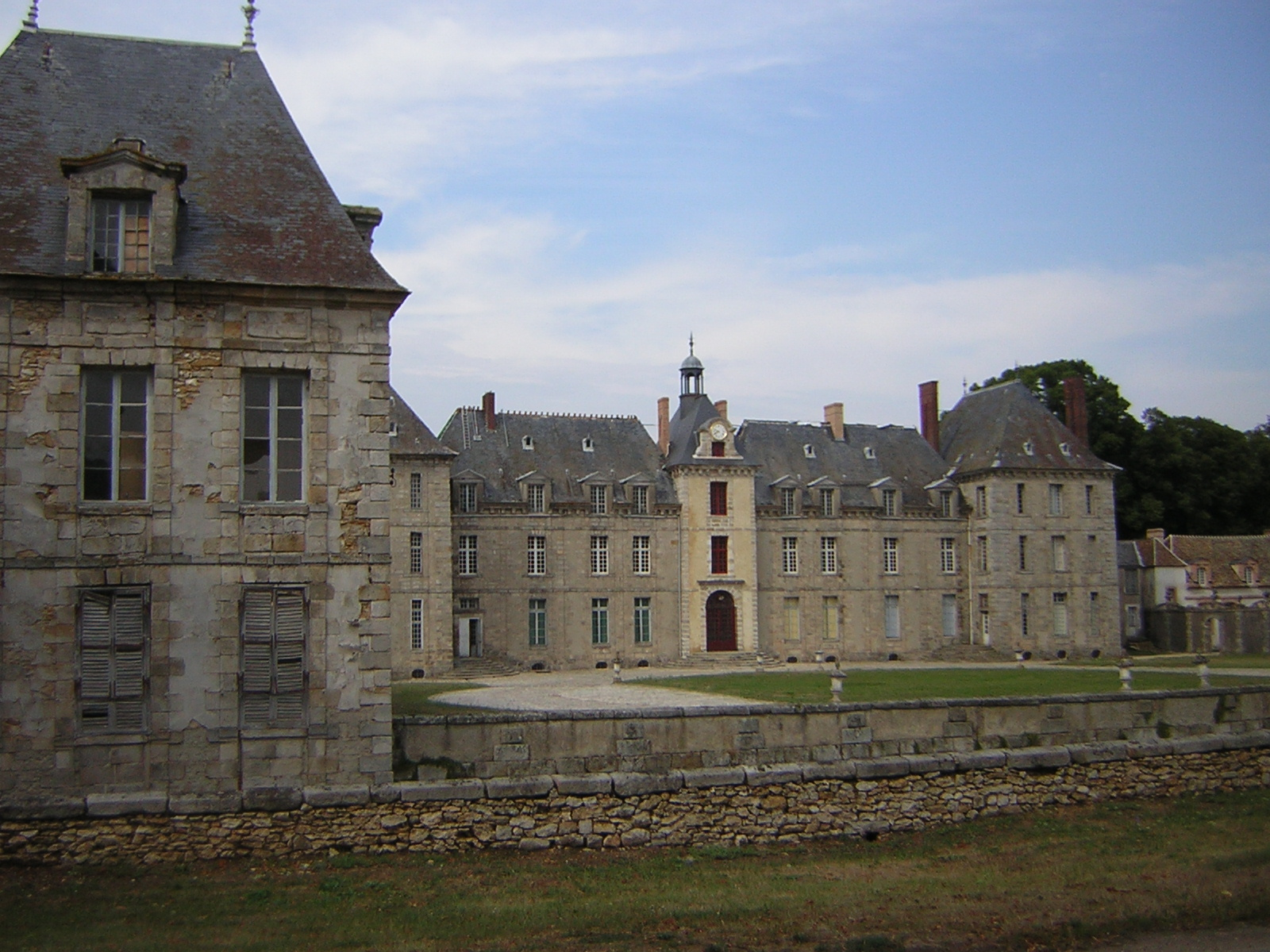
The western facade

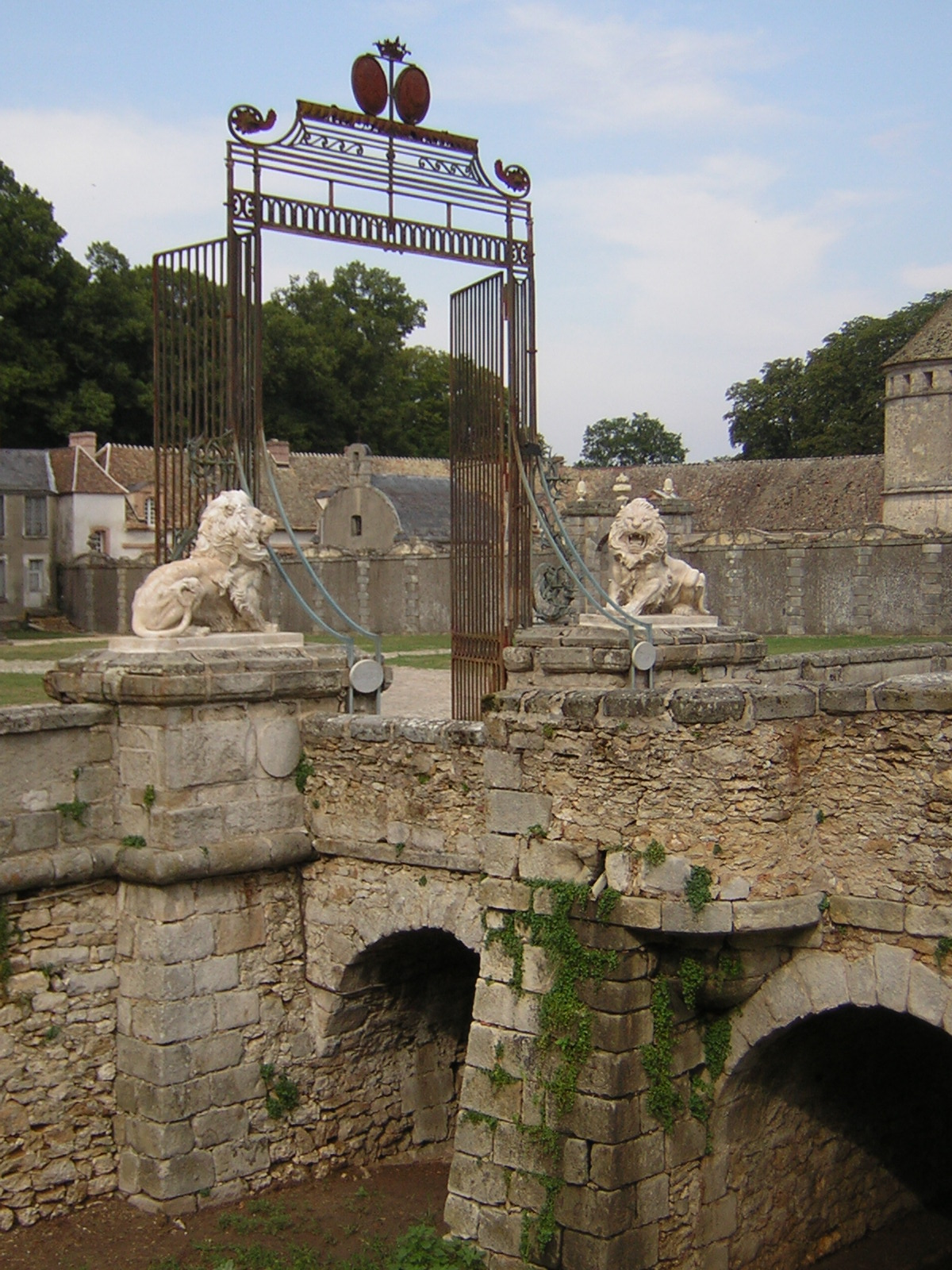
Entrance from the exterior

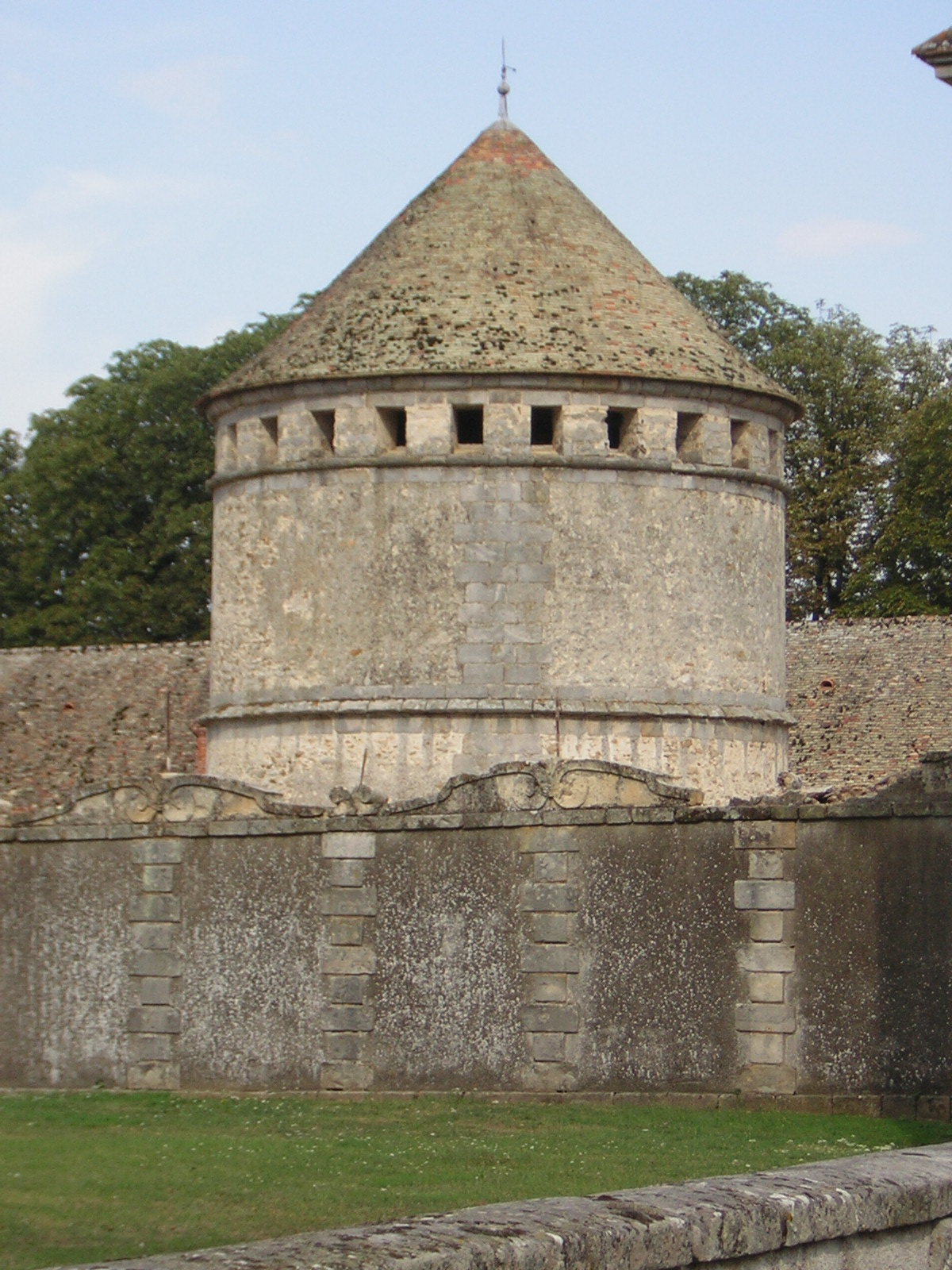
The dovecote

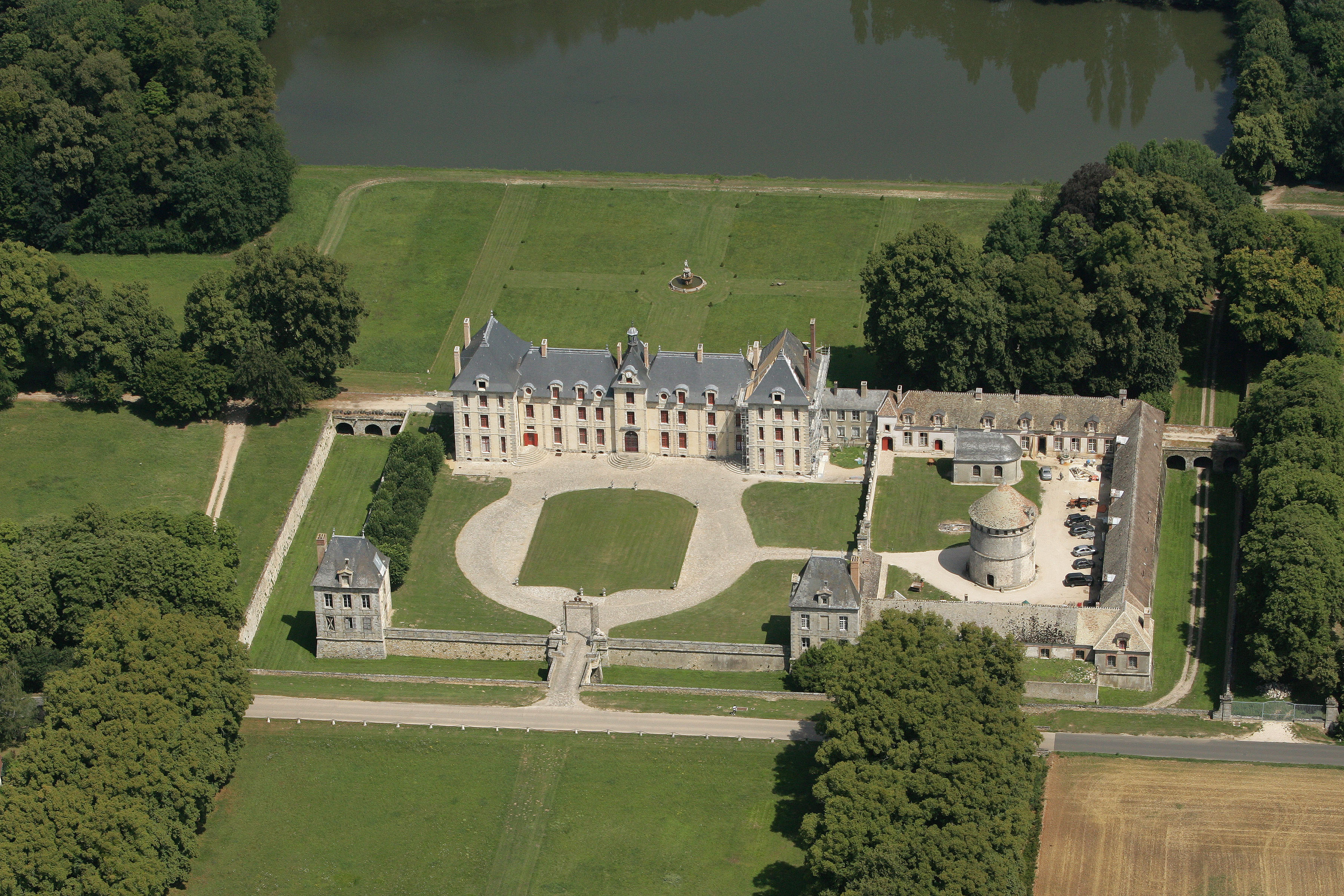
Aerial view of the château and its outbuildings
