= Lardy, Essonne =

Commune in Île-de-France, France

Lardy
- Commune
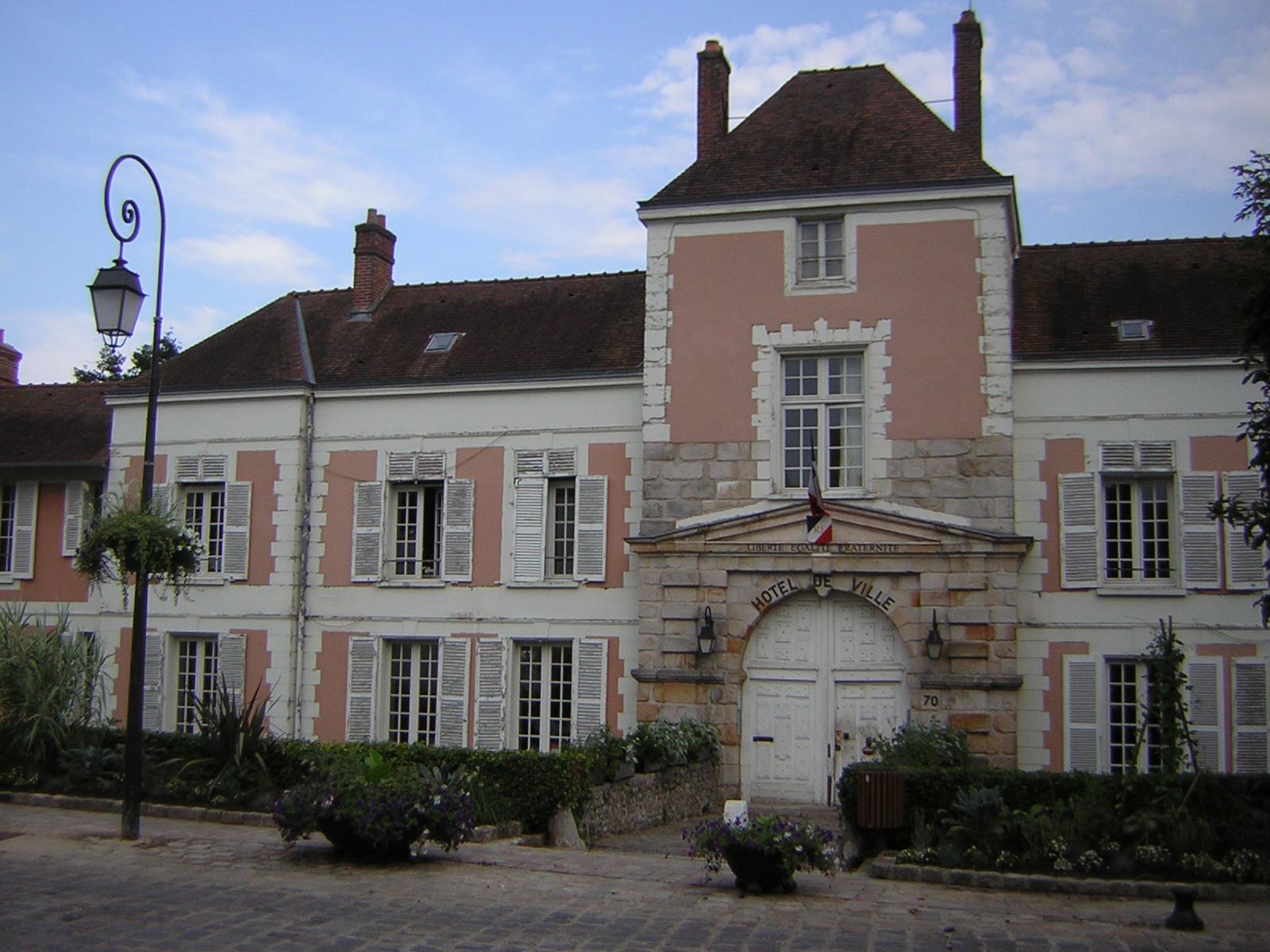
- The town hall in Lardy

- Coat of arms
- Location of Lardy
- Location within France Location within Île-de-France (region)
- Coordinates: 48°31′14″N 2°15′56″E
- Country: France
- Region: Île-de-France
- Department: Essonne
- Arrondissement: Étampes
- Canton: Arpajon
- Intercommunality: CC Entre Juine et Renarde

Government
  - Mayor (2020–2026): Dominique Bougraud
- Area^{1}: 7.63 km^{2} (2.95 sq mi)
- Highest elevation: 154 m (505 ft)
- Lowest elevation: 57 m (187 ft)
- Population (2023): 5,530
  - Density: 725/km^{2} (1,880/sq mi)
- Time zone: UTC+01:00 (CET)
  - Summer (DST): UTC+02:00 (CEST)
- INSEE/Postal code: 91330 /91510
- ^{1} French Land Register data, which excludes lakes, ponds, glaciers > 1 km^{2} (0.386 sq mi or 247 acres) and river estuaries.

Lardy (French pronunciation: [laʁdi]) is a commune in the Essonne department in Île-de-France in northern France.

== Geography ==
The village lies on the left bank of the river Juine, which forms all of the commune's southern border. It is served by two train stations, both on the RER C line from Étampes to Paris: Lardy station and Bouray station.

== Population ==
Inhabitants of Lardy are known as Larziacois in French.

Historical population
Year	Pop.	±% p.a.
1968	2,275	—
1975	2,852	+3.28%
1982	2,922	+0.35%
1990	3,658	+2.85%
1999	4,375	+2.01%
2007	5,754	+3.48%
2012	5,578	−0.62%
2017	5,526	−0.19%
2023	5,530	+0.01%
Source: INSEE

== See also ==
- Communes of the Essonne department
