= Itteville =

Commune in Île-de-France, France

- Commune
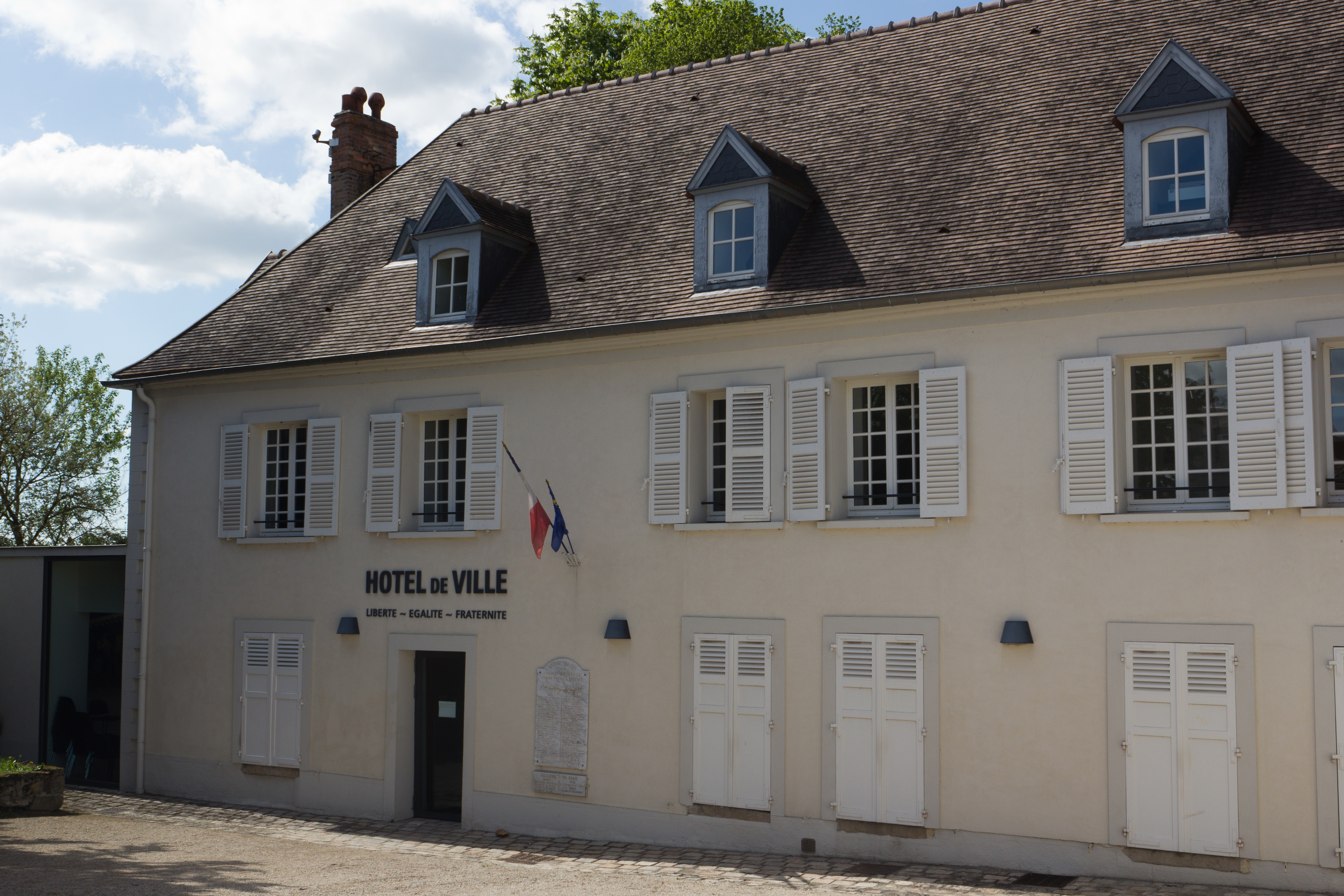
- The town hall of Itteville

- Coat of arms
- Location of Itteville
- Location within France Location within Île-de-France (region)
- Coordinates: 48°30′55″N 2°20′30″E
- Country: France
- Region: Île-de-France
- Department: Essonne
- Arrondissement: Étampes
- Canton: Mennecy
- Intercommunality: Val d'Essonne

Government
  - Mayor (2020–2026): François Parolini
- Area^{1}: 12.20 km^{2} (4.71 sq mi)
- Highest elevation: 141 m (463 ft)
- Lowest elevation: 47 m (154 ft)
- Population (2023): 6,746
  - Density: 553.0/km^{2} (1,432/sq mi)
- Time zone: UTC+01:00 (CET)
  - Summer (DST): UTC+02:00 (CEST)
- INSEE/Postal code: 91315 /91760
- ^{1} French Land Register data, which excludes lakes, ponds, glaciers > 1 km^{2} (0.386 sq mi or 247 acres) and river estuaries.

Itteville (French pronunciation: [itvil]) is a commune in the Essonne department in Île-de-France in northern France.

Itteville's twin town has been Newick in the United Kingdom since 1988. The distance between both towns is 320 kilometres (199 miles).

== Origin of the town name ==
The original name of the commune comes from the Latin Ittae Villa meaning "Itte farm" referring to Itta of Nivelles, spouse of Pépin de Landen who built a farm. The commune was created in 1793 under the name of Itterville. The current orthography was introduced in 1801 in the law bulletin.

== Geographical situation ==
The Juine forms the commune's northwestern and northern borders, then flows into the Essonne, which forms the commune's eastern border. Itteville is 38 kilometres (24 miles) south of Paris Notre Dame, point zero on French roads, 15 kilometres (9 miles) south west of Évry, 16 kilometres (10 miles) north east of Étampes, 3 kilometres (2 miles) north of La Ferté-Alais, 11 kilometres (7 miles) south east of Arpajon, 15 kilometres (9 miles) south east of Montlhéry, 15 kilometres (9 miles) south west of Corbeil-Essonnes, 16 kilometres (10 miles) north west of Milly-la-Forêt, 23 kilometres (14 miles) south east of Palaiseau and 24 kilometres (15 miles) east of Dourdan

== Population ==
Inhabitants of Itteville are known as Ittevillois in French.

Historical population
Year	Pop.	±% p.a.
1968	2,070	—
1975	2,715	+3.95%
1982	3,528	+3.81%
1990	4,685	+3.61%
1999	5,354	+1.49%
2007	6,325	+2.11%
2012	6,613	+0.89%
2017	6,585	−0.08%
2023	6,746	+0.40%
Source: INSEE

== See also ==
- Communes of the Essonne department
