= Janville-sur-Juine =

Commune in Île-de-France, France

- Commune
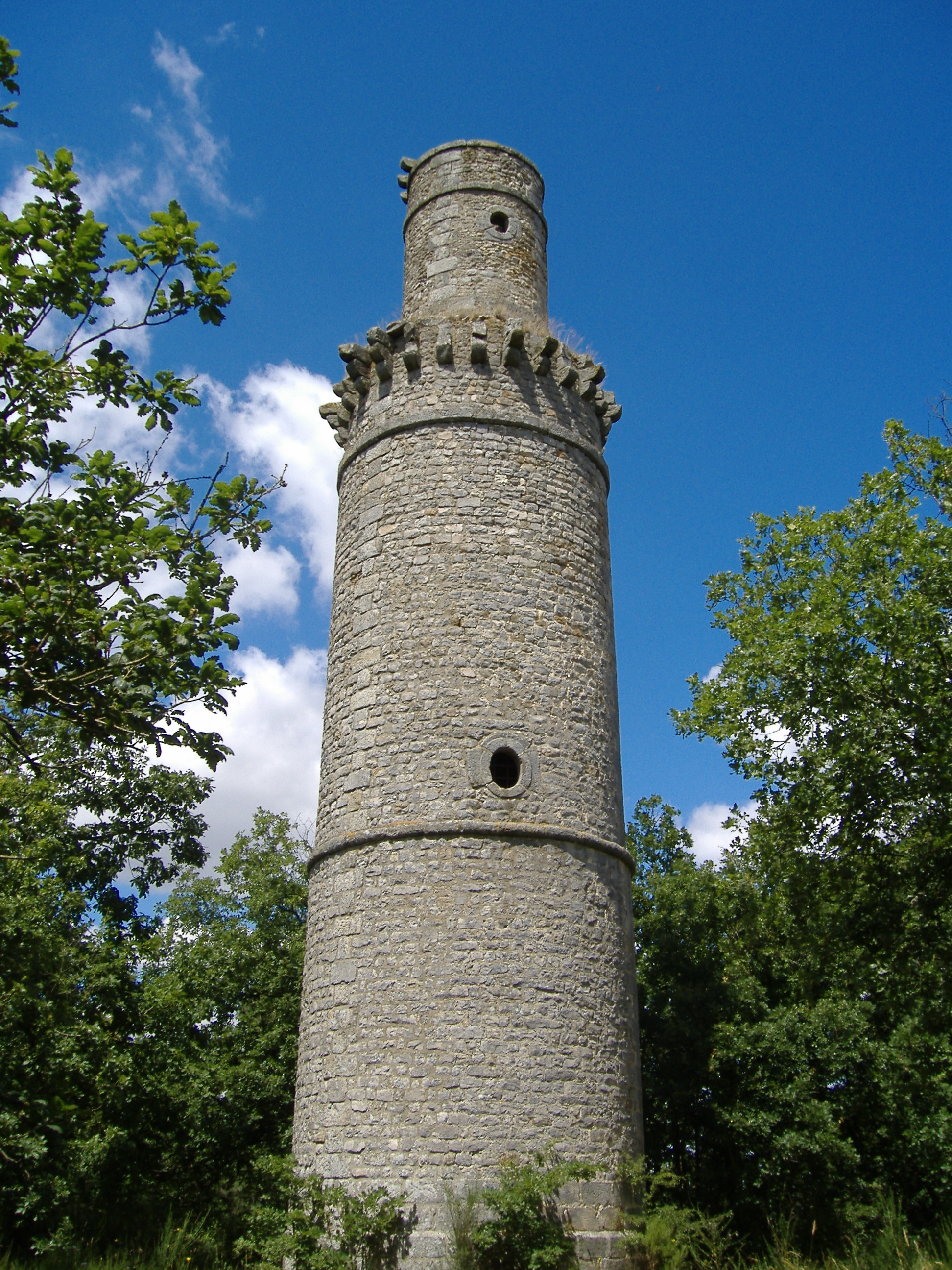
- The Tour de Pocancy, in Janville-sur-Juine
- Location of Janville-sur-Juine
- Location within France Location within Île-de-France (region)
- Coordinates: 48°30′48″N 2°15′38″E
- Country: France
- Region: Île-de-France
- Department: Essonne
- Arrondissement: Étampes
- Canton: Arpajon
- Intercommunality: Entre Juine et Renarde

Government
  - Mayor (2023–2026): Séverine Galibert
- Area^{1}: 10.67 km^{2} (4.12 sq mi)
- Highest elevation: 152 m (499 ft)
- Lowest elevation: 59 m (194 ft)
- Population (2023): 2,041
  - Density: 191.3/km^{2} (495.4/sq mi)
- Time zone: UTC+01:00 (CET)
  - Summer (DST): UTC+02:00 (CEST)
- INSEE/Postal code: 91318 /91510
- ^{1} French Land Register data, which excludes lakes, ponds, glaciers > 1 km^{2} (0.386 sq mi or 247 acres) and river estuaries.

Janville-sur-Juine (French pronunciation: [ʒɑ̃vil syʁ ʒɥin], literally Janville on Juine) is a commune in the Essonne department in Île-de-France in northern France.

Inhabitants of Janville-sur-Juine are known as Janvillois.

== Geography ==
The village lies on the right bank of the river Juine, which forms all of the commune's northern border.

== Population ==
Historical population
| Year | Pop. | ±% p.a. |
|---|---|---|
| 1968 | 894 | — |
| 1975 | 1,314 | +5.66% |
| 1982 | 1,527 | +2.17% |
| 1990 | 1,714 | +1.45% |
| 1999 | 1,788 | +0.47% |
| 2007 | 1,855 | +0.46% |
| 2012 | 1,933 | +0.83% |
| 2017 | 1,962 | +0.30% |
| 2023 | 2,041 | +0.66% |
Source: INSEE

== See also ==
- Communes of the Essonne department
