= Blanc-Mesnil =

Coordinates: 49°54′34″N 0°57′52″E

Blanc-Mesnil is a village and former commune in the Seine-Maritime department, northwestern France. Since 1822, it is part of Sainte-Marguerite-sur-Mer.
