= List of châteaux in the Île-de-France =

== Paris ==
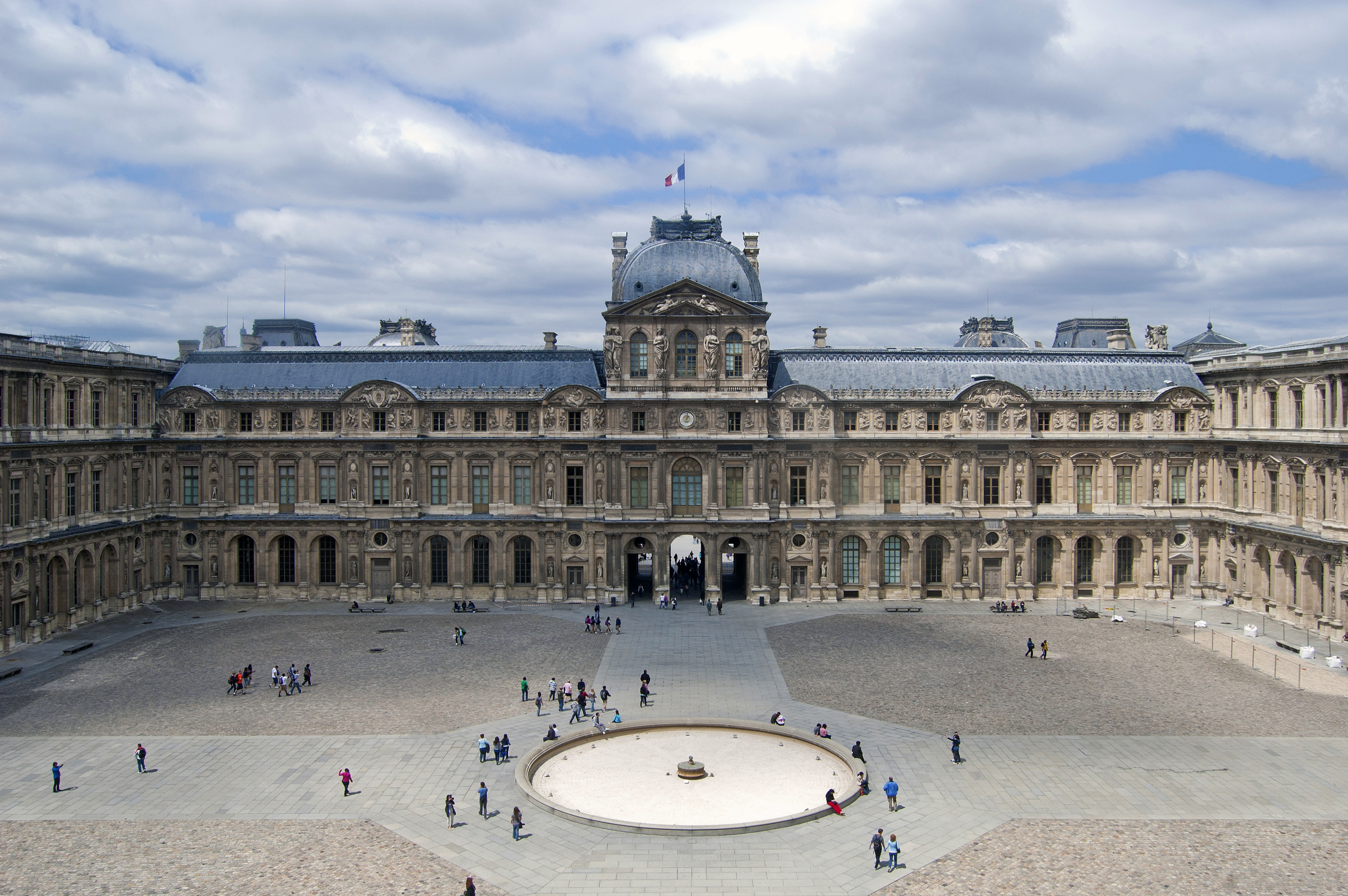
Louvre Palace

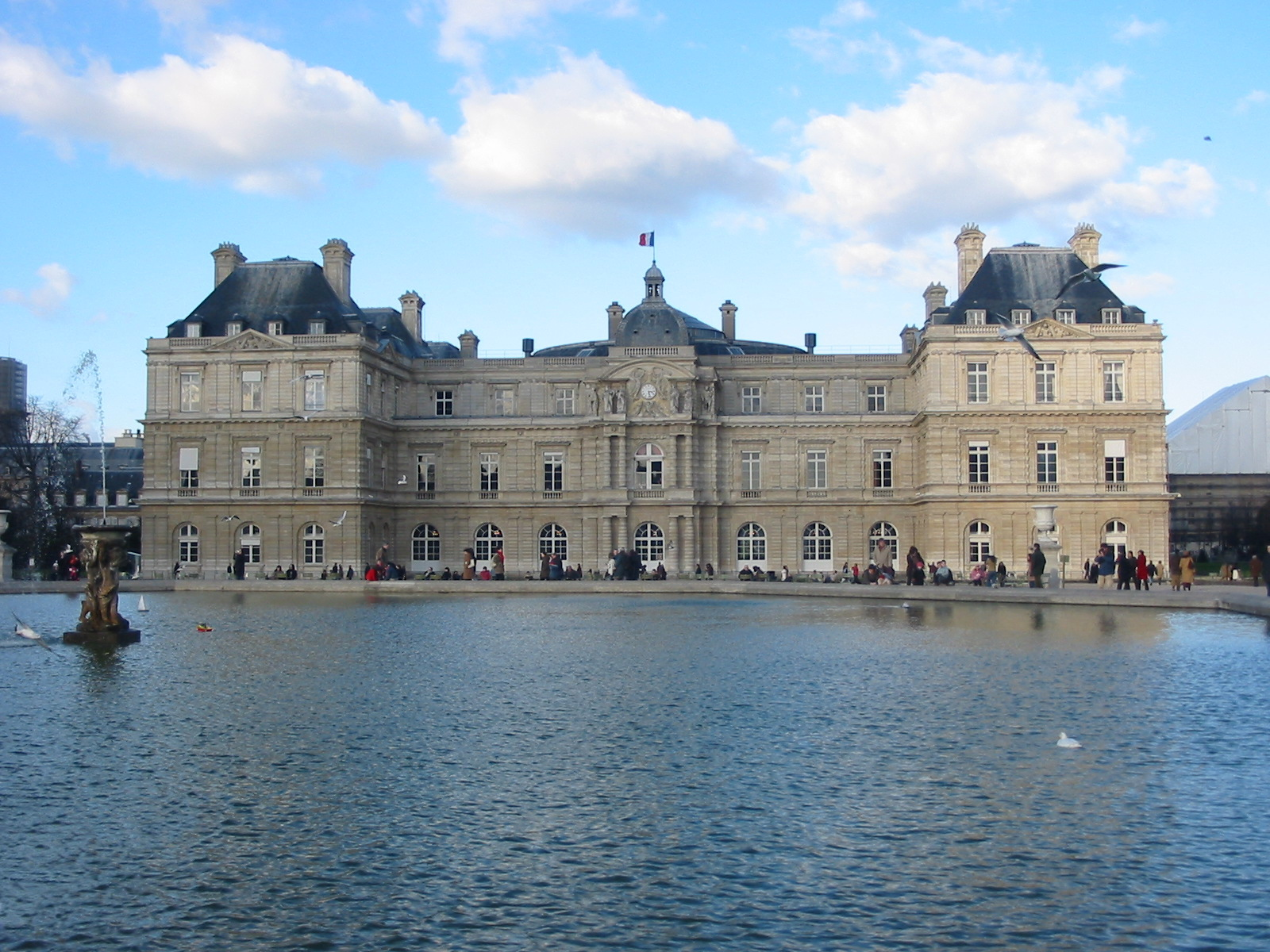
Luxembourg Palace

- Château de Bagatelle
- Château de Bagnolet Ruined
- Bastille Ruined
- Conciergerie Accessible
- Louvre Palace Accessible
- Palais du Luxembourg Accessible
- Château de Madrid Ruined
- Château de la Muette
- Palais-Royal Accessible
- Château de Reuilly Ruined
- Maison du Temple Ruined
- Château de la Tournelle Ruined
- Palais des Tuileries Ruined

== Seine-et-Marne ==
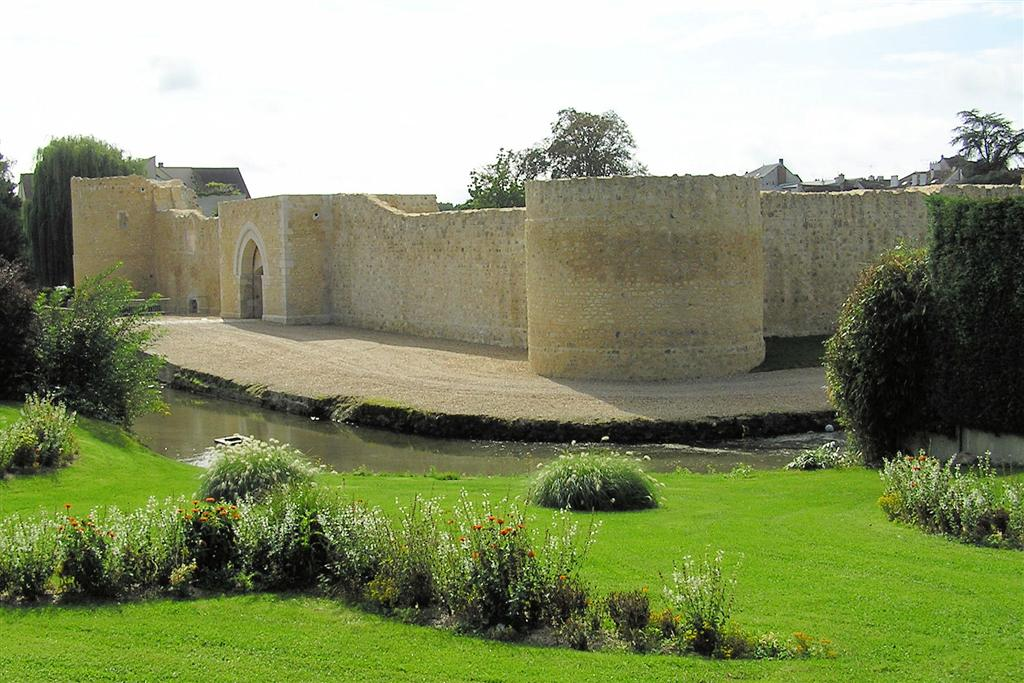
Château de Brie-Comte-Robert

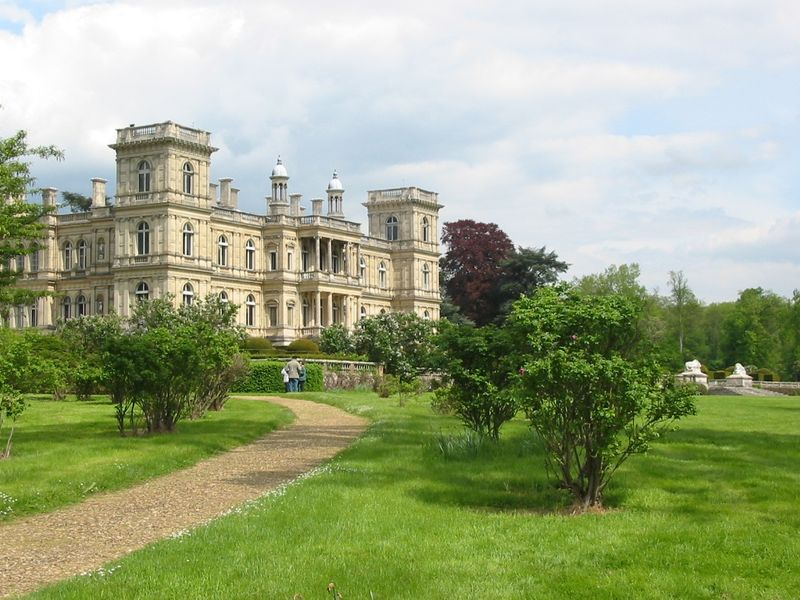
Château de Ferrières

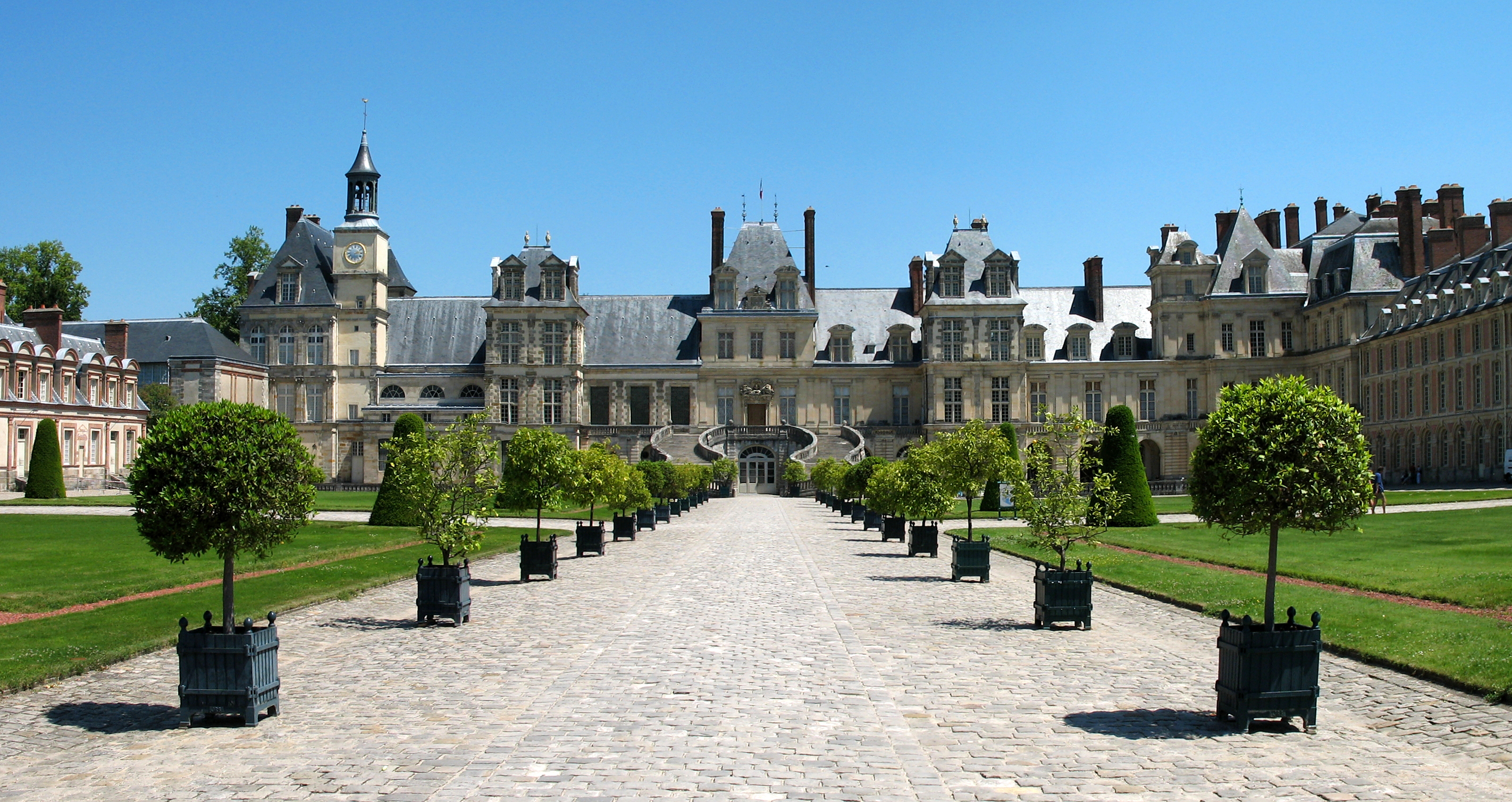
Château de Fontainebleau

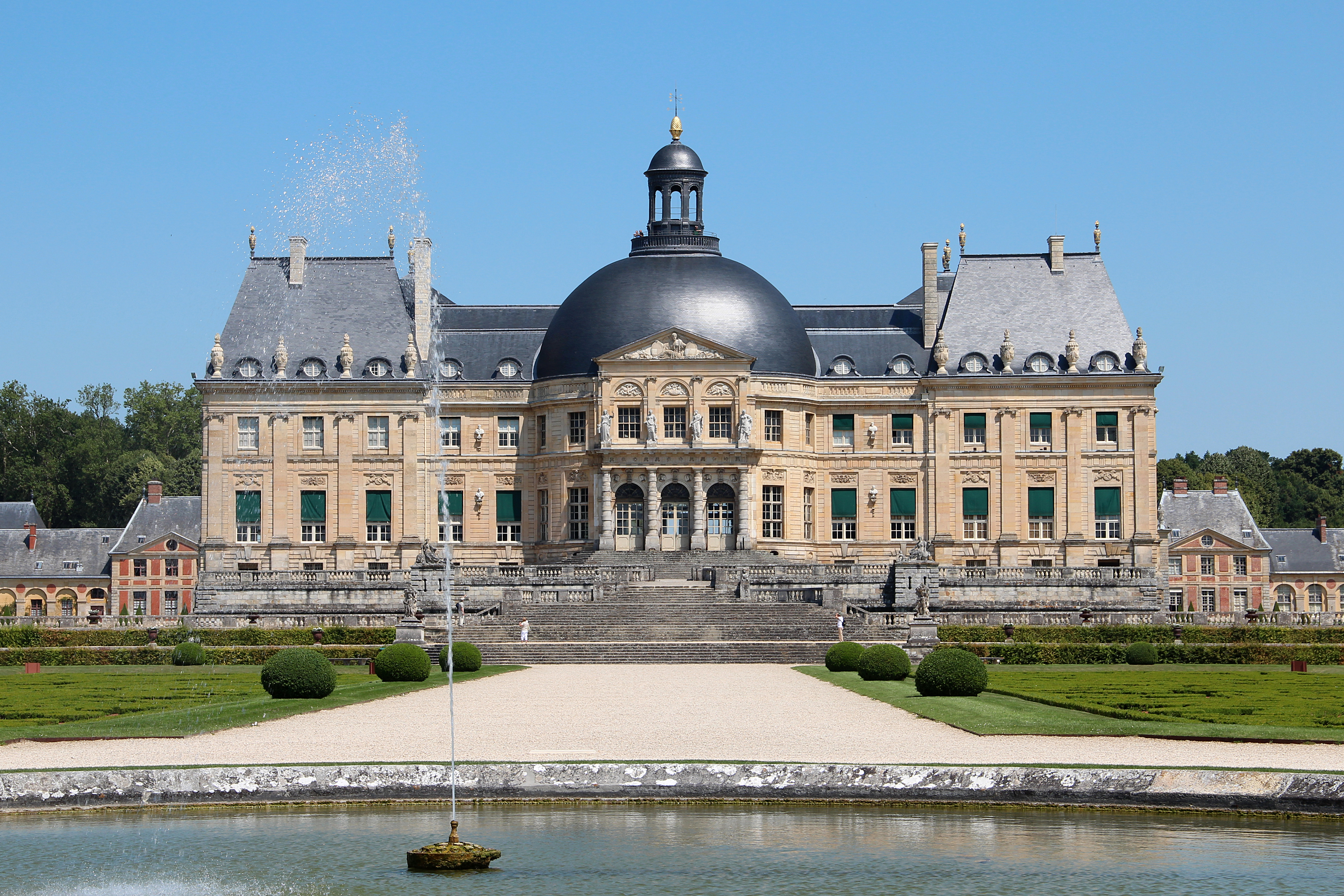
Château de Vaux-le-Vicomte

- Château d'Aunoy, Champeaux
- Château de Blandy-les-Tours, Blandy Accessible
- Château des Boulayes, Châtres
- Château de Bourron, Bourron-Marlotte. Accessible
- Château de Brie-Comte-Robert, Brie-Comte-Robert Accessible
- Château de Brou, Brou-sur-Chantereine Accessible
- Château de By, Thomery, place of death of Rosa Bonheur, French painter
- Château de Champgueffier, La Chapelle-Iger Accessible
- Château de Champs-sur-Marne, Champs-sur-Marne Accessible
- Château de La Chapelle, La Chapelle-Gauthier
- Château de Diant, Diant
- Château d'Égreville, Égreville
- Château de Ferrières, Ferrières-en-Brie Accessible
- Château de Fleury-en-Bière, Fleury-en-Bière
- Palace of Fontainebleau, Fontainebleau Accessible
- Château de Forges, Montereau
- Château de Fortoiseau, Villiers-en-Bière, place of death of Philippe Néricault Destouches, actor and dramatist.
- Château de Grandpuits, Grandpuits-Bailly-Carrois
- Château de la Grange-Bléneau, Courpalay
- Château de la Grange-le-Roy, Grisy-Suisnes
- Château de la Trousse, Cocherel
- Château de Guermantes, Guermantes
- Château du Houssoy, Crouy-sur-Ourcq
- Château du Jard, Voisenon
- Château de Jossigny, Jossigny
- Château de Montaiguillon, Louan-Villegruis-Fontaine
- Château de Montceaux, otherwise known as Château des Reines, Montceaux-lès-Meaux
- Château de Montgermont, Pringy
- Château de Moret, Moret-sur-Loing
- Château de La Motte Nangis, Nangis
- Château de Nandy, Nandy
- Château de Nantouillet, Nantouillet
- Château de Nemours, Nemours Accessible
- Château de Poncher, Lésigny
- Château du Pré, Chartrettes
- Château de la Reine Blanche, Provins Accessible
- Château de Rouillon, Chartrettes
- Château de Saint-Ange de Villecerf, Villecerf
- Château de Sainte-Assise, Seine-Port
- Château de Sigy, Sigy
- Château de Vaux-le-Vicomte, Maincy, former residence of Nicolas Fouquet, Superintendent of Finances to Louis XIV. Accessible
- Château de Villiers-Chapuis, Pamfou
- Château de Villiers-les-Maillets, Saint-Barthélemy
- Château des Vives Eaux, Dammarie-lès-Lys
- Château de Voisenon, Voisenon

== Yvelines ==
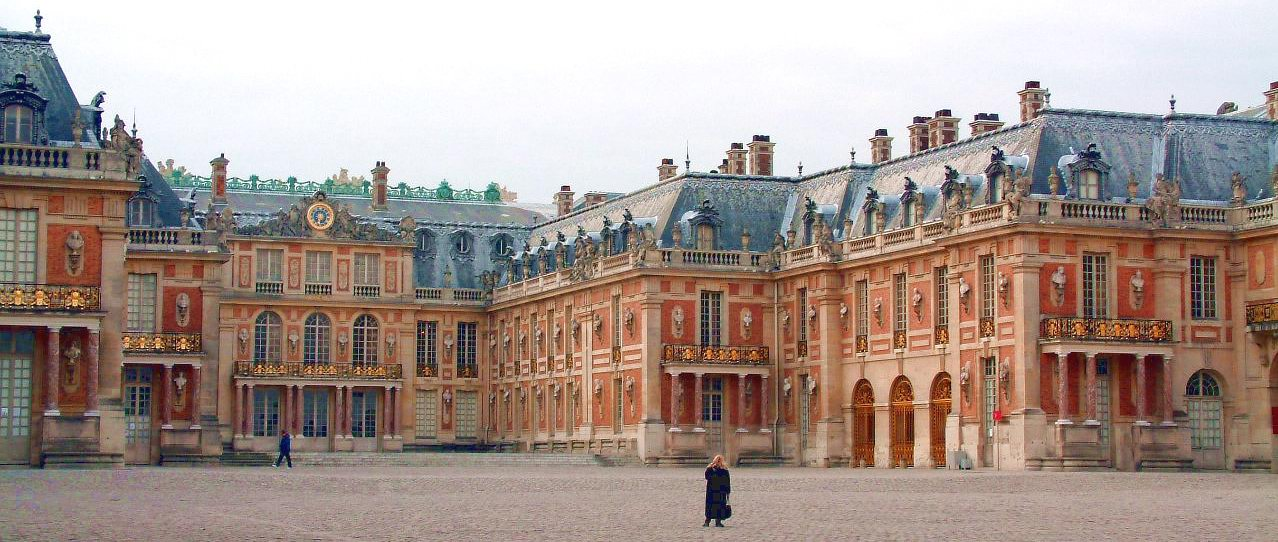
Château de Versailles

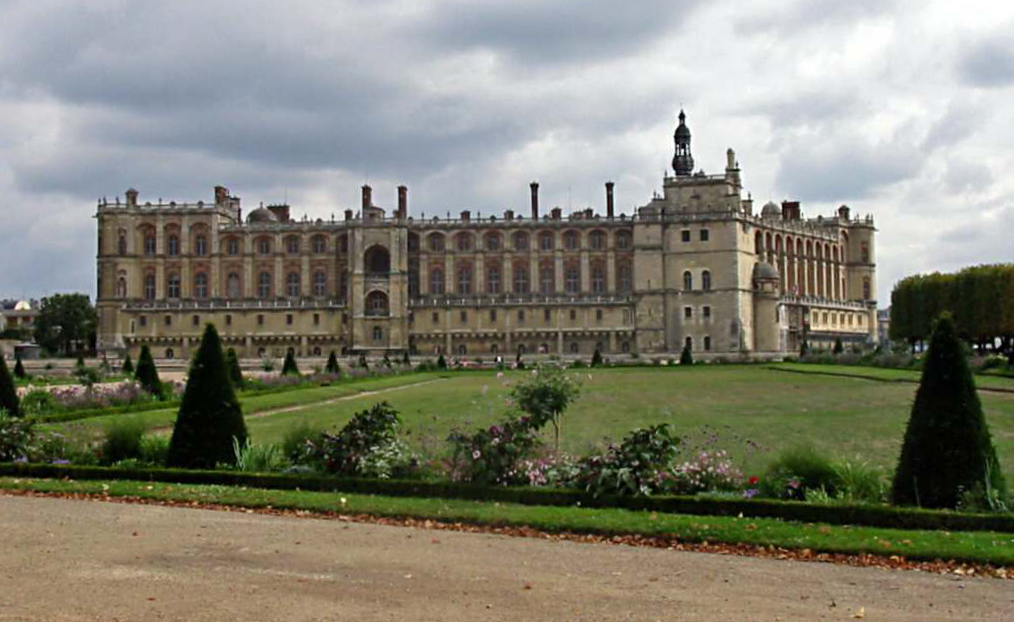
Château de Saint-Germain-en-Laye

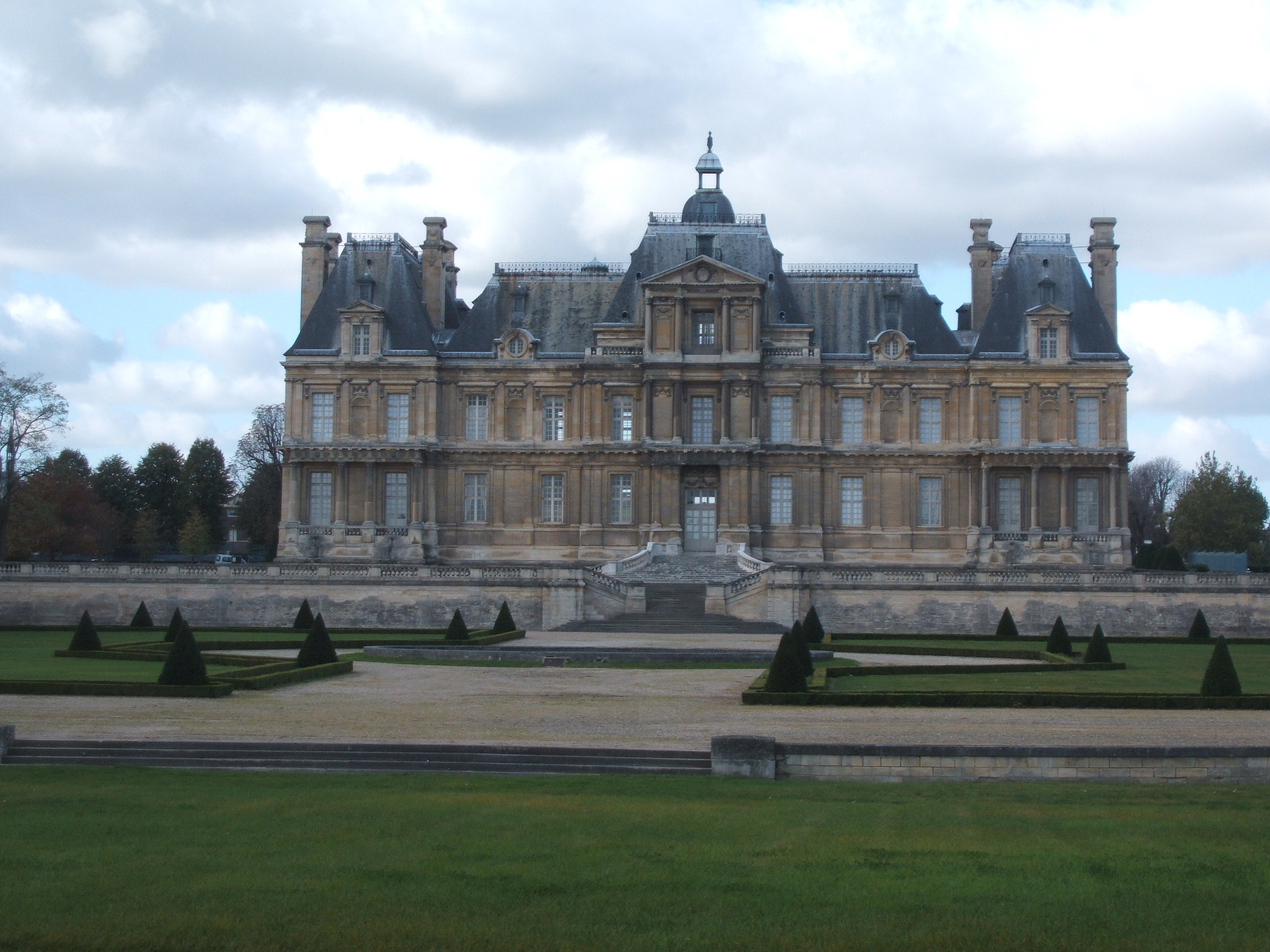
Château de Maisons

Incorporating part of the ancient province of Hurepoix

- Château d'Acosta, Aubergenville, Ruined
- Château d'Agnou, Maule
- Château de Madame du Barry, Louveciennes
- Château de Beynes, Beynes Accessible
- Château de La Boissière, La Boissière-École
- Château de Bonnelles, Bonnelles
- Château de Boulémont, Herbeville Accessible
- Château de Breteuil, Choisel Accessible
- Château du Breuil, Garancières
- Château du Buat, Maule Accessible
- Château de la Celle, La Celle Saint-Cloud
- Château des Clayes-sous-Bois, Clayes-sous-Bois
- Château de Coubertin, Saint-Rémy-lès-Chevreuse Accessible
- Château de Dampierre, Dampierre-en-Yvelines Accessible
- Château d'Épône, Épône
- Château de Grignon, Thiverval-Grignon
- Château de Groussay, Montfort-l'Amaury
- Château du Haut-Buc, Buc Accessible
- Donjon de Houdan, Houdan Accessible
- Château de Launay, Villiers-le-Mahieu Accessible
- Château de la Madeleine, Chevreuse Accessible
- Château de Maisons, Maisons-Laffitte Accessible
- Château de Marly, Marly-le-Roi
- Donjon de Maurepas, Maurepas
- Château de Mauvières, Saint-Forget Accessible
- Château de Médan, Médan
- Château de Méridon, Chevreuse
- Château du Mesnil-Saint-Denis, Mesnil-Saint-Denis Accessible
- Château des Mesnuls, Mesnuls
- Château de Monte-Cristo, Port-Marly Accessible
- Château de Montfort, also Tour Anne-de-Bretagne, Montfort-l'Amaury
- Pavillon de la Muette, Saint-Germain-en-Laye
- Château de Neuville, Gambais
- Château de Plaisir, Plaisir
- Château de Pontchartrain, Jouars-Pontchartrain
- Château de Rambouillet, Rambouillet
- Château de La Rolanderie, Maule
- Château de Rosny-sur-Seine, Rosny-sur-Seine
- Château de Saint-Germain-en-Laye, Saint-Germain-en-Laye Accessible
- Chateau-Neuf de Saint-Germain-en-Laye, Saint-Germain-en-Laye
- Château de Sauvage, Émancé Accessible
- Château de Théméricourt, Conflans-Sainte-Honorine Accessible
- Château de Thoiry, Thoiry Accessible
- Grand Trianon, Versailles
- Petit Trianon, Versailles
- Château du Val, Saint-Germain-en-Laye
- Château de Triel, Triel-sur-Seine
- Palace of Versailles, Versailles Accessible
- Château de Villennes, Villennes-sur-Seine
- Château de Villiers, Poissy
- Château de Villiers-le-Mahieu, Villiers-le-Mahieu
- Château de Voisins, Saint-Hilarion Accessible
- Château de Wideville, Crespières

== Essonne ==
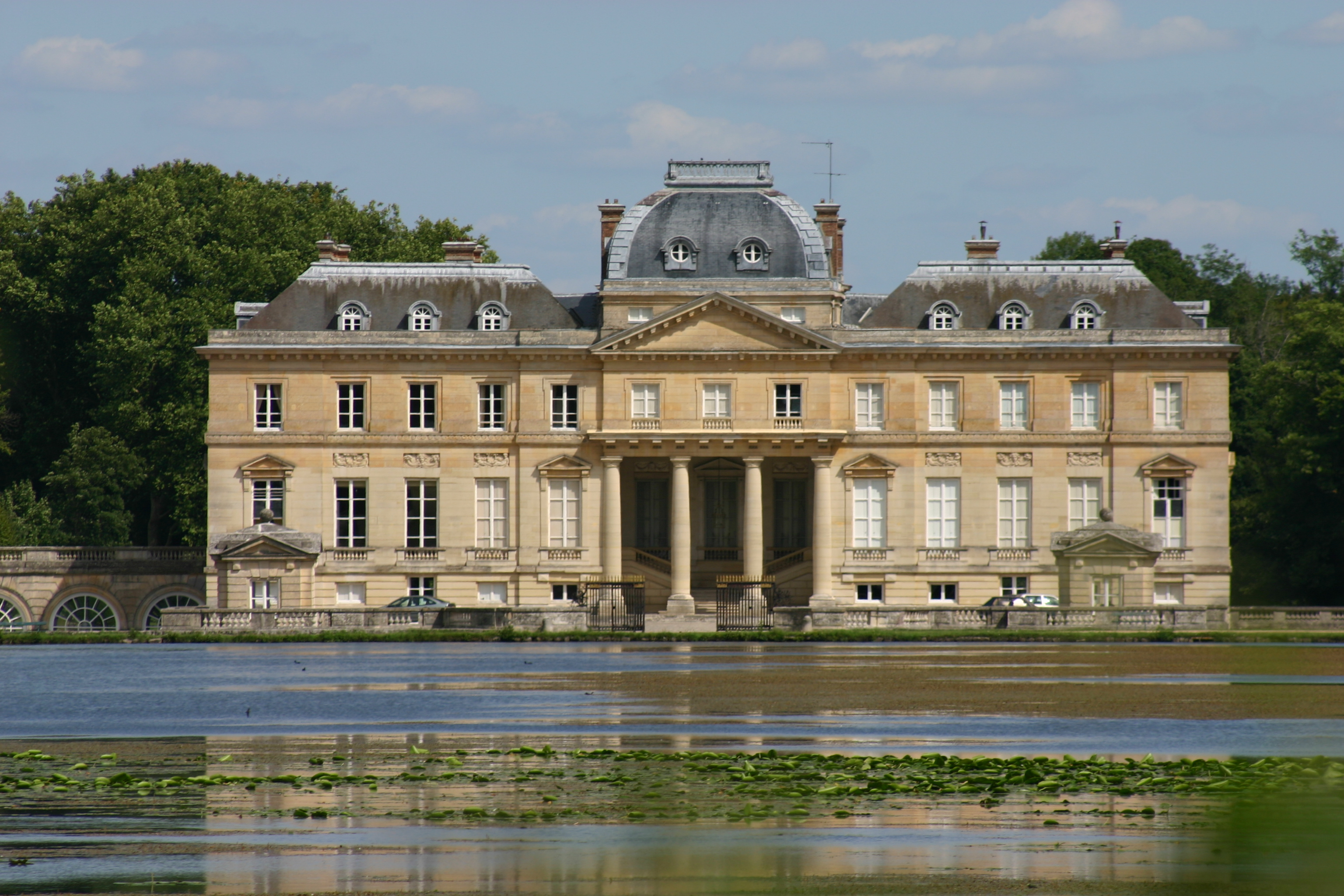
Château du Marais

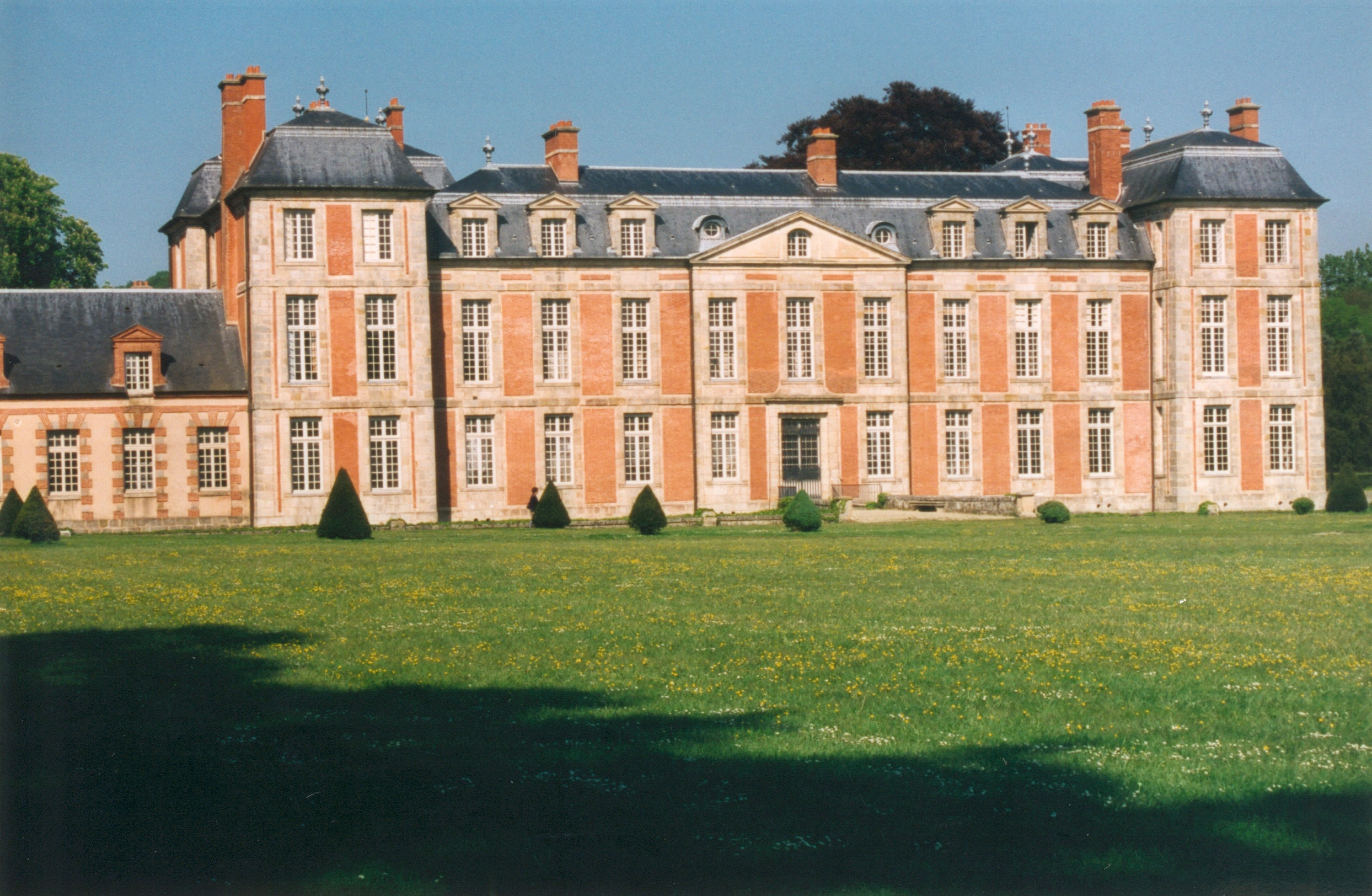
Château de Chamarande

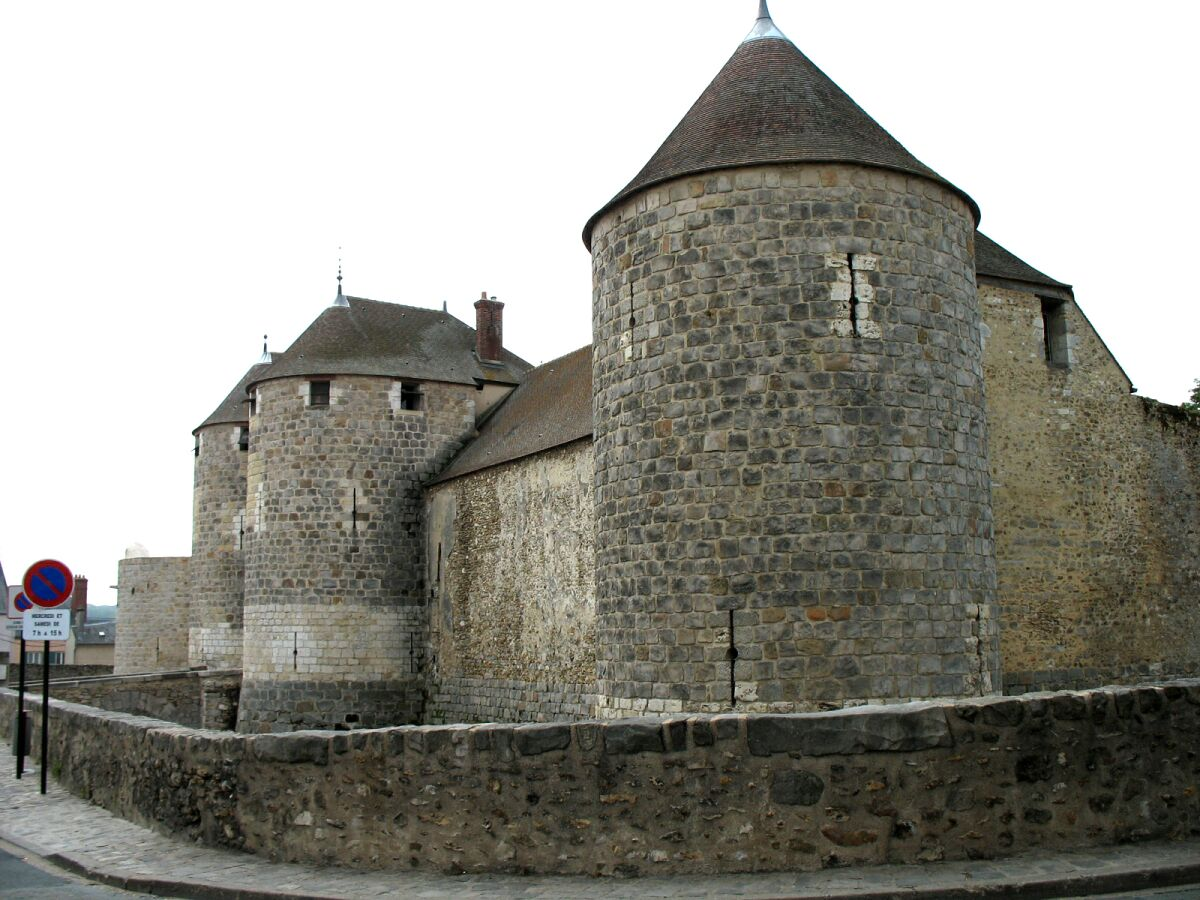
Château de Dourdan

Ancient province of Hurepoix

- Château d'Amblainvilliers, Verrières-le-Buisson
- Château d'Angervilliers, Angervilliers. French Historic Monument.
- Château d'Ardenay, Palaiseau. Private residence
- Manoir des Ardenelles, Villeconin. French Historic Monument.
- Château d'Arny, Bruyères-le-Châtel.
- Manoir des Arpentis, Vauhallan
- Château d'Athis, Athis-Mons. French Historic Monument.
- Château d’Avaucourt, Athis-Mons Accessible
- Château d'Avrainville, Avrainville .
- Château de Bandeville, Saint-Cyr-sous-Dourdan. French Historic Monument.
- Château de Baville, Saint-Chéron. French Historic Monument.
- Château de Beauregard, Saint-Jean-de-Beauregard. French Historic Monument. Accessible
- Château de Beauvoir, Évry
- Château de Bel-Ébat, Marcoussis. Private residence.
- Château de Bellejame, Marcoussis.
- Château de Bièvres, Bièvres.
- Château du Bois-Courtin, Villejust. Private residence.
- Château du Bois Loriot, Verrières-le-Buisson.
- Château de Boutervilliers, Boutervilliers.
- Château de Brunehaut, Morigny-Champigny.
- Château de Bruyères-le-Châtel, Bruyères-le-Châtel.
- Château des Célestins, Marcoussis. Ruined
- Château de Cerny, Cerny
- Château de Chaiges, Athis-Mons.
- Château de Chamarande, Chamarande. French Historic Monument. Accessible
- Château de Chanteloup, Saint-Germain-lès-Arpajon .
- Château de Cheptainville, Cheptainville.
- Château de Chilly-Mazarin, Chilly-Mazarin. French Historic Monument.
- Château de Corbeville, Orsay. Thales research centre.
- Château de Courances, Courances . French Historic Monument. Accessible
- Château de Courdimanche, Courdimanche-sur-Essonne. French Historic Monument.
- Château de Courson, Courson-Monteloup. French Historic Monument. Accessible
- Château de Dommerville, Dommerville. French Historic Monument. Accessible
- Château de Dourdan, Dourdan. French Historic Monument. Accessible
- Château d'Écharcon, Écharcon. French Historic Monument.
- Château de Farcheville, Bouville. French Historic Monument. Accessible
- Manoir de Favreuse, Bièvres.
- Château de la Fontaine, Brétigny-sur-Orge. School.
- Château de Forges, Forges-les-Bains. French Historic Monument.
- Château de Frémigny, Bouray-sur-Juine
- Château de Gif-sur-Yvette, Gif-sur-Yvette. Town hall.
- Château de Gillevoisin, Janville-sur-Juine. French Historic Monument.
- Château de Gironville, Gironville-sur-Essonne.
- Château du Grand Mesnil, Orsay. Psychiatric hospital.
- Château du Grand-Saint-Mars, Chalo-Saint-Mars. French Historic Monument.
- Château du Grand-Saussay, Ballancourt-sur-Essonne. French Historic Monument. Accessible
- Château de la Grange, Villeconin . French Historic Monument. Accessible
- Château de la Grange, Yerres. French Historic Monument.
- Château de Grillon, Dourdan, birthplace of Jean-François Regnard, author and dramatist.
- Tour de Guinette, Étampes. French Historic Monument.
- Château d'Huison-Longueville, D'Huison-Longueville. French Historic Monument.
- Château de Janvry, Janvry.
- Château de Jeurre, Morigny-Champigny. French Historic Monument.
- Château de Launay, Orsay. Paris XI University seat.
- Château de Leuville, Leuville-sur-Orge.
- Château de Limon, Vauhallan.
- Château de Lormoy, Longpont-sur-Orge. Nursing home.
- Château du Marais, au Val-Saint-Germain. Place of death of Gaston Palewski, French politician. French Historic Monument. Accessible.
- Château de la Martinière, Saclay.
- Château de Méréville, Méréville. French Historic Monument. Accessible
- Château du Mesnil, Longpont-sur-Orge
- Château de Mesnil-Voisin, Bouray-sur-Juine. French Historic Monument.
- Château de Mignaux, Verrières-le-Buisson. Ruined
- Château de Milly-la-Forêt, Milly-la-Forêt. French Historic Monument.
- Château de Montagu, Marcoussis. French Historic Monument.
- Château de Monthuchet, Saulx-les-Chartreux.
- Château de Montlhéry, Montlhéry. French Historic Monument.
- Château de Montmirault, Cerny. Ruined
- Château de Morigny, Morigny-Champigny. French Historic Monument.
- Château de Morsang, Morsang-sur-Orge. French Historic Monument.
- Château de La Norville, La Norville.
- Château d'Ollainville, Ollainville. Ruined
- Château d'Orgemont, Cerny. Private residence.
- Château d'Orgeval, Villemoisson-sur-Orge. French Historic Monument.
- Manoir d'Orsigny, Saclay
- Château d'Ozonville, Athis-Mons. Nursing home.
- Château de Paron, Verrières-le-Buisson.
- Château des Pastoureaux, Lardy
- Château de Petit-Bourg, Évry. Ruined
- Château du Petit-Marais, Puiselet-le-Marais.
- Château du Petit-Saint-Mars, Étampes. Nursing home.
- Château du Plessis-Saint-Père, La Ville-du-Bois
- Château de Presles, Cerny. Property of the Carnot family since 1838.
- Manoir de Richeville, Vauhallan
- Château de la Roche, Ollainville.
- Château des Roches, Bièvres. Property of the Soka Gakkai sect. French Historic Monument.
- Château de Roinville, Roinville-sous-Dourdan. French Historic Monument.
- Château de la Roue, Linas. Ruined
- Château du Rué, Ollainville.
- Château de Sainte-Geneviève-des-Bois, Sainte-Geneviève-des-Bois. French Historic Monument.
- Château de Saudreville, Villeconin. French Historic Monument.
- Château du Saussay, Ballancourt-sur-Essonne
- Château de la Saussaye, Palaiseau. Private residence.
- Château Silvy, Bièvres. Town Hall
- Château de la Souche, Montlhéry.
- Domaine de Souzy-la-Briche, Souzy-la-Briche
- Temple de la Gloire, Orsay. French Historic Monument.
- Château de Trousseau, Ris-Orangis. French Historic Monument.
- Château de Valnay, Étampes
- Château de Vauboyen, Bièvres. French Historic Monument.
- Château de Vaudouleurs, Morigny-Champigny.
- Château de Verrières, Verrières-le-Buisson. Town Hall.
- Château de Vilgénis, Massy. Air France training centre. French Historic Monument.
- Château de Villebon-sur-Yvette, Villebon-sur-Yvette. Private school.
- Château de Villebouzin, Longpont-sur-Orge. Nursing home.
- Château de la Ville-du-Bois, La Ville-du-Bois. Private school.
- Château de Villeconin, Villeconin Accessible
- Château de Villelouvette, Égly
- Château de Villemartin, Morigny-Champigny.
- Château de Villiers, Cerny. Property of the De Selve family from 6 December 1528 until 11 April 1935. From 3 July 1959 until 2001, the property was in the ownership of Philippe Clay.
- Château de Villiers, Draveil. French Historic Monument.
- Château de Villiers, Villiers-le-Bâcle. French Historic Monument.
- Château de Villiers-le-Bâcle, Villiers-le-Bâcle. Property of Yves Lecoq. French Historic Monument.
- Château de Vilmorin, Verrières-le-Buisson. French Historic Monument.
- Château de Voisins-le-Tuit, Villiers-le-Bâcle.
- Château d'Yerres, Yerres. French Historic Monument.

== Hauts-de-Seine ==
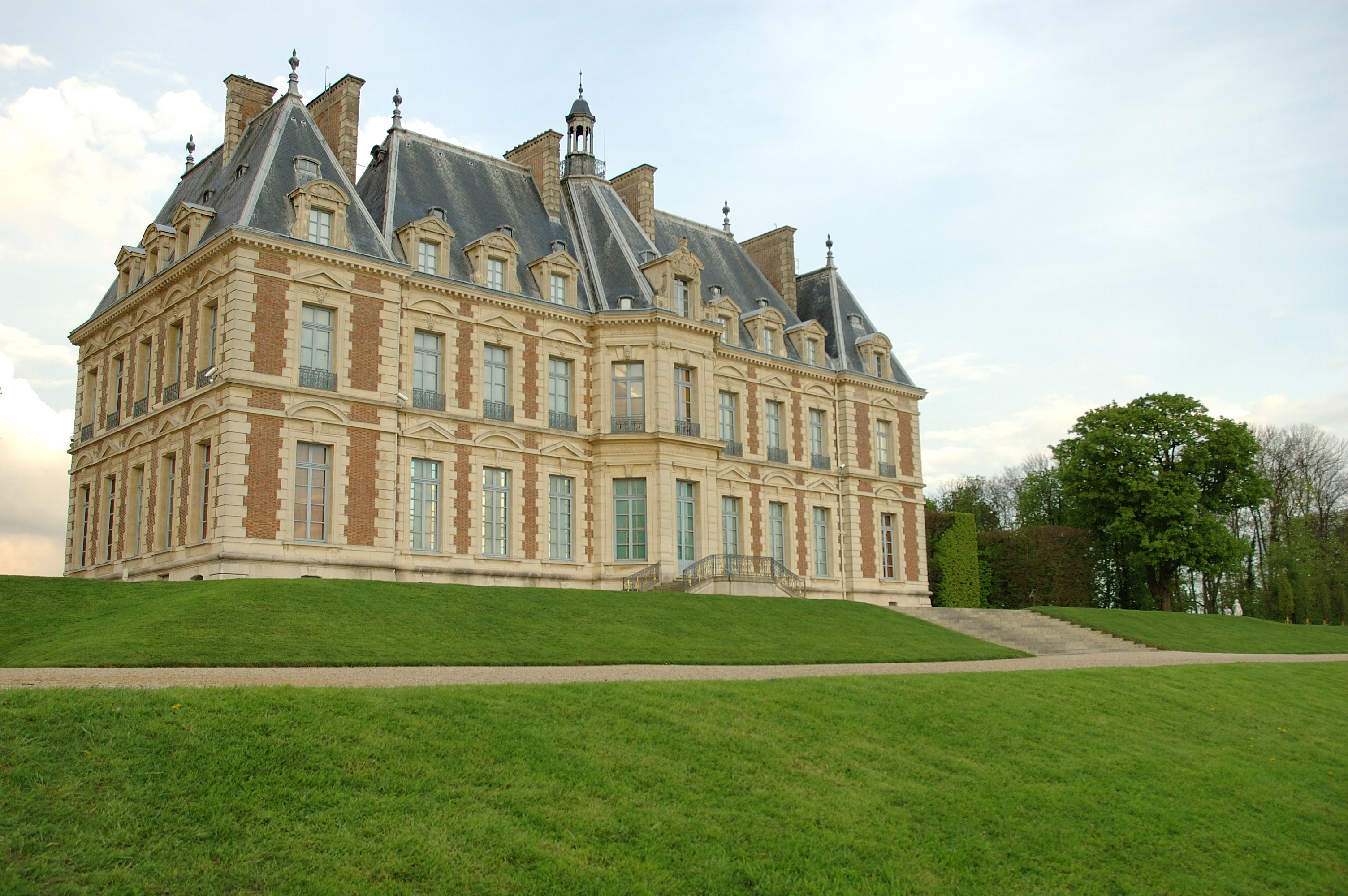
Château de Sceaux

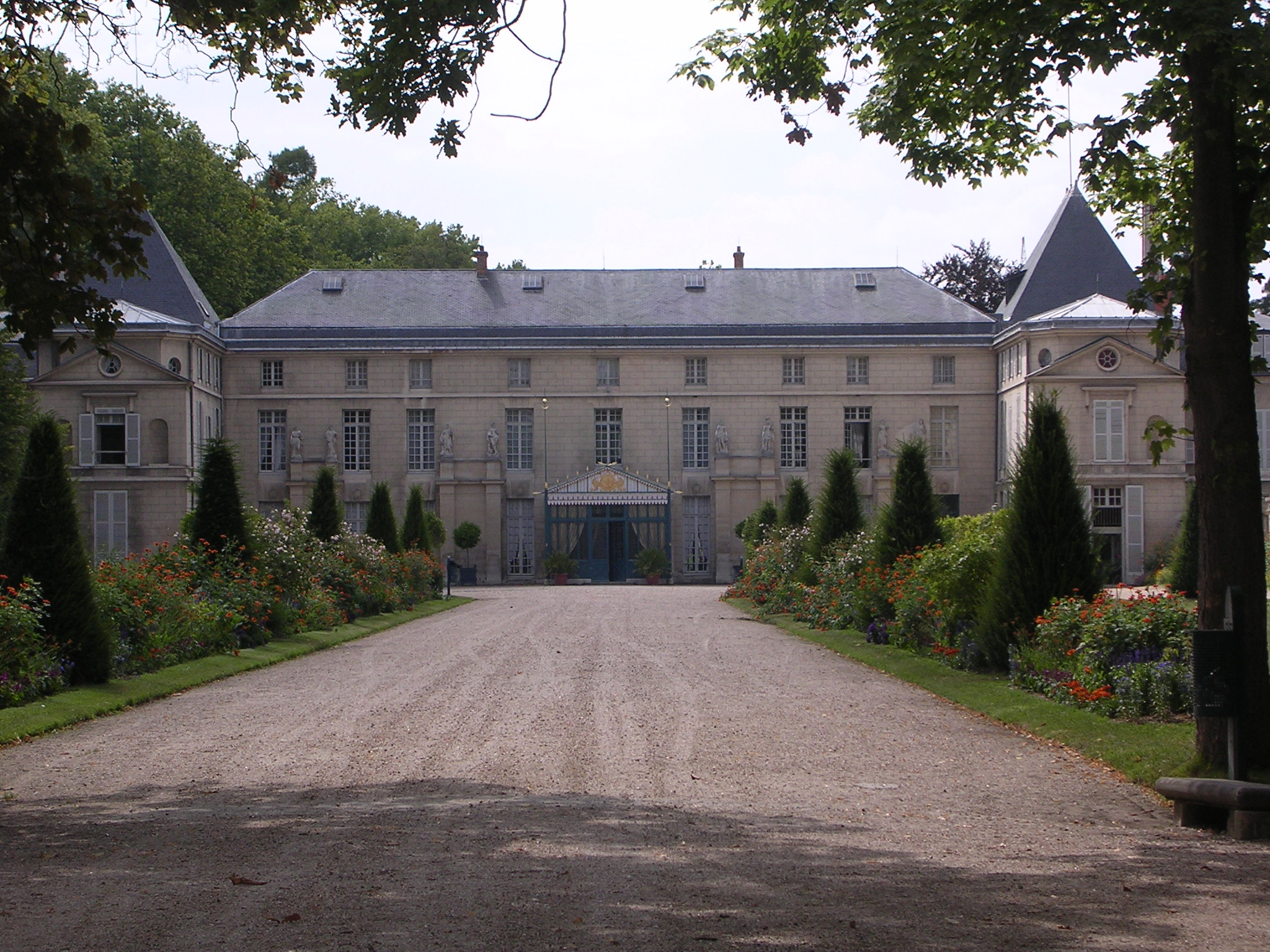
Château de Malmaison

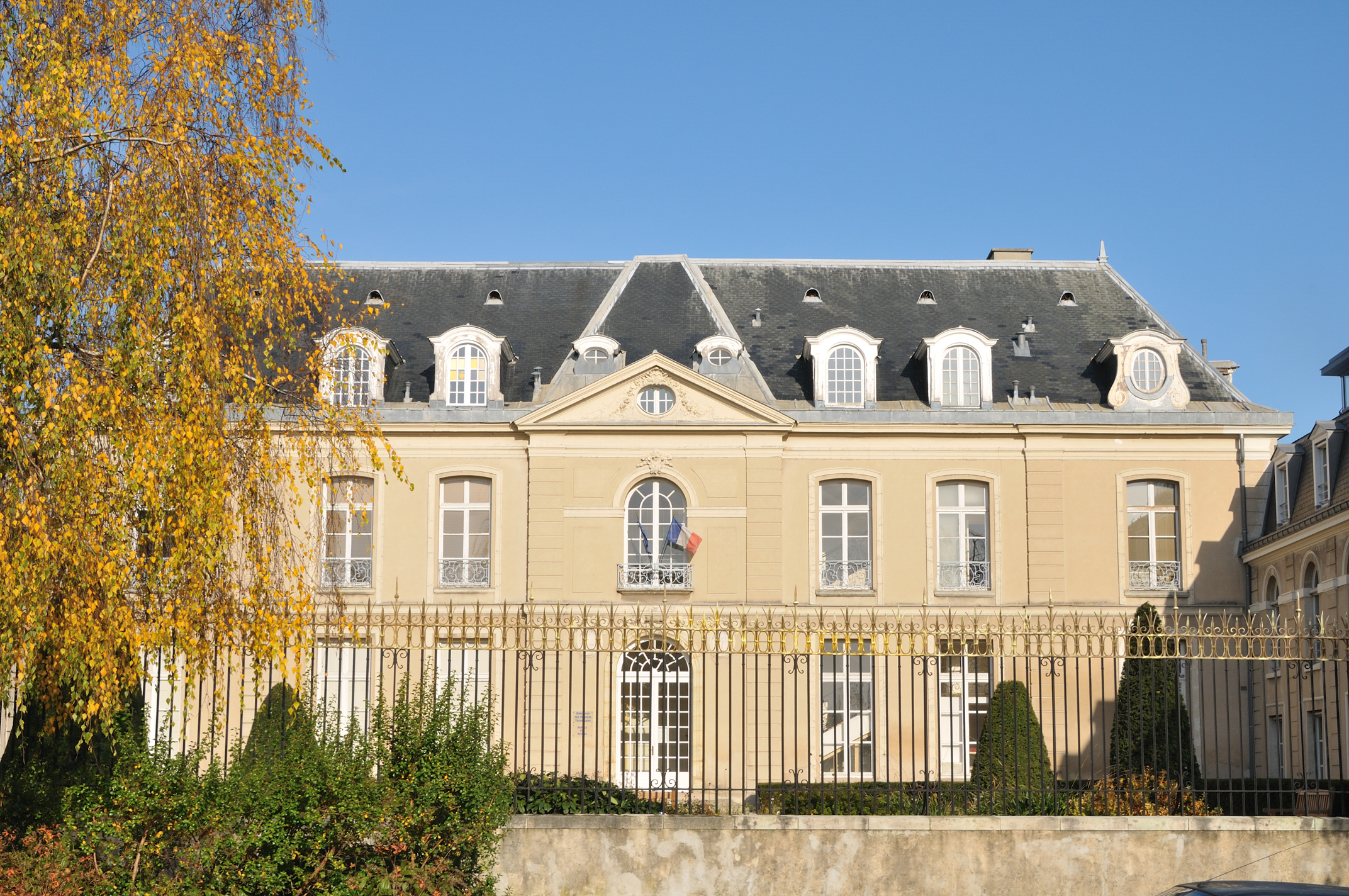
Château Sainte-Barbe-des-Champs

Incorporating part of the ancient province of Hurepoix

- Château d'Antony, Antony.
- Château d'Asnières, Asnières-sur-Seine. French Historic Monument.
- Château Barral, Clamart. Town hall. French Historic Monument.
- Château de Bellevue, Meudon. Ruined
- Château de Bois-Préau, Rueil-Malmaison. Museum. Accessible
- Château La Boissière, Fontenay-aux-Roses. French Historic Monument.
- Château de Bourg-la-Reine, Bourg-la-Reine.
- Château La Boursidière, Châtenay-Malabry.
- Château de Brimborion, Sèvres. Ruined
- Château de Buschillot, Boulogne-Billancourt. French Historic Monument.
- Château de Buzenval, Rueil-Malmaison. Secondary school.
- Château de Chaville, Chaville .
- Château Colbert, Plessis-Robinson.
- Château des Colonnes, Courbevoie.
- Château du Duc de Richelieu, Gennevilliers. Ruined
- La Folie-Saint-James, Neuilly-sur-Seine. Sixth-form college.
- Château de Fontenay, Fontenay-aux-Roses. French Historic Monument.
- Château des Landes, Suresnes. Ruined
- Château de Madrid, Neuilly-sur-Seine. Ruined
- Château de Malmaison, Rueil-Malmaison. Accessible
- Château de la Marche, Marnes-la-Coquette. Ruined
- Château du Marquis de Chamillart, Marnes-la-Coquette. Ruined
- Château du Marquis de Chateauneuf, Montrouge. Ruined
- Château de Meudon, Meudon . Ruined
- Château de Neuilly, Neuilly-sur-Seine. Ruined
- Château d'Ozanam, Asnières-sur-Seine. French Historic Monument.
- Château de la Petite Malmaison, Rueil-Malmaison. French Historic Monument.
- Château de la Petite Roseraie, Châtenay-Malabry. French Historic Monument.
- Château du Plessis-Piquet, Plessis-Robinson. Town hall.
- Château des Princes de Conti, Issy-les-Moulineaux Accessible
- Château de la Ronce, Ville-d'Avray Ruined
- Château Rothschild, Boulogne-Billancourt. French Historic Monument.
- Château de Saint-Cloud, Saint-Cloud. French Historic Monument.
- Château Sainte-Barbe-des-Champs, Fontenay-aux-Roses.
- Château de Sceaux, Sceaux. French Historic Monument. Accessible
- Château de Sèvres, Sèvres. Ruined
- Château de Suresnes, Suresnes. Ruined
- Château de Thierry, Ville-d'Avray.
- Château du Val, Rueil-Malmaison. Ruined
- La Vallée-aux-Loups, Châtenay-Malabry. Museum. Accessible
- Château La Vallière, Montrouge. Ruined
- Château de Vanves, Vanves. Now a lycée
- Château de Villebon, Meudon. Ruined
- Château de Villeneuve-l'Étang, Marnes-la-Coquette. Private institute.

== Seine-Saint-Denis ==
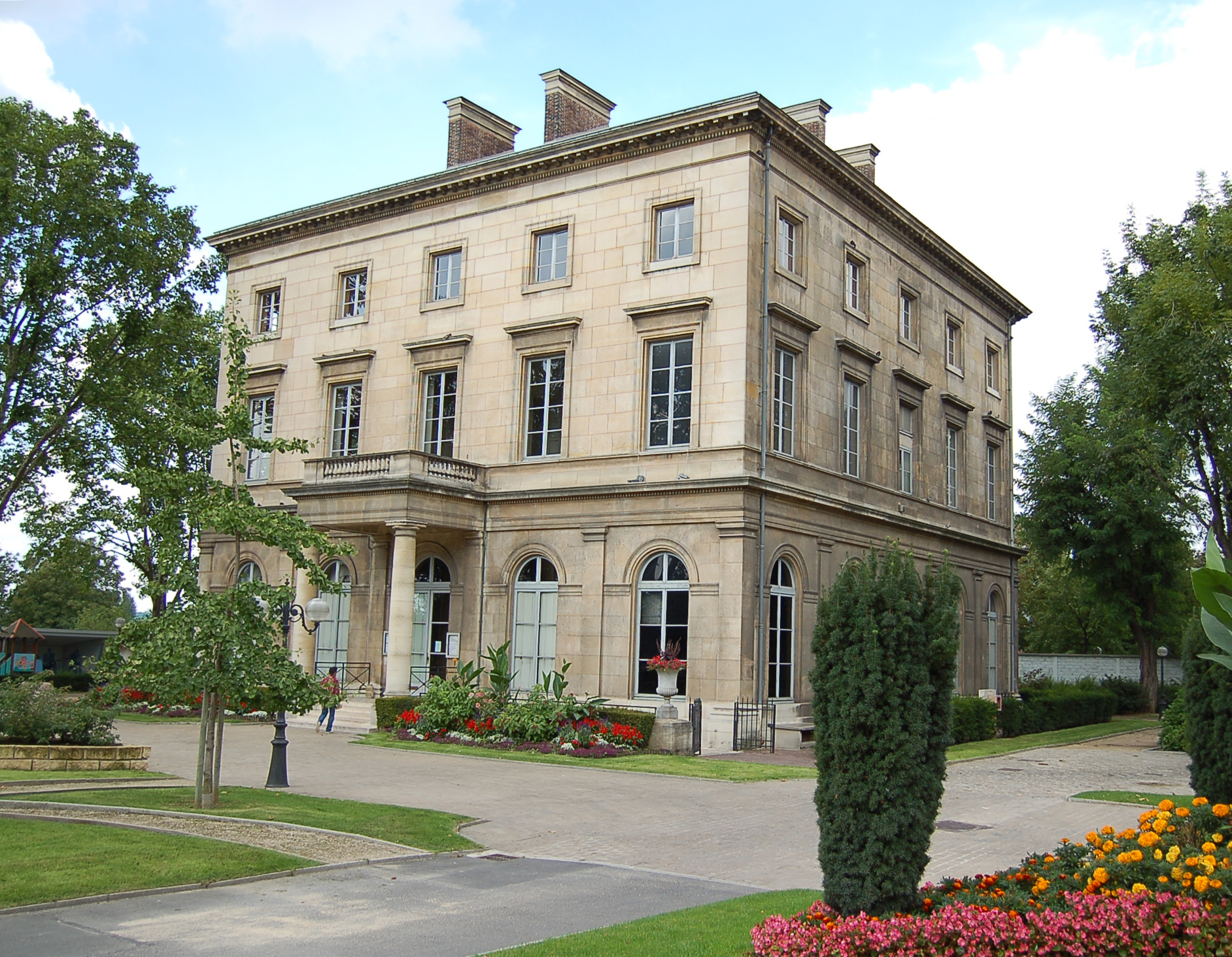
Château de Saint-Ouen

- Château des Cèdres, Montfermeil Accessible
- Château de Gournay, Gournay-sur-Marne
- Petit Château, Montfermeil
- Château de Romainville, Romainville
- Château de Sevran ou Château du Fayet, Sevran
- Château de Saint-Ouen, Saint-Ouen Accessible
- Château de Villemomble, Villemomble

== Val-de-Marne ==
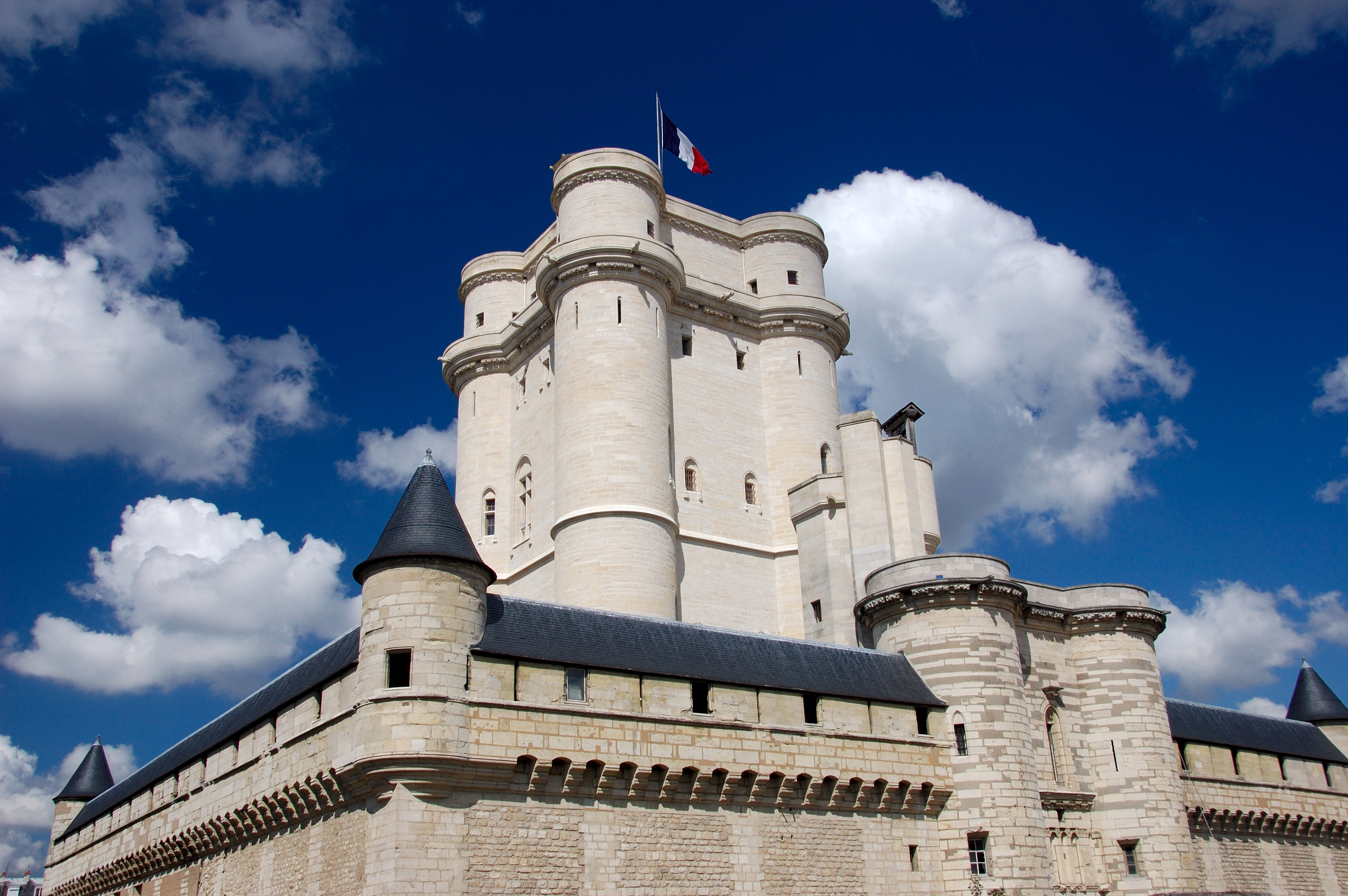
Château de Vincennes

- Beauté-sur-Marne, Nogent-sur-Marne Ruined
- Château de Bercy, Charenton-le-Pont Ruined
- Château de Berny, Fresnes Ruined
- Château de Boissy-Saint-Léger, Boissy-Saint-Léger
- Château de Choisy, Choisy-le-Roi Ruined
- Château de Grosbois, Boissy-Saint-Léger Accessible
- Château d'Ormesson-sur-Marne, Ormesson-sur-Marne Accessible
- Château du Parangon, Joinville-le-Pont
- Pavillon d'Antoine de Navarre, Charenton-le-Pont
- Château de Saint-Maur, Saint-Maur-des-Fossés Ruined
- Château de Vincennes, Vincennes Accessible

== Val-d'Oise ==
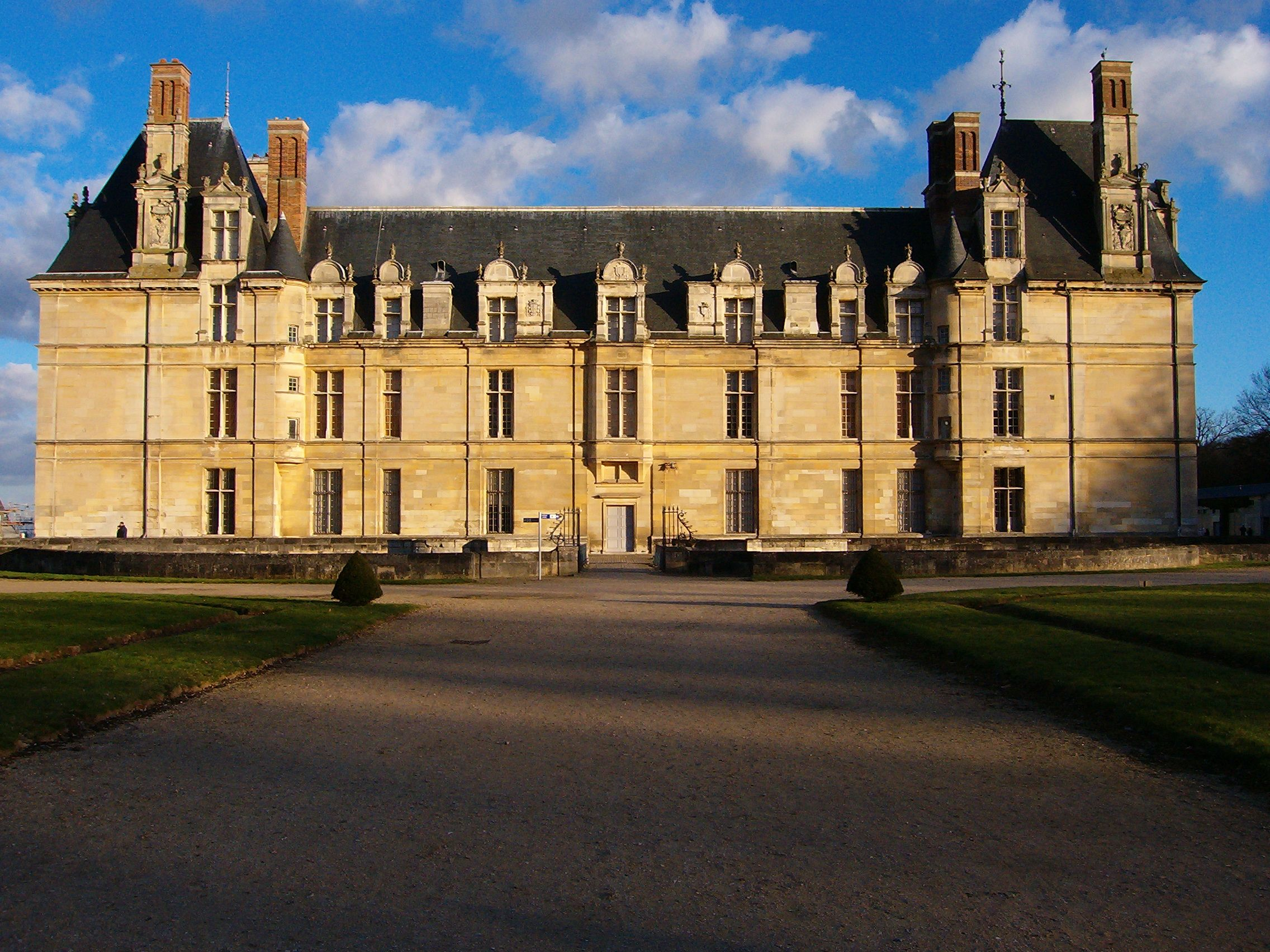
Château d'Écouen

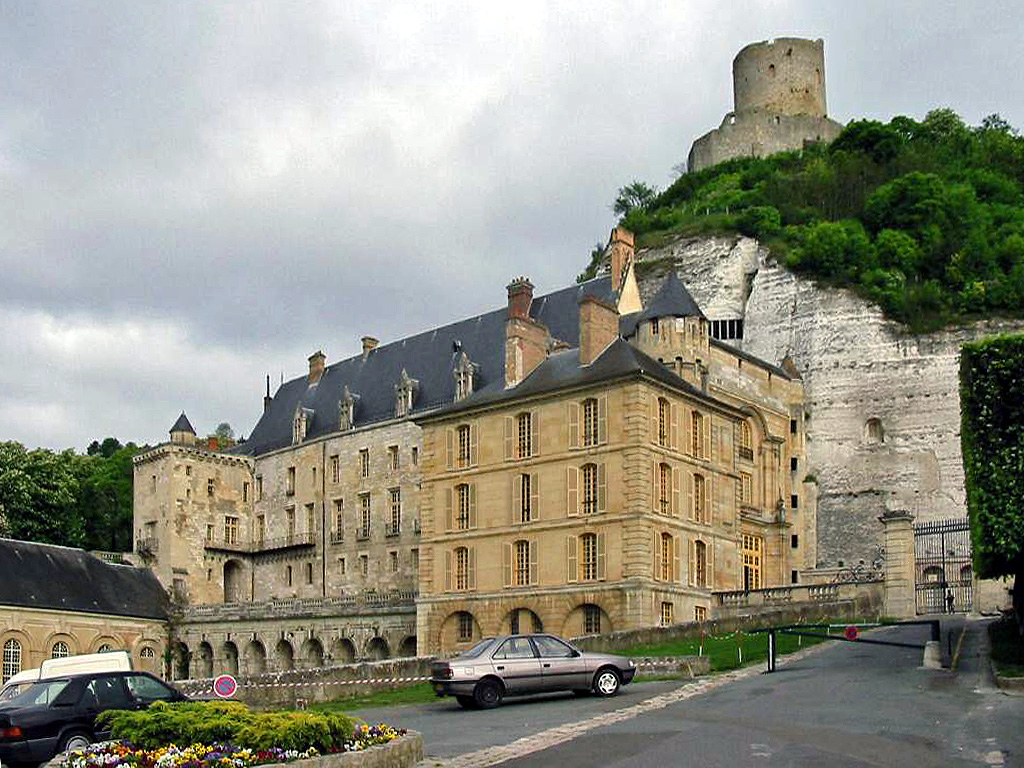
Château de La Roche-Guyon

- Château d'Ambleville, Ambleville Accessible
- Château d'Arnouville, Arnouville
- Château d'Auvers, Auvers-sur-Oise Accessible
- Château de Balincourt, Menouville
- Château de Beaumont-sur-Oise, Beaumont-sur-Oise
- Château de Champlâtreux, Épinay-Champlâtreux Accessible
- Château d'Écouen, Écouen Accessible
- Château de Franconville Saint-Martin-du-Tertre (Val-d'Oise)
- Château du Grand-Bury, Margency
- Château de Grouchy, Osny Accessible
- Château de Hazeville, Wy-dit-Joli-Village
- Château d'Hérouville, Hérouville
- Château de Marines, Marines
- Château de Maudétour, Maudétour-en-Vexin Accessible
- Château de Méry, Méry-sur-Oise Accessible
- Château de Neuville, Neuville-sur-Oise
- Manoir d'Omerville, Omerville
- Château de La Roche-Guyon, La Roche-Guyon Accessible
- Château de Stors, L'Isle-Adam Accessible
- Château de Théméricourt, Théméricourt
- Château de Vigny, Vigny
- Château de Villarceaux, Chaussy Accessible

== See also ==
- List of castles in France
