= Château d'Agnou =

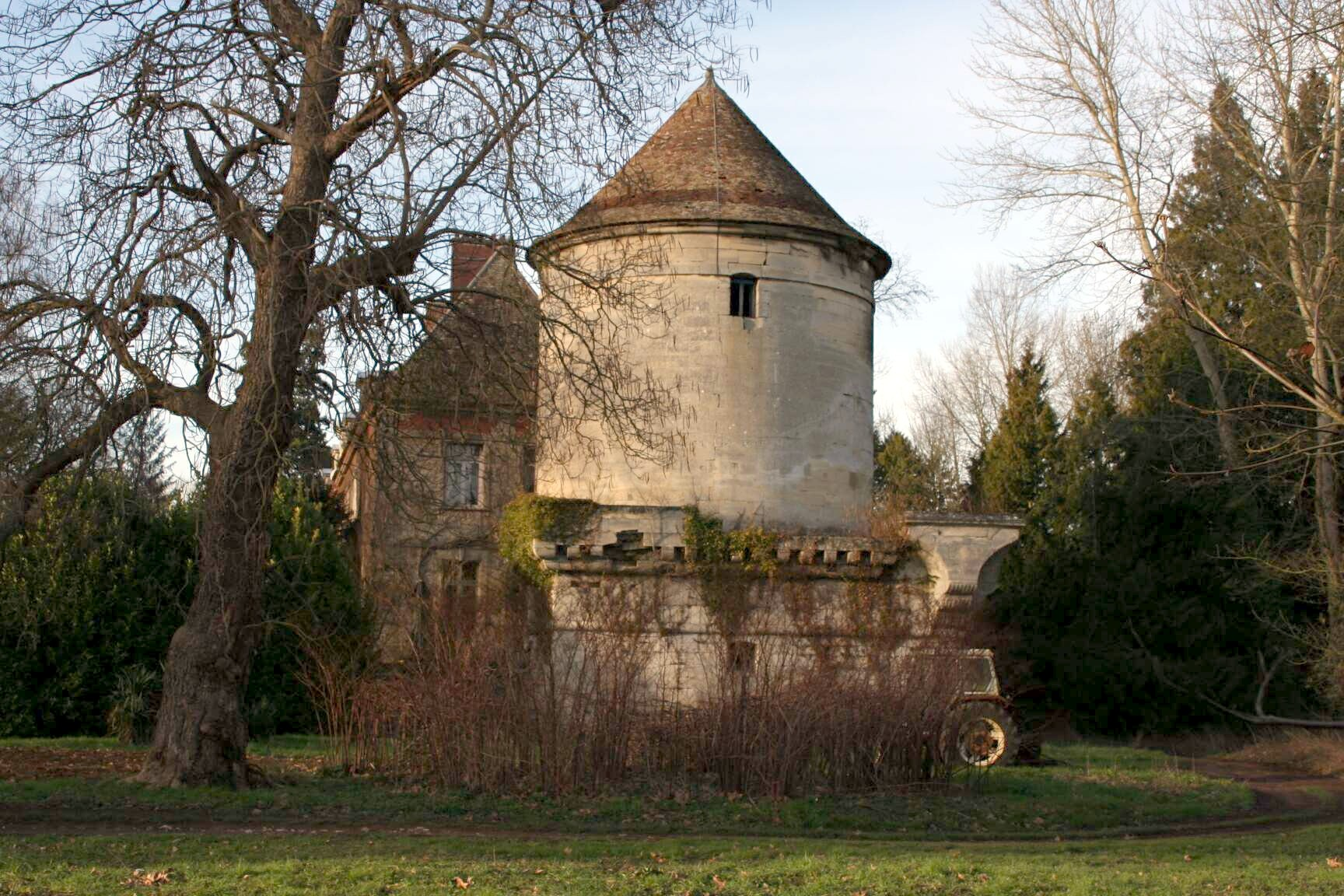

- Location within France
- 48.91389°N 1.84778°E
- Location: Maule, France

History
- Built: Late 16th century
- Built for: Nicolas de Harlay

Site notes
- Architectural style: Late Renaissance

Monument historique
- Official name: Château Saint-Vincent
- Designated: 07-31-1979
- Reference no.: PA00087528

The Château d'Agnou is a château, or manor house, situated in a place locally known as Bout d'Agnou in Maule, France. It is classified as a French historical monument.

== History ==
=== Medieval castle ===
In the 12th century, a castle called the Château Saint-Vincent was raised on the spot of the present manor. Built in the faubourg of Agnou, within the fiefdom of the Boutigny family, it stood outside the long walls that enclosed Maule. The Boutignys owned the castle from the 13th century on: first Hugues de Boutigny, Lord of Gavral, then his son Jean de Boutigny. However, it was later dismantled by order of King Louis VI. In 1357, the city was pillaged by Charles II of Navarre, who totally leveled the edifice. From then on, the barons of Maule lived in town, in houses constructed for them. This situation would change in the 16th century.

=== Manor House ===
The barony of Maule was held by the Morainvillier family until 1597, soon after which it would pass to the Harlays of Sancy, who had been acquiring local fiefdoms since 1578. The transfer occurred in 1602, when the title was obtained by Nicolas de Harlay, Lord of Sancy and Superintendent of Finances to King Henry IV.

Constructed in 1594, the Château d'Agnou was also called the Château du Hagnou or de Balagny. It owed its conception to Nicolas de Harlay, who wished to build a residence appropriate to his rank. It is likely that even Henry IV spent time there between hunting expeditions.

The marshes of the Bout d'Agnou area were drained in order to begin construction. Although the only actual result of the project was a single wing of the manor, measuring about 60 meters (200 feet), and a dovecote tower for keeping pigeons, the baron had much more ambitious plans. He wanted to build an immense quadrilateral structure flanked by four round towers.

Through his marriage to Marie Moreau on 15 February 1575, Nicolas de Harlay acquired the land of Grosbois in 1596 and began the construction of another manor there in 1597, which could explain why he never completed the first one.

The baron's heirs were unable to retain ownership of the Château d'Agnou, which was sold in 1638 to Claude de Bullion, Superintendent of Finances and Keeper of the Seals of France.

At the time of the French Revolution, the Château d'Agnou belonged to the Marquis de Boisse, who took the road to exile, leaving his manor to the vandalism of the revolutionaries. The ruins were sold in 1793 to Nicolas-François Fréret and finally recovered by the marquis in 1812.

In the 19th century, it belonged to the Maule Plainval family, and then to the Balagnys in 1876.

Used as a convalescent home during the First World War and occupied by the German Wehrmacht during the Second, it was left vacant through the 1960s. During the 1970s, it found new ownership and was gradually restored to its image of the 16th century. Today the property is under private co-ownership.

In 1979, it was used during the filming of Hugo Santiago's Écoute voir... (See Here My Love) starring Catherine Deneuve.

== Dovecote ==
A 16th-century construction, the manor's dovecote is a high cylindrical stone tower that has over 3,200 pigeon holes, which can hold over 6,000 pigeons. It is thus one of the largest in the region of Paris and one of the oldest in France. The nobility's privilege of raising pigeons was abolished in 1790 and the dovecote was vacated.

Today it houses owls and a family of kestrels.

== Gardens ==
The vast manor gardens, open to the public via paths and footbridges, included a vegetable garden, a fishpond, a greenhouse, a lake, and even an artificial island and cave. The gardens have since all but disappeared.

== Architecture ==
The single 60 m (200 ft) wing, partly reconstructed in the 17th century, possesses a regular façade crowned by gable windows with triangular pediments. Groin vaults can be observed on the ground floor, and a stone staircase descends into the gardens.

The dovecote tower, a corner structure separate from the manor, has a balcony whose corbeled parapet replicates the small defensive openings in medieval castle walls, known as machicolation.

Similar architectural features from the late 16th century can also be found at Ormesson and Grosbois.

== See also ==
- List of castles in the Île-de-France
- List of châteaux in the Île-de-France
- French Renaissance architecture
- Communes of Yvelines
