= Château de Nantouillet =

16th-century château in Île-de-France, France

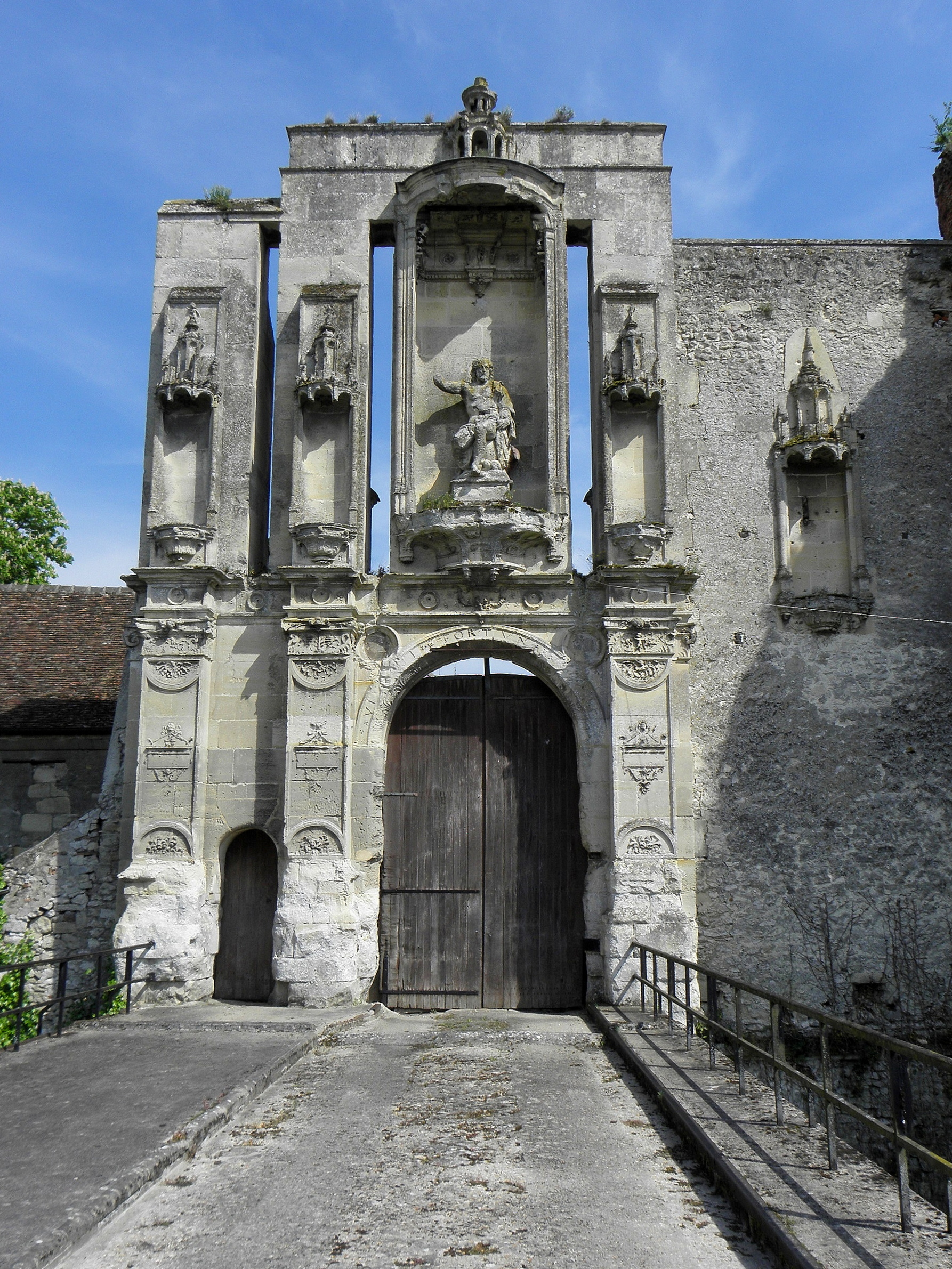
- Interactive map of the Château de Nantouillet area

General information
- Location: Nantouillet, Seine-et-Marne, France
- Coordinates: 49.0022°N 2.7035°E

Monument historique
- Designated: 1862

The Château de Nantouillet is a ruined sixteenth-century Renaissance château at Nantouillet, in the Seine-et-Marne department of the Île-de-France region of north-central France. It was built on the site of an earlier fortress by the French cardinal and politician Antoine Duprat, who died there on 15 July 1535. It was classed as a historic monument in 1862.

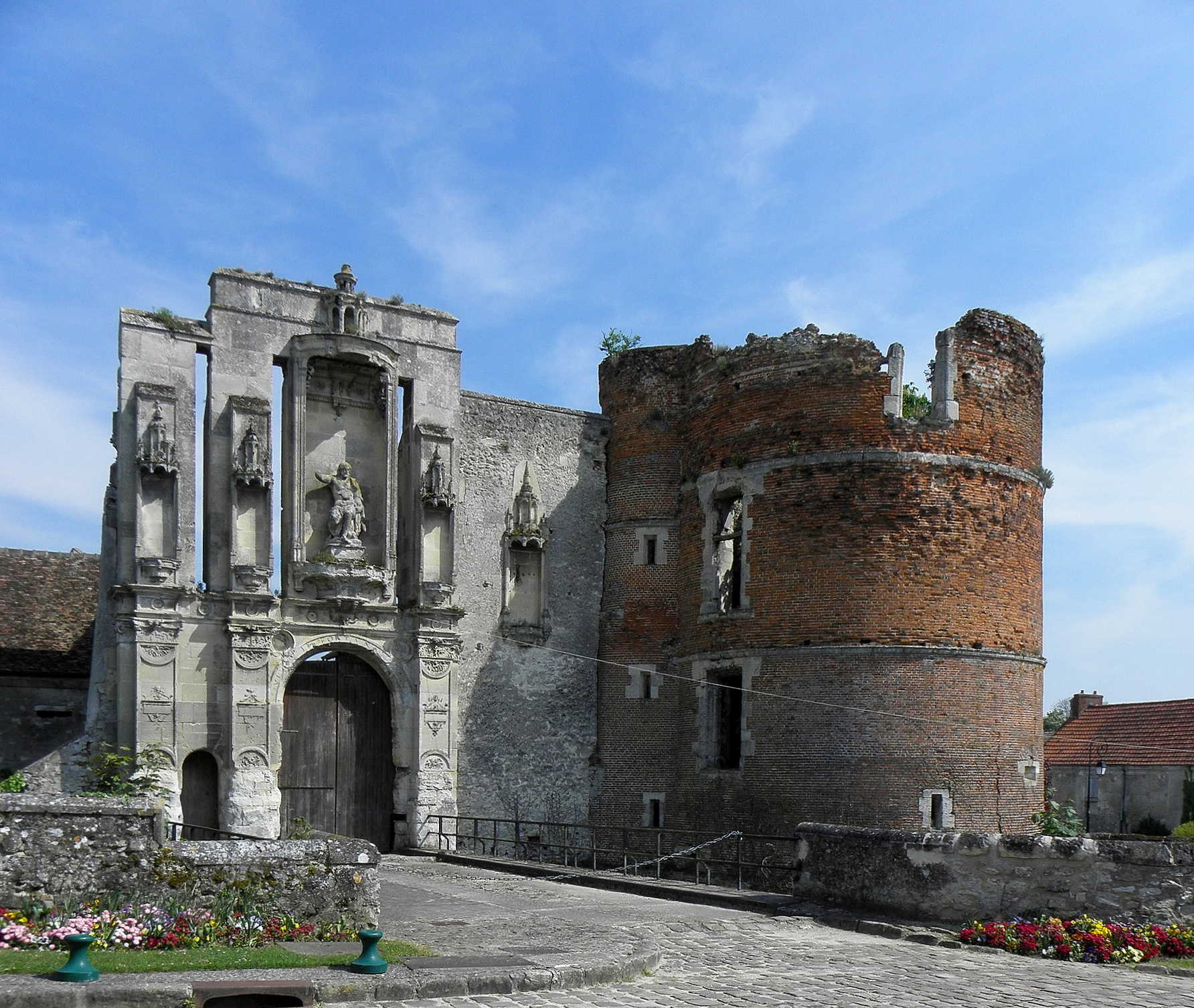

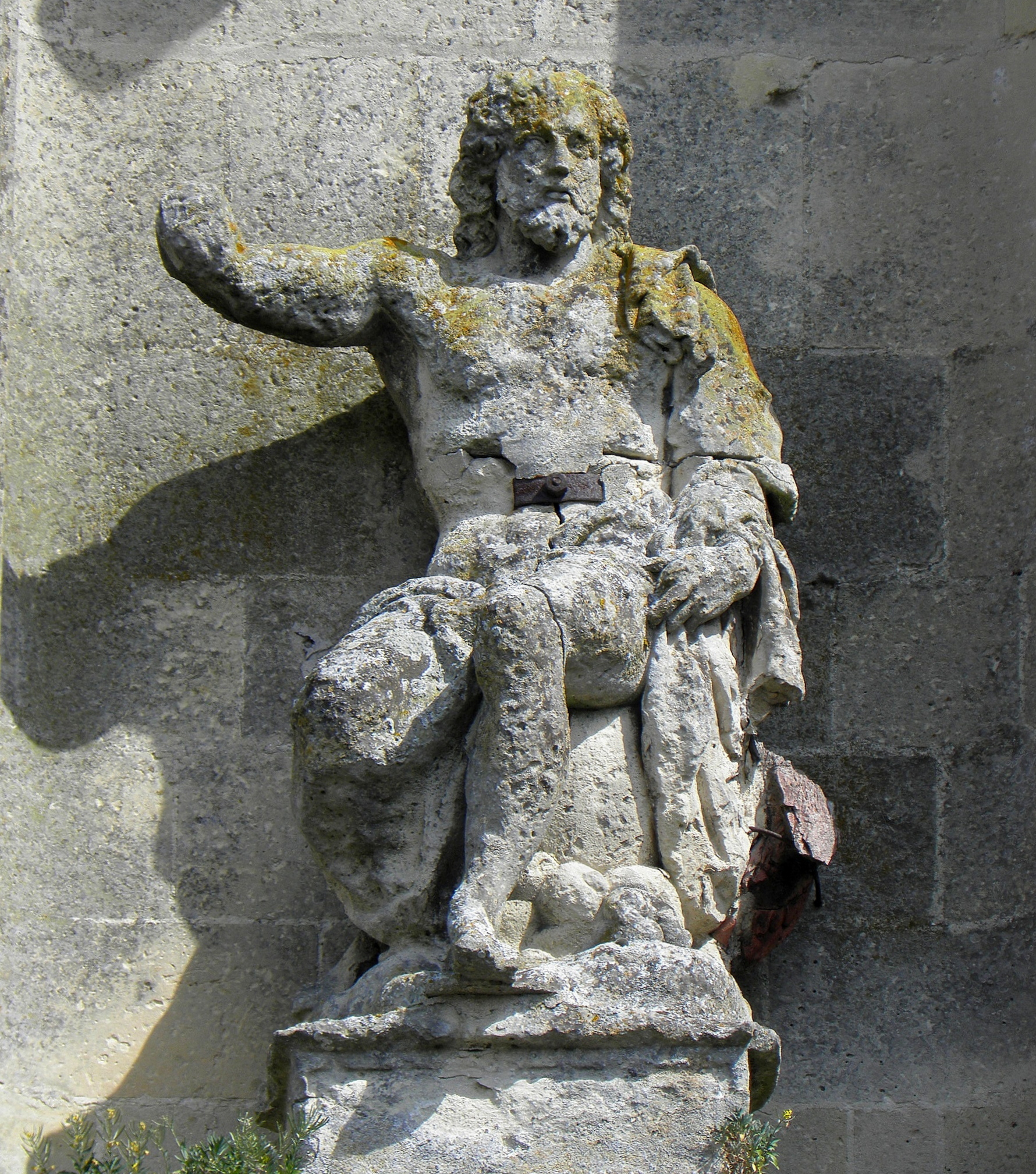

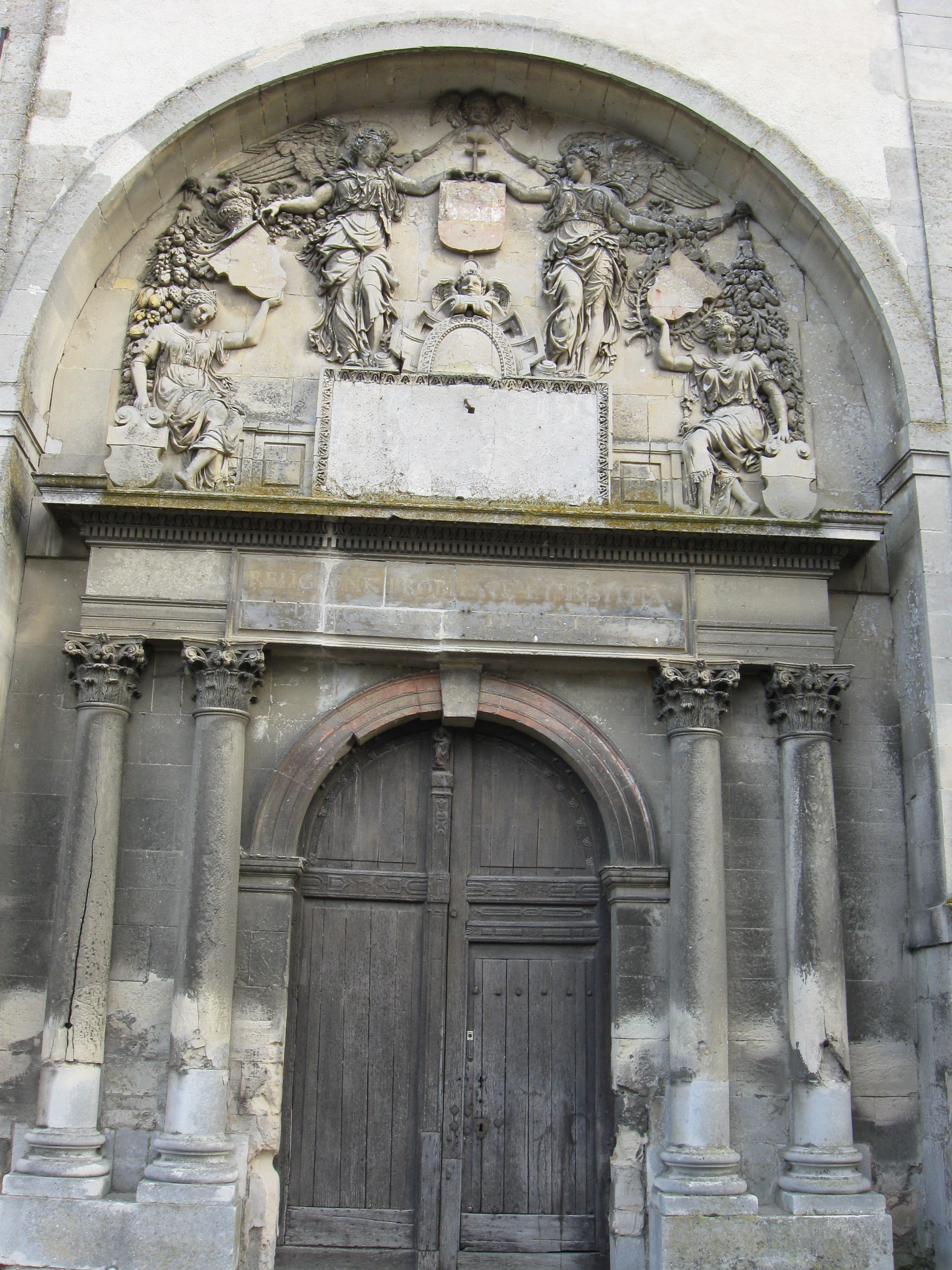

== See also ==
- List of castles in France
- List of châteaux in the Île-de-France
