= Morigny-Champigny =

Commune in Île-de-France, France

- Commune
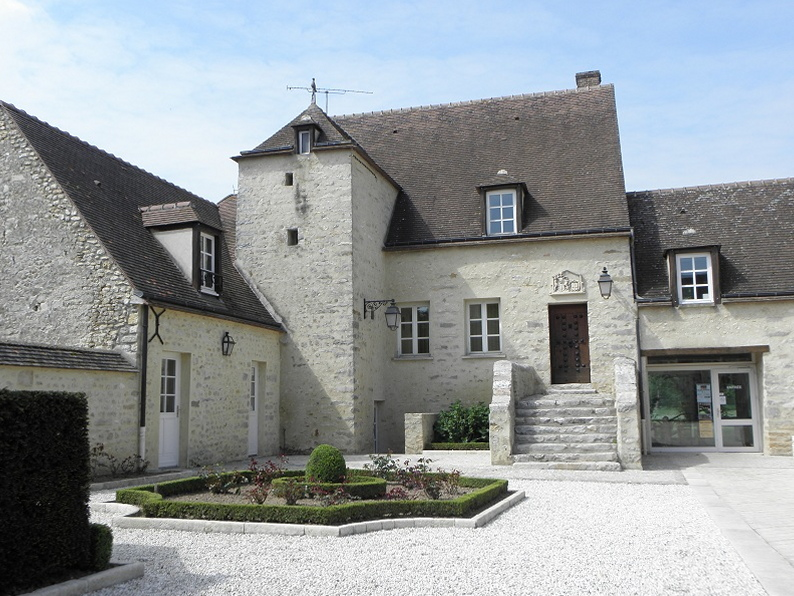
- The town hall in Morigny-Champigny

- Coat of arms
- Location of Morigny-Champigny
- Location within France Location within Île-de-France (region)
- Coordinates: 48°26′48″N 2°10′54″E
- Country: France
- Region: Île-de-France
- Department: Essonne
- Arrondissement: Étampes
- Canton: Étampes
- Intercommunality: CA Étampois Sud Essonne

Government
  - Mayor (2020–2026): Bernard Dionnet
- Area^{1}: 30.85 km^{2} (11.91 sq mi)
- Highest elevation: 156 m (512 ft)
- Lowest elevation: 63 m (207 ft)
- Population (2023): 4,412
  - Density: 143.0/km^{2} (370.4/sq mi)
- Time zone: UTC+01:00 (CET)
  - Summer (DST): UTC+02:00 (CEST)
- INSEE/Postal code: 91433 /91150
- ^{1} French Land Register data, which excludes lakes, ponds, glaciers > 1 km^{2} (0.386 sq mi or 247 acres) and river estuaries.

Morigny-Champigny (French pronunciation: [mɔʁiɲi ʃɑ̃piɲi]) is a commune in the Essonne department in Île-de-France in northern France.

== Geography ==
The village lies on the right bank of the Juine, which flows northward through the western part of the commune.

== Population ==
Historical population
| Year | Pop. | ±% p.a. |
|---|---|---|
| 1968 | 1,575 | — |
| 1975 | 2,165 | +4.65% |
| 1982 | 3,158 | +5.54% |
| 1990 | 3,656 | +1.85% |
| 1999 | 3,922 | +0.78% |
| 2007 | 4,246 | +1.00% |
| 2012 | 4,321 | +0.35% |
| 2017 | 4,346 | +0.12% |
| 2023 | 4,412 | +0.25% |
Source: INSEE

Inhabitants of Morigny-Champigny are known as Morignacois in French.

== See also ==
- Communes of the Essonne department
- Thiou of Morigny, French chronicler
