= Château de Chamarande =

17th-century château in Essonne, France

Coordinates: 48°30′46″N 2°13′15″E

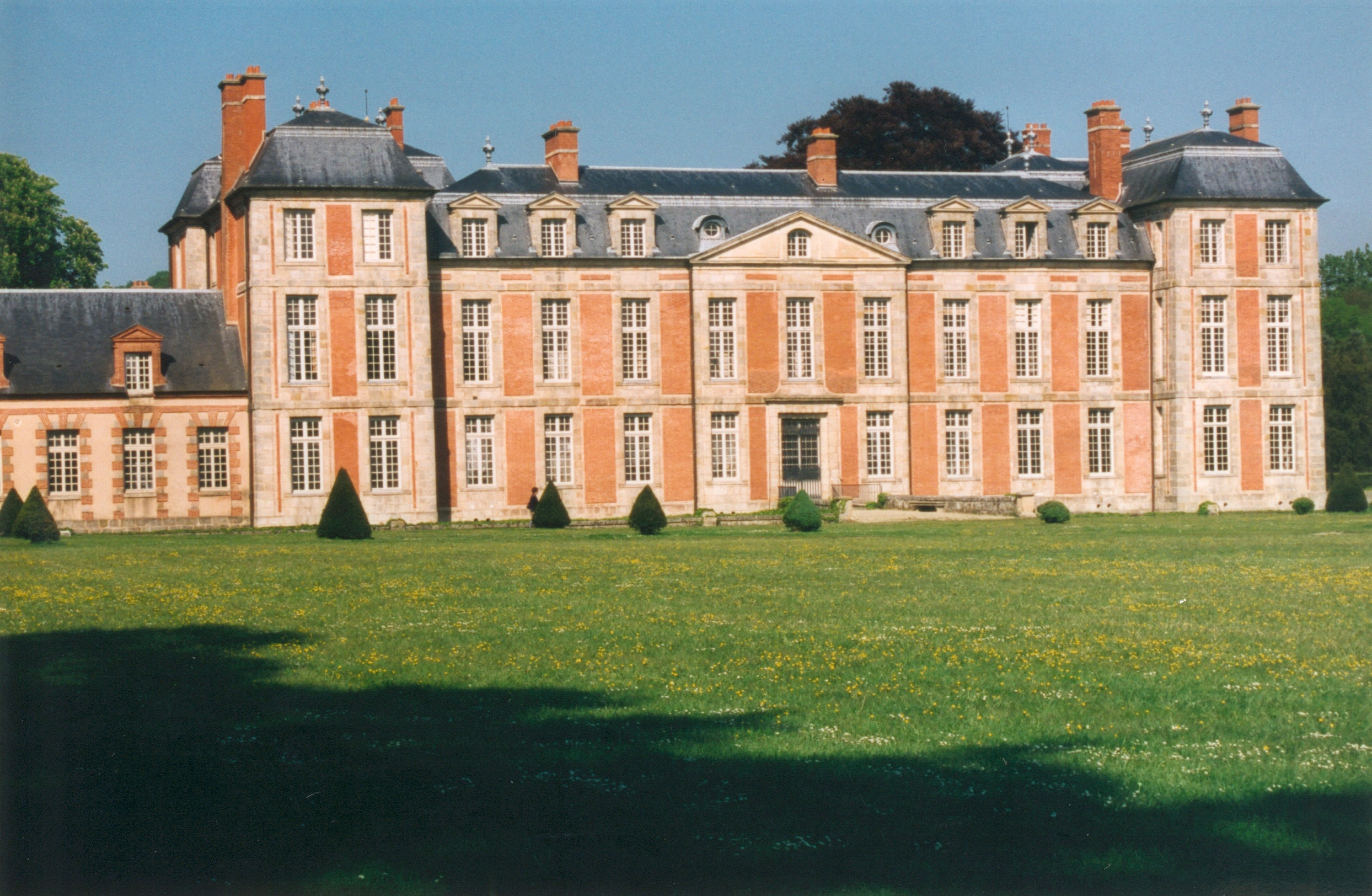
The south facade of the Château de Chamarande

The Château de Chamarande is a 17th-century French château in Chamarande, in the Essonne department.

== History ==
The first "castle" of this name was established at Bonnes around 811 by Arteld, missus dominicus and brother of Einhard, Charlemagne's biographer. However, excavations on the site have shown that the place was not fortified.

A fortified château was built in the 16th century, probably for François Hurault (prévôt des marchands de Paris and personal friend of king Henry IV), who in 1563 acquired the two seigneuries which make up the present estate and took up residence here. This castle corresponds to the present buildings of the commanderie. After the death of François Hurault in 1613, the château passed to his son Jean, who expanded the estate.

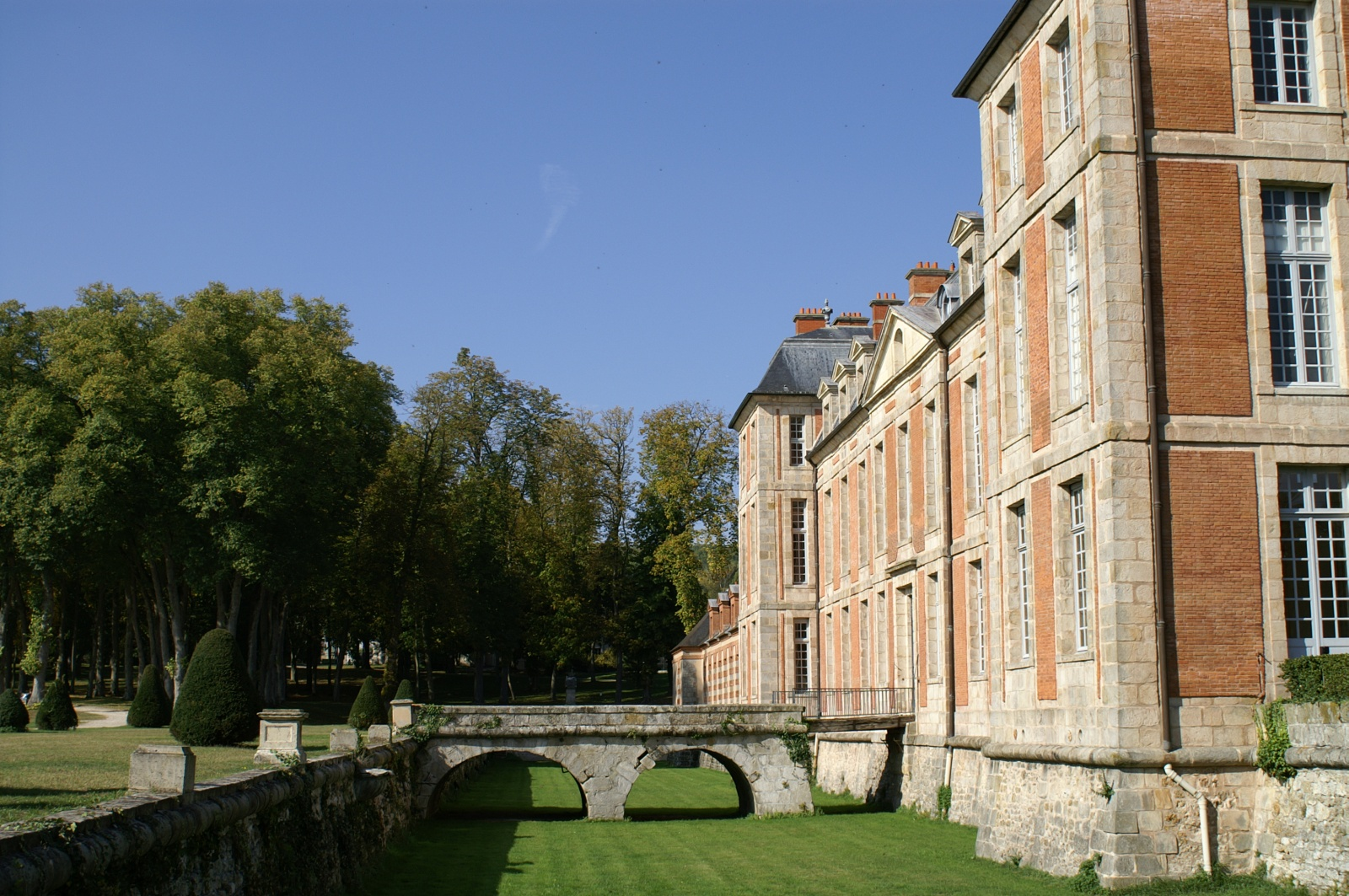
View of the moat

However, the château suffered in the Fronde and was in a poor state by the time it was sold in 1654 to Pierre Mérault, the former fermier des gabelles who had been promoted to a noble by buying a écuyership, who was also secretary to king Louis XIV. It was Mérault who built the present castle. Its design was formerly attributed to François Mansart without corroborating documentary evidence, but is now attributed to Nicolas de l'Espine. A rectangular building surrounded by a moat forms the living quarters, flanked on either side by the service wings The entrance to the main courtyard is flanked by two pavilions, with the left one containing the chapel. The estate was at the same time "ornamented with canals, lakes and fountains". André Le Nôtre helped design the park, though the dating and nature of his help are not known for certain.

In debt, Pierre Mérault sold the estate in 1684 to Clair Gilbert d'Ornaison known as Chamarande, top "valet de chambre" to Louis XIV. The year after the sale, Louis promoted Bonnes into the "county of Charamande" by letters patent. At d'Ornaison's death in 1737, the château passed to his first cousin and heir, Louis de Talaru, marquis de Chalmazel, maître d'hôtel of queen Marie Leszczyńska. The architect Pierre Contant d'Ivry worked on the château for de Talaru, building new service quarters beyond the secondary route near the village, and to the estate added an orangery, a belvédère, an oval bosquet for "Jeu de l'oie" with a temple of love at its centre and a cascatelle. He demolished the wall of the courtyard along the moat and put an ironwork gate with two lampholders in front of the bridge. He also modernised the interior decor, creating a little salon gros near the vestibule and the grand salon d'angle.

In the 1780s, a water feature was added, with an island bordered by bald cypresses from Louisiana at its centre—it is traditionally attributed to the painter and garden designer Hubert Robert. After the French Revolution, Louis-Justin, marquis de Talaru, bought the estate under the Consulate and carried out repairs, redesigning the park 'à l'anglaise'. Mayor of Chamarande, he lived at the Château until his death in 1850.

In 1852, the estate was sold to Pierre and René Robineau, and in 1857 it became the property of Victor Fialin, comte then duc de Persigny, interior minister to Napoléon III and French ambassador to the United Kingdom. He created a luxuriously-furnished gallery on the château's ground floor, built a fortified wall round the estate, completed the transformation of the park into the "à l'anglaise" style and planted exotic trees. New service buildings were added: a farm, stables, a bergerie, a birdhouse, a kennel, a new icehouse and a winter garden. Near the new gate was placed an obelisk inspired by the Songe de Poliphile, which probably referred to the love-affairs of Henry II with Diane de Poitiers. In 1862 (ten years before his death), Persigny held a fête at Chamarande for the birthday of empress Eugénie.

In 1876, the château was acquired by Aristide Boucicaut, founder of Bon Marché, who added a Renaissance-style dining room but died only a year after purchasing the château. His widow took it with her when she remarried in 1881, to the doctor Marie-Joseph-Laurent Amodru, mayor of Chamarande until 1922 and député for Seine-et-Oise. After 1913, the waterfall had copies of the river statues from the parc de Versailles added. From 1923 to 1951, the château was central to the creation of Scouting in France (the foundation of the regional heads of the Scouts et Guides de France is always called the Cham in reference to Chamarande). In 1950, the first À cœur joie festival took place at Chamarande, before becoming the Festival des Choralies at Vaison-la-Romaine.

In 1957, the last private owner was Auguste Mione, president of "La Construction moderne française", before the estate was bought in 1978, by the General Council of the Essonne.

== The estate today ==
The parc de Chamarande covers 98 hectares.

The commanderie (i.e. les communs) has since 1999 been the main store for the Essonne department's archives. An eight-floor underground silo below the château's courtyard allows up to 32 km of shelving, of which 11 km are presently in use.

In 2001, a contemporary art centre was set up at Chamarande at the instigation of Dominique Marchès, founder of the Vassivière art centre. He was its first director, followed by Judith Quentel (2005 to present). It has a permanent collection (entitled L'esprit des lieux), bought with a fund of the Essonne department and including works by Lilian Bourgeat, Erik Samakh ("flûtes solaires", in the park), Miguel Egana (Feuilles scies, 2001, in the park), Bert Theis (giant white crosses, in the park) and Philippe Ramette. The permanent sculpture park in the estate, plays off the existing features—the icehouse houses a sound installation by Céleste Boursier-Mougenot, and the orangery presents monograph exhibitions dedicated to young artists:

- 2007:
  - Sammy Engramer
  - David Évrard
- 2008:
  - Sylvain Rousseau

In season, from May to October, the centre hosts story-telling, music, dance and film festivals as well as gardening and heritage events in the park. The park (now one of the "Jardins remarquables") also hosts an important garden show in Île-de-France, as do the châteaux at Courson and Saint-Jean-de-Beauregard.

== Bibliography ==
- Jean-Marie Pérouse de Montclos (dir), Guide du patrimoine Ile-de-France, Paris, Hachette, 1992, p. 157
- Bénédicte Ramade, « Chamarande, de découvertes en surprises », L'Œil, Juillet-Août 2007, p. 78
