= Ollainville, Essonne =

Commune in Île-de-France, France

Ollainville
- Commune
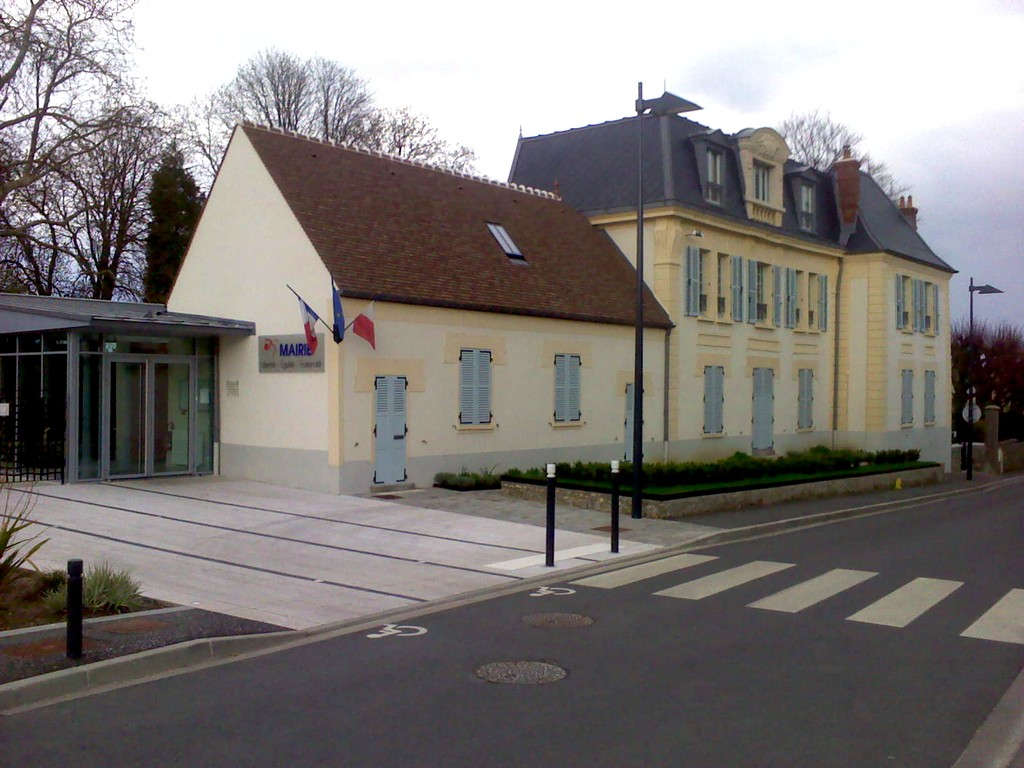
- The town hall in Ollainville

- Coat of arms
- Location of Ollainville
- Location within France Location within Île-de-France (region)
- Coordinates: 48°35′30″N 2°12′59″E
- Country: France
- Region: Île-de-France
- Department: Essonne
- Arrondissement: Palaiseau
- Canton: Arpajon
- Intercommunality: CA Cœur d'Essonne

Government
  - Mayor (2020–2026): Jean-Michel Giraudeau
- Area^{1}: 11.33 km^{2} (4.37 sq mi)
- Highest elevation: 168 m (551 ft)
- Lowest elevation: 46 m (151 ft)
- Population (2023): 5,455
  - Density: 481.5/km^{2} (1,247/sq mi)
- Time zone: UTC+01:00 (CET)
  - Summer (DST): UTC+02:00 (CEST)
- INSEE/Postal code: 91461 /91340
- ^{1} French Land Register data, which excludes lakes, ponds, glaciers > 1 km^{2} (0.386 sq mi or 247 acres) and river estuaries.

Ollainville (French pronunciation: [ɔlɛ̃vil]) is a commune in the Essonne department in Île-de-France in northern France.

== Population ==
Historical population
Year	Pop.	±% p.a.
1968	1,393	—
1975	1,876	+4.34%
1982	2,603	+4.79%
1990	3,555	+3.97%
1999	3,896	+1.02%
2007	4,565	+2.00%
2012	4,613	+0.21%
2017	4,722	+0.47%
2023	5,455	+2.43%
Source: INSEE

Inhabitants of Ollainville are known as Ollainvillois in French.

== See also ==
- Communes of the Essonne department
