= Thiou of Morigny =

12th century French chronicler

Thiou of Morigny (Latin: Teulfus Mauriniacensis) was a 12th-century French chronicler.

Thiou was a monk in Morigny, and abbot of Saint-Crépin de Soissons from 1118 to 1136.
