= Villeconin =

Commune in Île-de-France, France

- Commune
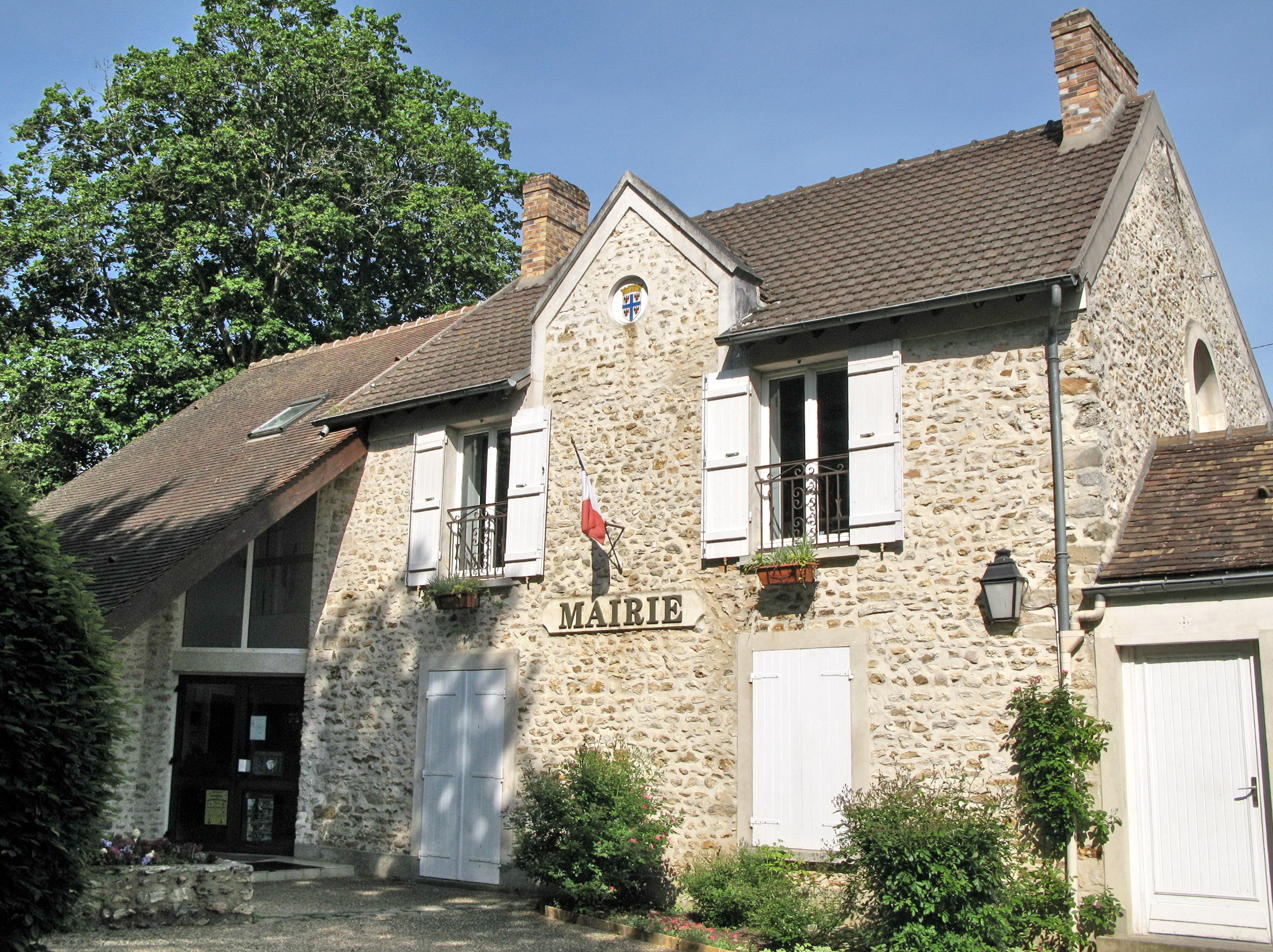
- The town hall in Villeconin

- Coat of arms
- Location of Villeconin
- Location within France Location within Île-de-France (region)
- Coordinates: 48°30′47″N 2°07′25″E
- Country: France
- Region: Île-de-France
- Department: Essonne
- Arrondissement: Étampes
- Canton: Dourdan
- Intercommunality: Entre Juine et Renarde

Government
  - Mayor (2020–2026): Jean-Marc Foucher
- Area^{1}: 14.45 km^{2} (5.58 sq mi)
- Highest elevation: 157 m (515 ft)
- Lowest elevation: 82 m (269 ft)
- Population (2023): 766
  - Density: 53.0/km^{2} (137/sq mi)
- Time zone: UTC+01:00 (CET)
  - Summer (DST): UTC+02:00 (CEST)
- INSEE/Postal code: 91662 /91580
- ^{1} French Land Register data, which excludes lakes, ponds, glaciers > 1 km^{2} (0.386 sq mi or 247 acres) and river estuaries.

Villeconin (French pronunciation: [vilkɔnɛ̃]) is a commune in the Essonne department, the region of Île-de-France, the north of France.

== See also ==
- Communes of the Essonne department
