= Château de Courson =

Château in Essonne, Île-de-France, France

Coordinates: 48°36′01″N 2°08′49″E

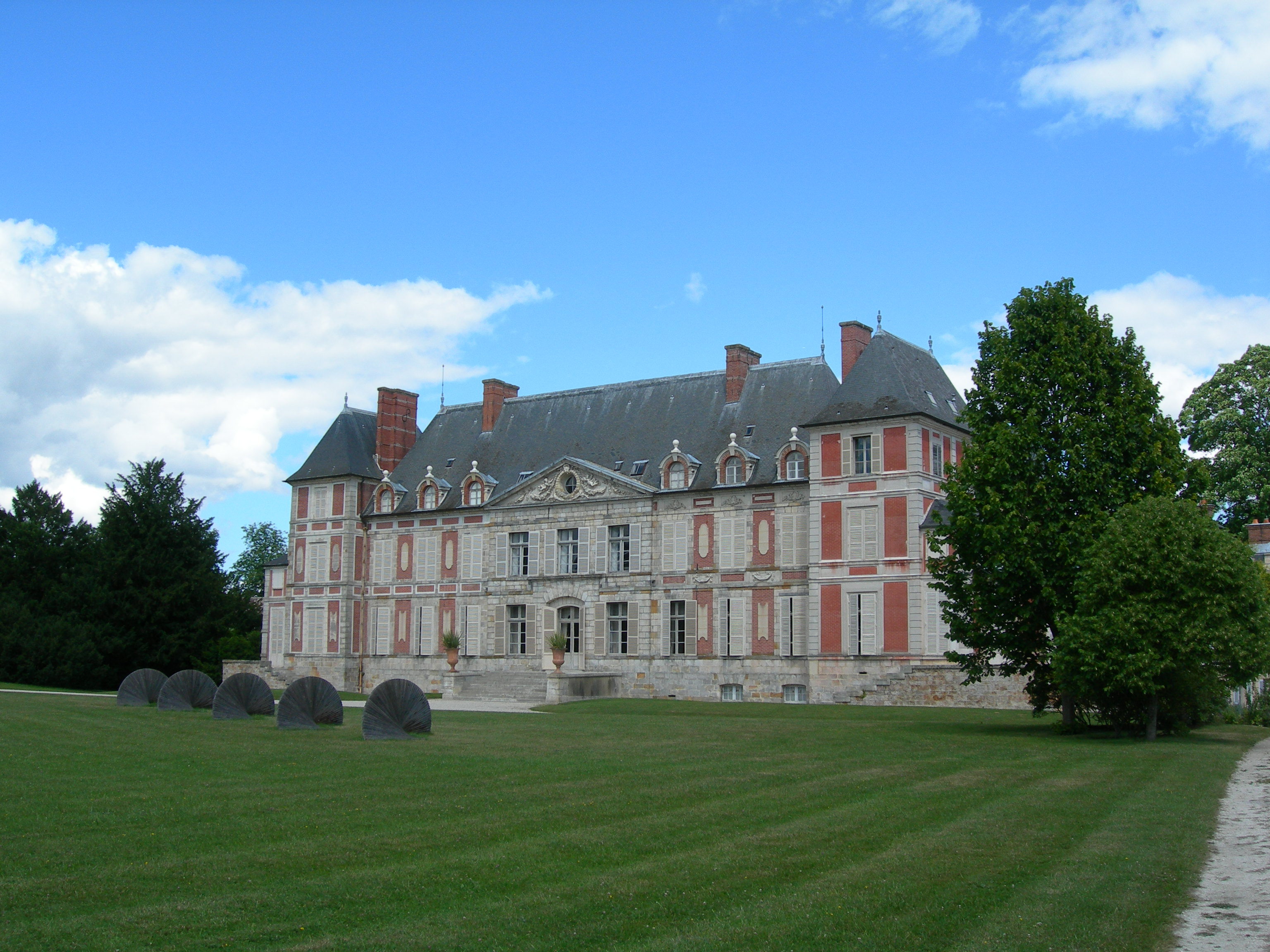
Château de Courson

The Château de Courson was built in 1676 in Courson-Monteloup, on the south-west outskirts of Paris, France. It is in the Essonne département of the Île-de-France région.

Originally the home of the Lamoignon family, the château has been in the family of de Nervaux-Loys since the 18th century. Its historic park was laid out in formal style by a pupil of André Le Nôtre in the 18th century. During the 19th century the gardens were twice remodelled, first around 1820 for the Duc de Padoue by the landscaper Berthault, then again around 1860 by the Bülhers, who laid out many French parks and gardens, including those of Rennes, Lyon and Bordeaux.

The documentary film Bring On the Night about rock musician Sting's first solo tour was filmed at the château in 1985.

It is now most famous as the venue for the Journées des Plantes de Courson. These extremely popular plant fairs were held in the grounds of the château in October from 1983 and also, from 1987, a spring plant fair was held in mid-May, until 2015, when the whole event transferred to the Domaine de Chantilly.

The château and park are still open for tours and other events.
