= Maule, Yvelines =

Maule
- Commune
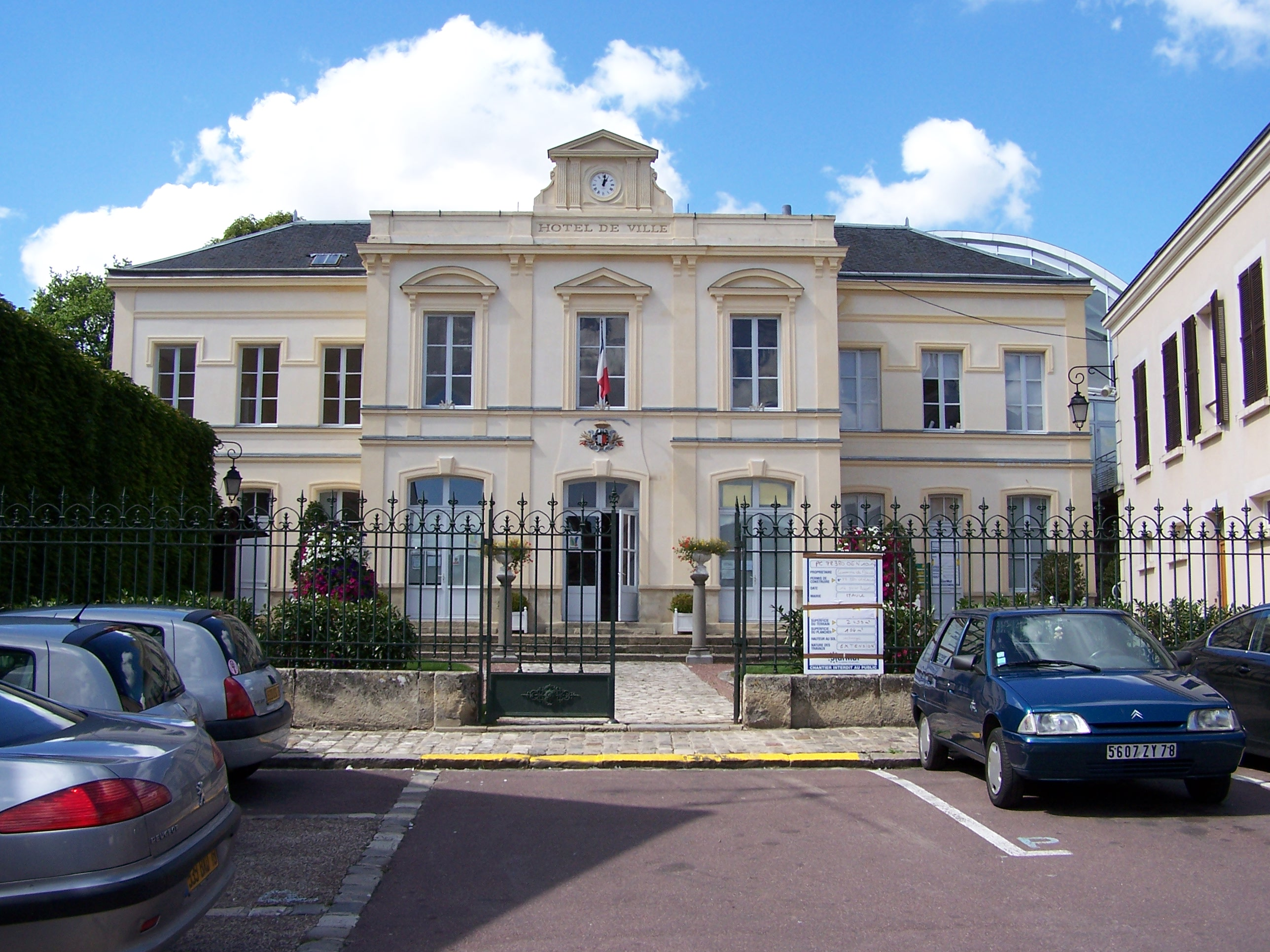
- Town hall

- Coat of arms
- Location of Maule
- Location within France Location within Île-de-France (region)
- Coordinates: 48°54′35″N 1°50′57″E
- Country: France
- Region: Île-de-France
- Department: Yvelines
- Arrondissement: Saint-Germain-en-Laye
- Canton: Aubergenville

Government
  - Mayor (2024–2026): Olivier Leprêtre
- Area^{1}: 17.30 km^{2} (6.68 sq mi)
- Elevation: 40 m (130 ft)
- Highest elevation: 178 m (584 ft)
- Lowest elevation: 27 m (89 ft)
- Population (2023): 6,083
  - Density: 351.6/km^{2} (910.7/sq mi)
- Time zone: UTC+01:00 (CET)
  - Summer (DST): UTC+02:00 (CEST)
- INSEE/Postal code: 78380 /78580
- ^{1} French Land Register data, which excludes lakes, ponds, glaciers > 1 km^{2} (0.386 sq mi or 247 acres) and river estuaries.

Maule (French pronunciation: [mol]) is a commune in the Yvelines department in the Île-de-France in north-central France.

== Population ==
Historical population
Year	Pop.	±% p.a.
1968	3,529	—
1975	4,185	+2.47%
1982	5,360	+3.60%
1990	5,751	+0.88%
1999	5,863	+0.21%
2007	5,865	+0.00%
2012	5,711	−0.53%
2017	5,854	+0.50%
2023	6,083	+0.64%
Source: INSEE

== Twin towns ==
- Carnoustie, Angus, Scotland

== See also ==
- Communes of the Yvelines department
