= Nantouillet =

- Commune
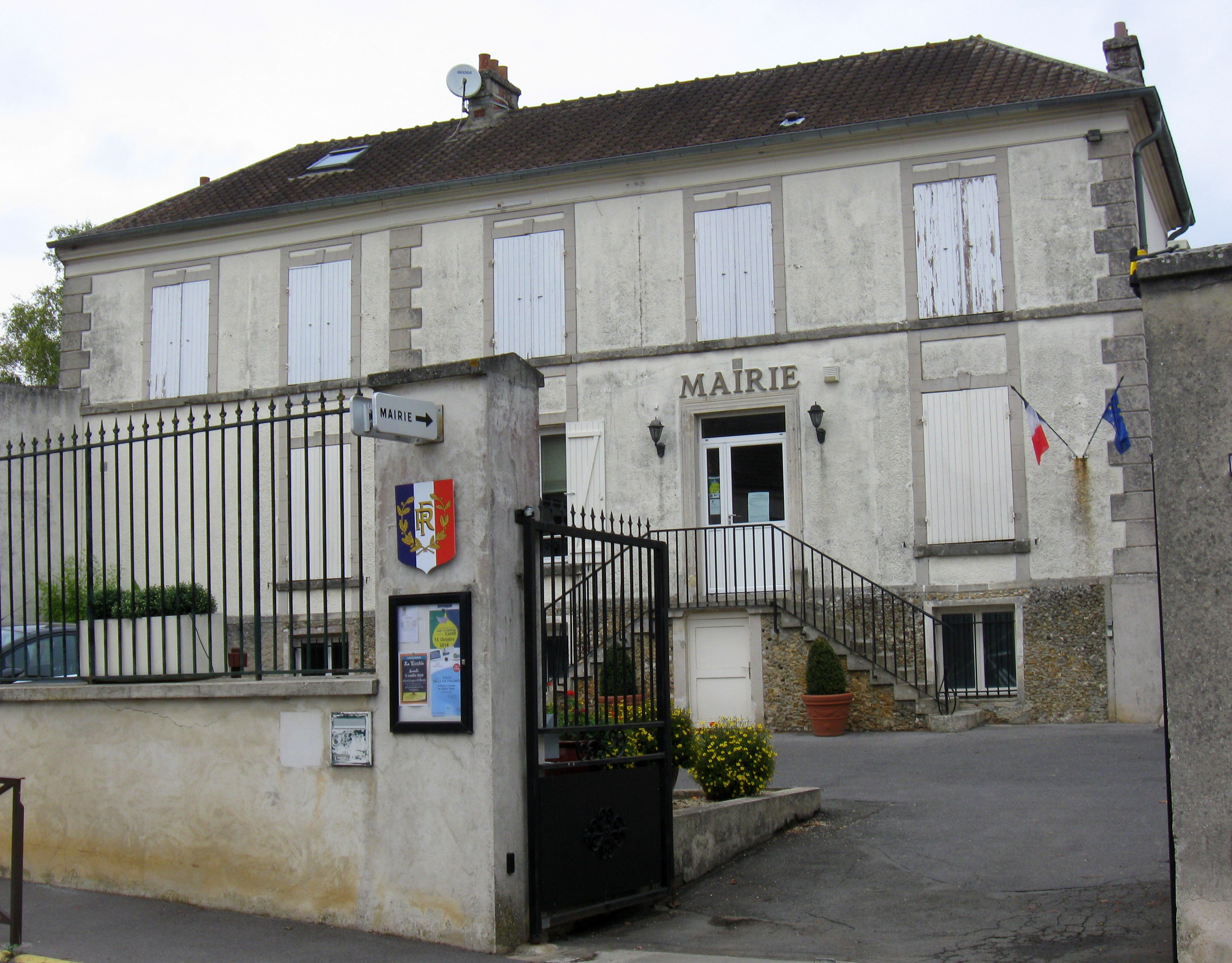
- The town hall of Nantouillet

- Coat of arms

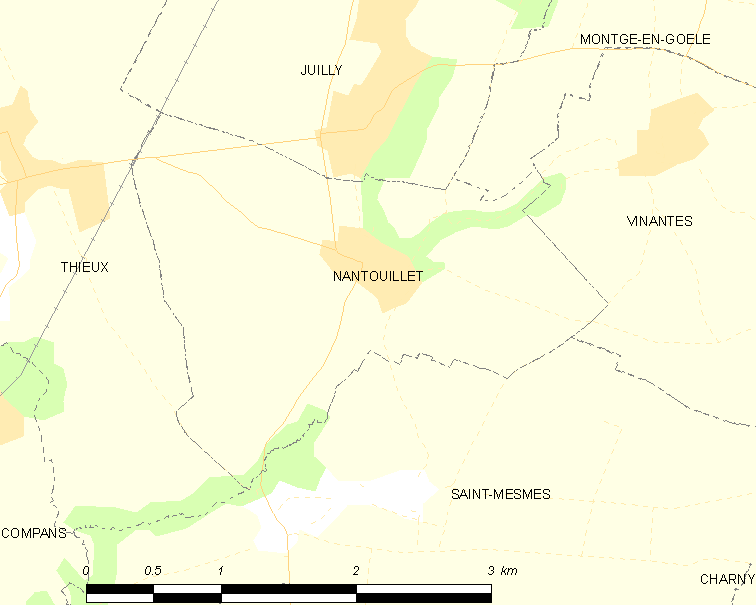
- Location of Nantouillet
- Location within France Location within Île-de-France (region)
- Coordinates: 49°00′08″N 2°42′13″E
- Country: France
- Region: Île-de-France
- Department: Seine-et-Marne
- Arrondissement: Meaux
- Canton: Mitry-Mory
- Intercommunality: CC Plaines et Monts de France

Government
  - Mayor (2020–2026): Yannik Urbaniak
- Area^{1}: 5.15 km^{2} (1.99 sq mi)
- Highest elevation: 118 m (387 ft)
- Lowest elevation: 63 m (207 ft)
- Population (2023): 302
  - Density: 58.6/km^{2} (152/sq mi)
- Time zone: UTC+01:00 (CET)
  - Summer (DST): UTC+02:00 (CEST)
- INSEE/Postal code: 77332 /77230
- ^{1} French Land Register data, which excludes lakes, ponds, glaciers > 1 km^{2} (0.386 sq mi or 247 acres) and river estuaries.

Nantouillet (French pronunciation: [nɑ̃tujɛ]) is a commune in the Seine-et-Marne department in the Île-de-France region in north-central France.

== Demographics ==
The inhabitants are called the Nantolétains.

== See also ==
- Communes of the Seine-et-Marne department
