= Canton of Donnemarie-Dontilly =

Coordinates: 48°28′46″N 3°08′15″E

Donnemarie-Dontilly
- Former canton
- Interactive map of Donnemarie-Dontilly
- Country: France
- Region: Île-de-France
- Department: Seine-et-Marne
- No. of communes: {{{nbcomm}}}
- Disbanded: 2015
- Area: 179.76 km^{2} (69.41 sq mi)
- Population (2012): 10,853
  - Density: 60.375/km^{2} (156.37/sq mi)

The canton of Donnemarie-Dontilly is a French former administrative division, located in the arrondissement of Provins, in the Seine-et-Marne département (Île-de-France région). It was disbanded following the French canton reorganisation which came into effect in March 2015. It consisted of 19 communes, which joined the canton of Provins in 2015.

== Demographics ==
Historical population
Year	Pop.	±%
1999	9,708	—
2006	10,315	+6.3%
2012	10,853	+5.2%

== Composition ==
The canton of Donnemarie-Dontilly was composed of 19 communes:

- Cessoy-en-Montois
- Châtenay-sur-Seine
- Coutençon
- Donnemarie-Dontilly
- Égligny
- Gurcy-le-Châtel
- Jutigny
- Lizines
- Luisetaines
- Meigneux
- Mons-en-Montois
- Montigny-Lencoup
- Paroy
- Savins
- Sigy
- Sognolles-en-Montois
- Thénisy
- Villeneuve-les-Bordes
- Vimpelles

== See also ==
- Cantons of the Seine-et-Marne department
- Communes of the Seine-et-Marne department
