= Communauté de communes du Montois =

Coordinates: 48.4703°N 3.0861°E

Montois
- Former communauté de communes
- Country: France
- Region: Île-de-France
- Department: Seine-et-Marne
- No. of communes: {{{nbcomm}}}
- Established: December 1998
- Disbanded: 2014
- Area: 179.76 km^{2} (69.41 sq mi)
- Population (1999): 9,810
  - Density: 54.6/km^{2} (141/sq mi)

The Communauté de communes du Montois is a former federation of municipalities (communauté de communes) in the Seine-et-Marne département and in the Île-de-France région of France. It was created in December 1998. It was merged into the new Communauté de communes de la Bassée - Montois in January 2014.

== Composition ==
The Communauté de communes comprised the following communes:

- Cessoy-en-Montois
- Châtenay-sur-Seine
- Coutençon
- Donnemarie-Dontilly
- Égligny
- Gurcy-le-Châtel
- Jutigny
- Lizines
- Luisetaines
- Meigneux
- Mons-en-Montois
- Montigny-Lencoup
- Paroy
- Savins
- Sigy
- Sognolles-en-Montois
- Thénisy
- Villeneuve-les-Bordes
- Vimpelles

== See also ==
- Communes of the Seine-et-Marne department
