= Sigy =

Sigy may refer to:

== Places ==
- Sigy, Seine-et-Marne, France
- Sigy-en-Bray, France
- Sigy-le-Châtel, France

== Other ==
- Sigy (horse) (foaled 1976), French racehorse and broodmare
- Prix Sigy, French horse race
