= Montois =

Montois may refer to:

- Le Montois, geographic area approximated by the former communauté de communes du Montois, Seine-et-Marne, France
- Adjective, demonym, and dialect of:
  - Mons, Belgium, city
  - Mont-de-Marsan, commune in Landes, France
    - Stade Montois rugby club
    - Stade Montois (football)
  - Mont Saint-Michel, island commune in Manche, France
- Montois-la-Montagne, commune in Moselle, France
- Henri Montois, Belgian architect

== See also ==
- Ville-au-Montois, commune in Meurthe-et-Moselle, France
- Maurupt-le-Montois, commune in Marne, France
