= Château de Sigy =

Modernised castle in France

Coordinates: 48°28′49″N 3°10′25″E

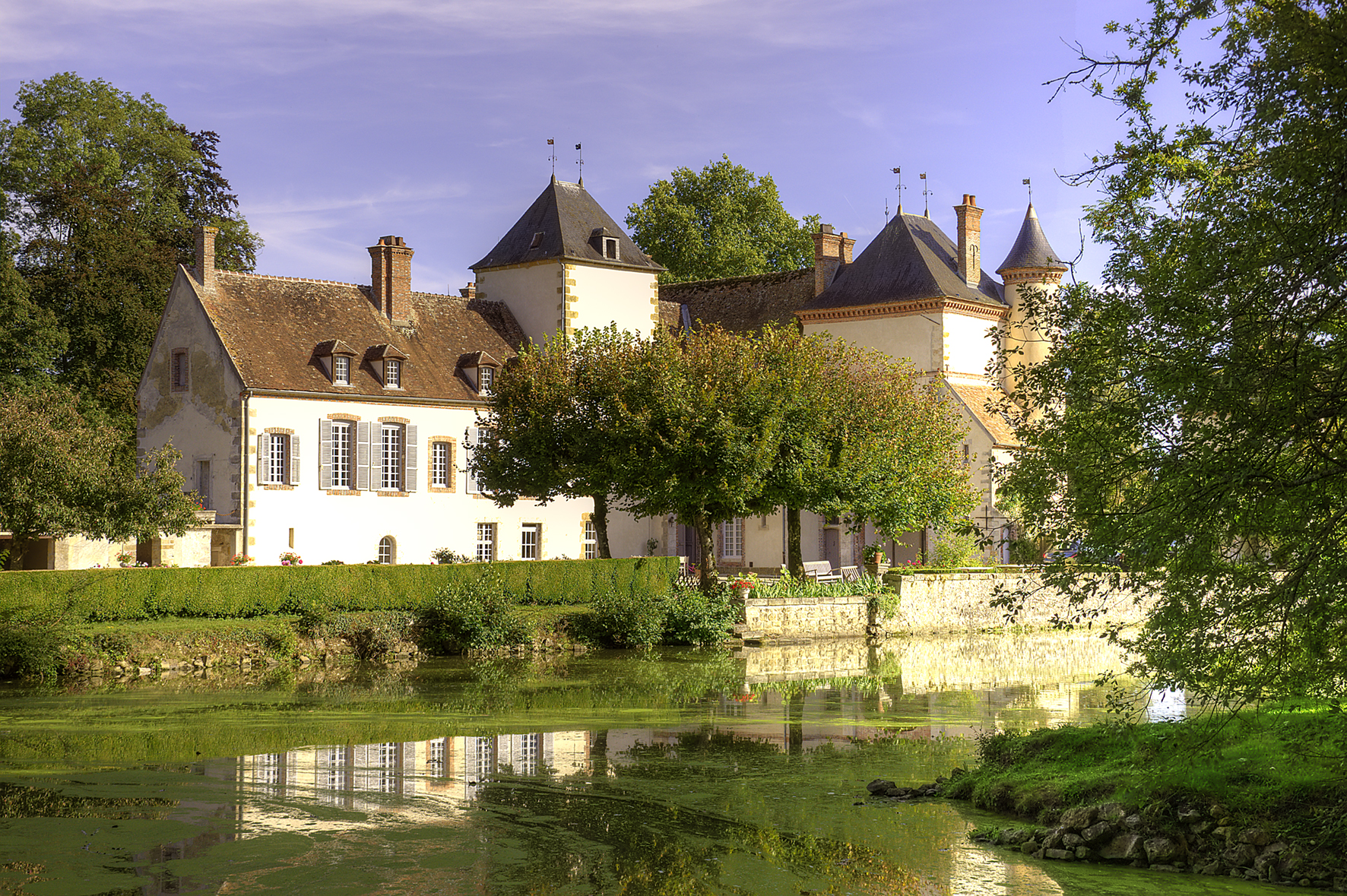
View of the Sigy Castle

The Château de Sigy is a modernised castle in the commune of Sigy in the Seine-et-Marne département of France.

The castle dates originally from the 14th century, though much altered in the 15th, 17th and 18th centuries. Of note are the walls and roofs of the castle and its outbuildings, including two towers, the gardens surrounded by moats and two bridges across the moats. Inside, the central staircase with wooden balusters is beneath a dome. In the north wing, the grand bedroom and the "Trudaine" bedroom contain magnificent chimneys.

Privately owned, the castle has been listed since 1984 as a monument historique by the French Ministry of Culture.

== See also ==
- List of castles in France
