= Wladimir Brunet de Presle =

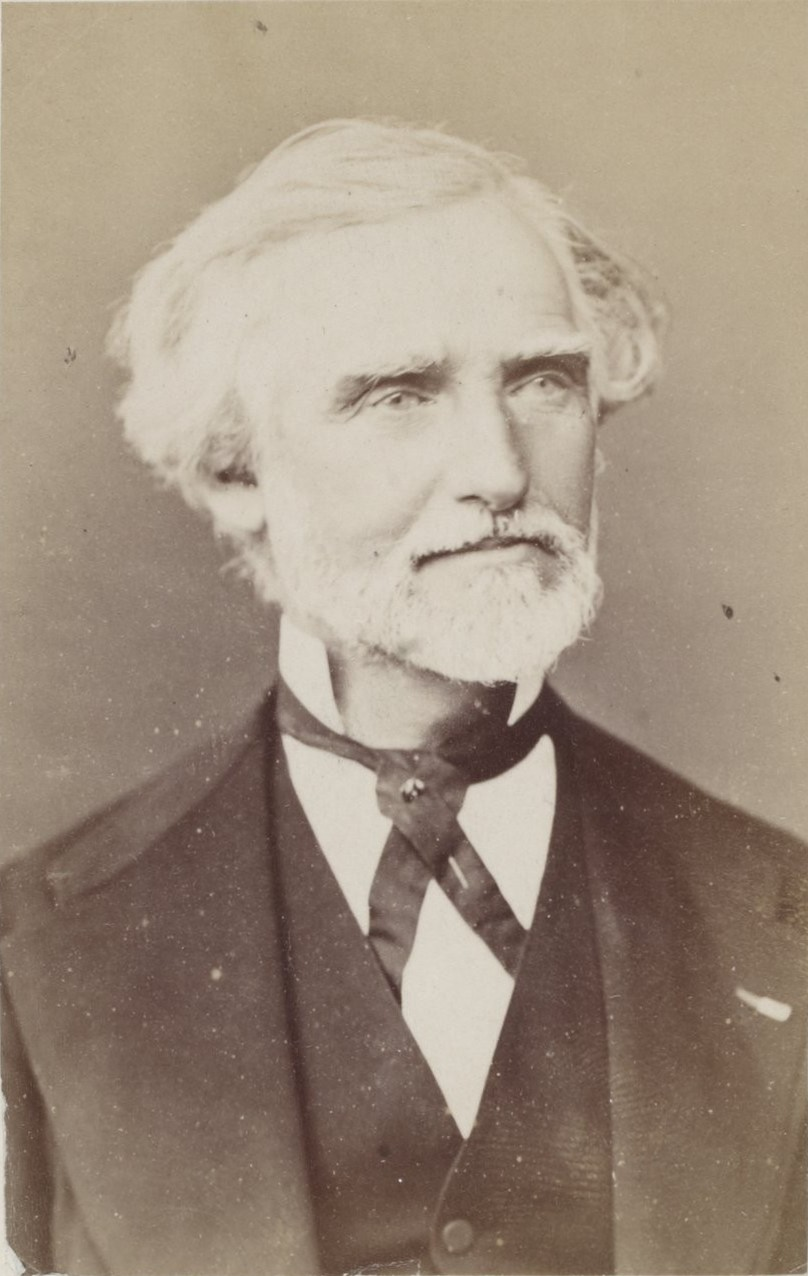
- Born: Charles Marie Wladimir Brunet; 10 November 1809; Paris
- Died: 12 September 1875 (aged 65); Parouzeau (Seine-et-Marne)
- Occupations: Philologist; Hellenist
- Spouse: Émilie de Presle

Charles Marie Wladimir Brunet de Presle, né Brunet (10 November 1809 – 12 September 1875) was a 19th-century French Hellenist, Byzantinist and historian. He was also a papyrologist, a translator of modern Greek and an academician.

== Publications ==
- 1828: Γνώμαι και σκέψεις ηθικαί του δουκός Δε-Λα-Ροσφουκώ (Maximes et réflexions morales du duc de La Rochefoucauld. Traduites en grec moderne par Wladimir Brunet, revues et corrigées par Georges Théocharopoulos de Patras, avec une traduction anglaise en regard. F. Didot, Paris. Read online
- 1845: Recherches sur les établissements des Grecs en Sicile. Imprimerie royale, Paris.
- 1850: L'Examen critique de la succession des dynasties égyptiennes. Didot, Klincksieck, Paris.
- 1852: Mémoire sur le Sérapéum de Memphis, in Mémoires présentés par divers savants à l'Académie des Inscriptions et Belles-Lettres de l'Institut de France, sér. 1, p. 552–576.
- Michael Attaleiates, Historia. Opus a Wladimiro Bruneto de Presle, Instituti Gallici socio, inventum, descriptum, correctum recognovit Immanuel Bekker. Bonn, 1853 (Corpus Scriptorum Historiae Byzantinae), Read online
- 1856: Extrait d'une notice sur les tombeaux des empereurs de Constantinople lu dans la séance publique annuelle du 8 août 1856. Impr. de F. Didot frères, fils et Cie, Paris.
- 1860: La Grèce depuis la conquête romaine jusqu'à nos jours. F. Didot frères, Paris, Read online
- 1865: Wladimir Brunet de Presle et Émile Egger: Les Papyrus grecs du musée du Louvre et de la bibliothèque impériale. Paris.

== Bibliography ==
- Herni Wallon : Notice sur la vie et les travaux de Charles-Marie-Wladimir Brunet de Presle. In: Comptes rendus des séances de l'Académie des Inscriptions et Belles-Lettres n°48, 1904, n° 6, (p. 617–666), Read online
- Émile Egger : Paroles prononcées aux funérailles de M. Brunet de Presle, le 14 septembre 1875. Académie des inscriptions et belles-lettres, Paris 1875.
- Αλέξης Πολίτης (Alexis Politis) (éd.) : Κατάλοιπα Fauriel και Brunet de Presle. 1 : Τα "νεοελληνικά" του Claude Fauriel; 2 : Η Συλλογή τραγουδιών του W. Brunet de Presle: αναλυτικός κατάλογος. Κέντρο Νεοελληνικών Ερευνών Ε.Ι.Ε., Athen 1980.
- (in German) Christine Beinlich-Seeber : Bibliographie Altägypten 1822–1946, vol. I, Otto Harrassowitz Verlag, Wiesbaden, 1998 (Ägyptologische Abhandlungen, t. 61), (p. 353): bibliographie et recensions, Read online
