= Château de Sigy-le-Châtel =

Ruined castle in Saône-et-Loire, France

Coordinates: 46°33′22″N 4°34′24″E

The Château de Sigy-le-Châtel is a ruined castle in the commune of Sigy-le-Châtel in the Saône-et-Loire département of France.

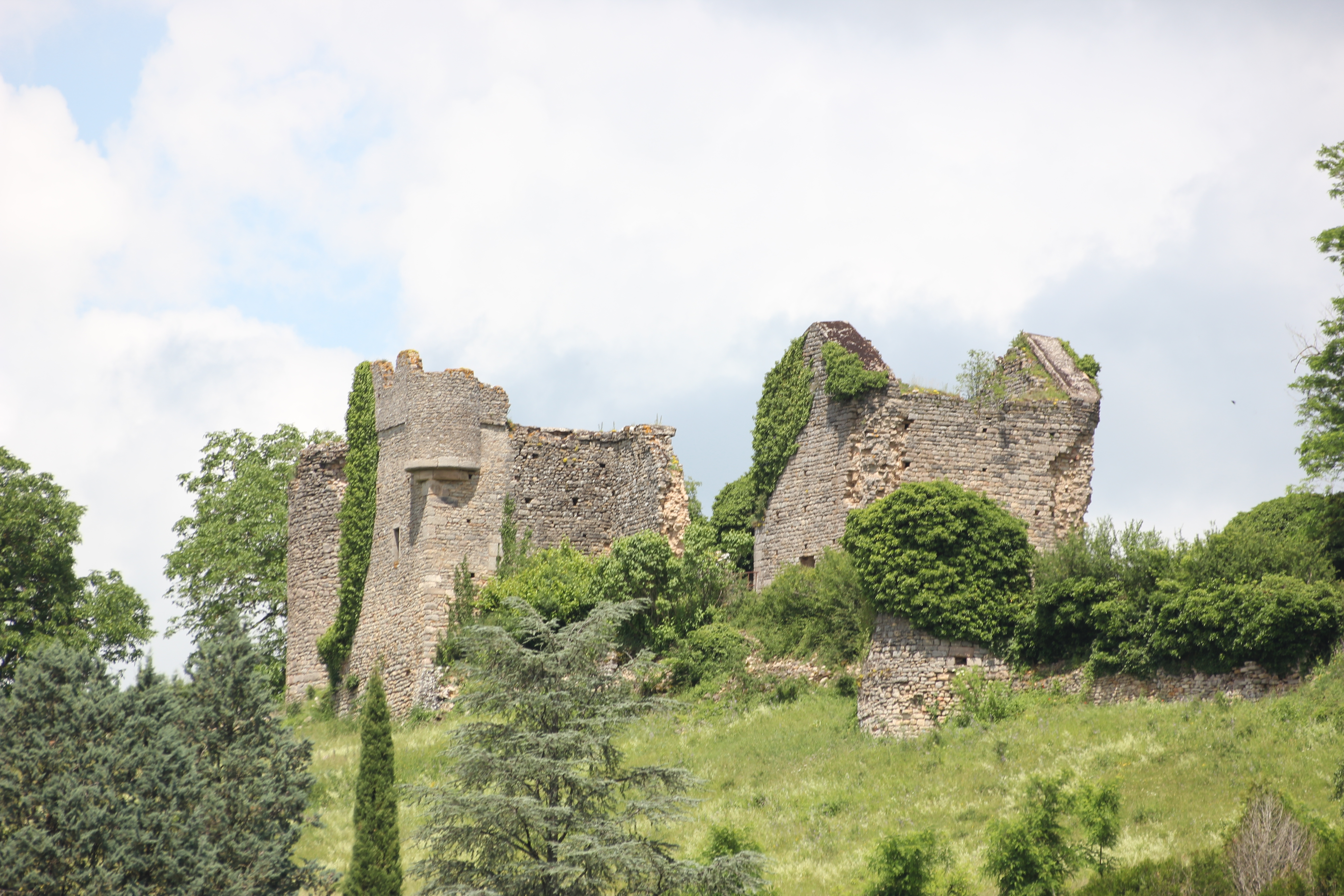
Château de Sigy-le-Châtel

== Description ==
The castle was built on a rocky outcrop dominating a pass.

It is one of the oldest castles in Mâconnais. It consisted of a large irregularly shaped enceinte made of thick curtain walls. The entrance, to the north towards the plateau, was flanked by two fortified semicircular towers.

The only remains are some stretches of wall, the bases of two large circular towers pierced by cannon positions and, at the western end, the corner of a brick building with a bartizan.

The castle is privately owned and not open to the public.

== History ==
Arms of Valois-Angoulême

Origins

- 10th century : earliest record of the castle

House of Luzy

- 1203: Renaud de Luzy was seigneur
- 12th century : reconstruction undertaken

House of Sauzet

- 1266: Archambaud de Sauzet, seigneur de Chanay was the husband of Sybille de Luzy, dame de Sigy
- End of 13th century: Humbert de Sauzet, son of the preceding, succeeded them
- 1314: Alix, widow or sister of the preceding, became dame de Sigy

House of Marzé

- 1361: Jean de Marzé was seigneur

House of Trezettes

- 1373: Hugues de Trezettes was the husband of Guillemette de Marzé

House of La Guiche

- 1560: Philibert de La Guiche was seigneur

House of Valois-Angoulême

- 1629: Marie-Henriette de La Guiche, daughter of the preceding, married Louis-Emmanuel d'Angoulême, grandson of King Charles IX; the fortress was then abandoned and returned, by successions, to the La Guiche family
- 1794: Amable-Charles, marquis de La Guiche, last seigneur of Sigy, guillotined

=== Other arms ===
- Luzy: De gueules au chevron d'argent, accompagné de trois étoiles d'or, 2 en chef et 1 en pointe

== See also ==
- List of castles in France

== Bibliography ==
- F. Perraud, Le Mâconnais Historique, (1921)
