= Sigy-le-Châtel =

- Commune
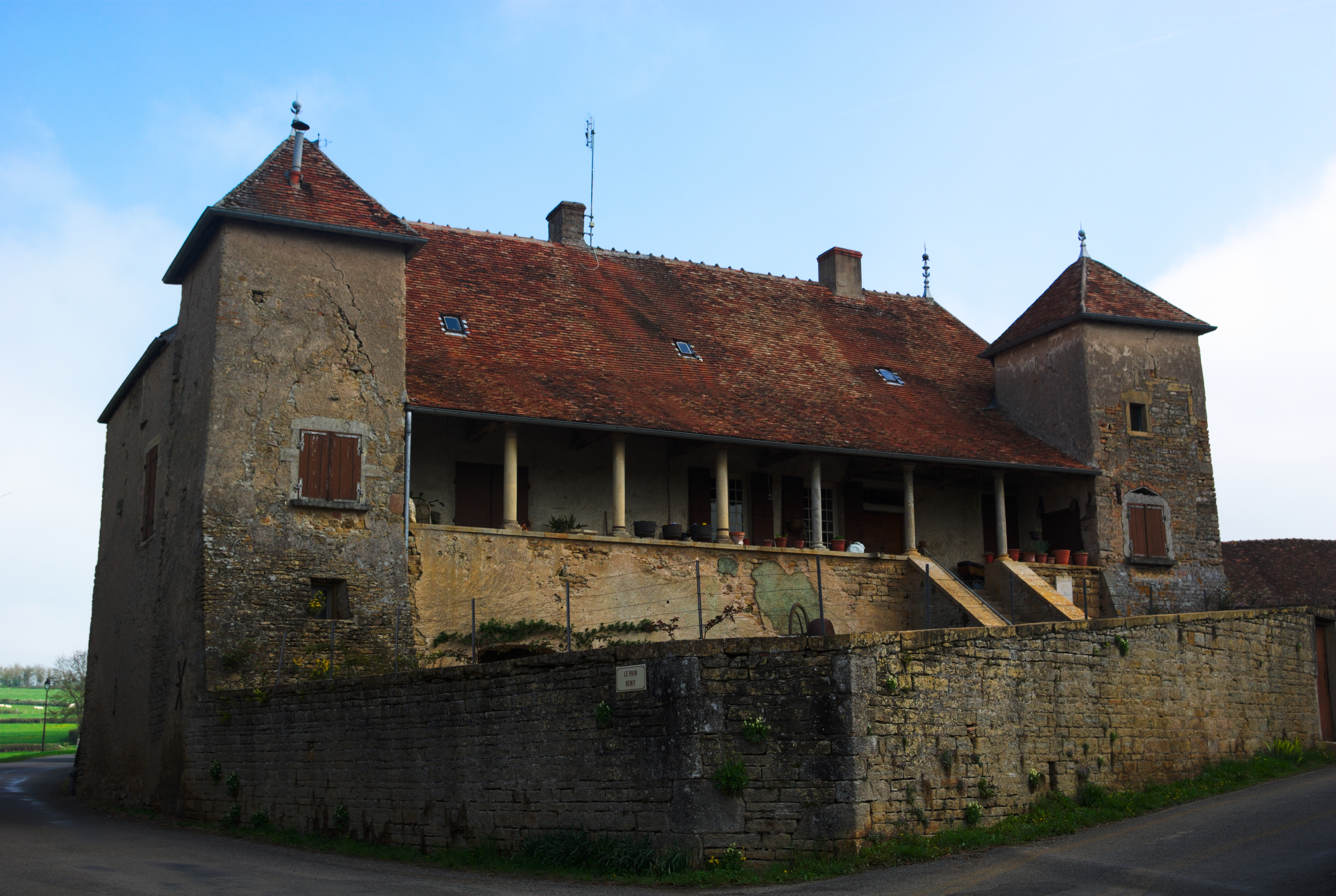
- Maison Monnier

- Coat of arms
- Location of Sigy-le-Châtel
- Location within France Location within Bourgogne-Franche-Comté
- Coordinates: 46°33′20″N 4°34′31″E
- Country: France
- Region: Bourgogne-Franche-Comté
- Department: Saône-et-Loire
- Arrondissement: Mâcon
- Canton: Cluny

Government
  - Mayor (2020–2026): Alain Douard
- Area^{1}: 6.95 km^{2} (2.68 sq mi)
- Elevation: 240 m (790 ft)
- Highest elevation: 388 m (1,273 ft)
- Lowest elevation: 217 m (712 ft)
- Population (2023): 104
  - Density: 15.0/km^{2} (38.8/sq mi)
- Time zone: UTC+01:00 (CET)
  - Summer (DST): UTC+02:00 (CEST)
- INSEE/Postal code: 71521 /71250
- ^{1} French Land Register data, which excludes lakes, ponds, glaciers > 1 km^{2} (0.386 sq mi or 247 acres) and river estuaries.

Sigy-le-Châtel (French pronunciation: [siʒi lə ʃatɛl]) is a commune in the Saône-et-Loire département in the region of Bourgogne-Franche-Comté in eastern France.

== Sights ==
- Château de Sigy-le-Châtel, ruins of a feudal castle.

== See also ==
- Communes of the Saône-et-Loire department
