= Mons-en-Montois =

- Commune
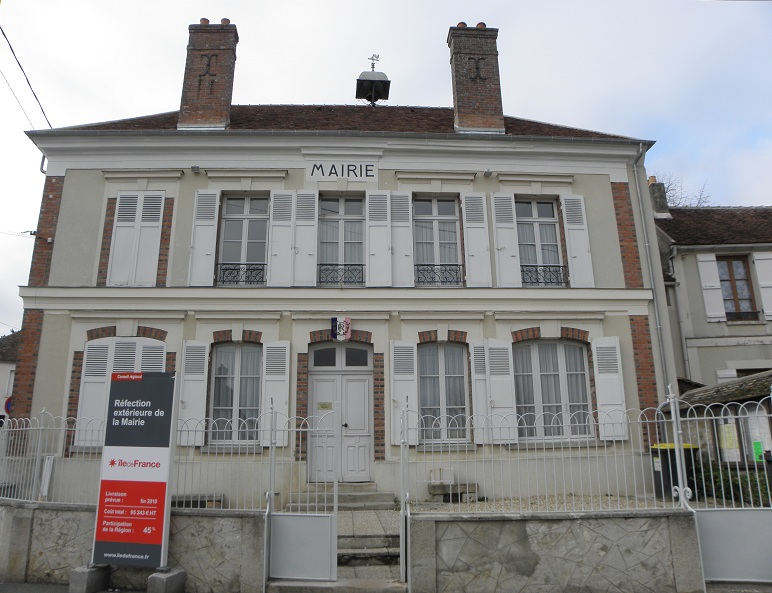
- The town hall in Mons-en-Montois
- Location of Mons-en-Montois
- Location within France Location within Île-de-France (region)
- Coordinates: 48°29′20″N 3°08′50″E
- Country: France
- Region: Île-de-France
- Department: Seine-et-Marne
- Arrondissement: Provins
- Canton: Provins
- Intercommunality: CC Bassée - Montois

Government
  - Mayor (2020–2026): Bruno Demaegdt
- Area^{1}: 6.23 km^{2} (2.41 sq mi)
- Highest elevation: 146 m (479 ft)
- Lowest elevation: 66 m (217 ft)
- Population (2023): 454
  - Density: 72.9/km^{2} (189/sq mi)
- Time zone: UTC+01:00 (CET)
  - Summer (DST): UTC+02:00 (CEST)
- INSEE/Postal code: 77298 /77520
- ^{1} French Land Register data, which excludes lakes, ponds, glaciers > 1 km^{2} (0.386 sq mi or 247 acres) and river estuaries.

Mons-en-Montois (French pronunciation: [mɔ̃s ɑ̃ mɔ̃twa]) is a commune in the Seine-et-Marne department in the Île-de-France region in north-central France.

== Demographics ==
The inhabitants are called the Montoyens.

== See also ==
- Communes of the Seine-et-Marne department
