= Gurcy-le-Châtel =

- Commune
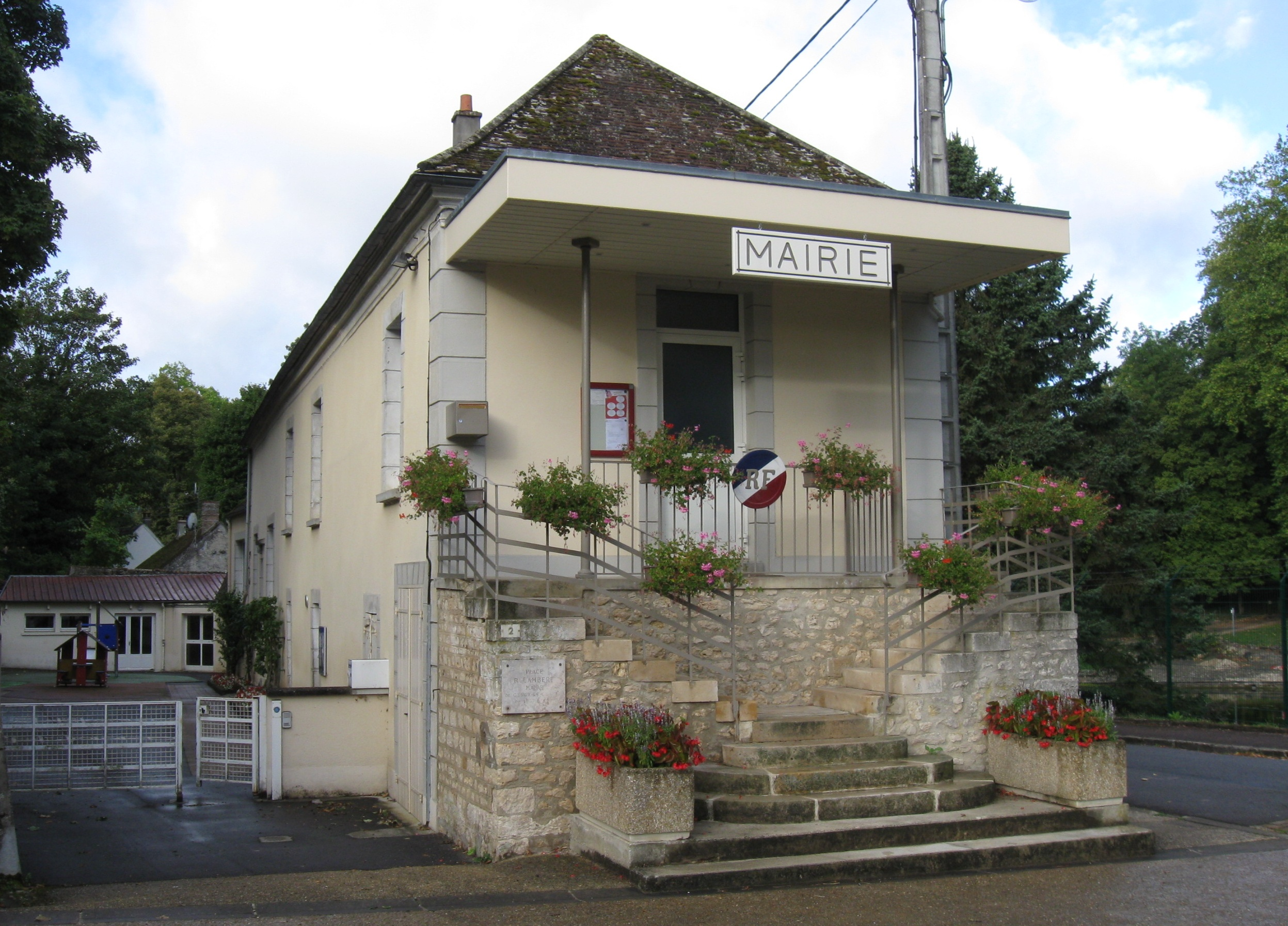
- The town hall in Gurcy-le-Châtel
- Location of Gurcy-le-Châtel
- Location within France Location within Île-de-France (region)
- Coordinates: 48°28′13″N 3°05′31″E
- Country: France
- Region: Île-de-France
- Department: Seine-et-Marne
- Arrondissement: Provins
- Canton: Provins
- Intercommunality: CC Bassée - Montois

Government
  - Mayor (2020–2026): Nadine Villiers
- Area^{1}: 12.59 km^{2} (4.86 sq mi)
- Highest elevation: 149 m (489 ft)
- Lowest elevation: 94 m (308 ft)
- Population (2023): 559
  - Density: 44.4/km^{2} (115/sq mi)
- Time zone: UTC+01:00 (CET)
  - Summer (DST): UTC+02:00 (CEST)
- INSEE/Postal code: 77223 /77520
- ^{1} French Land Register data, which excludes lakes, ponds, glaciers > 1 km^{2} (0.386 sq mi or 247 acres) and river estuaries.

Gurcy-le-Châtel (French pronunciation: [ɡyʁsi lə ʃatɛl]) is a commune in the Seine-et-Marne department in the Île-de-France region in north-central France. It is situated some 75 km south-east of Paris.

== Demographics ==
Inhabitants are called Gurcyssois.

== See also ==
- Communes of the Seine-et-Marne department
