= Sognolles-en-Montois =

- Commune
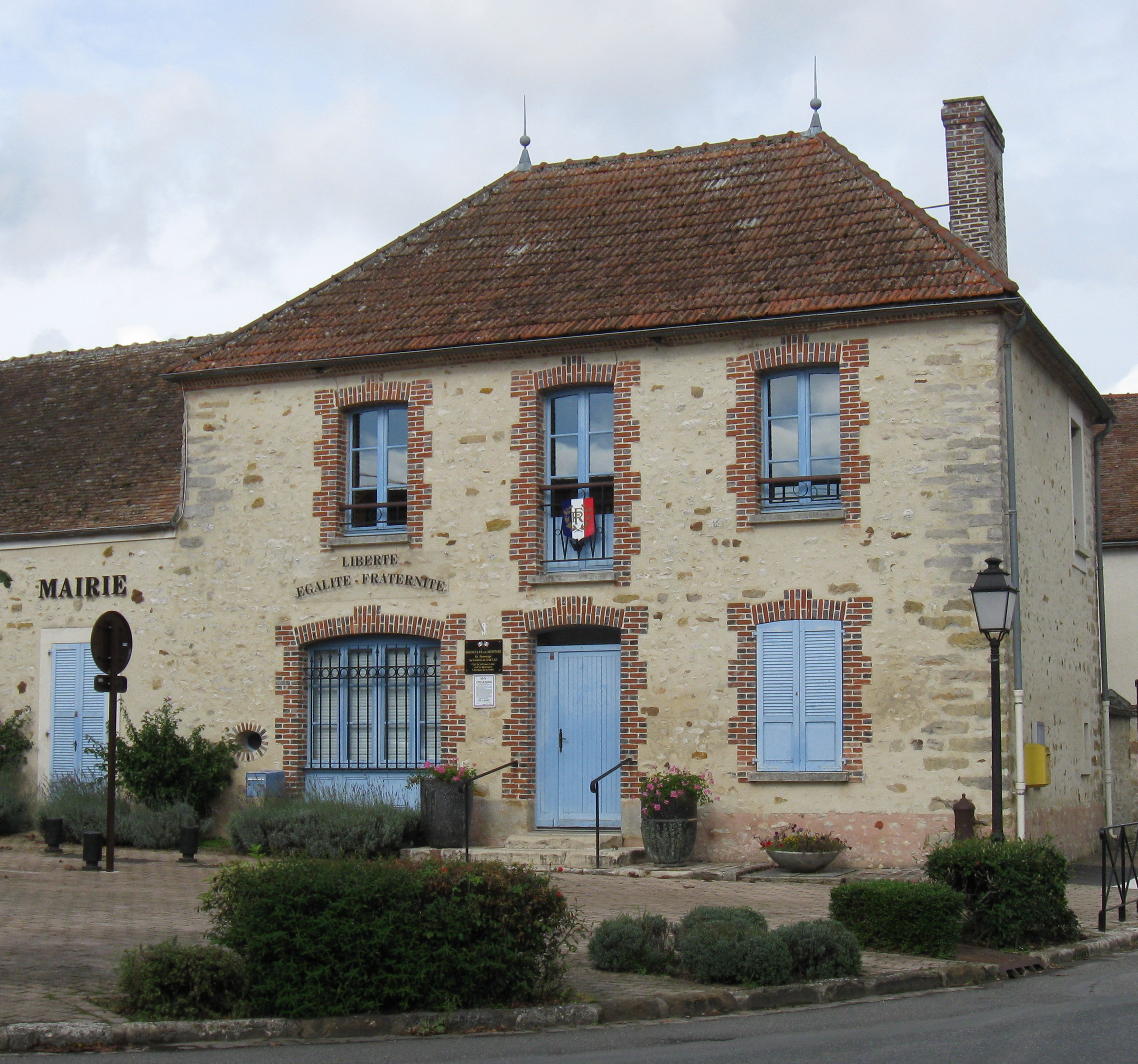
- The town hall in Sognolles-en-Montois
- Location of Sognolles-en-Montois
- Location within France Location within Île-de-France (region)
- Coordinates: 48°30′37″N 3°10′07″E
- Country: France
- Region: Île-de-France
- Department: Seine-et-Marne
- Arrondissement: Provins
- Canton: Provins
- Intercommunality: CC Bassée - Montois

Government
  - Mayor (2020–2026): Gisèle Richard
- Area^{1}: 10.12 km^{2} (3.91 sq mi)
- Highest elevation: 161 m (528 ft)
- Lowest elevation: 76 m (249 ft)
- Population (2023): 371
  - Density: 36.7/km^{2} (94.9/sq mi)
- Time zone: UTC+01:00 (CET)
  - Summer (DST): UTC+02:00 (CEST)
- INSEE/Postal code: 77454 /77520
- ^{1} French Land Register data, which excludes lakes, ponds, glaciers > 1 km^{2} (0.386 sq mi or 247 acres) and river estuaries.

Sognolles-en-Montois (French pronunciation: [sɔɲɔl ɑ̃ mɔ̃twa]) is a commune in the Seine-et-Marne department in the Île-de-France region in north-central France.

== Demographics ==
Inhabitants of Sognolles-en-Montois are called Sognolots.

== See also ==
- Communes of the Seine-et-Marne department
