= Coutençon =

- Commune
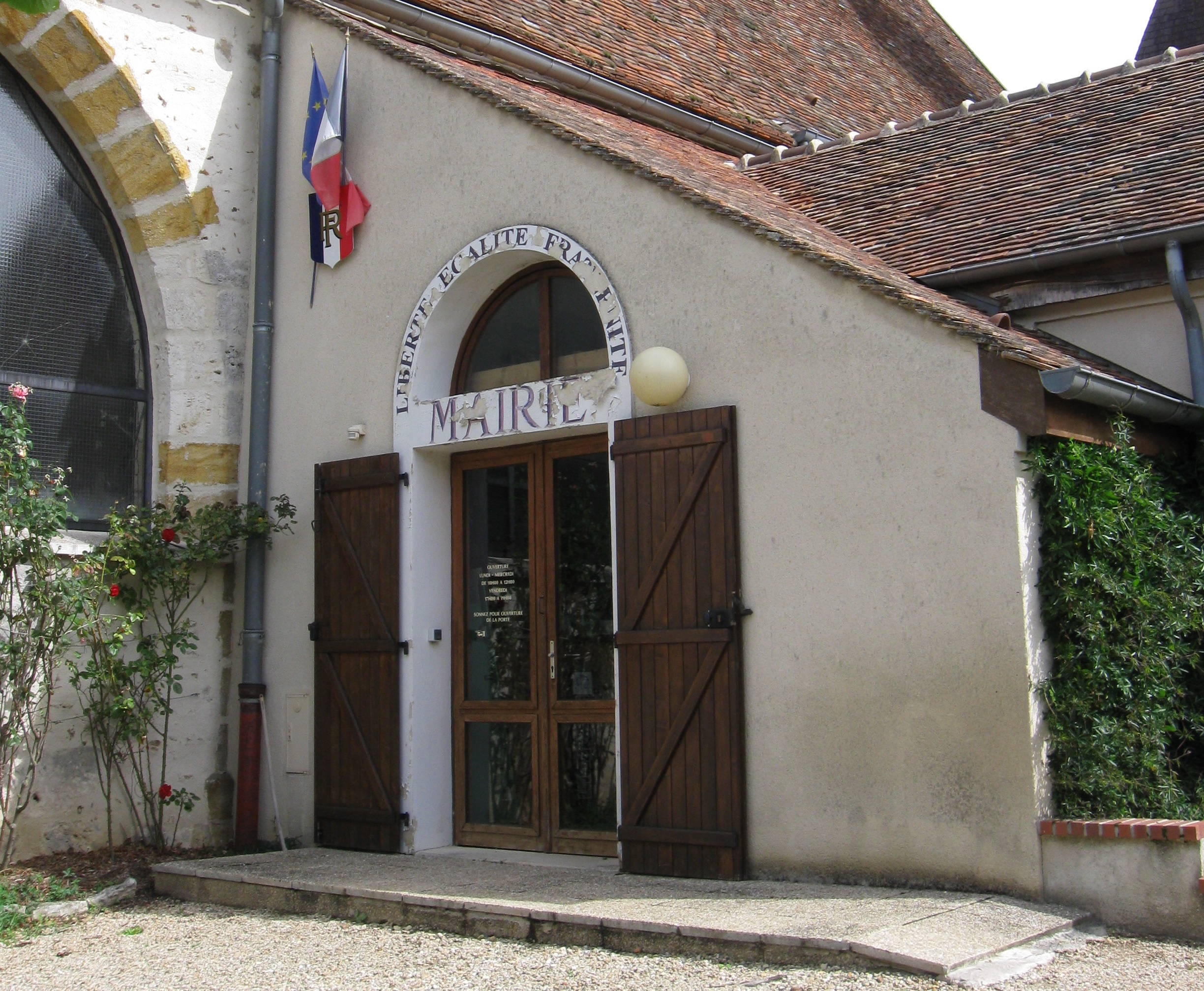
- The town hall in Coutençon
- Location of Coutençon
- Location within France Location within Île-de-France (region)
- Coordinates: 48°28′15″N 2°59′47″E
- Country: France
- Region: Île-de-France
- Department: Seine-et-Marne
- Arrondissement: Provins
- Canton: Provins
- Intercommunality: CC Bassée - Montois

Government
  - Mayor (2020–2026): Emric Hermans
- Area^{1}: 6.23 km^{2} (2.41 sq mi)
- Highest elevation: 138 m (453 ft)
- Lowest elevation: 111 m (364 ft)
- Population (2023): 260
  - Density: 42/km^{2} (110/sq mi)
- Time zone: UTC+01:00 (CET)
  - Summer (DST): UTC+02:00 (CEST)
- INSEE/Postal code: 77140 /77154
- ^{1} French Land Register data, which excludes lakes, ponds, glaciers > 1 km^{2} (0.386 sq mi or 247 acres) and river estuaries.

Coutençon (French pronunciation: [kutɑ̃sɔ̃]) is a commune in the Seine-et-Marne department in the Île-de-France region in north-central France.

== Demographics ==
The inhabitants are called Contençonnais.

== See also ==
- Communes of the Seine-et-Marne department
