= Montigny-Lencoup =

- Commune
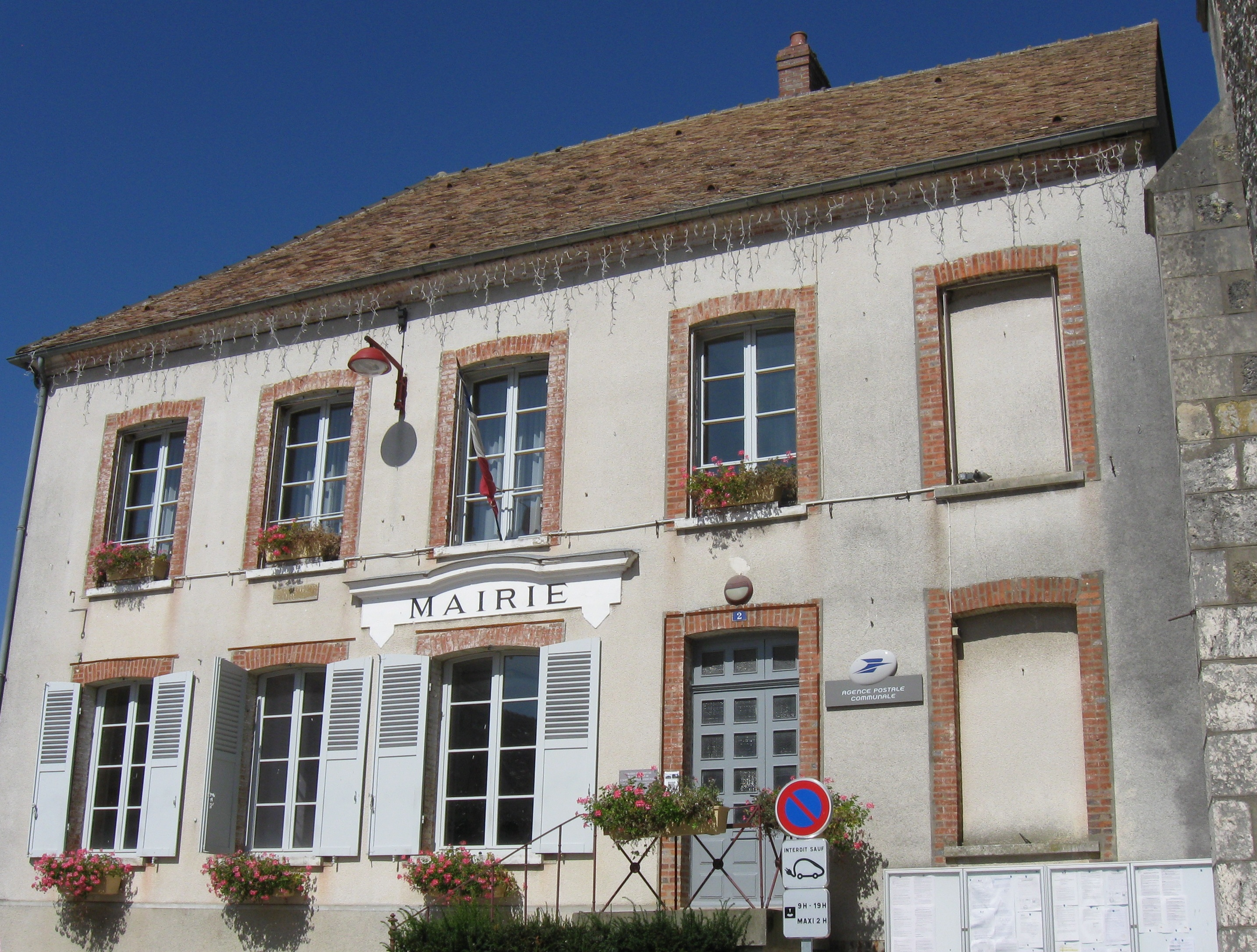
- The town hall in Montigny-Lencoup
- Location of Montigny-Lencoup
- Location within France Location within Île-de-France (region)
- Coordinates: 48°27′10″N 3°03′51″E
- Country: France
- Region: Île-de-France
- Department: Seine-et-Marne
- Arrondissement: Provins
- Canton: Provins
- Intercommunality: CC Bassée - Montois

Government
  - Mayor (2020–2026): Roger Denormandie
- Area^{1}: 20.37 km^{2} (7.86 sq mi)
- Highest elevation: 149 m (489 ft)
- Lowest elevation: 67 m (220 ft)
- Population (2023): 1,358
  - Density: 66.67/km^{2} (172.7/sq mi)
- Time zone: UTC+01:00 (CET)
  - Summer (DST): UTC+02:00 (CEST)
- INSEE/Postal code: 77311 /77520
- ^{1} French Land Register data, which excludes lakes, ponds, glaciers > 1 km^{2} (0.386 sq mi or 247 acres) and river estuaries.

Montigny-Lencoup (French pronunciation: [mɔ̃tiɲi lɑ̃ku]) is a commune in the Seine-et-Marne department in the Île-de-France region in north-central France.

== See also ==
- Communes of the Seine-et-Marne department
