= Villeneuve-les-Bordes =

- Commune
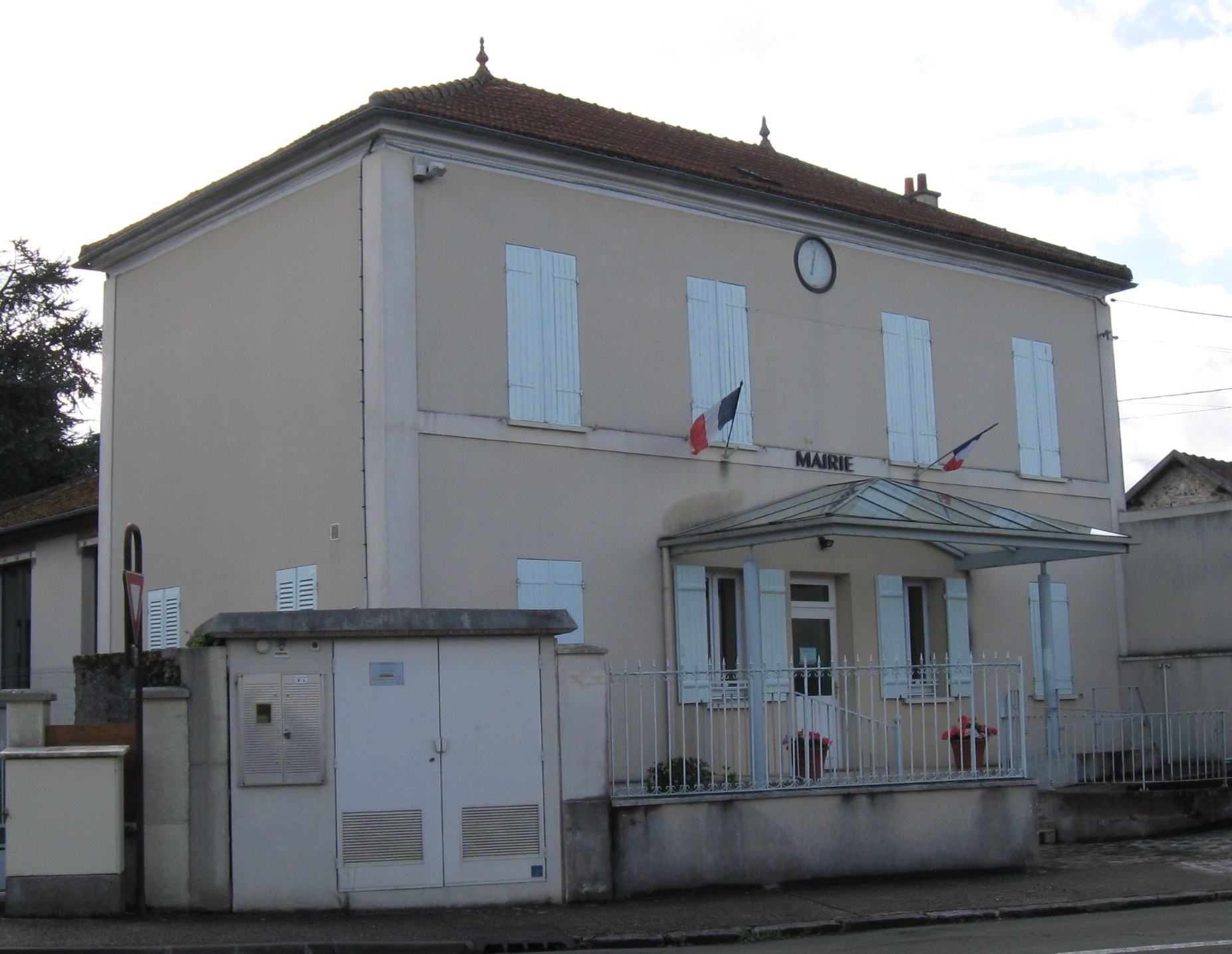
- The town hall in Villeneuve-les-Bordes
- Location of Villeneuve-les-Bordes
- Location within France Location within Île-de-France (region)
- Coordinates: 48°29′11″N 3°02′36″E
- Country: France
- Region: Île-de-France
- Department: Seine-et-Marne
- Arrondissement: Provins
- Canton: Provins
- Intercommunality: CC Bassée - Montois

Government
  - Mayor (2020–2026): Sabine Charles-Roos
- Area^{1}: 20.60 km^{2} (7.95 sq mi)
- Highest elevation: 149 m (489 ft)
- Lowest elevation: 117 m (384 ft)
- Population (2023): 610
  - Density: 30/km^{2} (77/sq mi)
- Time zone: UTC+01:00 (CET)
  - Summer (DST): UTC+02:00 (CEST)
- INSEE/Postal code: 77509 /77154
- ^{1} French Land Register data, which excludes lakes, ponds, glaciers > 1 km^{2} (0.386 sq mi or 247 acres) and river estuaries.

Villeneuve-les-Bordes (French pronunciation: [vilnœv le bɔʁd]) is a commune in the Seine-et-Marne department, in the Île-de-France region in north-central France.

== Demographics ==
Inhabitants of Villeneuve-les-Bordes are called Villeneuvois.

== See also ==
- Communes of the Seine-et-Marne department
