= Égligny =

- Commune
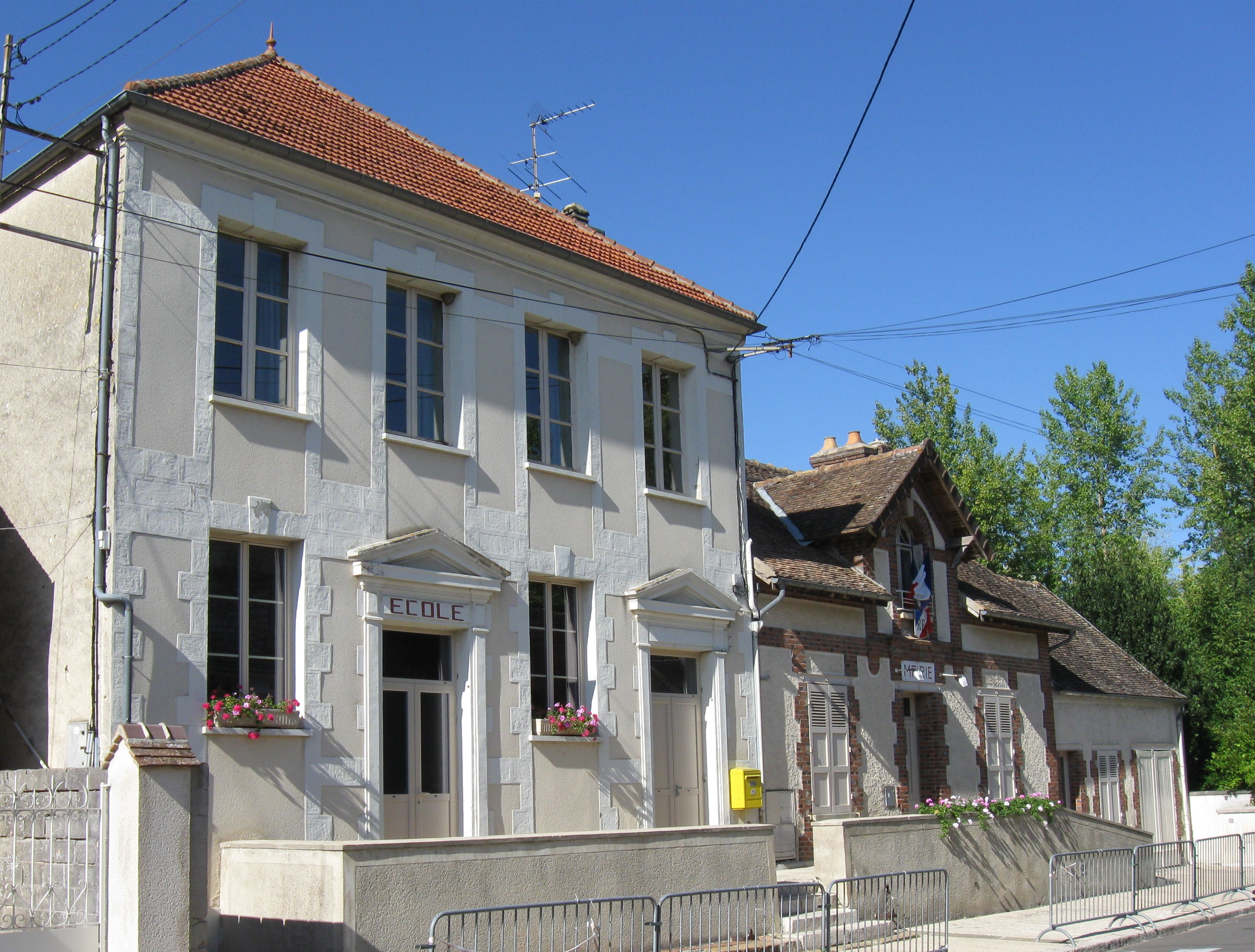
- The school and town hall in Égligny
- Location of Égligny
- Location within France Location within Île-de-France (region)
- Coordinates: 48°25′37″N 3°07′15″E
- Country: France
- Region: Île-de-France
- Department: Seine-et-Marne
- Arrondissement: Provins
- Canton: Provins
- Intercommunality: CC Bassée - Montois

Government
  - Mayor (2020–2026): Christine Lemore
- Area^{1}: 16.58 km^{2} (6.40 sq mi)
- Highest elevation: 135 m (443 ft)
- Lowest elevation: 50 m (160 ft)
- Population (2023): 310
  - Density: 19/km^{2} (48/sq mi)
- Time zone: UTC+01:00 (CET)
  - Summer (DST): UTC+02:00 (CEST)
- INSEE/Postal code: 77167 /77126
- ^{1} French Land Register data, which excludes lakes, ponds, glaciers > 1 km^{2} (0.386 sq mi or 247 acres) and river estuaries.

Égligny (French: [egliɲi]) is a commune in the Seine-et-Marne department in the Île-de-France region in north-central France.

== Demographics ==
Inhabitants of Égligny are called Églignyciens.

== See also ==
- Communes of the Seine-et-Marne department
