= Vimpelles =

- Commune
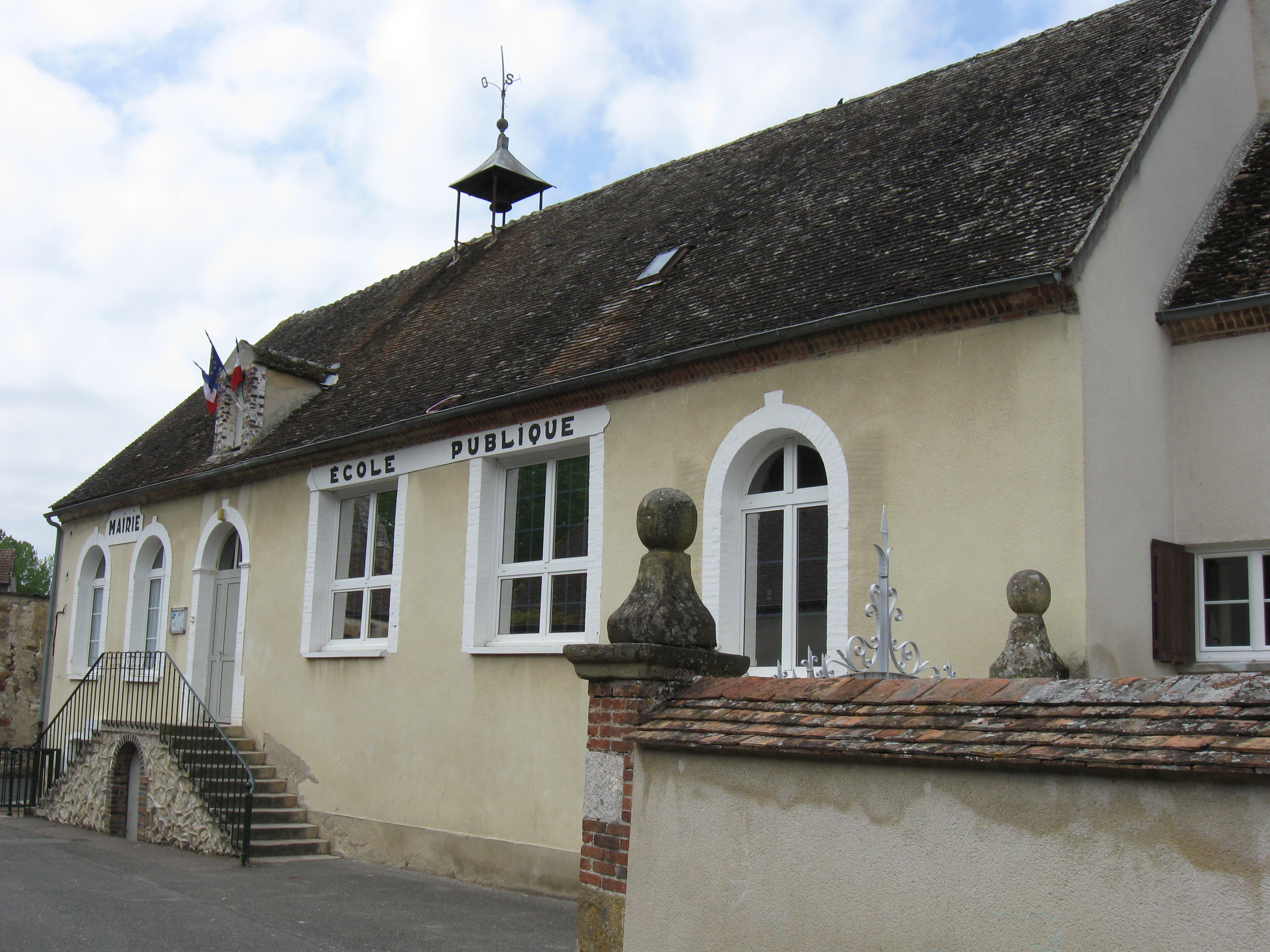
- The town hall in Vimpelles
- Location of Vimpelles
- Location within France Location within Île-de-France (region)
- Coordinates: 48°26′23″N 3°09′57″E
- Country: France
- Region: Île-de-France
- Department: Seine-et-Marne
- Arrondissement: Provins
- Canton: Provins
- Intercommunality: CC Bassée - Montois

Government
  - Mayor (2020–2026): Nadine Delattre
- Area^{1}: 11.33 km^{2} (4.37 sq mi)
- Highest elevation: 132 m (433 ft)
- Lowest elevation: 51 m (167 ft)
- Population (2023): 512
  - Density: 45.2/km^{2} (117/sq mi)
- Time zone: UTC+01:00 (CET)
  - Summer (DST): UTC+02:00 (CEST)
- INSEE/Postal code: 77524 /77520
- ^{1} French Land Register data, which excludes lakes, ponds, glaciers > 1 km^{2} (0.386 sq mi or 247 acres) and river estuaries.

Vimpelles (French: [vɛ̃pɛl]) is a commune in the Seine-et-Marne department in the Île-de-France region in north-central France.

The 19th-century French hellenist, byzantinist, historian, papyrologist, translator and academician Wladimir Brunet de Presle (1809–1875) died in Vimpelles (then Parouzeau).

== Demographics ==
Inhabitants of Vimpelles are called Vimpellois.

== See also ==
- Communes of the Seine-et-Marne department
