= Luisetaines =

- Commune
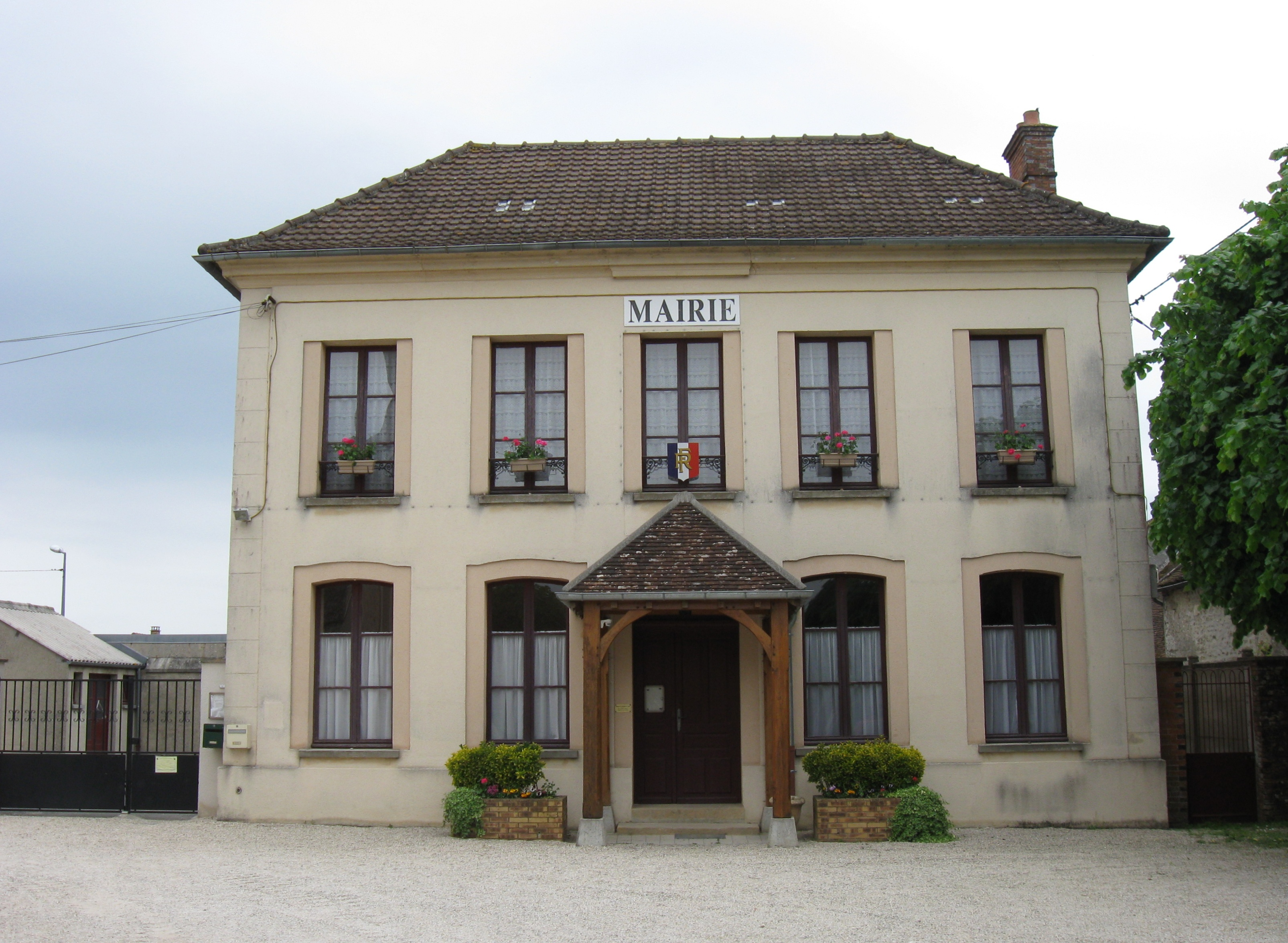
- The town hall in Luisetaines
- Location of Luisetaines
- Location within France Location within Île-de-France (region)
- Coordinates: 48°28′02″N 3°10′52″E
- Country: France
- Region: Île-de-France
- Department: Seine-et-Marne
- Arrondissement: Provins
- Canton: Provins
- Intercommunality: CC Bassée - Montois

Government
  - Mayor (2020–2026): Michel Forget
- Area^{1}: 5.04 km^{2} (1.95 sq mi)
- Highest elevation: 125 m (410 ft)
- Lowest elevation: 54 m (177 ft)
- Population (2023): 229
  - Density: 45.4/km^{2} (118/sq mi)
- Time zone: UTC+01:00 (CET)
  - Summer (DST): UTC+02:00 (CEST)
- INSEE/Postal code: 77263 /77520
- ^{1} French Land Register data, which excludes lakes, ponds, glaciers > 1 km^{2} (0.386 sq mi or 247 acres) and river estuaries.

Luisetaines (French pronunciation: [lɥiztɛn]) is a French commune located in the Seine-et-Marne département, in the Île-de-France région. As of 2023, the population of the commune was 229.

== See also ==
- Communes of the Seine-et-Marne department
