= Paroy, Seine-et-Marne =

Paroy
- Commune
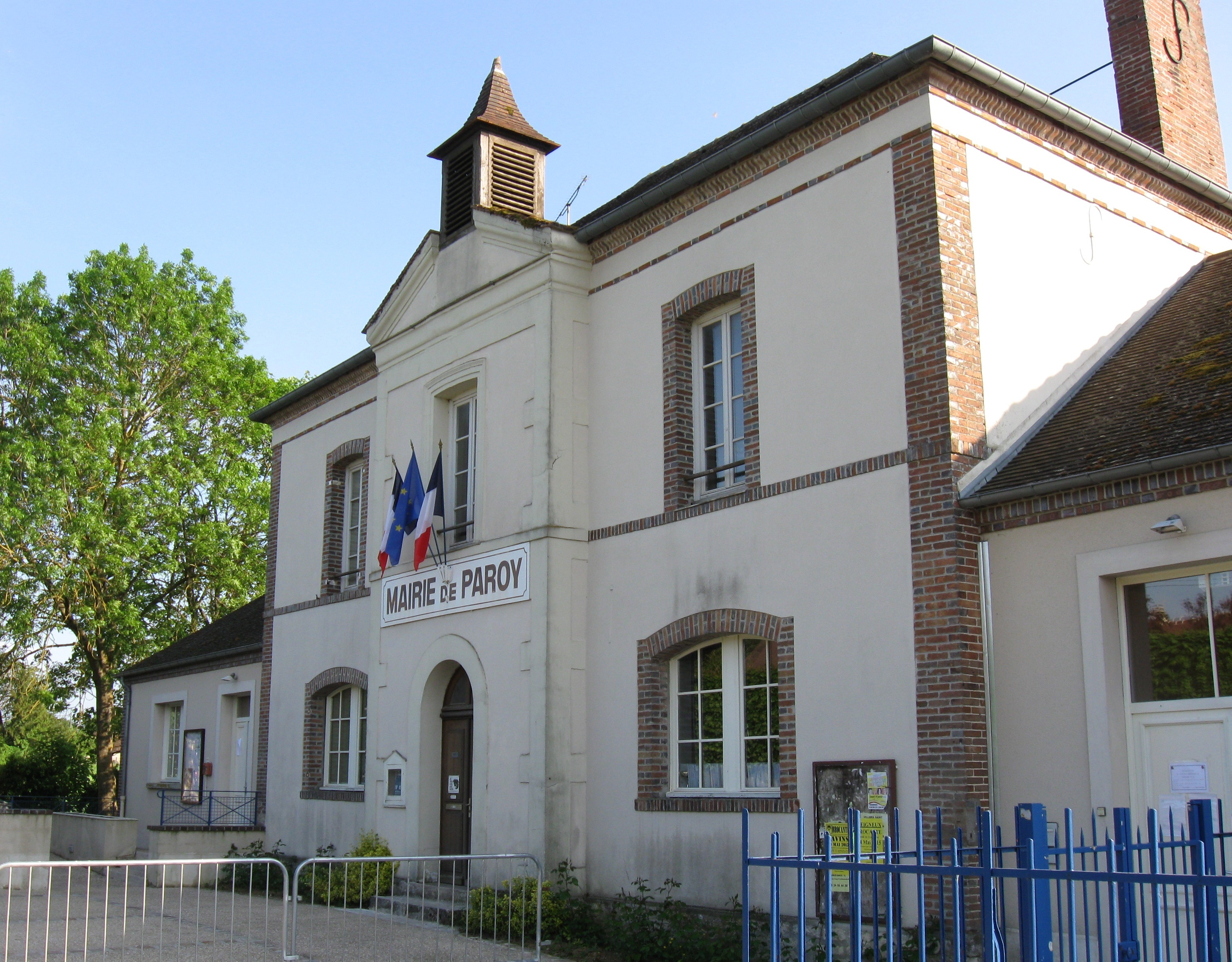
- The town hall in Paroy
- Location of Paroy
- Location within France Location within Île-de-France (region)
- Coordinates: 48°28′46″N 3°12′03″E
- Country: France
- Region: Île-de-France
- Department: Seine-et-Marne
- Arrondissement: Provins
- Canton: Provins
- Intercommunality: CC Bassée - Montois

Government
  - Mayor (2020–2026): Jean-Claude Gautry
- Area^{1}: 4.25 km^{2} (1.64 sq mi)
- Highest elevation: 152 m (499 ft)
- Lowest elevation: 57 m (187 ft)
- Population (2023): 187
  - Density: 44.0/km^{2} (114/sq mi)
- Time zone: UTC+01:00 (CET)
  - Summer (DST): UTC+02:00 (CEST)
- INSEE/Postal code: 77355 /77520
- ^{1} French Land Register data, which excludes lakes, ponds, glaciers > 1 km^{2} (0.386 sq mi or 247 acres) and river estuaries.

Paroy (French pronunciation: [paʁwa]) is a commune in the Seine-et-Marne department in the Île-de-France region in north-central France.

== Demographics ==
Inhabitants are called Paroyens.

== See also ==
- Communes of the Seine-et-Marne department
