= Thénisy =

- Commune
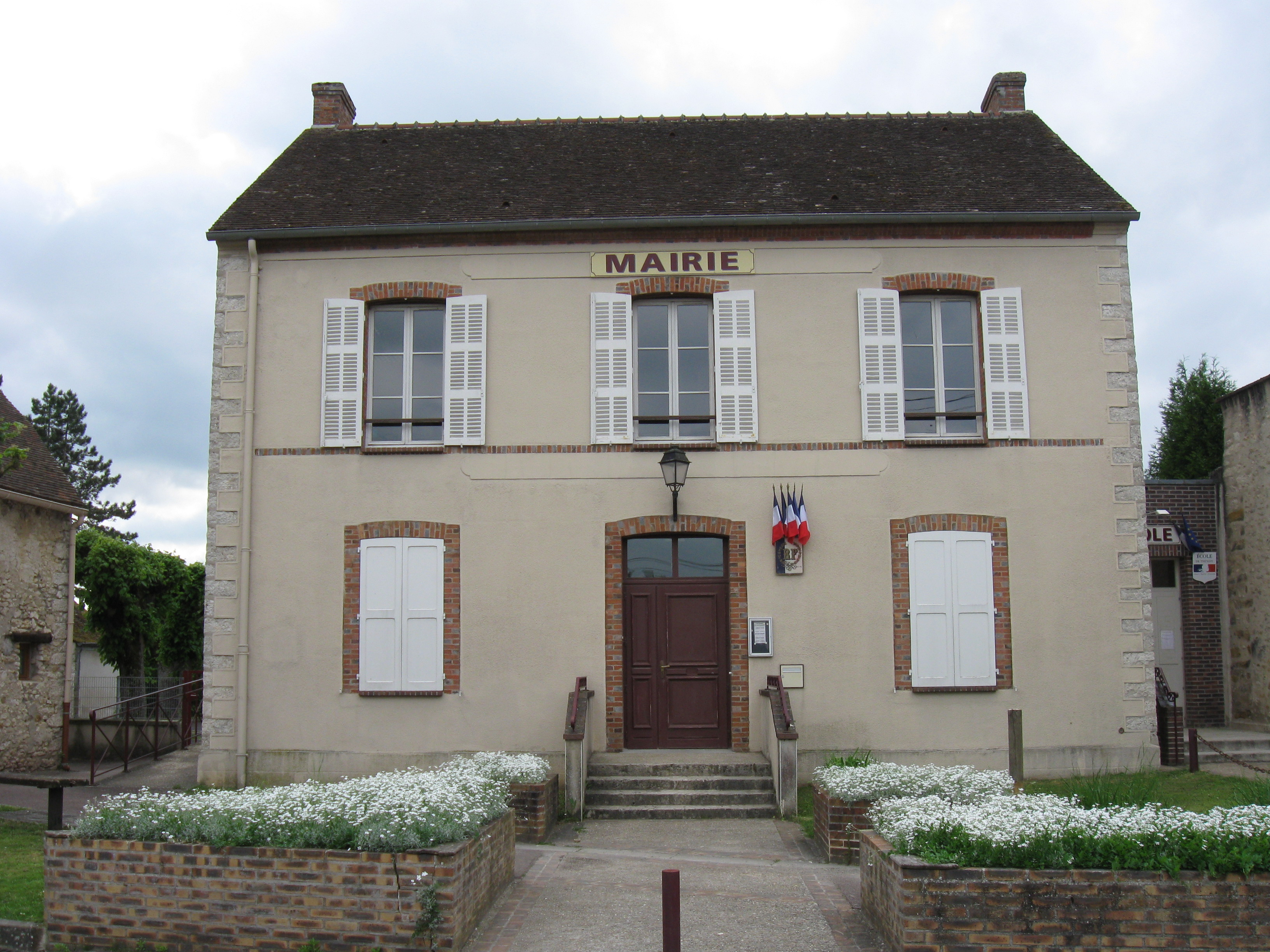
- The town hall in Thénisy
- Location of Thénisy
- Location within France Location within Île-de-France (region)
- Coordinates: 48°29′20″N 3°10′41″E
- Country: France
- Region: Île-de-France
- Department: Seine-et-Marne
- Arrondissement: Provins
- Canton: Provins
- Intercommunality: CC Bassée - Montois

Government
  - Mayor (2020–2026): Régis De Rycke
- Area^{1}: 5.37 km^{2} (2.07 sq mi)
- Highest elevation: 138 m (453 ft)
- Lowest elevation: 62 m (203 ft)
- Population (2023): 297
  - Density: 55.3/km^{2} (143/sq mi)
- Time zone: UTC+01:00 (CET)
  - Summer (DST): UTC+02:00 (CEST)
- INSEE/Postal code: 77461 /77520
- ^{1} French Land Register data, which excludes lakes, ponds, glaciers > 1 km^{2} (0.386 sq mi or 247 acres) and river estuaries.

Thénisy (French pronunciation: [tenizi]) is a commune in the Seine-et-Marne department in the Île-de-France region in north-central France.

== See also ==
- Communes of the Seine-et-Marne department
