= Jutigny =

- Commune
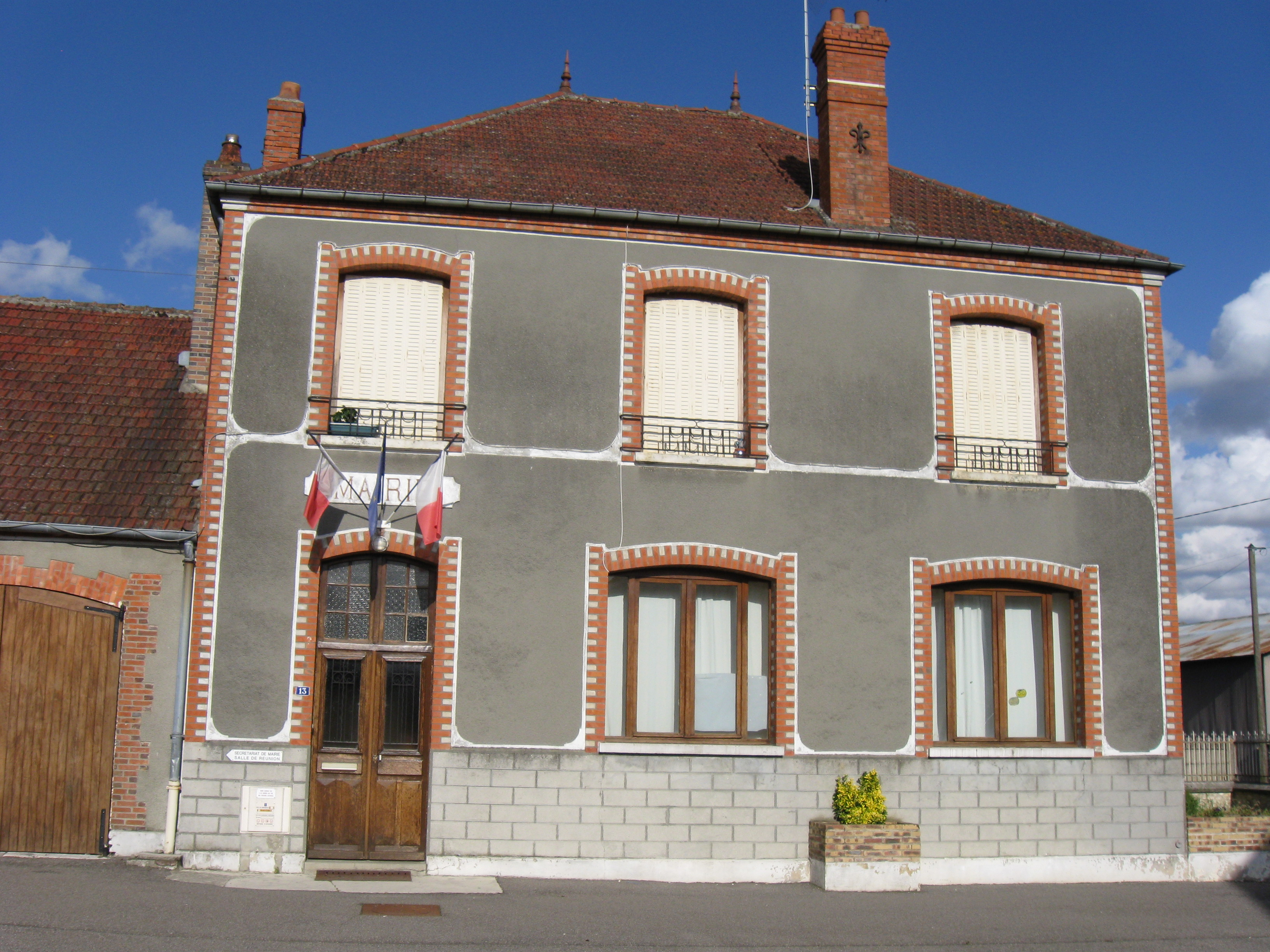
- The town hall in Jutigny
- Location of Jutigny
- Location within France Location within Île-de-France (region)
- Coordinates: 48°29′55″N 3°14′00″E
- Country: France
- Region: Île-de-France
- Department: Seine-et-Marne
- Arrondissement: Provins
- Canton: Provins
- Intercommunality: CC Bassée - Montois

Government
  - Mayor (2020–2026): Fabrice Genon
- Area^{1}: 4.60 km^{2} (1.78 sq mi)
- Highest elevation: 136 m (446 ft)
- Lowest elevation: 61 m (200 ft)
- Population (2023): 547
  - Density: 119/km^{2} (308/sq mi)
- Time zone: UTC+01:00 (CET)
  - Summer (DST): UTC+02:00 (CEST)
- INSEE/Postal code: 77242 /77650
- ^{1} French Land Register data, which excludes lakes, ponds, glaciers > 1 km^{2} (0.386 sq mi or 247 acres) and river estuaries.

Jutigny (French pronunciation: [ʒytiɲi]) is a commune in the Seine-et-Marne department in the Île-de-France region in north-central France.

== Demographics ==
Inhabitants are called Justigniaciens.

== See also ==
- Communes of the Seine-et-Marne department
