= Meigneux, Seine-et-Marne =

Meigneux
- Commune
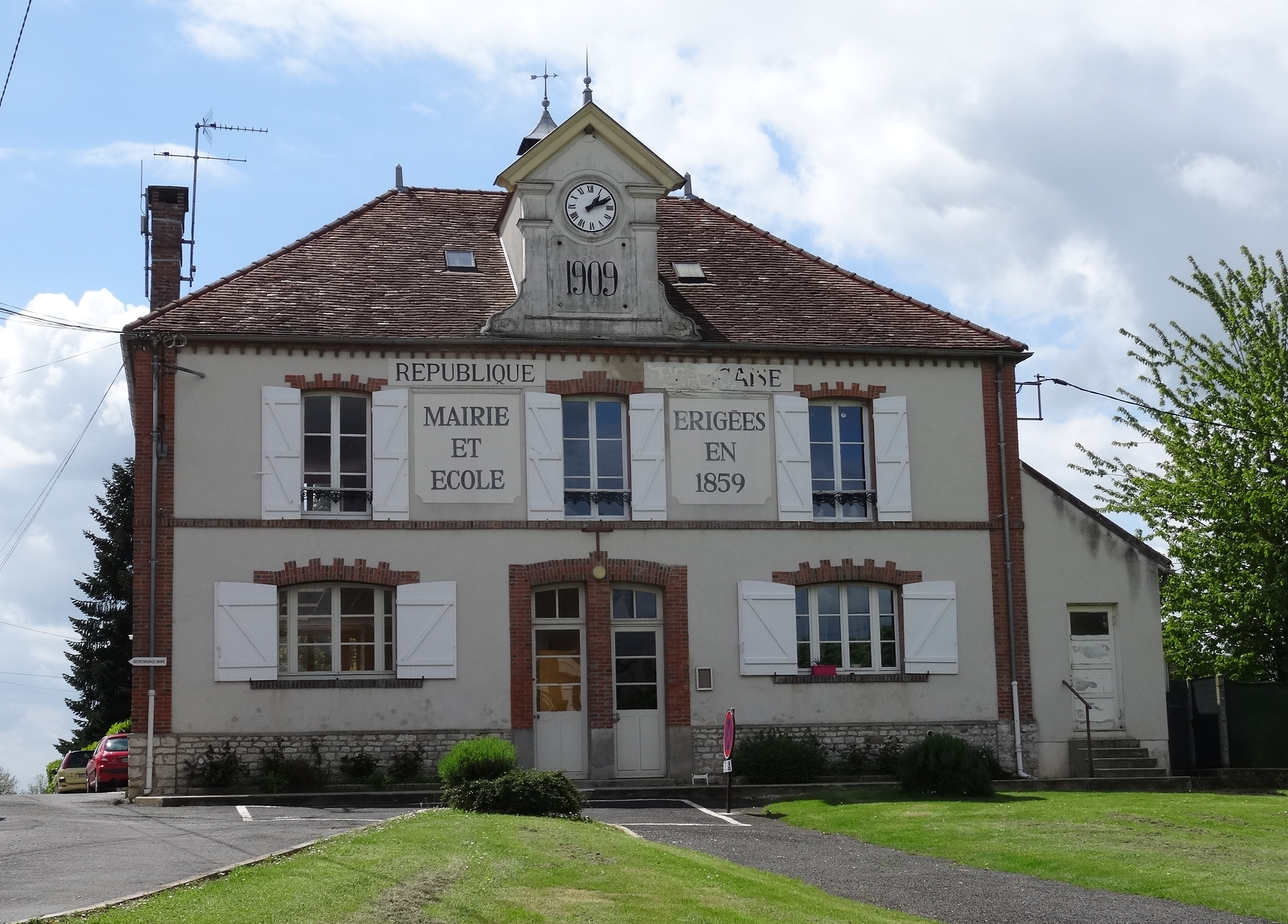
- The town hall in Meigneux
- Location of Meigneux
- Location within France Location within Île-de-France (region)
- Coordinates: 48°30′42″N 3°06′20″E
- Country: France
- Region: Île-de-France
- Department: Seine-et-Marne
- Arrondissement: Provins
- Canton: Provins
- Intercommunality: CC Bassée - Montois

Government
  - Mayor (2020–2026): Véronique Samson
- Area^{1}: 7.76 km^{2} (3.00 sq mi)
- Highest elevation: 146 m (479 ft)
- Lowest elevation: 108 m (354 ft)
- Population (2023): 236
  - Density: 30.4/km^{2} (78.8/sq mi)
- Time zone: UTC+01:00 (CET)
  - Summer (DST): UTC+02:00 (CEST)
- INSEE/Postal code: 77286 /77520
- ^{1} French Land Register data, which excludes lakes, ponds, glaciers > 1 km^{2} (0.386 sq mi or 247 acres) and river estuaries.

Meigneux (French pronunciation: [mɛɲø]) is a commune in the Seine-et-Marne department in the Île-de-France region in north-central France.

== Demographics ==
Inhabitants are called Meigneusiens.

== See also ==
- Communes of the Seine-et-Marne department
