= Châtenay-sur-Seine =

- Commune
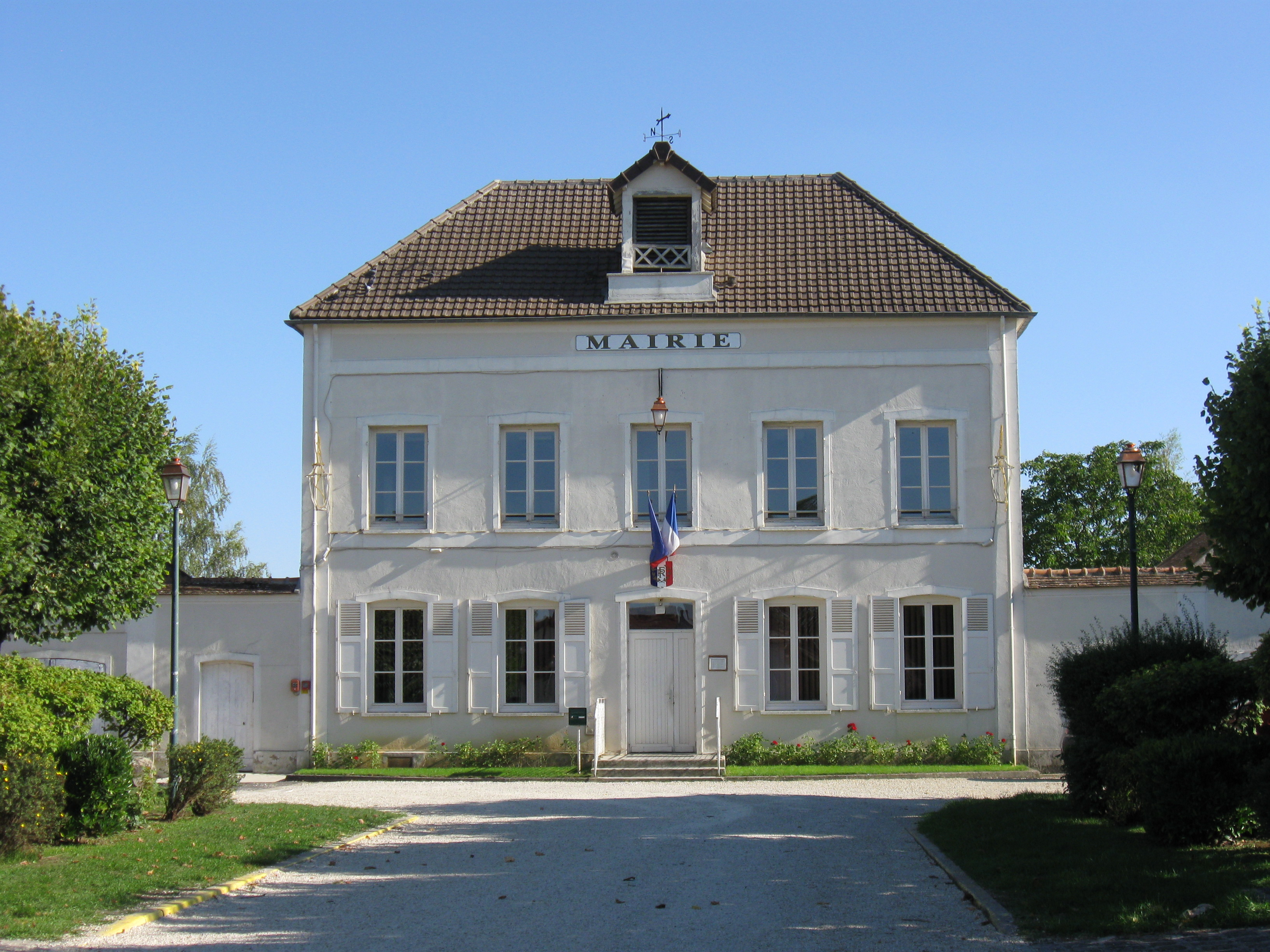
- The town hall in Châtenay-sur-Seine
- Location of Châtenay-sur-Seine
- Location within France Location within Île-de-France (region)
- Coordinates: 48°25′15″N 3°06′00″E
- Country: France
- Region: Île-de-France
- Department: Seine-et-Marne
- Arrondissement: Provins
- Canton: Provins
- Intercommunality: CC de la Bassée - Montois

Government
  - Mayor (2020–2026): Stéphanie Banos
- Area^{1}: 13.01 km^{2} (5.02 sq mi)
- Highest elevation: 118 m (387 ft)
- Lowest elevation: 49 m (161 ft)
- Population (2023): 1,049
  - Density: 80.63/km^{2} (208.8/sq mi)
- Demonym: Châtenaisiens
- Time zone: UTC+01:00 (CET)
  - Summer (DST): UTC+02:00 (CEST)
- INSEE/Postal code: 77101 /77126
- Website: chatenay-sur-seine.com
- ^{1} French Land Register data, which excludes lakes, ponds, glaciers > 1 km^{2} (0.386 sq mi or 247 acres) and river estuaries.

Châtenay-sur-Seine (French pronunciation: [ʃatnɛ syʁ sɛn]; lit. 'Châtenay-on-Seine') is a rural commune in the Seine-et-Marne department in the Île-de-France region in north-central France.

== Demographics ==
The inhabitants are called Châtenaysiens.

== See also ==
- Communes of the Seine-et-Marne department
