= Savins =

- Commune
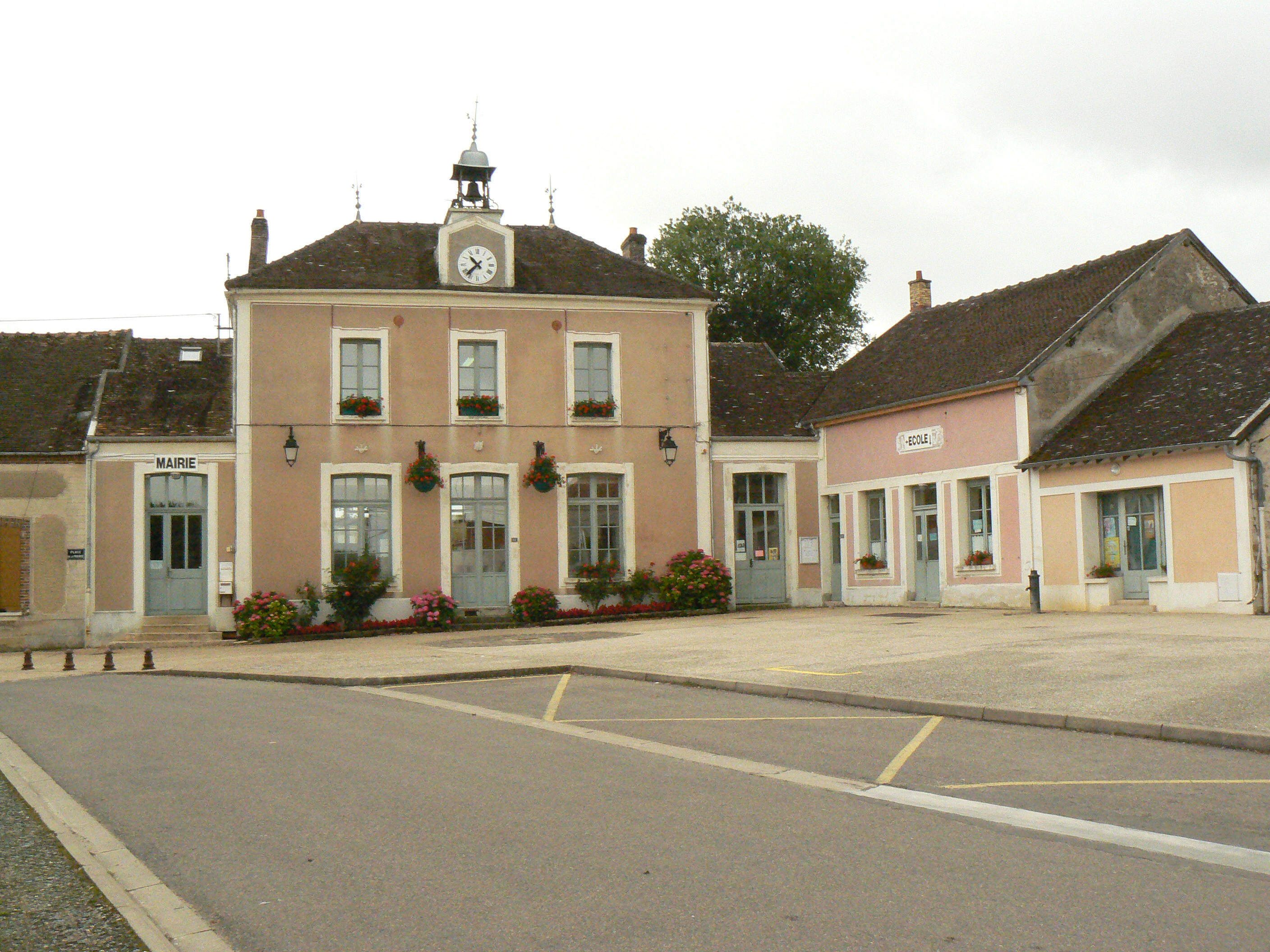
- The town hall in Savins
- Location of Savins
- Location within France Location within Île-de-France (region)
- Coordinates: 48°30′40″N 3°12′03″E
- Country: France
- Region: Île-de-France
- Department: Seine-et-Marne
- Arrondissement: Provins
- Canton: Provins
- Intercommunality: CC Bassée - Montois

Government
  - Mayor (2020–2026): Jean-Louis Chaigneau
- Area^{1}: 6.60 km^{2} (2.55 sq mi)
- Highest elevation: 155 m (509 ft)
- Lowest elevation: 84 m (276 ft)
- Population (2023): 617
  - Density: 93.5/km^{2} (242/sq mi)
- Time zone: UTC+01:00 (CET)
  - Summer (DST): UTC+02:00 (CEST)
- INSEE/Postal code: 77446 /77650
- ^{1} French Land Register data, which excludes lakes, ponds, glaciers > 1 km^{2} (0.386 sq mi or 247 acres) and river estuaries.

Savins (French pronunciation: [savɛ̃]) is a commune in the Seine-et-Marne department in the Île-de-France region in north-central France.

== Demographics ==
Inhabitants of Savins are called Savinois.

== See also ==
- Communes of the Seine-et-Marne department
