= Sigy, Seine-et-Marne =

Sigy
- Commune
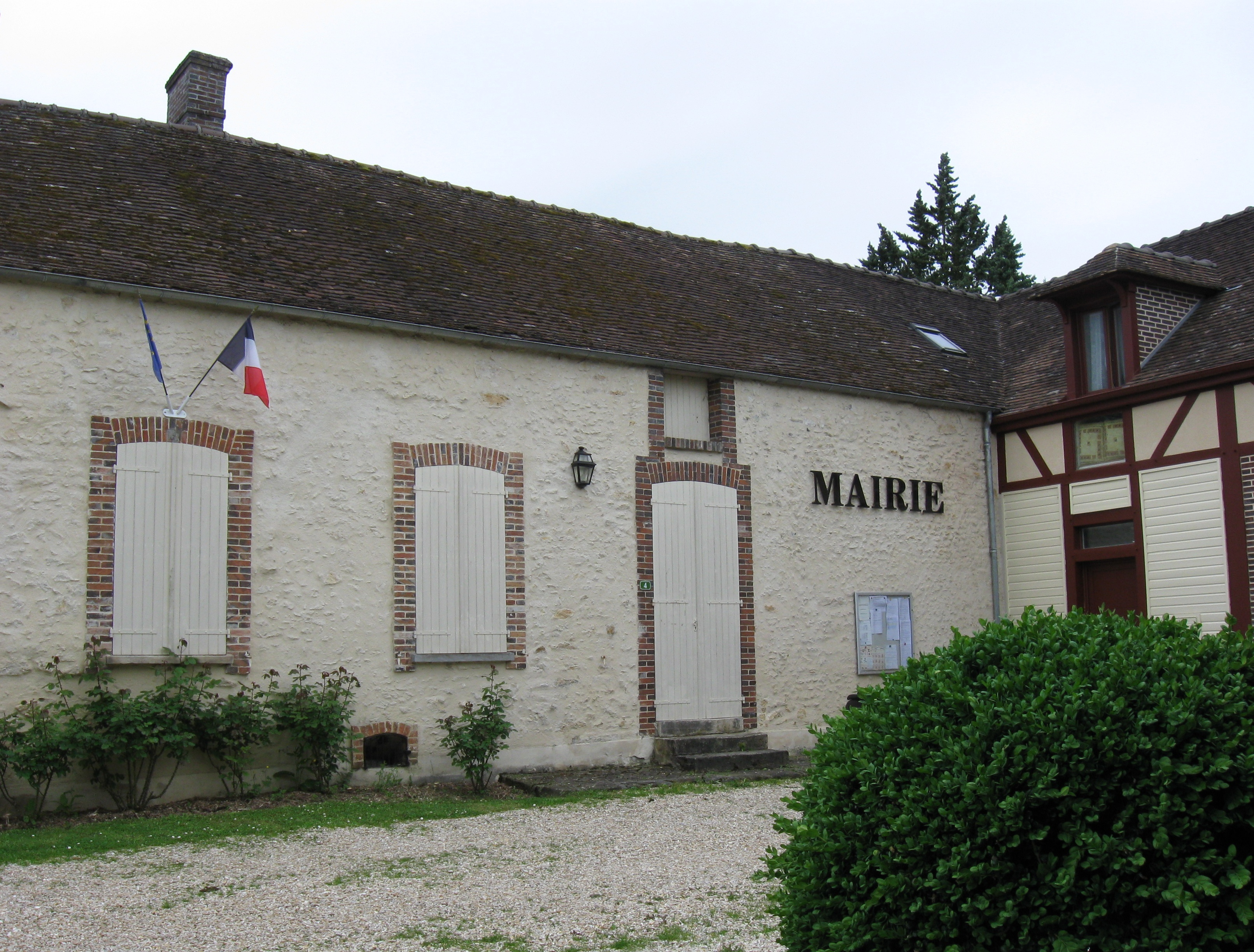
- The town hall in Sigy
- Location of Sigy
- Location within France Location within Île-de-France (region)
- Coordinates: 48°28′42″N 3°10′51″E
- Country: France
- Region: Île-de-France
- Department: Seine-et-Marne
- Arrondissement: Provins
- Canton: Provins
- Intercommunality: CC Bassée - Montois

Government
  - Mayor (2022–2026): Christophe Verbrugge
- Area^{1}: 4.73 km^{2} (1.83 sq mi)
- Highest elevation: 132 m (433 ft)
- Lowest elevation: 59 m (194 ft)
- Population (2023): 66
  - Density: 14/km^{2} (36/sq mi)
- Time zone: UTC+01:00 (CET)
  - Summer (DST): UTC+02:00 (CEST)
- INSEE/Postal code: 77452 /77520
- ^{1} French Land Register data, which excludes lakes, ponds, glaciers > 1 km^{2} (0.386 sq mi or 247 acres) and river estuaries.

Sigy (French: [siʒi]) is a commune in the Seine-et-Marne department in the Île-de-France region in north-central France.

== Demographics ==
Inhabitants of Sigy are called Sigyssois in French.

== See also ==
- Château de Sigy
- Communes of the Seine-et-Marne department
