= Hôtel de Ville, Étampes =

Town hall in Étampes, France

Hôtel de Ville
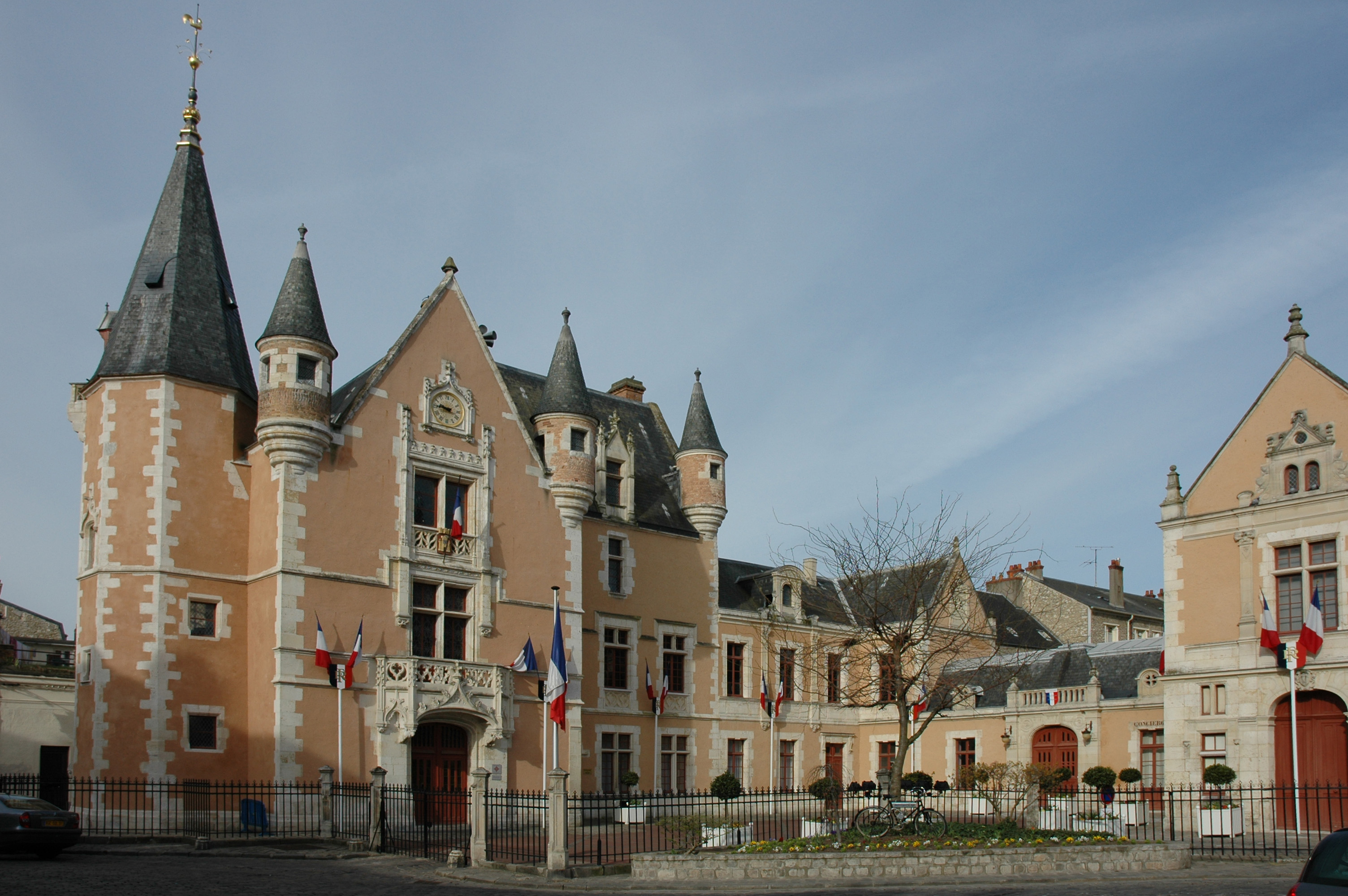
- The main frontage of the Hôtel de Ville in April 2005

General information
- Type: City hall
- Architectural style: Gothic Revival style
- Location: Étampes, France
- Coordinates: 48.4344°N 2.1613°E
- Completed: 1853

Design and construction
- Architects: Pierre and Auguste Magne

Monument historique
- Official name: Hôtel de ville
- Type: Inscrit
- Designated: 1982
- Reference no.: PA00087899

The Hôtel de Ville (French pronunciation: [otɛl də vil], City Hall) is a municipal building in Étampes, Essonne, in the southwestern suburbs of Paris, standing on Place de l'Hôtel de Ville. It was designated a monument historique by the French government in 1982.

== History ==
The complex was originally created from two houses which were constructed in around 1500. One of the houses was known as Maison de la Treille, and the other was equipped with a building for storing salt, which has since been demolished, as well as an external staircase. At that time at least one of the houses was in the ownership of the Doulcet family who had made their money from trading in seed. In March 1517, Francis I granted the town the right to have a council and a town hall. The two houses were acquired by the consuls in 1522 and 1538 and amalgamated to form a gabled hall which faced onto the market square. The complex was remodelled and expanded in the Gothic Revival style to a design by Pierre Magne and his son, Auguste Magne, in the early 1850s. Following completion of the works, the expanded building was officially opened by the mayor, François Hippolyte Collin Périer, on 16 March 1853.

As part of the mid-19th century works, the original hall was given an ornate façade with a segmental headed porch on the ground floor, a mullioned and transomed window with a balcony on the first floor, a mullioned window on the second floor, and a clock in the gable above. Bartizans were added on either side of the gable and an octagonal tower was added at the southeast end. The building was extended to the northwest in a similar style. There was also a southeast facing block, the last three bays of which were gabled and projected forward to form a courtyard. Internally, the works created a new staircase, a library, a Grand Salon (ballroom) and a Salle du Conseil (council chamber).

During the Franco-Prussian War of 1870, the mayor, Alphonse-Philippe-Auguste Brunard, received a delegation of Prussian soldiers in the courtyard and, after an altercation, was nearly shot by them.

In September 1875, the Étampes Museum was established in the southeast facing block when the widow of the sculptor, Élias Robert, donated his collection of archaeological and other historical artefacts to the town. Items in the collection included a bust of the naturalist, Étienne Geoffroy Saint-Hilaire, in the pose of the Greek god, Hermes.

Following the liberation of the town by allied soldiers on 22 August 1944, during the Second World War, the allied solders were greeted and cheered in the courtyard. The president of France, Charles de Gaulle, visited the town and delivered a speech in the courtyard in June 1965.

== Sources ==
- Guibourgé, Léon (1957). "Étampes Ville Royale". Le Corpus Étampois. pp. 96–100.
