= Étampes =

Subprefecture and commune in Île-de-France, France

- Subprefecture and commune
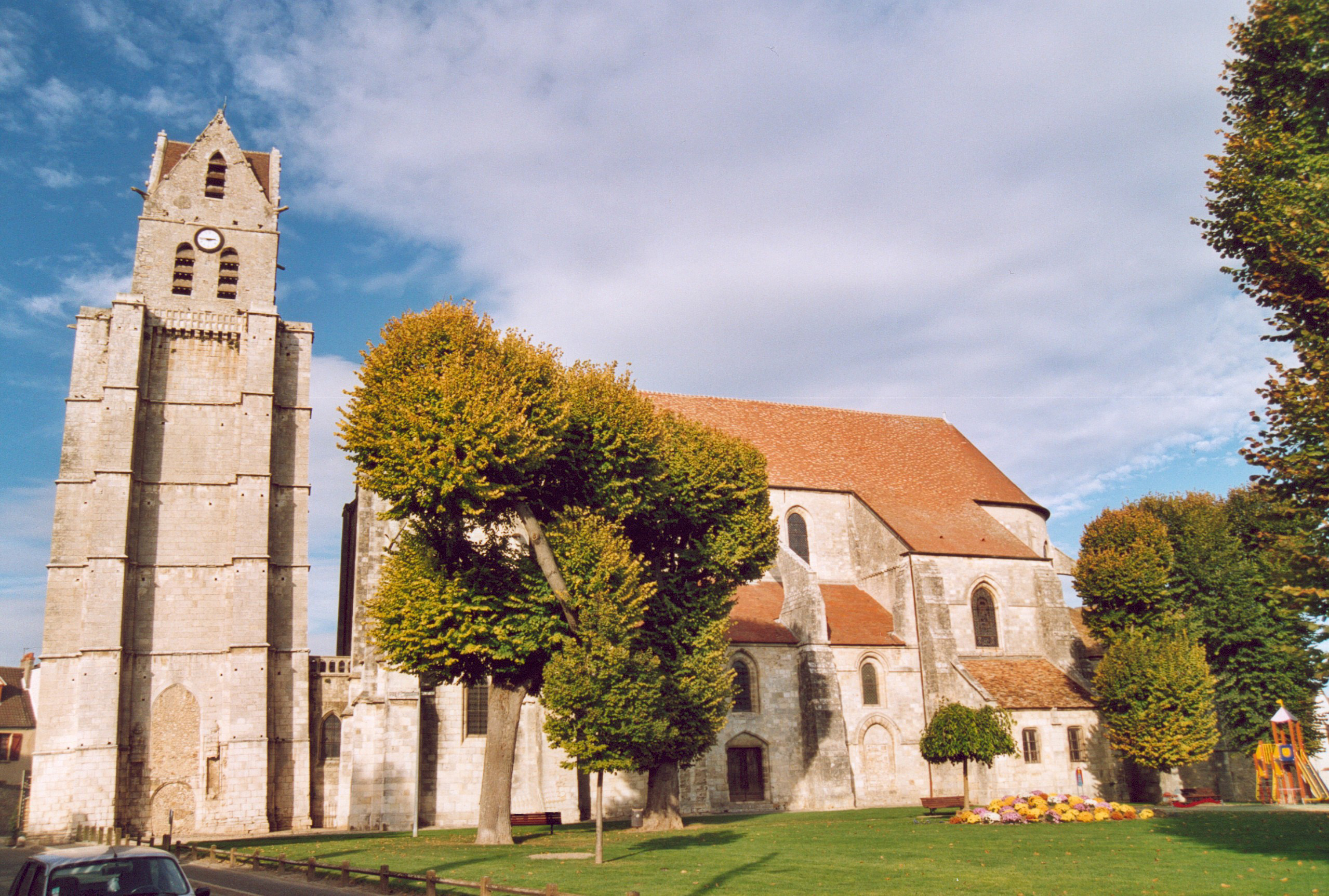
- Saint Martin

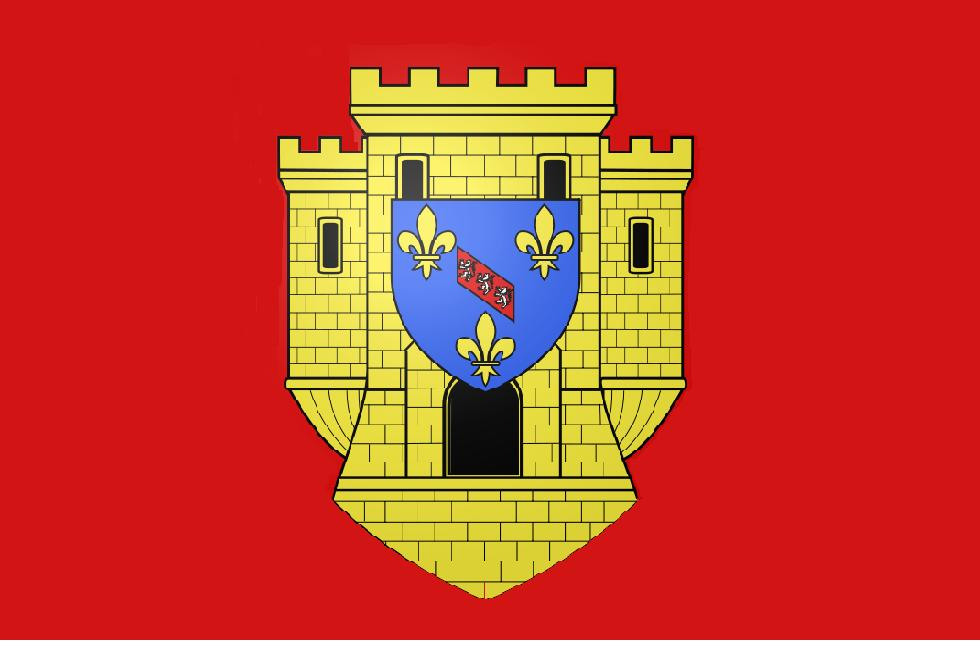
- Flag Coat of arms
- Location of Étampes
- Location within France Location within Île-de-France (region)
- Coordinates: 48°26′03″N 2°09′41″E
- Country: France
- Region: Île-de-France
- Department: Essonne
- Arrondissement: Étampes
- Canton: Étampes
- Intercommunality: CA Étampois Sud Essonne

Government
  - Mayor (2020–2026): Franck Marlin
- Area^{1}: 40.92 km^{2} (15.80 sq mi)
- Highest elevation: 156 m (512 ft)
- Lowest elevation: 66 m (217 ft)
- Population (2023): 26,857
  - Density: 656.3/km^{2} (1,700/sq mi)
- Time zone: UTC+01:00 (CET)
  - Summer (DST): UTC+02:00 (CEST)
- INSEE/Postal code: 91223 /91150
- ^{1} French Land Register data, which excludes lakes, ponds, glaciers > 1 km^{2} (0.386 sq mi or 247 acres) and river estuaries.

Étampes (French: [etɑ̃p]) is a commune in the metropolitan area of Paris, France. It is located 48.1 km (29.9 mi) south-southwest from the center of Paris (as the crow flies). Étampes is a sub-prefecture of the Essonne department.

Étampes, together with the neighboring communes of Morigny-Champigny and Brières-les-Scellés, form an urban area of 30,881 inhabitants (2018). This urban area is a "satellite city" of Paris.

== History ==
The name Étampes derives from the Proto-Germanic *stampōną, meaning 'to squeeze or compress', perhaps referring to fulling.

Étampes (Latin: Stampae) existed at the beginning of the 7th century and in the early Middle Ages belonged to the crown domain. During the Middle Ages it was the scene of several councils, the most notable of which took place in 1130 and resulted in the recognition of Innocent II as the legitimate pope. In 1652, during the war of the Fronde it suffered severely at the hands of the royal troops under Turenne.

== Geography ==
Étampes lies on the river Chalouette, a tributary of the Juine, which borders the eastern outskirts of the serene town.

Inhabitants of Étampes are known as Étampois.

== Transport ==
Étampes is served by two stations on Paris RER line C: Étampes and Saint-Martin-d'Étampes. Étampes station is also served by regional trains to Orléans and Paris.

== Population ==
Historical population

Year	Pop.	±% p.a.
1793	7,027	—
1800	7,687	+1.29%
1806	8,333	+1.35%
1821	7,693	−0.53%
1831	8,109	+0.53%
1836	7,896	−0.53%
1841	7,968	+0.18%
1846	8,157	+0.47%
1851	8,083	−0.18%
1856	8,066	−0.04%
1861	8,220	+0.38%
1866	8,228	+0.02%
1872	7,789	−0.91%
1876	7,840	+0.16%
1881	7,710	−0.33%
1886	8,461	+1.88%
1891	8,573	+0.26%
1896	8,637	+0.15%
1901	9,001	+0.83%

Year	Pop.	±% p.a.
1906	9,245	+0.54%
1911	9,454	+0.45%
1921	9,925	+0.49%
1926	10,067	+0.28%
1931	9,944	−0.25%
1936	10,610	+1.30%
1946	10,425	−0.18%
1954	11,890	+1.66%
1962	13,515	+1.61%
1968	16,493	+3.37%
1975	19,651	+2.53%
1982	19,386	−0.19%
1990	21,457	+1.28%
1999	21,839	+0.20%
2007	22,306	+0.26%
2012	24,320	+1.74%
2017	25,092	+0.63%
2023	26,857	+1.14%

Source: EHESS and INSEE (1968-2023)

== Sights ==
A fine view of Étampes is obtained from the Tour Guinette, a keep (now ruined) built by Louis VI in the 12th century on an eminence on the other side of the railway. Notre-Dame du Fort, the chief church, dates from the 11th and 12th centuries; irregular in plan, it is remarkable for a fine Romanesque tower and spire, and for the crenellated wall which partly surrounds it. The interior contains ancient paintings and other artistic works. St Basile (12th and 16th centuries), preserves a Romanesque doorway, and St Martin (12th and 13th centuries), has a leaning tower of the 16th century.

The civil buildings offer little interest, but two houses named after Anne de Pisseleu, mistress of Francis I, and Diane de Poitiers, mistress of Henry II, are graceful examples of Renaissance architecture. In the square there is a statue of the naturalist, Étienne Geoffroy Saint-Hilaire, who was born in Étampes.

== Monuments and tourist attractions ==
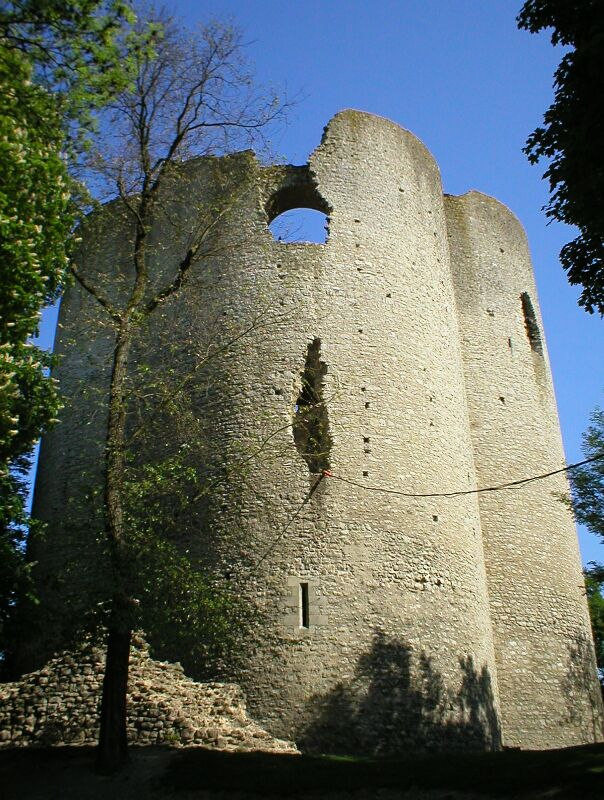
La Tour Guinette-the remains of Château d'Étampes

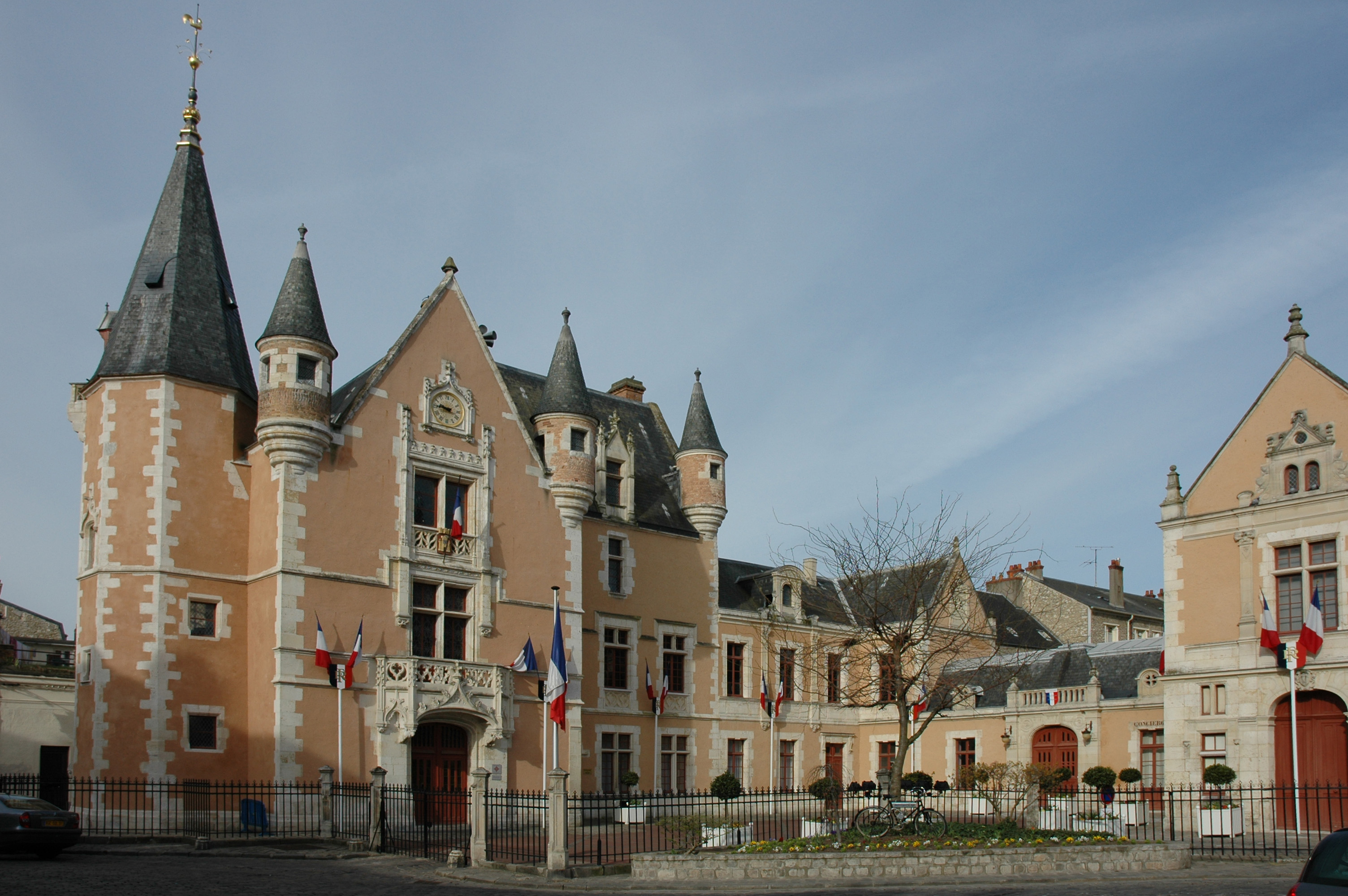
Hôtel de Ville

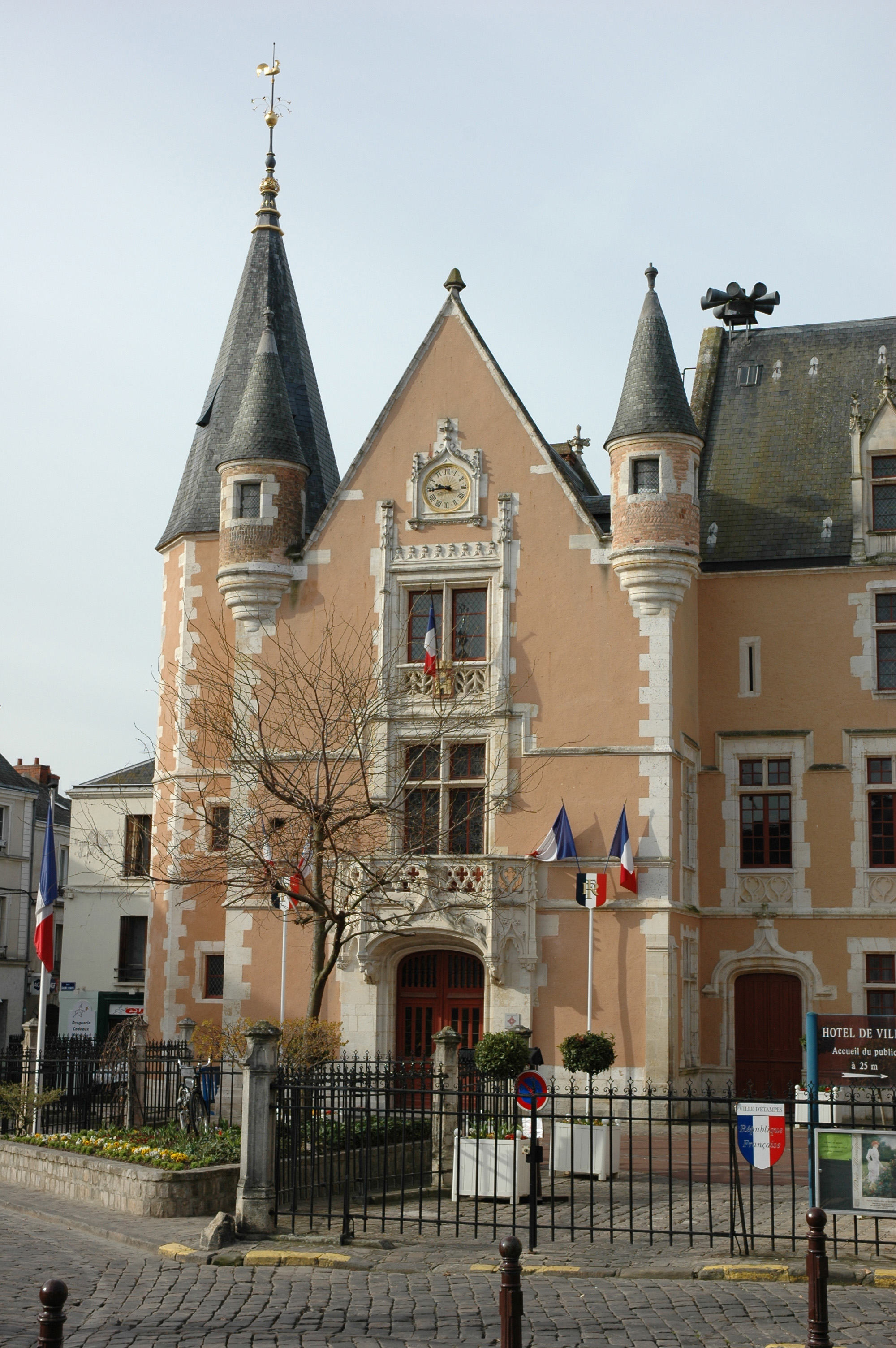
Hôtel de Ville
- The Hôtel de Ville which was enlarged and remodelled in 1852.
- Hôtel Anne de Pisseleu
- Théâtre built by the architect Gabriel Davioud in 1851-1852, paid for by a public subscription
- Regional leisure park (wave pool)
- Sculptures created by André Deluol: Vénus anadyomène, La Terre, Le Corbeau et le Renard, Jeune fille et oiseau, Un Ange, Deux danseuses nues
- The "Pergola de la Douce France" is located in the gardens of the Tour Guinette in Étampes and was part of a larger composition created in 1925 for the Exposition des Arts décoratifs et industriels. It was acquired by Étampes in 1934. The work comprises four large stone blocks on which sixteen bas-reliefs have been created by various sculptors. Georges Saupique executed the reliefs "Le Saint Graal" and "L'Aurochs".

=== Religious edifices ===
- Église Notre Dame du Fort
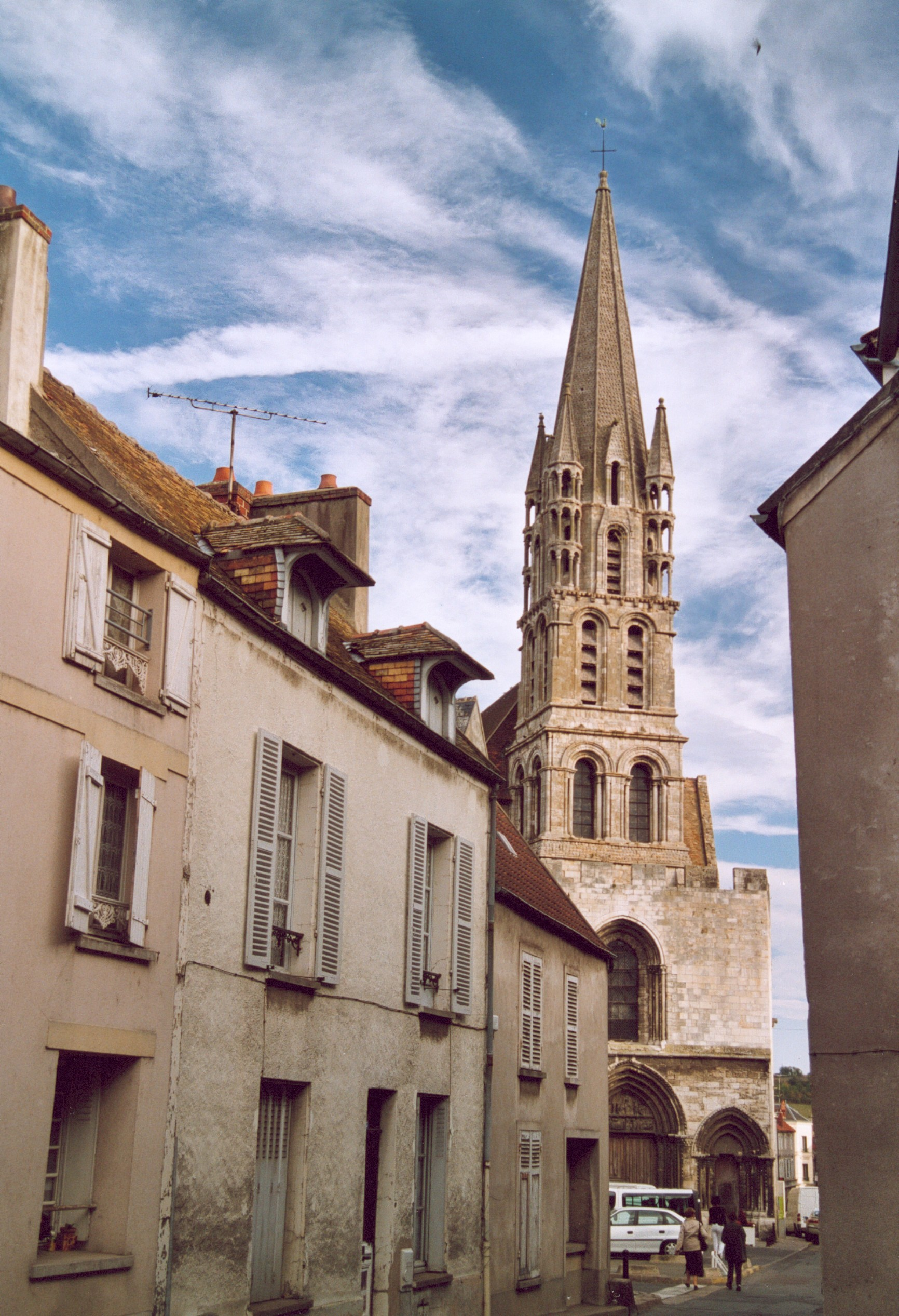
Église Notre-Dame-du-Fort

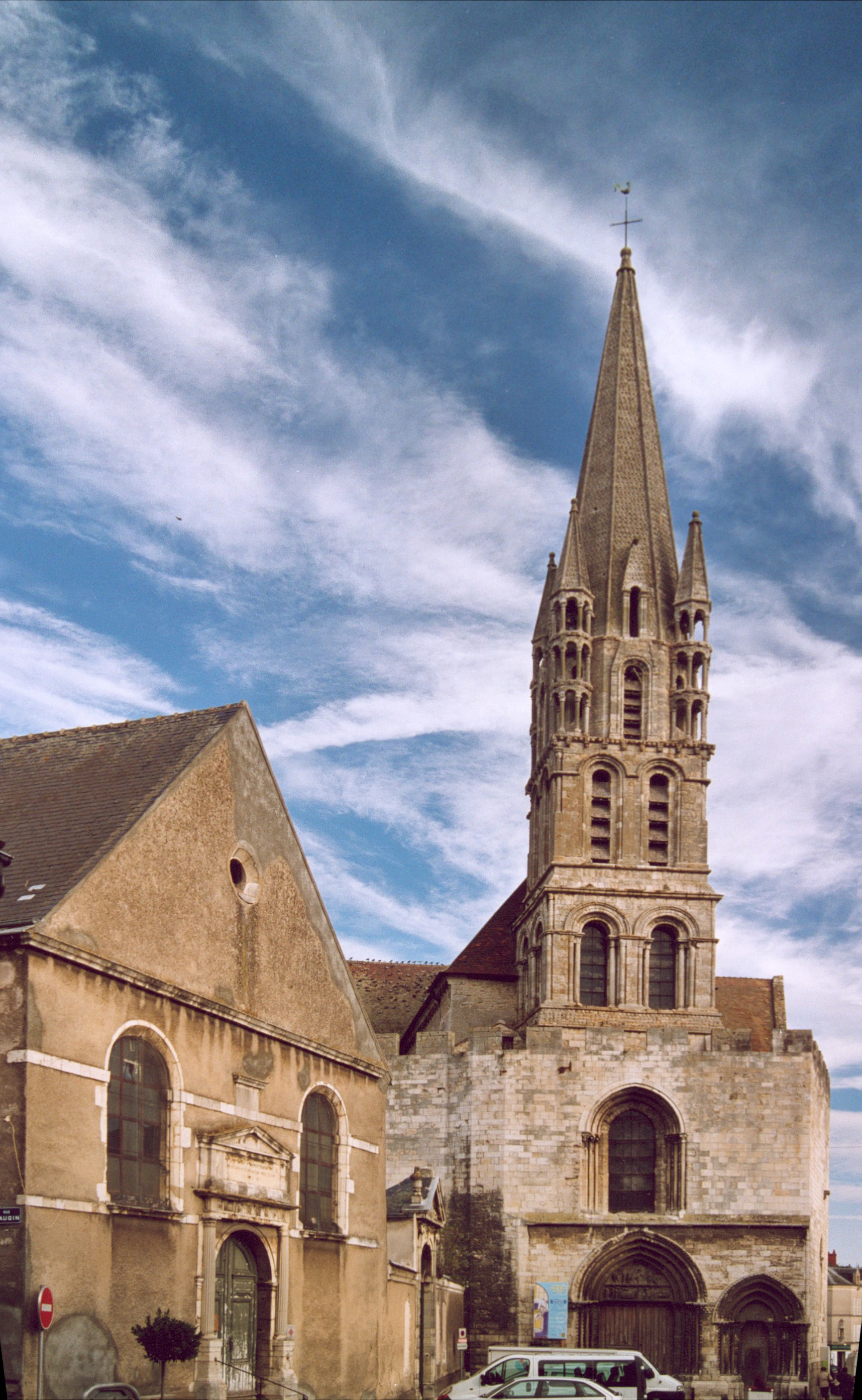
Église Notre-Dame-du-Fort

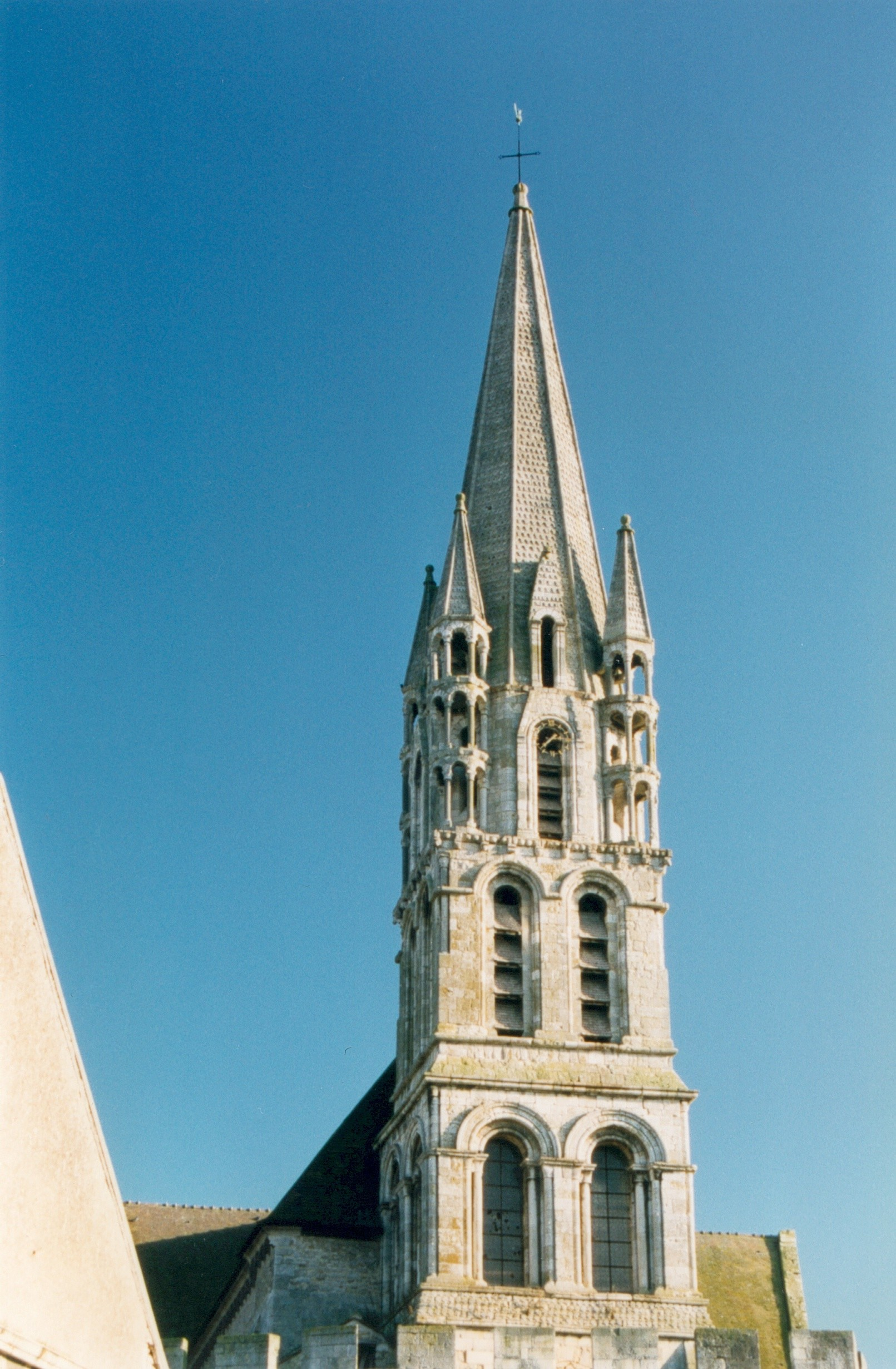
Église Notre-Dame-du-Fort

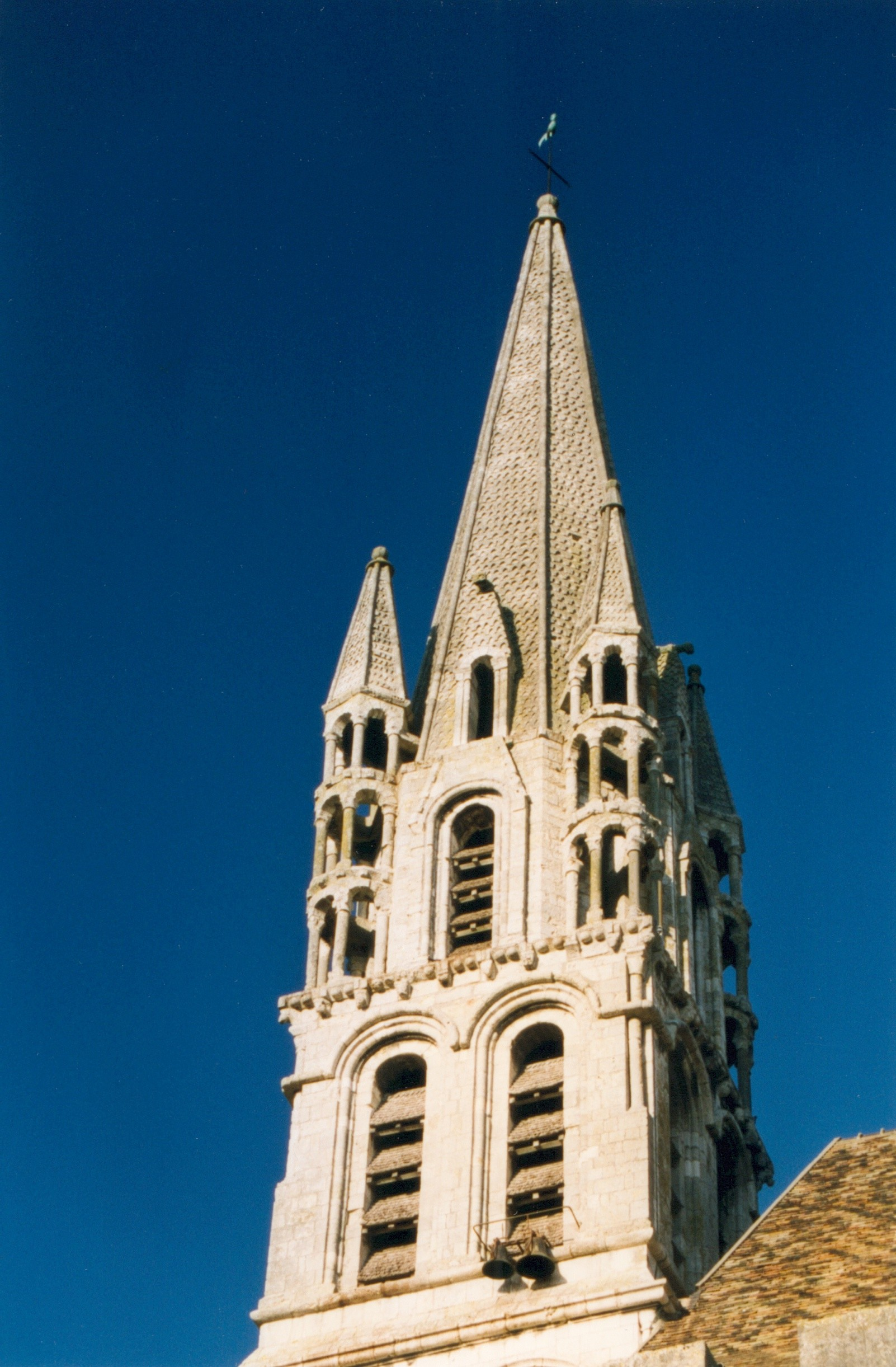
Église Notre-Dame-du-Fort
- Église Saint-Basile
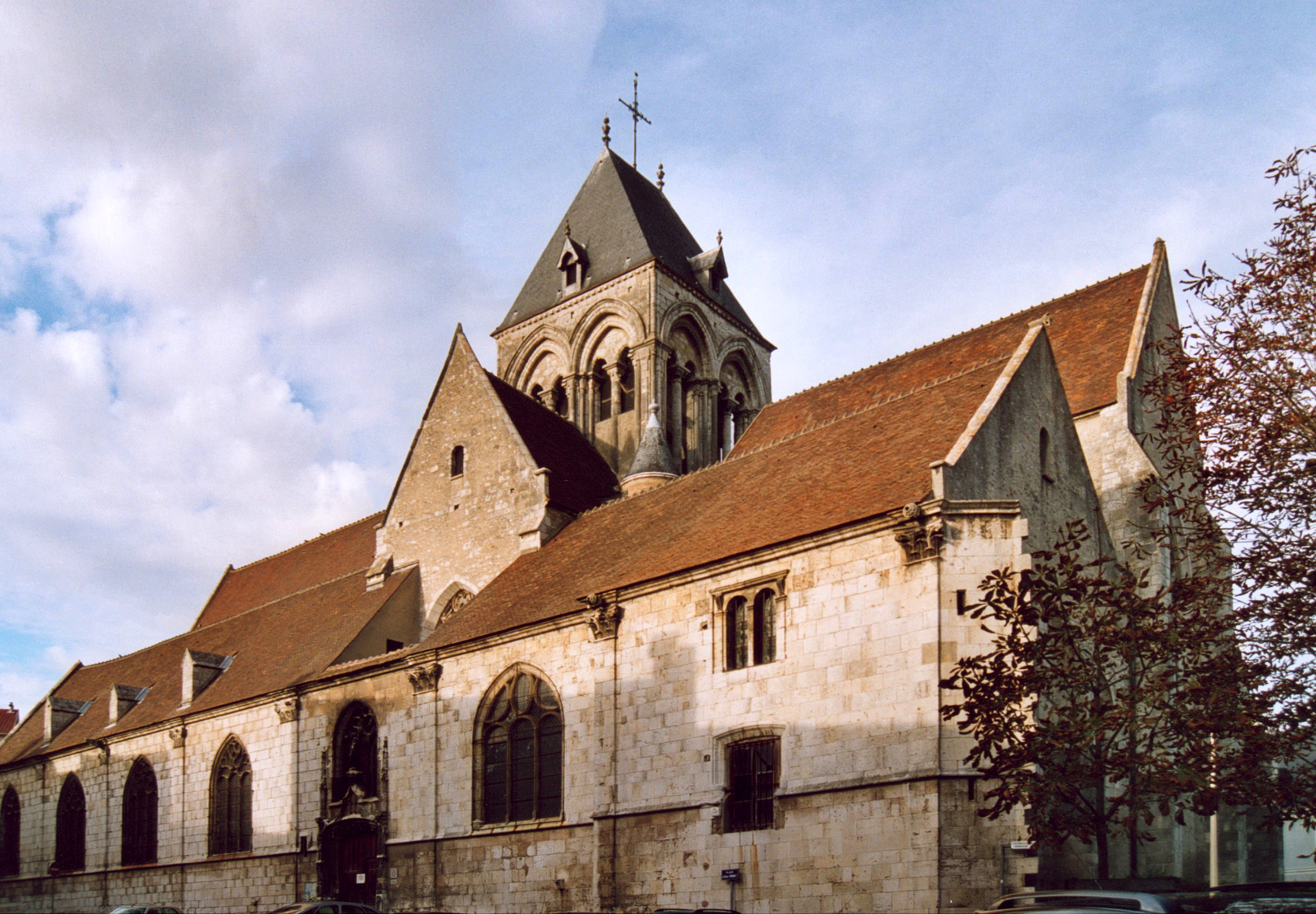
Église Saint-Basile

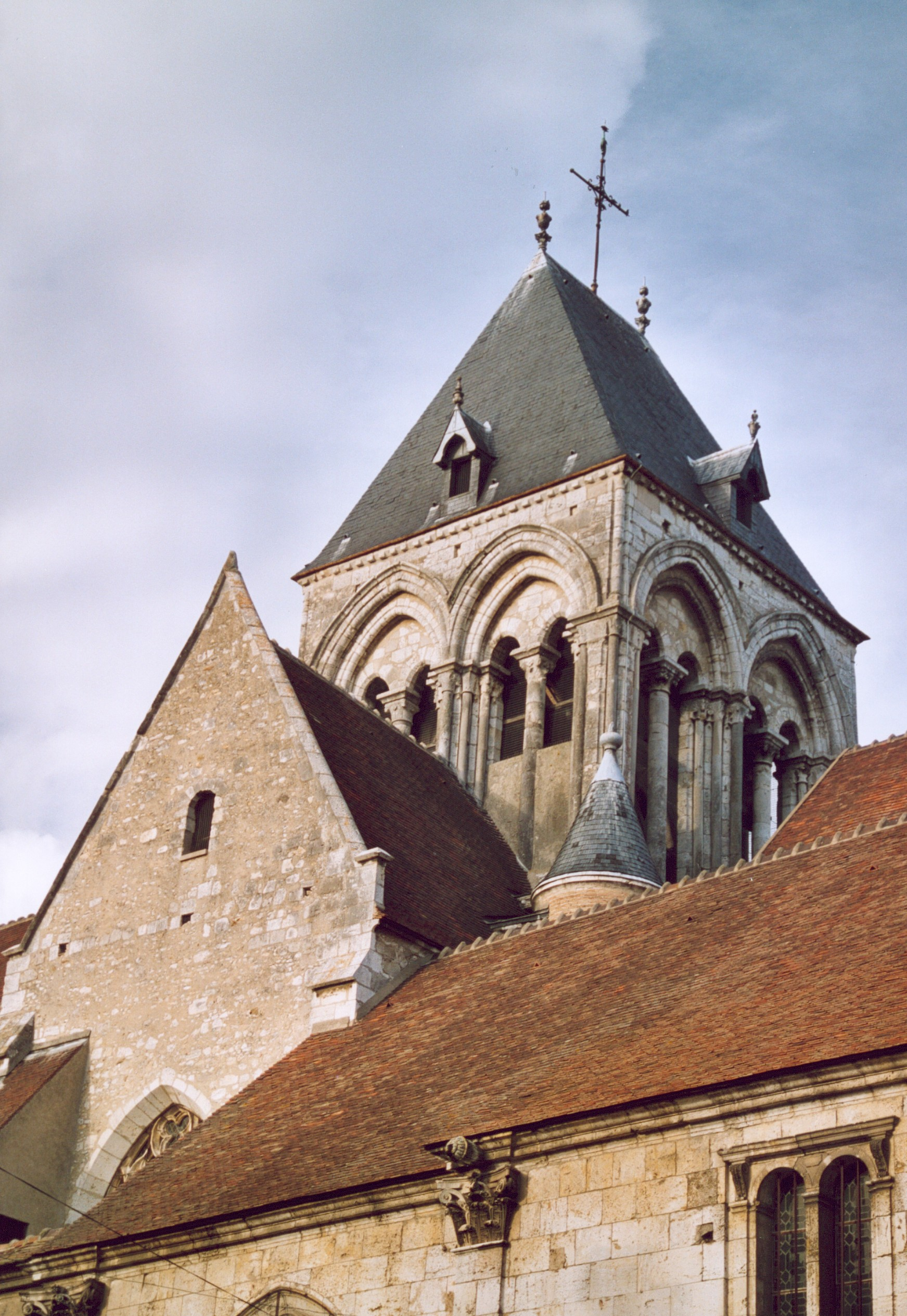
Église Saint-Basile

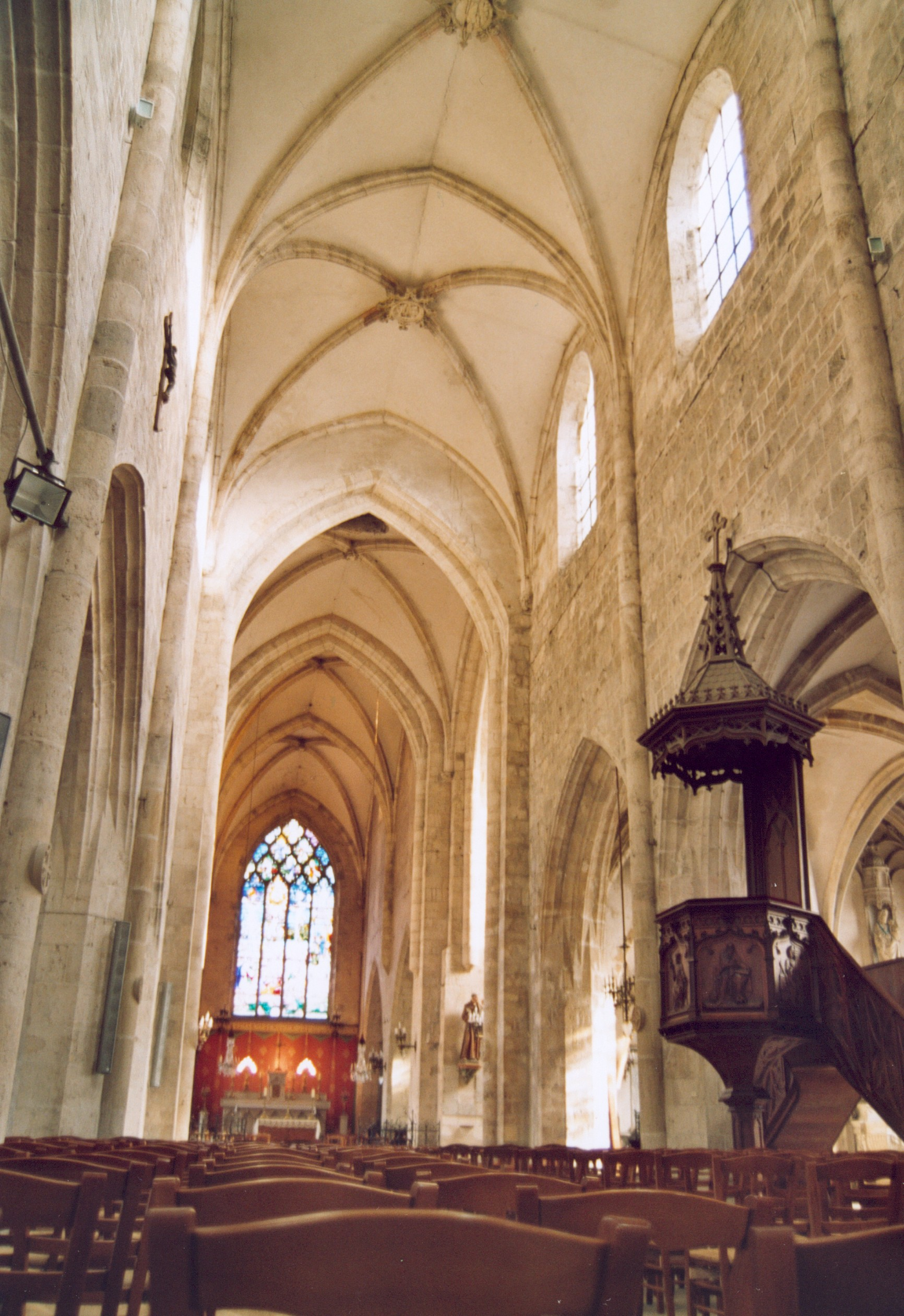
Église Saint-Basile
- Église Saint-Martin, famous for its leaning tour
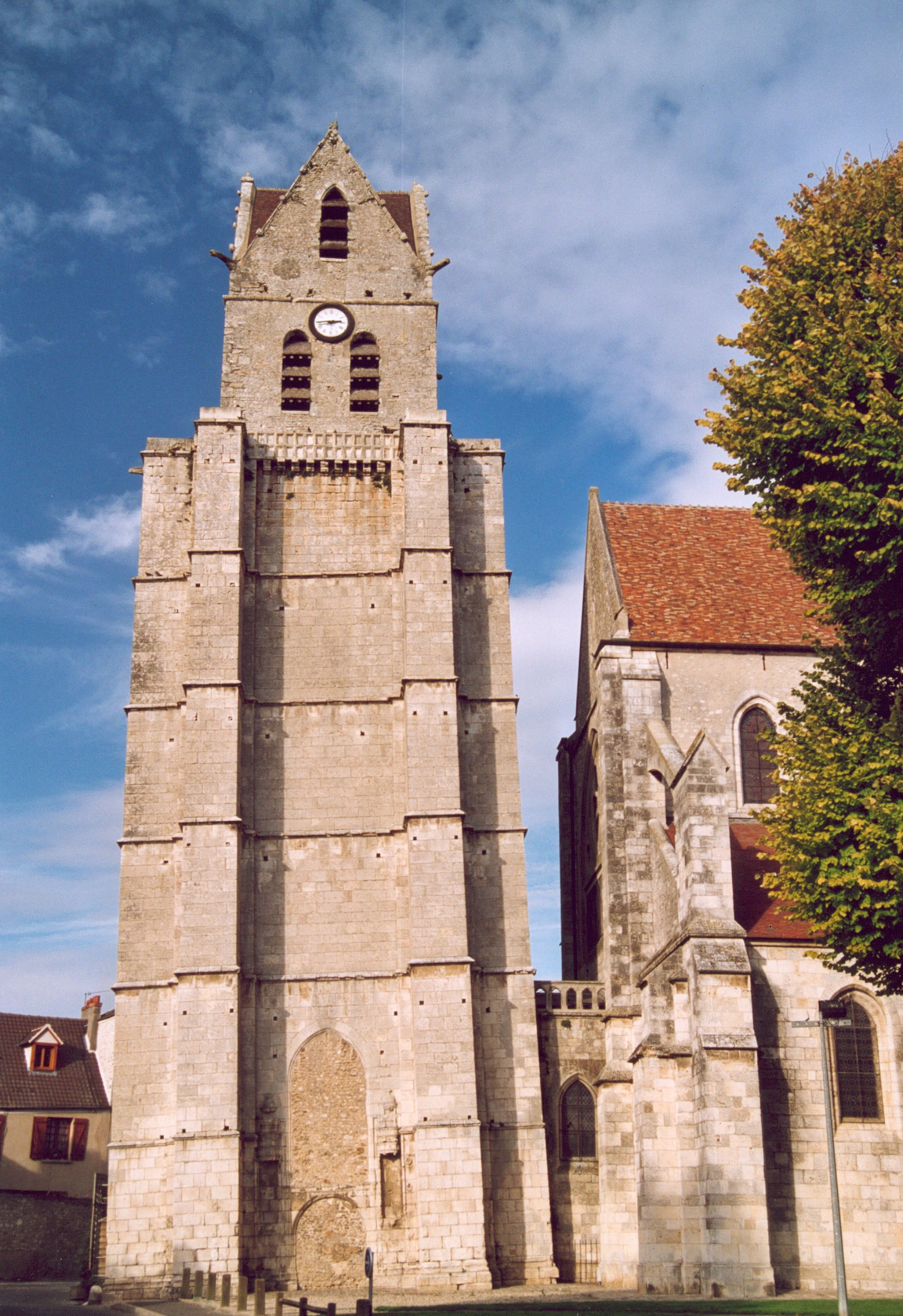
Église Saint-Martin

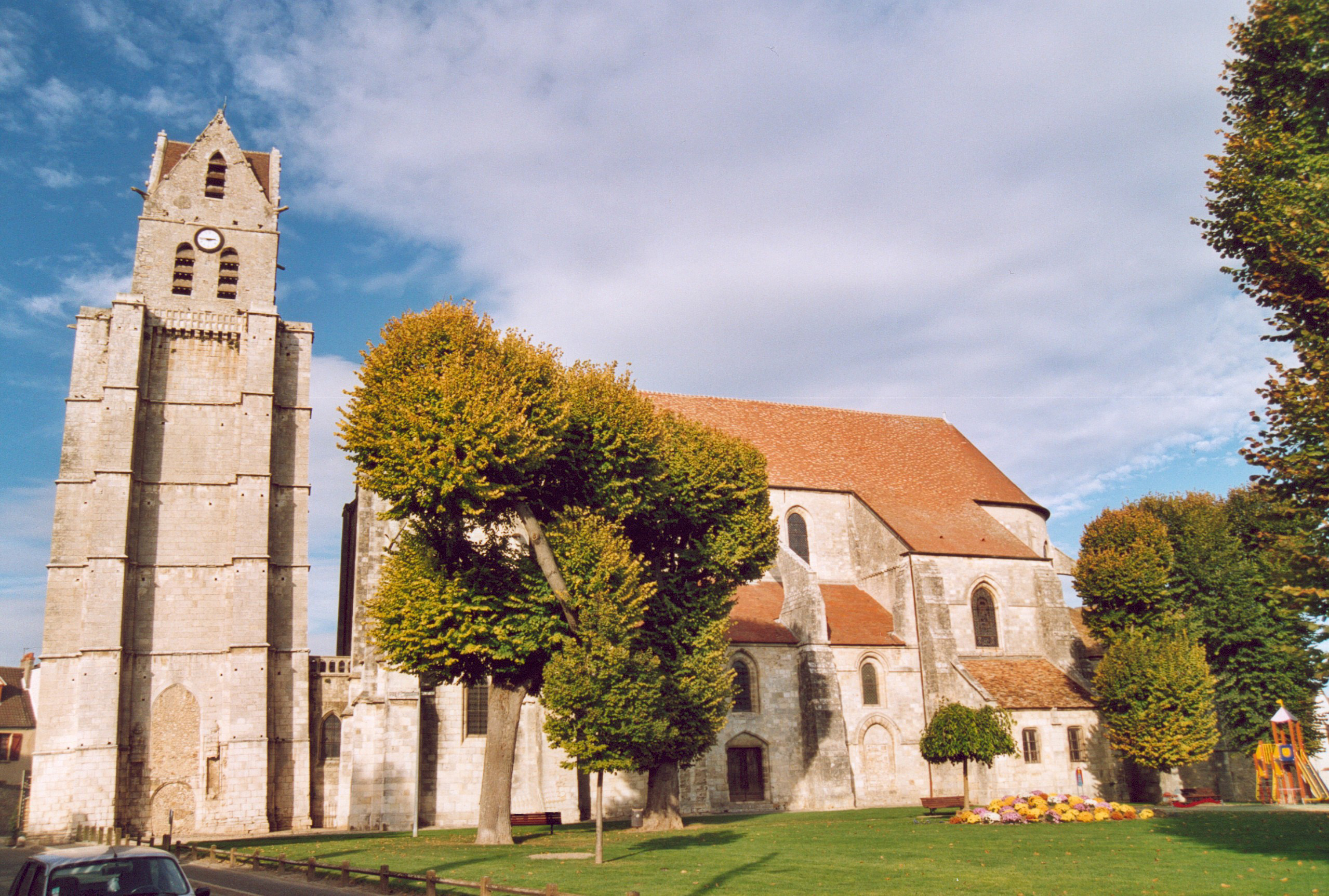
Église Saint-Martin

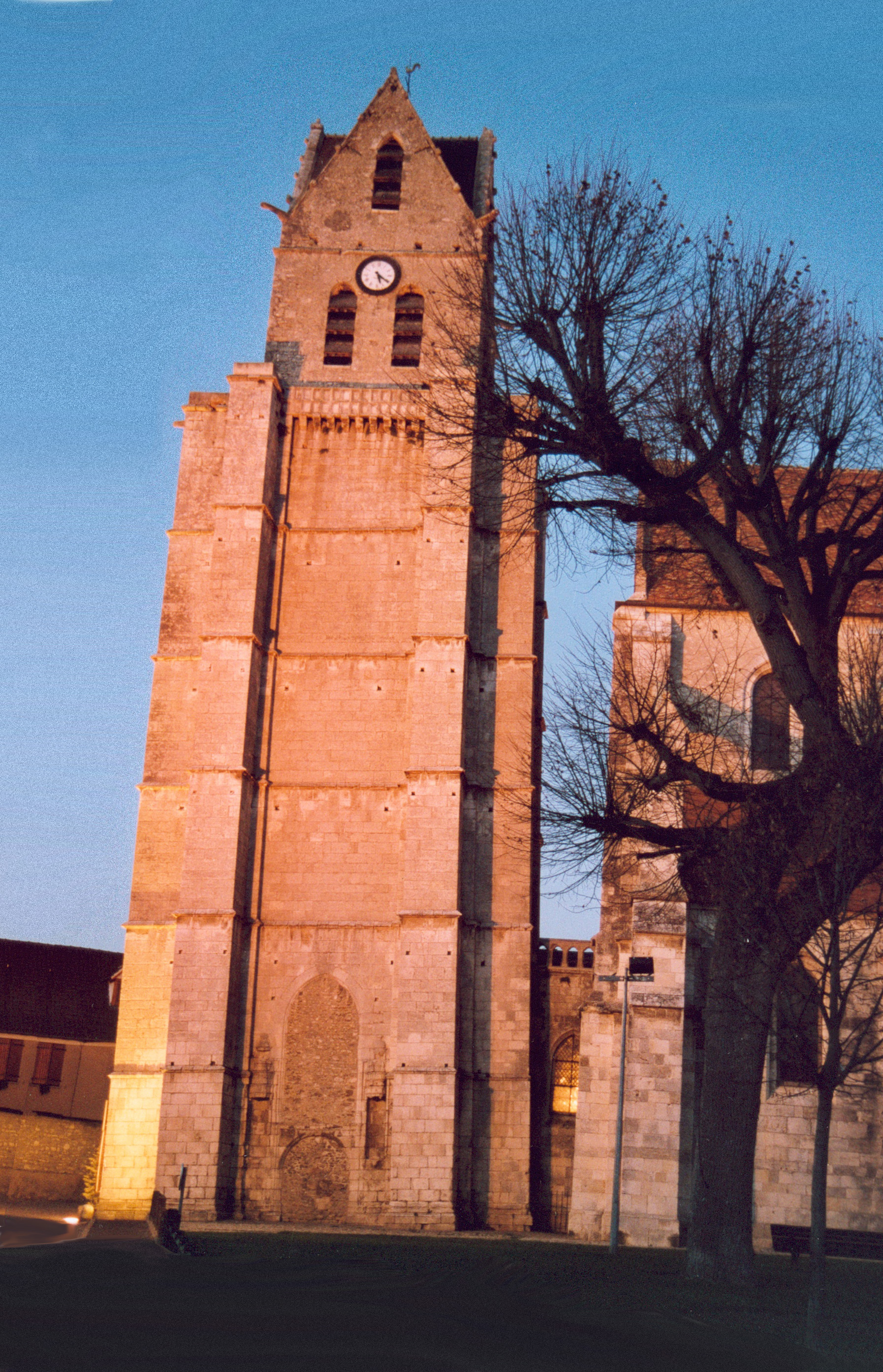
Église Saint-Martin

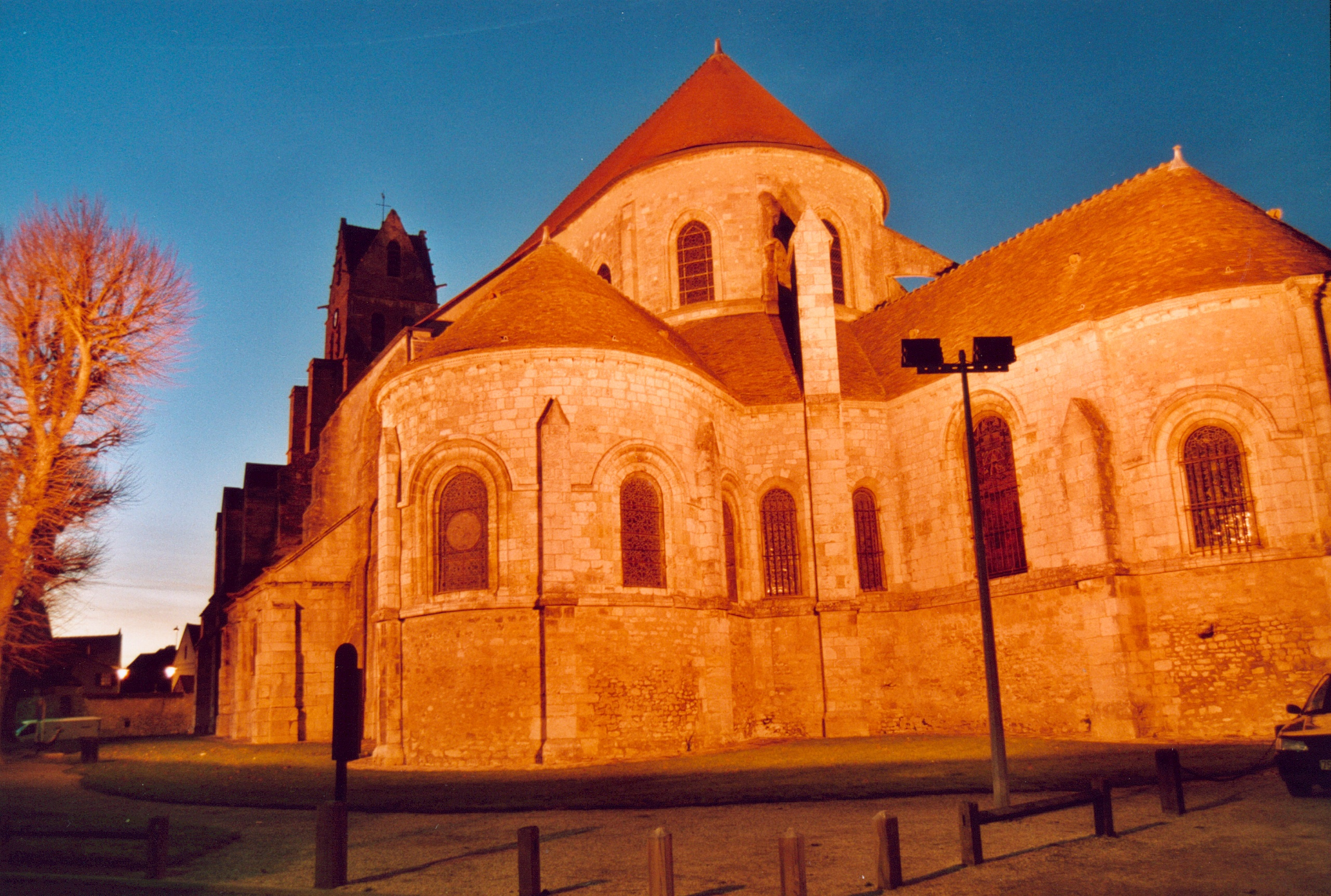
Église Saint-Martin
- Église Saint-Gilles
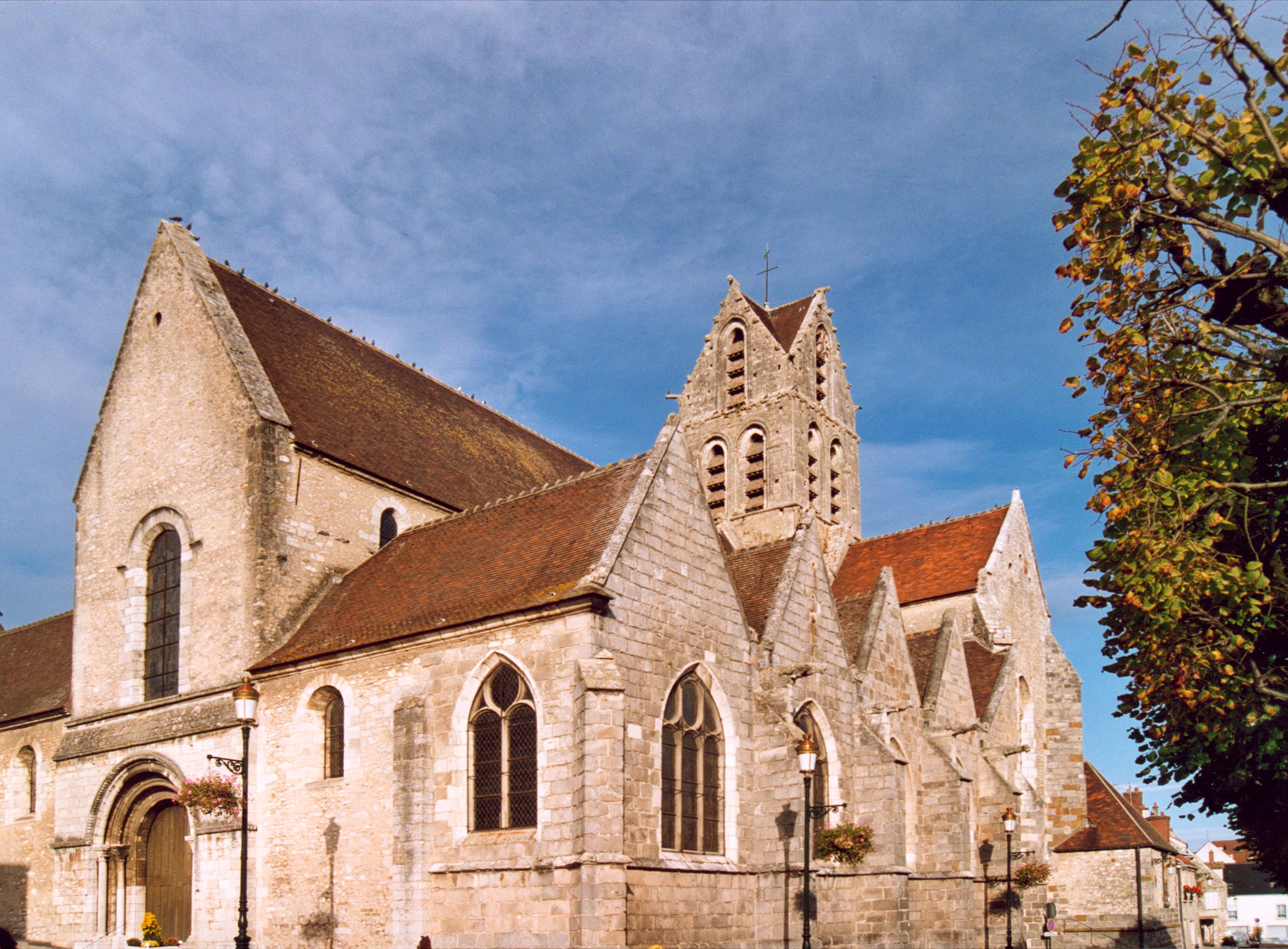
Église Saint-Gilles

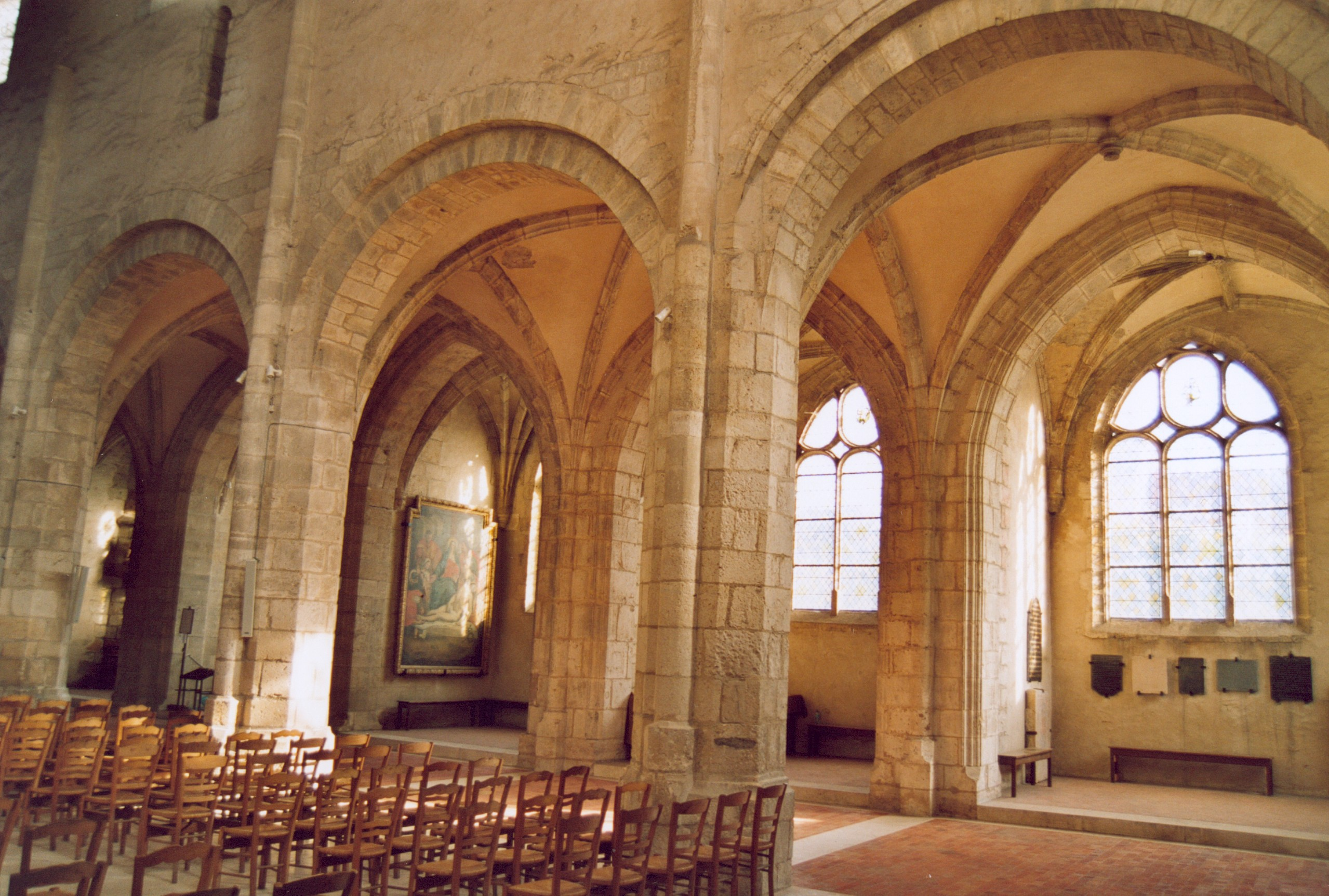
Église Saint-Gilles

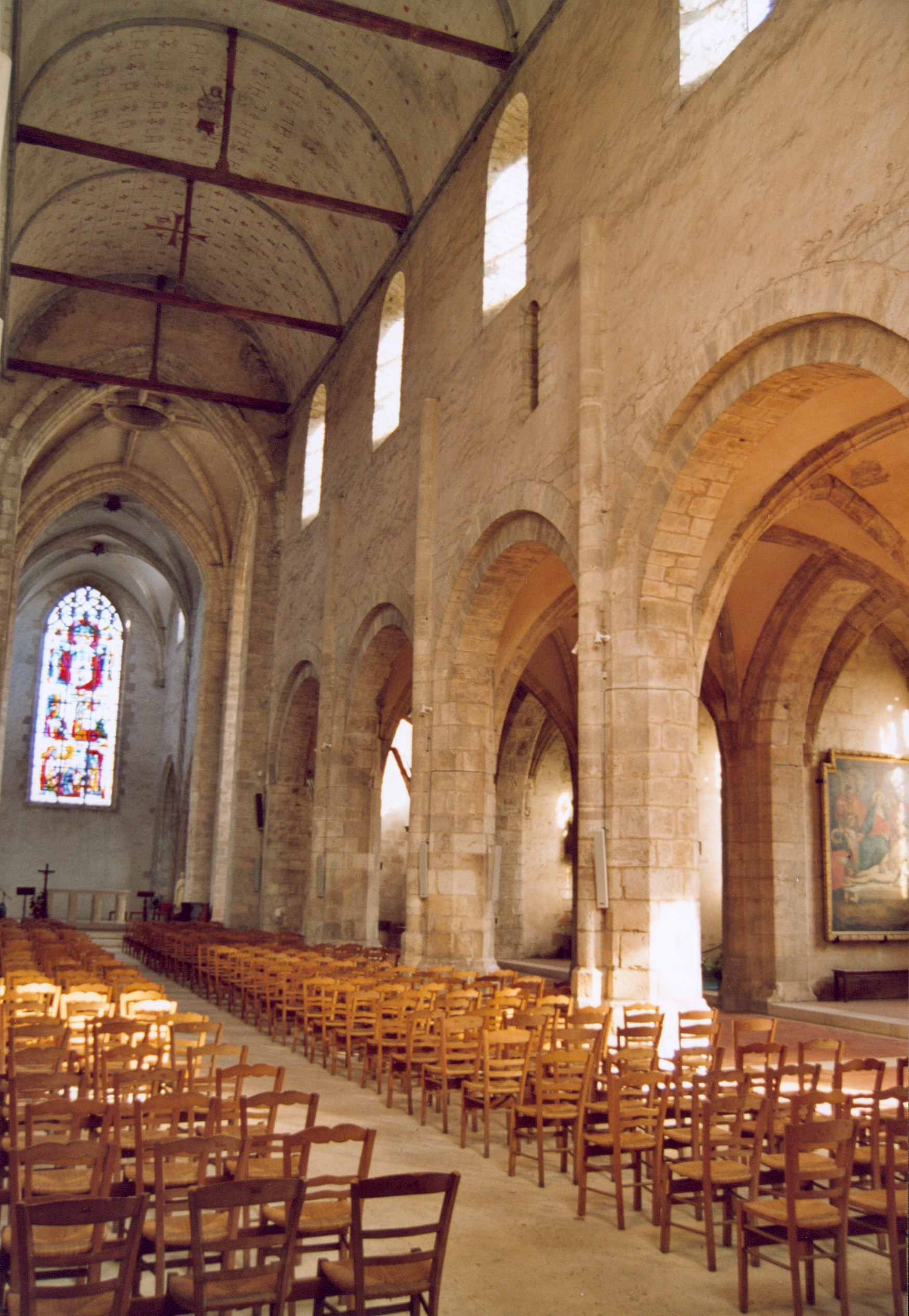
Église Saint-Gilles

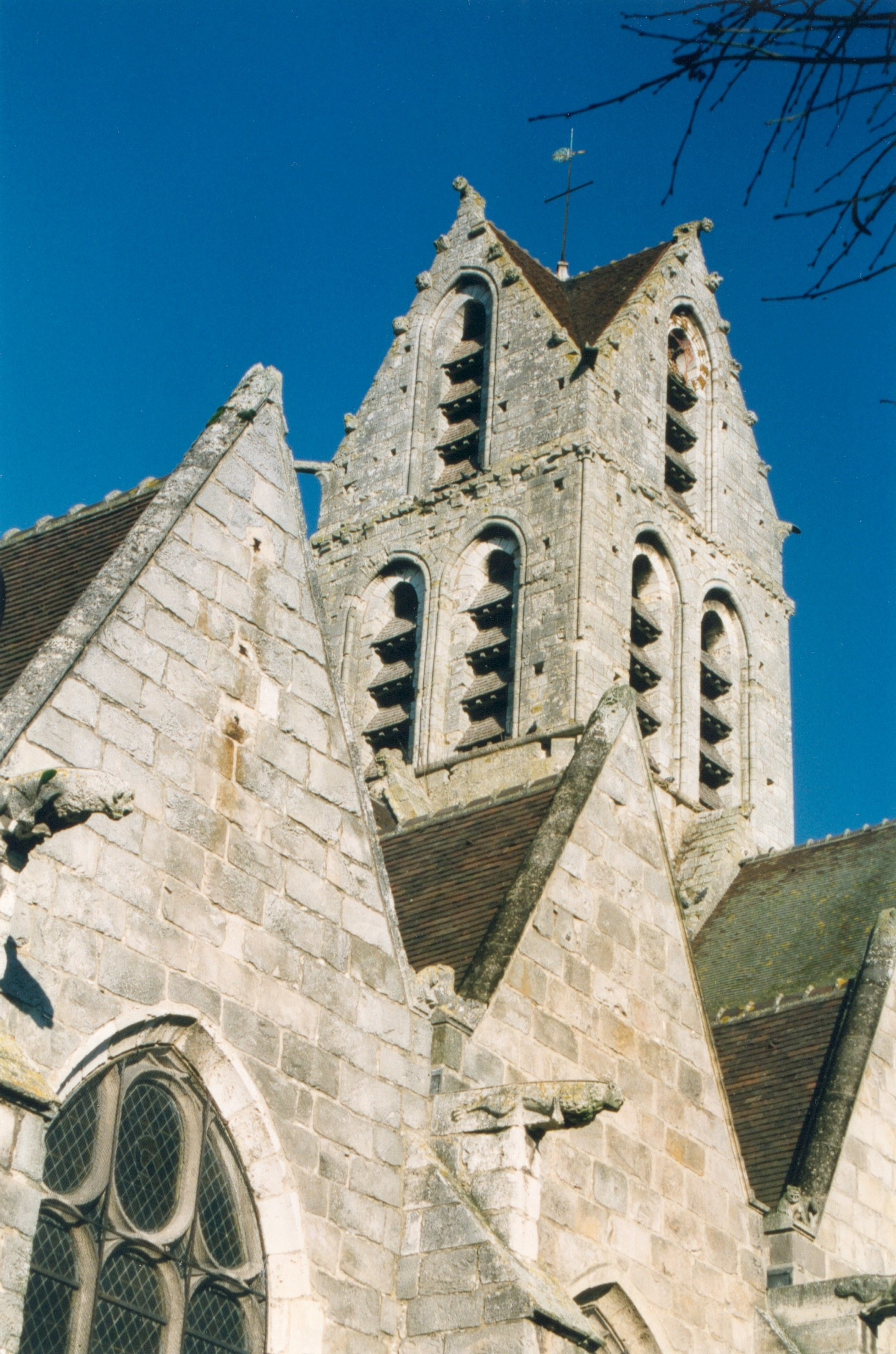
Église Saint-Gilles

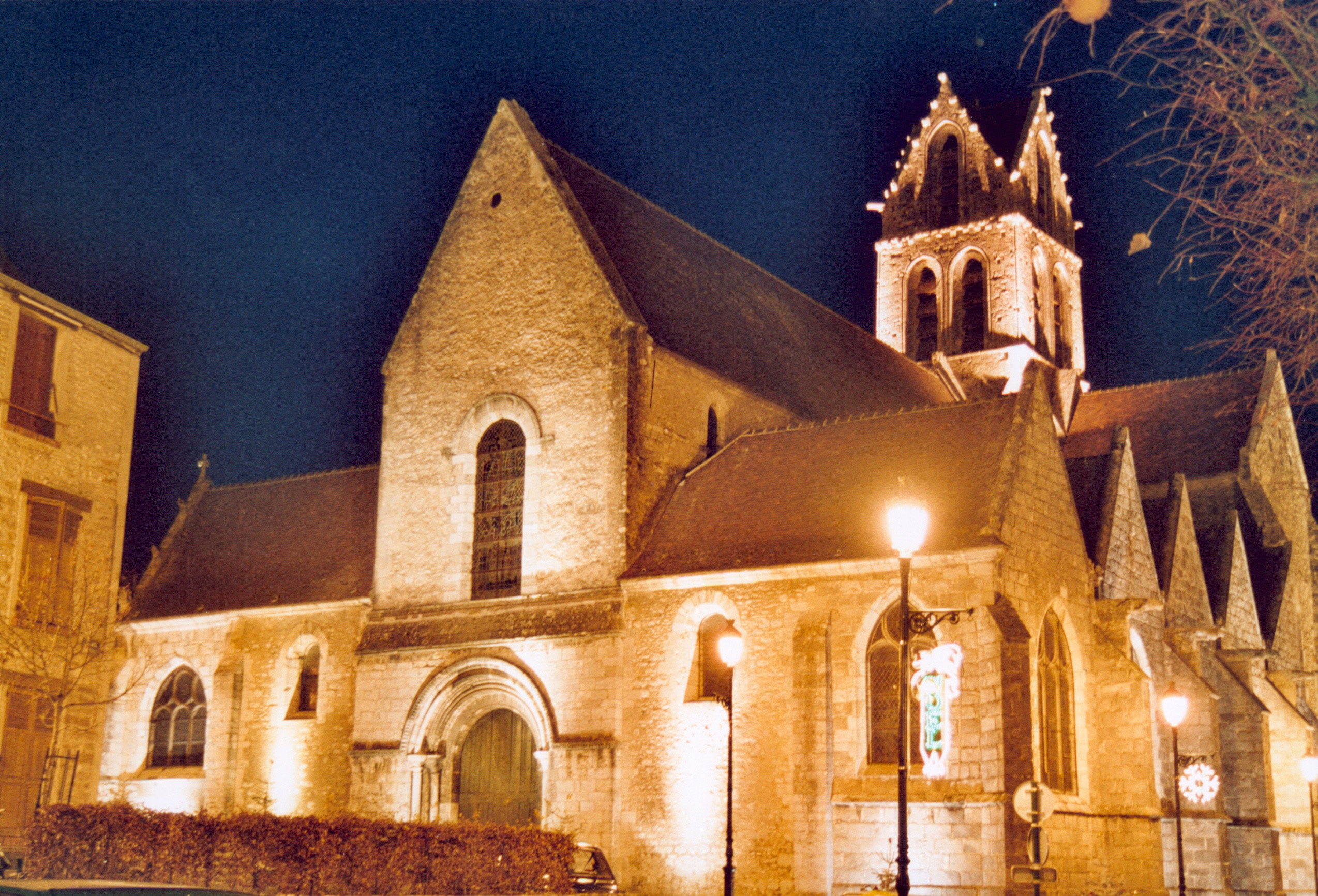
Église Saint-Gilles

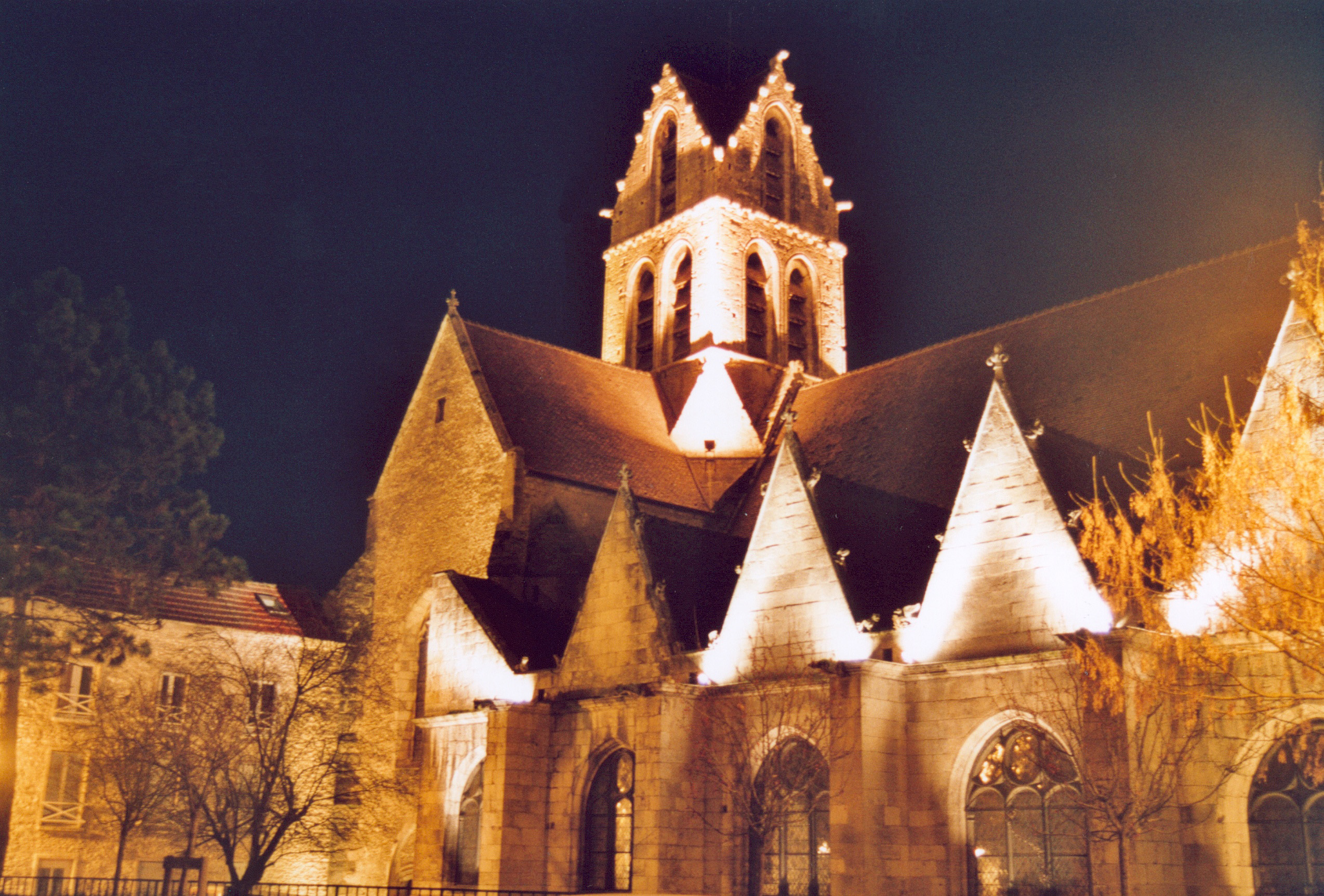
Église Saint-Gilles

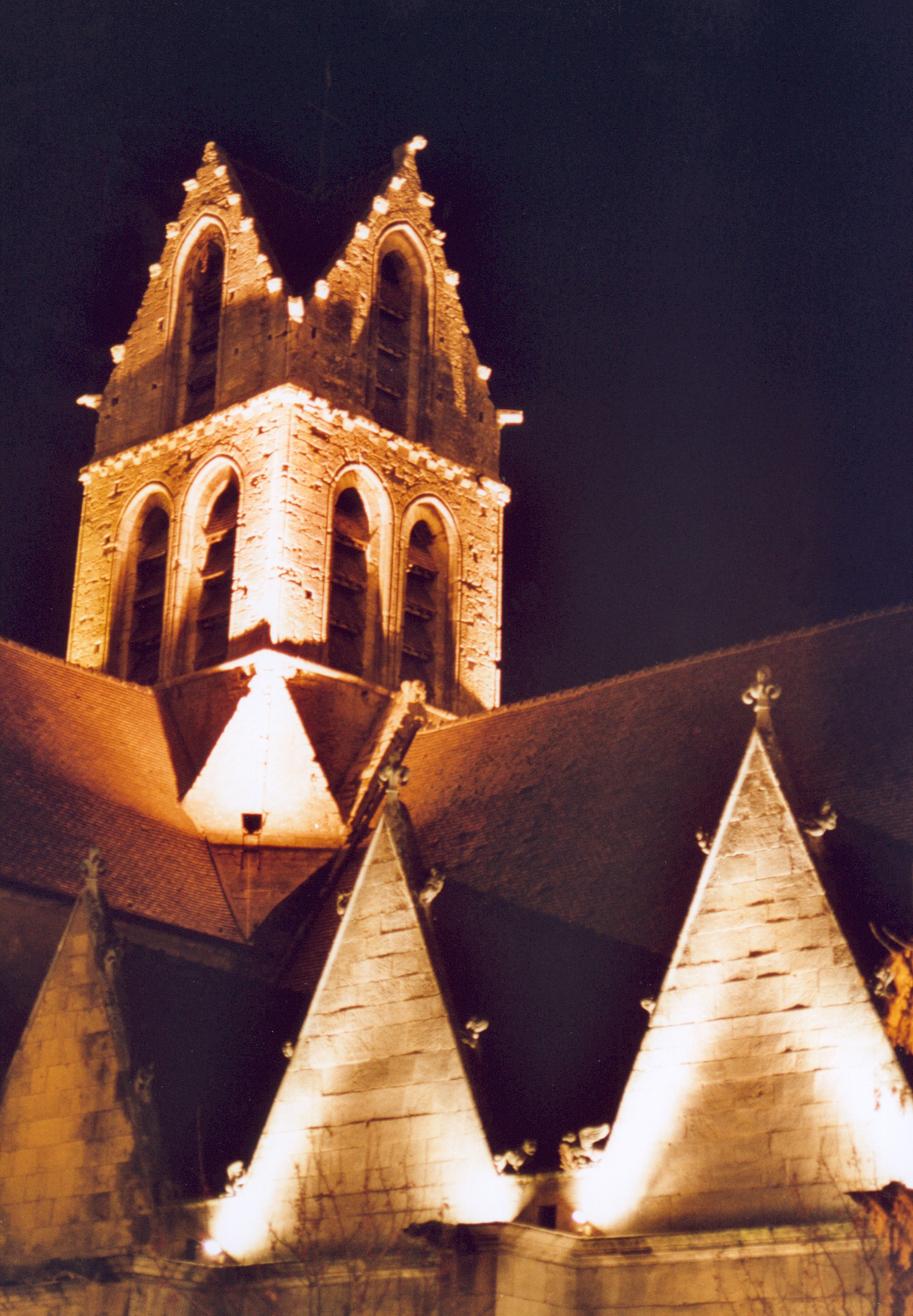
Église Saint-Gilles
- Chapelle de Gérofosse
- Chapelle de Guinette

== Notable people ==
- Louise Abbéma (1853–1927), painter, sculptor, and designer
- Arnaud Beltrame, gendarme killed in the Carcassonne and Trèbes attack, 23 March 2018
- Michel Crépu (born 1954), writer and literary critic, winner of the 2012 Prix des Deux Magots
- Theobald of Étampes (born before 1080, died after 1120)
- Jean-Marc Fessard (born 1969), classical clarinetist
- Jean-Victor Makengo, footballer
- Bilal Ouali, footballer
- Chan Parker (1925–1999), Wife of Jazz musician Charlie Parker, later married saxophonist Phill Woods.
- Étienne Geoffroy Saint-Hilaire (1772–1844), naturalist
- Yacouba Sylla, footballer

== Miscellaneous ==
The prestigious École Philippe Gaulier is located in Étampes.

== See also ==
- Communes of the Essonne department
- Counts and Dukes of Étampes
- Georges Saupique
