= Château d'Étampes =

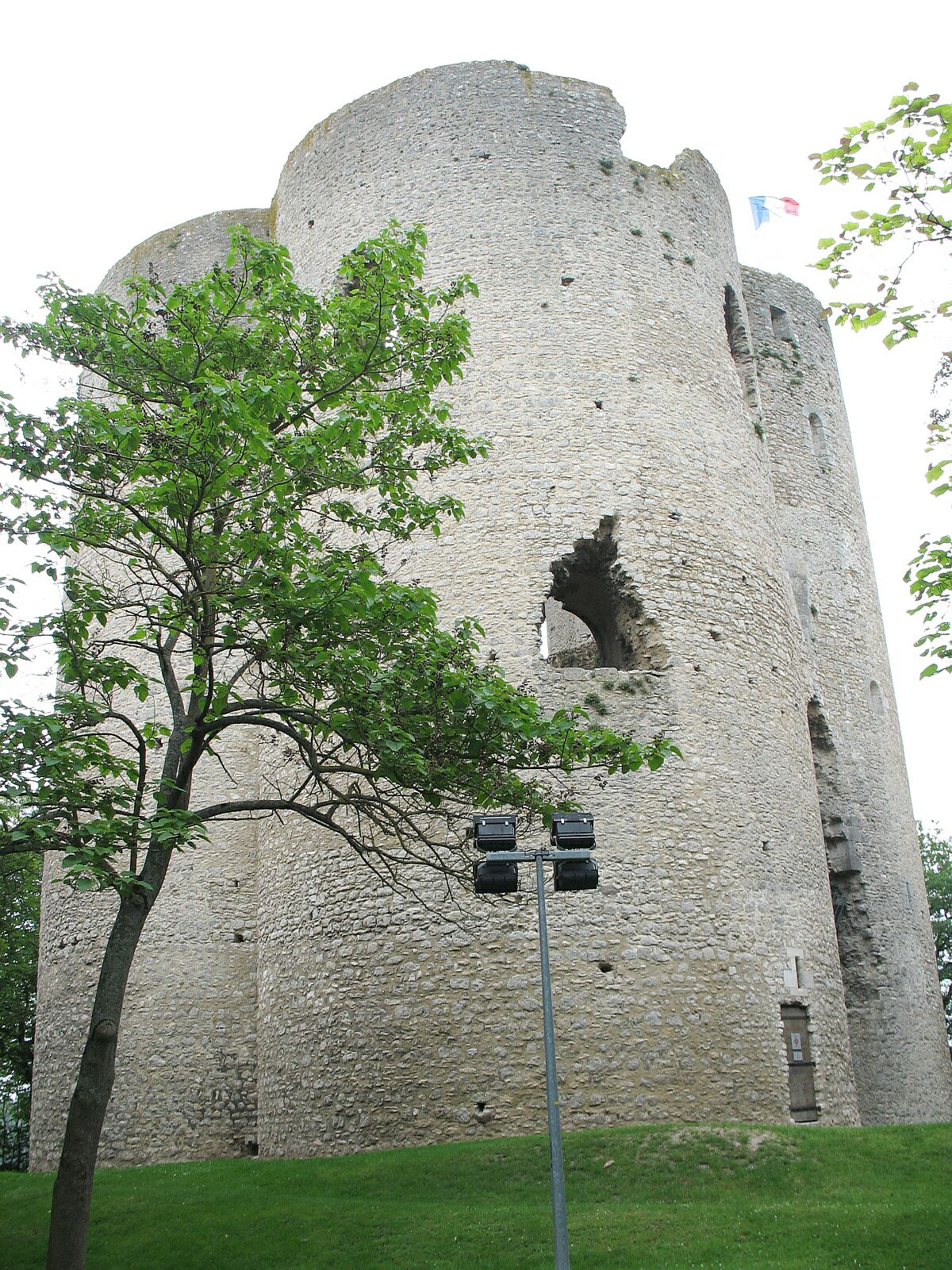
- The Tour de Guinette

- Location within Île-de-France (region)

General information
- Architectural style: Medieval
- Classification: Monument historique
- Location: Étampes, France
- Coordinates: 48°26′14″N 2°9′30″E
- Construction started: 11th century
- Completed: 1150
- Client: Robert II of France

The Château d'Étampes was a castle in the town of Étampes in the department of Essonne, France. The principal remains are of the 12th-century keep, the Tour de Guinette.

== History ==
The Château d'Étampes was an early 10th-century stronghold of Robert the Pious, King of France, that comprised both a palace proper and motte. Between 1130 and 1150, a new castle was created overlooking the valley, culminating in a strong keep or donjon: the present Tour de Guinette. The Château was extended under later kings, notably Philip II of France, but suffered through sieges in the Hundred Years War before having been ordered destroyed by Henry IV of France, after which only the keep remained.

== Description of the Château ==
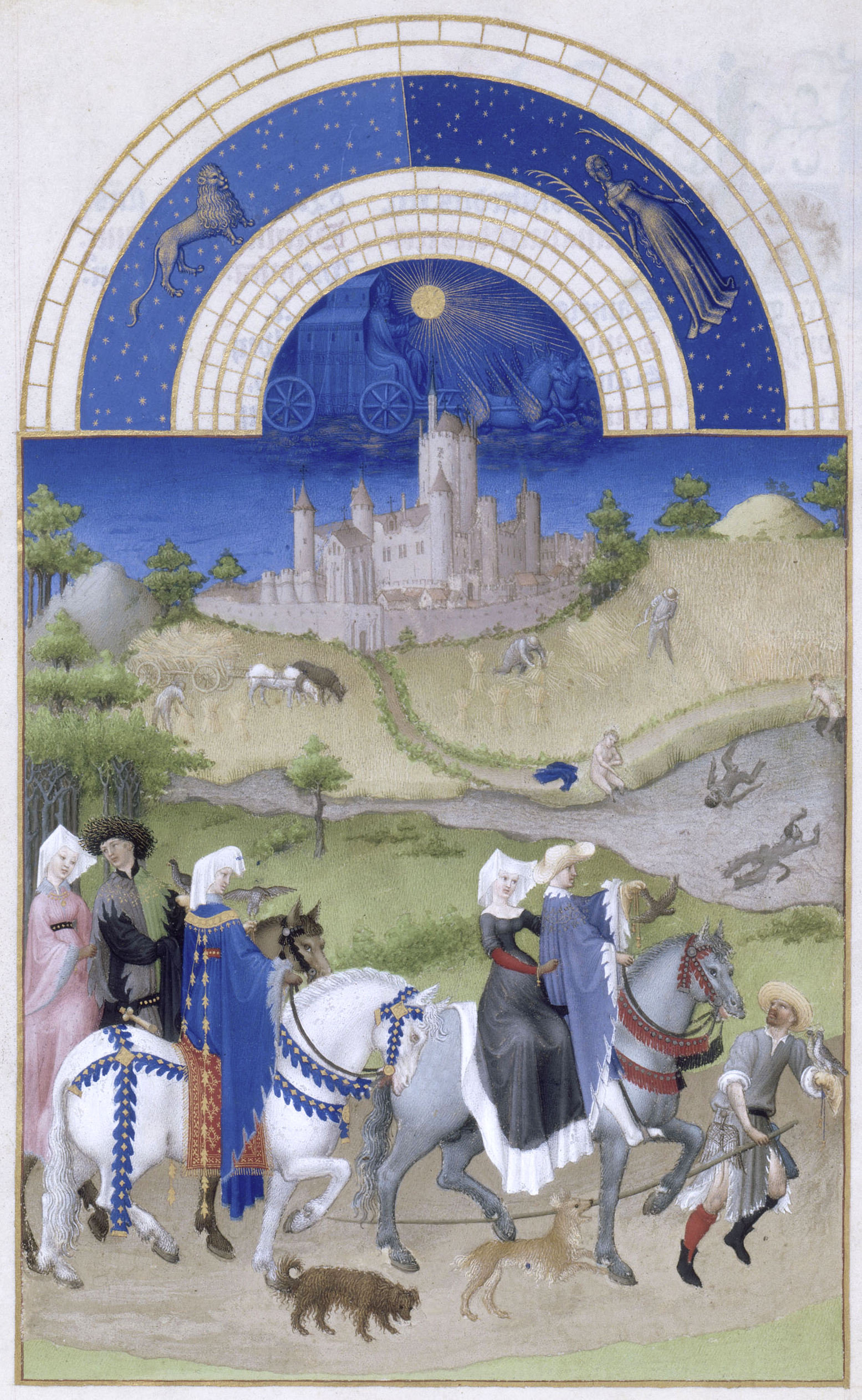
An illuminated page from the Très Riches Heures du duc de Berry, the month of August, featuring an image of the Château d'Étampes around 1400

The architectural aspects of this former royal castle are known from contemporary images, including the Très Riches Heures du duc de Berry. The Tour de Guinette was in the centre of the castle and was surrounded by a rectangular curtain wall, punctuated by corner towers. This wall was, in turn, enclosed by two additional walls, providing layers of defence for the keep.

The surviving keep stands roughly 27 metres tall and is a quatrefoil plan (much like a four-leaf clover). Divided into four stories, first-floor access may originally have been reached from the enclosure wall. This interesting plan is the result of tactical experimentation that the keep underwent during the mid-12th century to improve the defence of towers against missiles and to reduce dead ground. The circular lobes deflect missiles, and allow defenders to cover the foot of the walls from the summit of the keep. The plan resembles the keeps of Ambleny and nearby Houdan. Clifford's Tower, part of York Castle in York, England, is believed to have been inspired by Étampes.

== See also ==
- List of castles in France
