= Tourism in Paris =

Tourists being photographed with the Eiffel Tower

Tourism in Paris is a major income source. Paris received 12.6 million visitors in 2020, measured by hotel stays, a drop of 73 percent from 2019, due to the COVID-19 pandemic. The number of foreign visitors declined by 80.7 percent. Museums re-opened in 2021, with limitations on the number of visitors at a time and a requirement that visitors wear masks.

In 2018, 17.95 million international, overnighting tourists visited the city, mainly for sightseeing and shopping (and estimated to be well over double if including domestic overnighting visitors). Top sights include Notre Dame (12 million visitors in 2017), Disneyland Paris (11), Sacre Cœur (10), the Versailles Palace (7.7), the Louvre Museum (6.9), the Eiffel Tower (5.9), Centre Pompidou (3.33), and the Musée d'Orsay (3 million). The largest numbers of foreign tourists who come to the Paris region are British, American, German, Italian, Chinese, Indian and Canadian.

In 2012, 263,212 salaried workers in Paris, or 18.4 percent of the total number of workers, were engaged in tourism-related sectors; hotels, catering, transport, and leisure. In 2014 visitors to Paris spent 17 billion dollars (13.58 billion Euros), the third highest sum globally after London and New York.

== Tourist attractions ==
=== The Eiffel Tower (La Tour Eiffel) ===
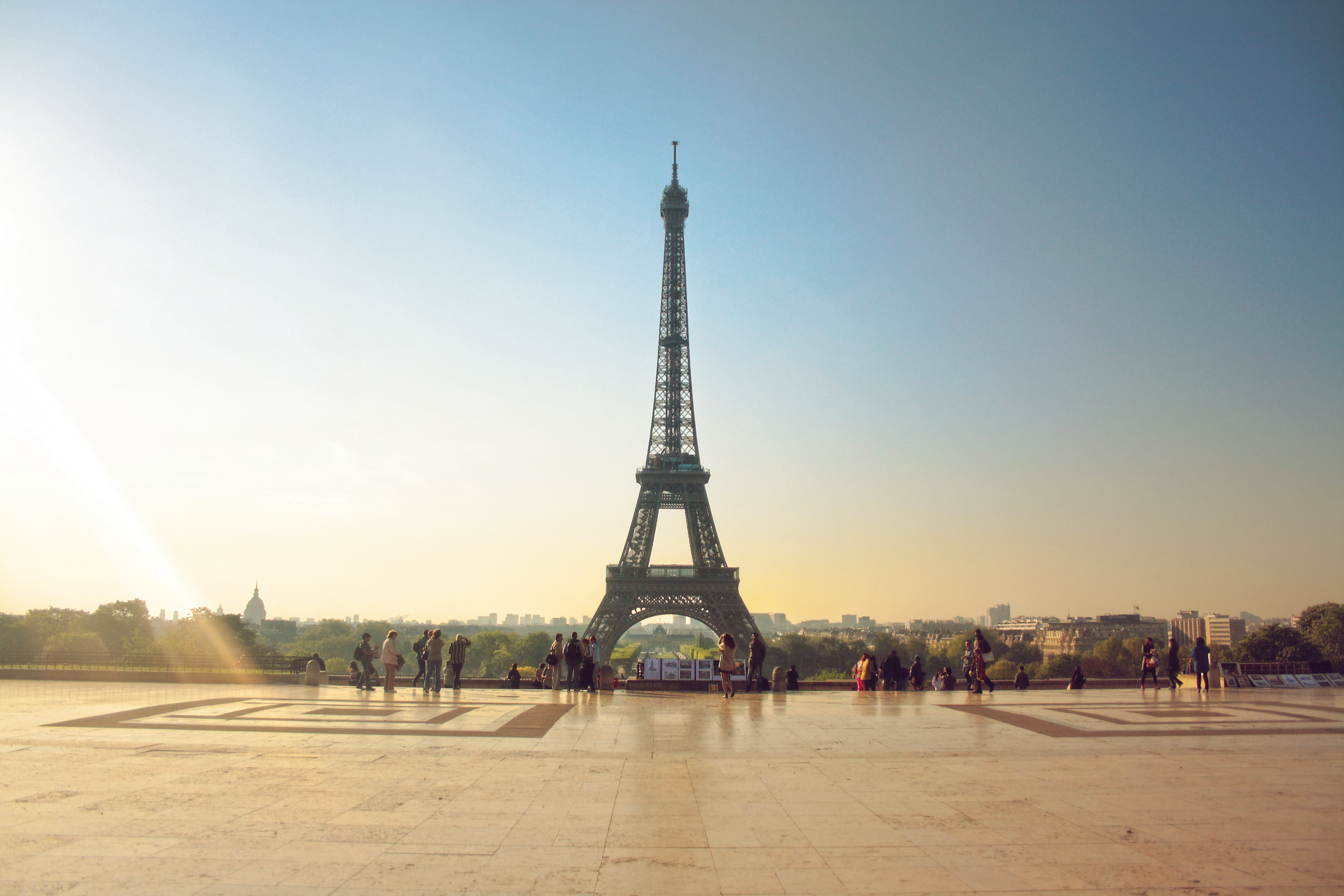
The Eiffel Tower from the Place du Trocadéro

The Eiffel Tower is acknowledged as the universal symbol of both Paris and France. It was originally designed by Émile Nouguier and Maurice Koechlin. In March 1885, Gustave Eiffel, known primarily as a successful iron engineer, submitted a plan for a tower to the French Ministre du Commerce et de l'Industrie. He entered a competition for students studying at the university. The winning proposal would stand as the centerpiece of the 1889 Exposition. Eiffel's was one of over 100 submissions. Eiffel's proposal was finally chosen in June 1886. Even before its construction, the Tower's uniqueness was noticed. The Eiffel Tower was finally inaugurated on March 31, 1889. Currently, about 6.9 million people visit the Eiffel Tower each year.

=== Centre Georges Pompidou ===
Centre Georges Pompidou was officially opened on January 31, 1977, by President Valéry Giscard d'Estaing. The designers of Pompidou are Renzo Piano, Richard Rogers, and Peter Rice. The Centre Pompidou has had over 150 million visitors since 1977. Centre Georges Pompidou is a complex in the Beaubourg area of the 4th arrondissement of Paris, near Les Halles, rue Montorgueil and the Marais. In 1997 renovations had begun to drastically change the interior spaces of the Centre Pompidou. The renovations were still preserving the celebrated and original tubular design The internal refurbishment was mainly done to enable the building to deal with the pressure of increasing visitor numbers. The renovation also developed the centre's capacity to host the performing arts and increased the display area of the Museum of Modern Art.

=== Arc de Triomphe ===
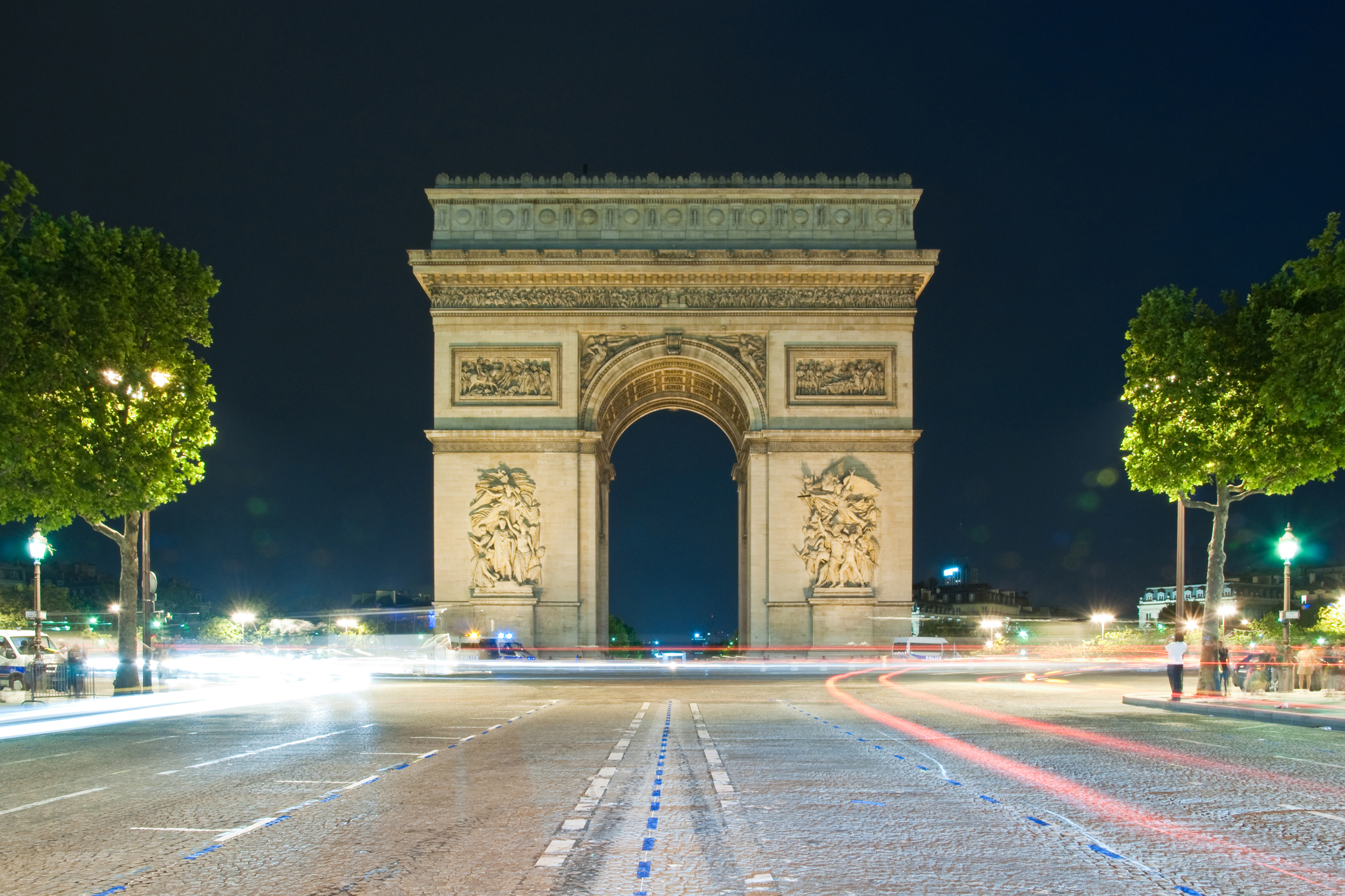
The Arc de Triomphe

The Arc de Triomphe de l'Étoile is one of the most famous monuments in Paris. It stands in the centre of the Place Charles de Gaulle (originally named Place de l'Étoile) at the western end of the Champs-Élysées. It should not be confused with a smaller arch, the Arc de Triomphe du Carrousel, which stands west of the Louvre. The Arc de Triomphe (in English: "Triumphal Arch") honours those who fought and died for France in the French Revolutionary and the Napoleonic Wars, with the names of all French victories and generals inscribed on its inner and outer surfaces. Beneath its vault lies the Tomb of the Unknown Soldier from World War I. The Arc de Triomphe is the linchpin of the Axe historique (in English: "historic axis") – a sequence of monuments and grand thoroughfares on a route which goes from the courtyard of the Louvre to the Grande Arche de la Défense.

=== Musée d'Orsay (Orsay Museum) ===
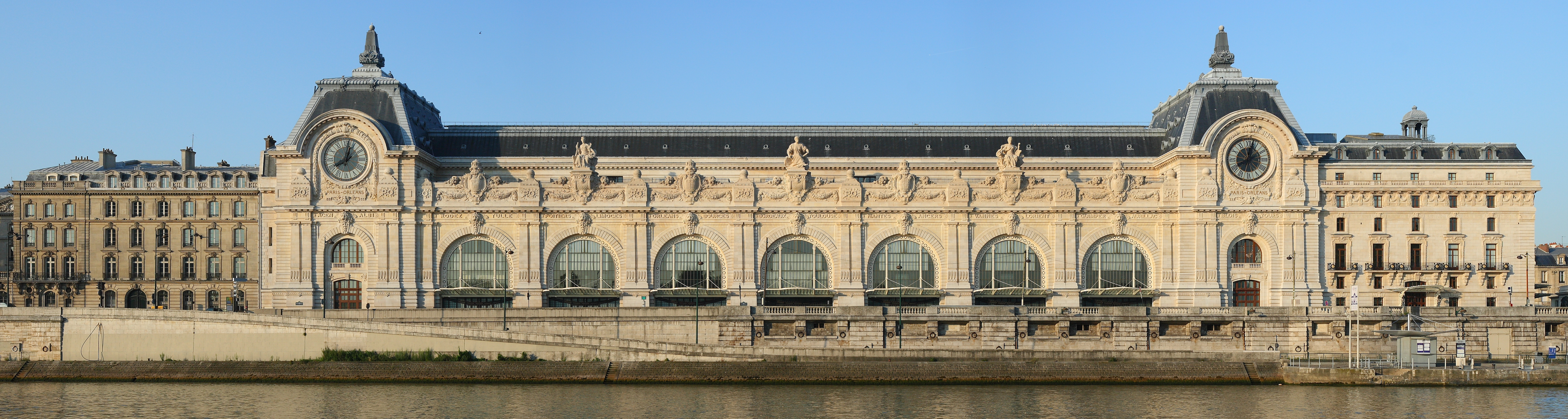
The Musée d'Orsay

The Musée d'Orsay is an art museum on the left bank of the Seine originally constructed as a train station in the late 1890s. It was designed by Gae Aulenti, Victor Laloux, and Émile Bernard. The Musée opened in 1986, and exhibits artworks from 1848 to 1914 with emphasis on French Impressionism.

Sections of the museum focus on Symbolism, Naturalism, Impressionism, Post-Impressionism, Pont Aven School, and Art Nouveau, to name a few. A culmination of nearly ten years of government commitment and dedicated teamwork, the museum presents some idea of what occurred in France between 1848 and 1914 in the fields of painting, drawing, sculpture, opera design, architecture, photography, metalwork, furniture, ceramics, and textiles.

=== Musée du Louvre (Louvre Museum) ===
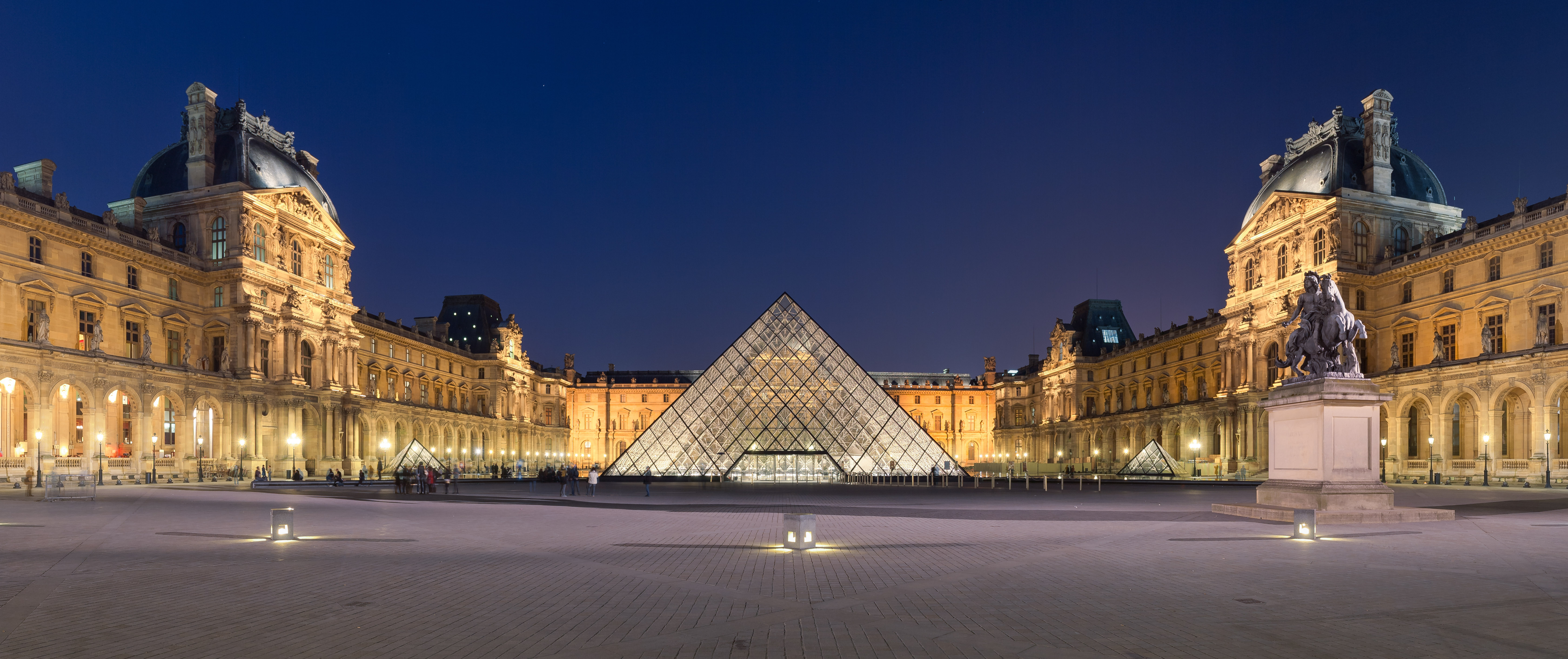
The Louvre Palace and the Louvre Pyramid

The Louvre Palace, originally built as a medieval fortress in the year 1190 by King Philippe Auguste, was transformed by successive governments. Since the French Revolution, it has hosted the Musée du Louvre, one of the largest museums of the western world. It houses some of the most popular and culturally ethnic form of art. The Louvre opened to the public on August 10, 1793. On March 3, 1989, I.M. Pei inaugurated his Glass Pyramid, which also serves as an official entrance to the main exhibition hall, which in turn leads to the temporary exhibition halls. The Musée is divided into three wings: Sully, Richelieu, and Denon, which showcase 35,000 pieces of art, much of it dating back to the Middle Ages. Some of the most renowned pieces of art in the Louvre are Leonardo da Vinci's Mona Lisa, Venus de Milo, the Winged Victory of Samothrace, Liberty Leading the People, and the Dying Slave by Michelangelo.

=== Notre-Dame de Paris ===
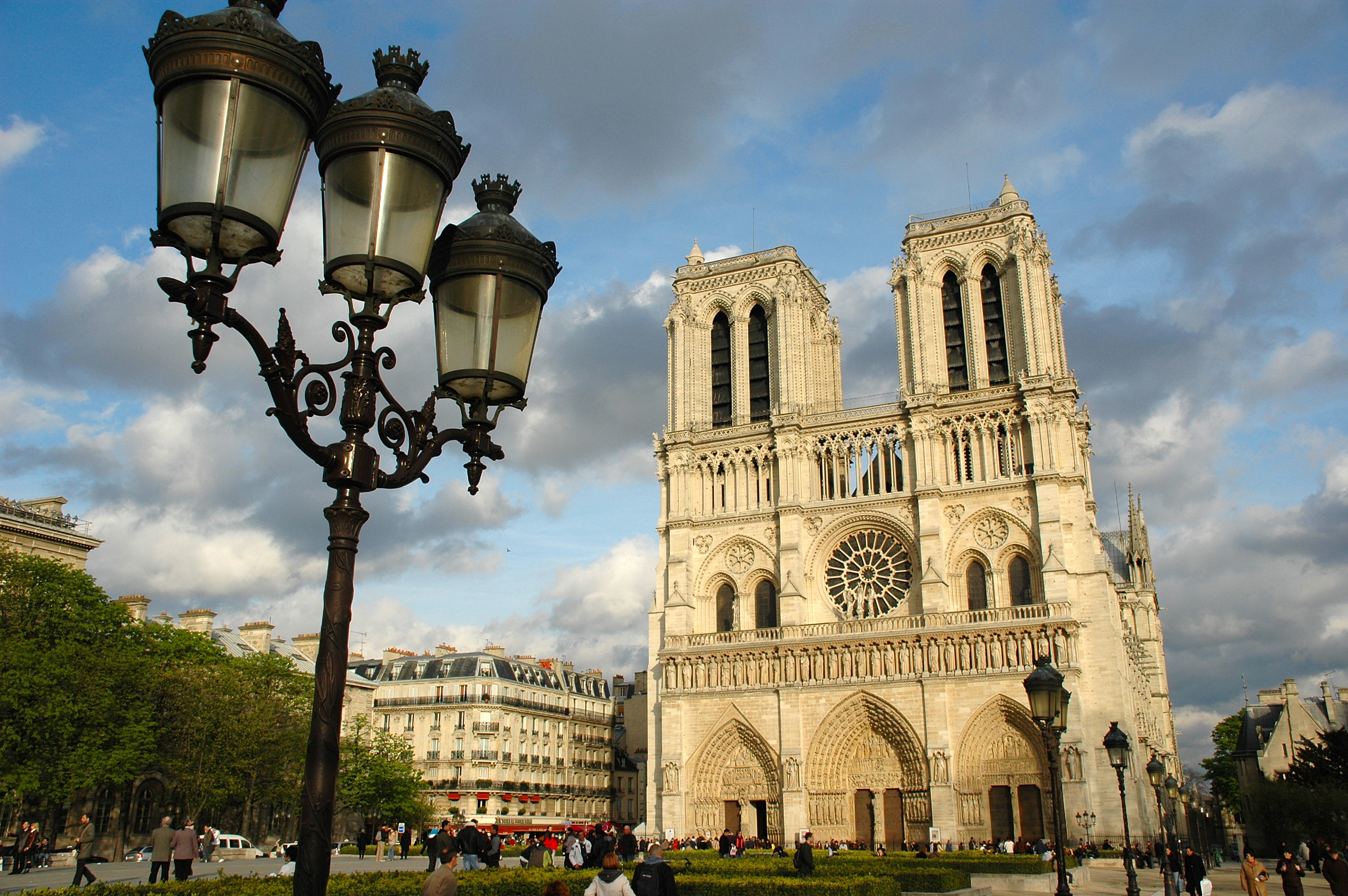
Notre-Dame de Paris

The Notre-Dame de Paris is the largest cathedral in Paris. Construction began in 1163 by Maurice de Sully, the then appointed bishop of Paris. The construction campaign was divided into 4 parts, and was done by well-known builders of that era: Jean de Chelles, Pierre de Montreuil, Pierre de Chelles, Jean Ravy, Jean le Bouteiller. It took over 100 years for the Notre-Dame to be built completely. It was built in honour of Virgin Mary, making it a bishop’s church, a canon church and a baptistery. It is one of the main symbols of Paris. It is located at Île de la Cité, a small island in the heart of the city. There have been several historical events that have taken place here, including the marriage of King Henry IV and Marguerite de Valois, in 1594 and Napoleon I coronation in 1804.

On April 15, 2019, most of Notre Dame's roof was destroyed in a fire and a few historic artifacts were lost. Repairs and reconstruction are ongoing.

=== Basilique du Sacré-Cœur ===
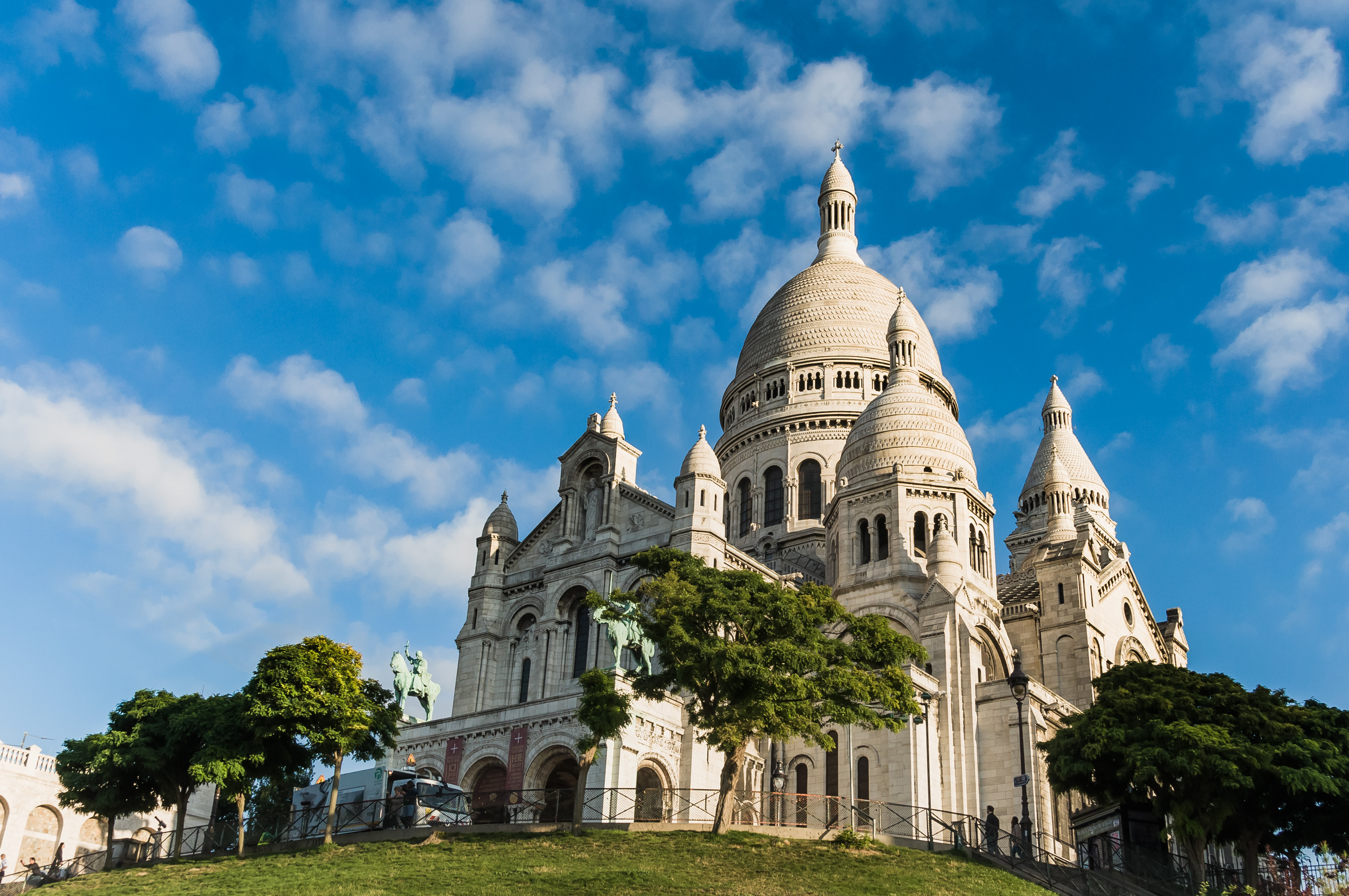
The Sacré-Cœur

The Basilique du Sacré-Cœur is a Roman Catholic Basilica that was built in 1914 and consecrated in 1919. It is located at the highest altitude in Paris, at butte Montmartre, itself a historically important artist colony. The church contains one of the world's largest mosaic of Jesus Christ, with his arms wide spread. The basilica was built in the honour of the 58,000 lives lost in the Franco-Prussian war in the year 1870. Paul Abadie, the winner of the competition to find the right architectural design, was the architect for the basilica. The basilica offers some beautiful panoramic views of Paris. The walls of the church are naturally always white and clean, due to the travertine stone used in its construction. The stone reacts with water and creates a chemical called calcite, which acts as a natural bleacher.

=== The Musée du Quai Branly ===
The Musée du quai Branly features indigenous art, cultures and civilizations from Africa, Asia, Oceania, and the Americas. The museum is located at 37 Quai Jacques Chirac, close to the Eiffel Tower. The nearest métro and RER stations are Alma – Marceau and Pont de l'Alma, respectively. MQB is named after its location on the quai Branly, which in turn is named after the physicist Édouard Branly.

=== The Champs-Élysées ===
The Avenue des Champs-Élysées is a street with cinemas, cafés, luxury specialty shops and clipped horse-chestnut trees. Around 7 million people visit the Champs Élysées per year and around 19,180 people per day. The Champs-Élysées is arguably one of the world's most famous streets, and is one of the most expensive strips of real estate in the world. Several French monuments are also on the street, including the Arc de Triomphe and the Place de la Concorde. The name is French for Elysian Fields, the place of the blessed dead in Greek mythology. According to a much used description, the Champs-Élysées is la plus belle avenue du monde ("the most beautiful avenue in the world").

=== Les Invalides ===
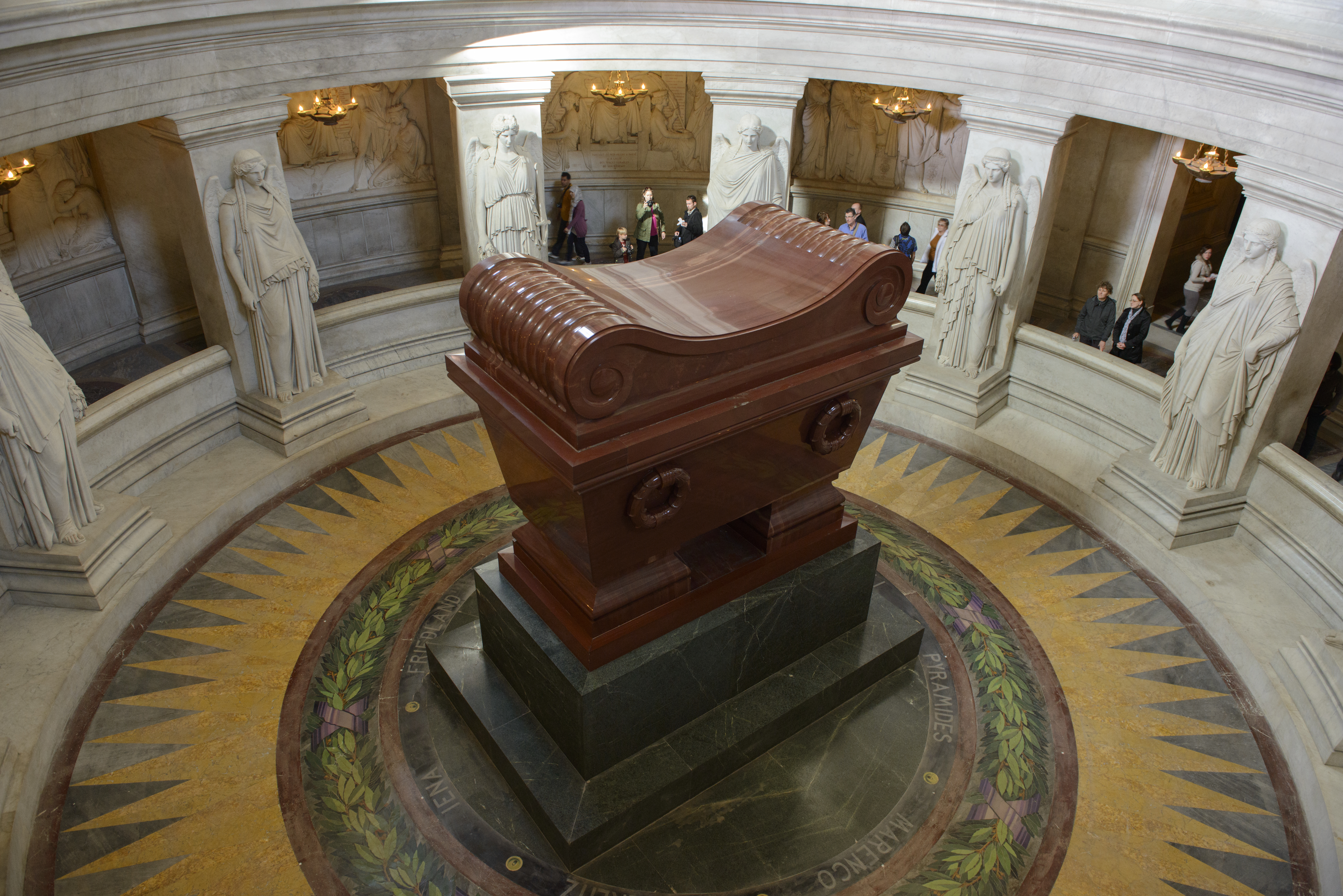
Napoleon's tomb in Les Invalides

Les Invalides, officially known as "L'Hôtel national des Invalides" (The National Residence of the Invalids), is a complex of buildings in the 7th arrondissement, containing museums and monuments, all relating to the military history of France, as well as a hospital and a retirement home for war veterans, the building's original purpose. The buildings house the Musée de l'Armée, the military museum of the Army of France, the Musée des Plans-Reliefs, and the Musée d'Histoire Contemporaine, as well as the burial site for some of France's war heroes, notably Napoleon.

=== The Sainte Chapelle ===
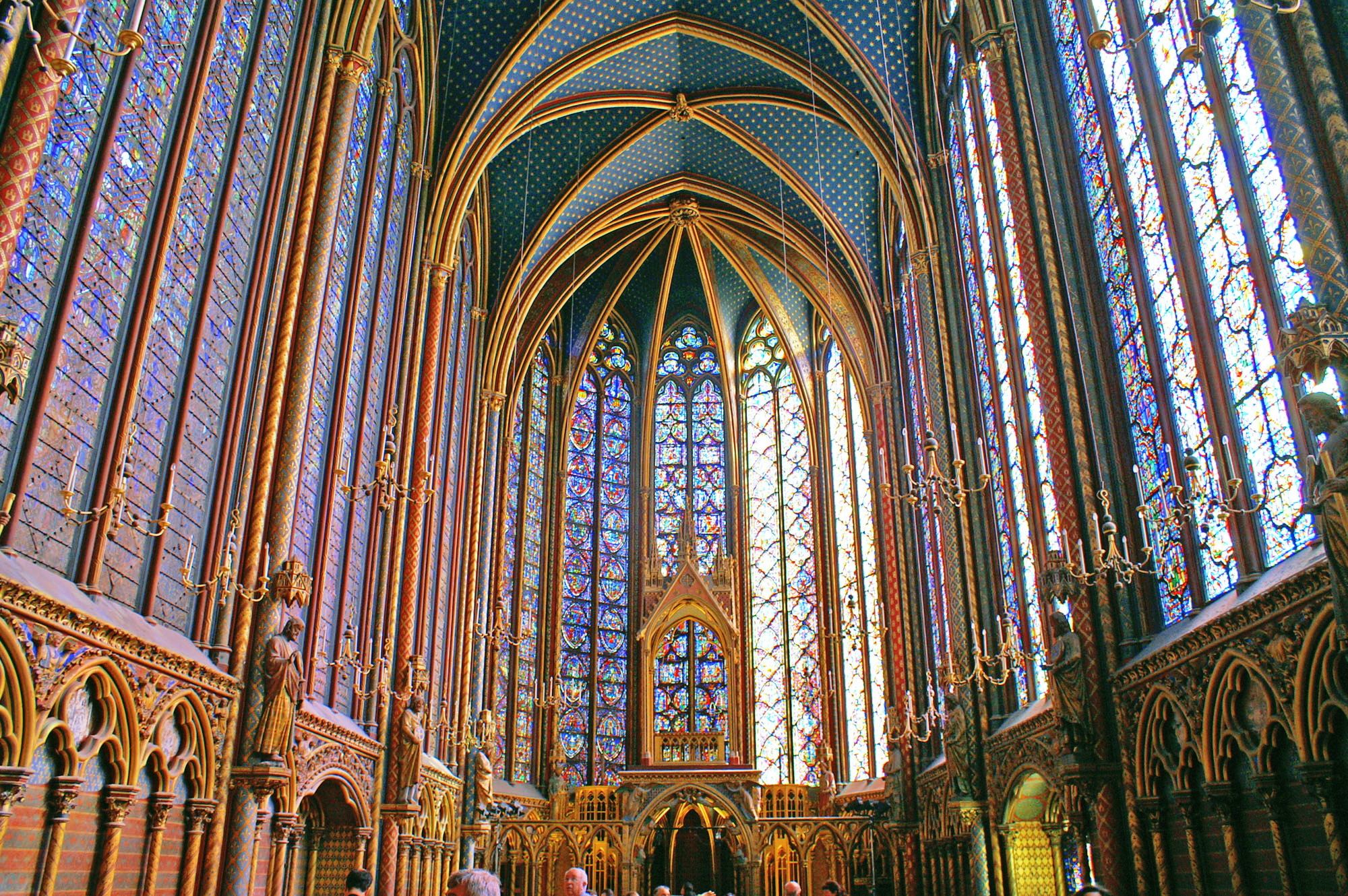
Saint Louis' Sainte Chapelle

The Sainte-Chapelle is a royal medieval Gothic chapel, located near the Palais de la Cité, on the Île de la Cité. Begun some time after 1239 and consecrated on 26 April 1248, the Sainte-Chapelle is considered among the highest achievements of the Rayonnant period of Gothic architecture. Its erection was commissioned by King Louis IX of France to house his collection of Passion Relics, including Christ's Crown of Thorns - one of the most important relics in medieval Christendom. Along with the Conciergerie, the Sainte-Chapelle is one of the earliest surviving buildings of the Capetian royal palace on the Île de la Cité. Although damaged during the French revolution, and restored in the 19th century, it retains one of the most extensive in-situ collections of 13th-century stained glass anywhere in the world.

=== Disneyland Paris ===
Disneyland Paris

Disneyland Paris (formerly Euro Disneyland) is an amusement park in the Paris region. It is the most popular amusement park in Europe in terms of attendance records.

=== Cité des Sciences et de l'Industrie ===
The Cité des Sciences et de l'Industrie is the biggest science museum in Europe. Located in Parc de la Villette, it is at the heart of the Cultural Center of Science, Technology and Industry, a center promoting science and science culture. About five million people visit the Cité each year. Attractions include a planetarium, a submarine (the Argonaute (S636)), an IMAX theatre (La Géode) and special areas for children and teenagers. The Cité is classified as a public establishment of an industrial and commercial character, an establishment specializing in the fostering of scientific and technical culture. Created on the initiative of President Giscard d'Estaing, the goal of the Cité is to spread scientific and technical knowledge among the public, particularly for youth, and to promote public interest in science, research and industry. The most notable features of the "bioclimatic façade" facing the park are Les Serres - three greenhouse spaces each 32 metres high, 32 metres wide and 8 metres deep. The façades of Les Serres were the first structural glass walls to be constructed without framing or supporting fins. Between 30 May and 1 June 2008, the museum hosted the 3rd International Salon for Peace Initiatives.

== List of visitors per attraction ==
The 20 top Paris museums and monuments - (2007/2006 figures from the Paris Office of Tourism)

Rank	Change 07/06	Museums and monuments	2007	2006	Variation 07/06
1	=	Notre Dame de Paris	13,650,000	13,650,000	—
2	=	Basilique du Sacré-Cœur	10,500,000	10,500,000	—
3	=	The Louvre	8,260,000	8,348,000	-1.1%
4	=	Eiffel Tower	6,797,410	6,695,135	1.5%
5	=	Pompidou Centre	5,509,425	5,133,506	7.3%
6	+1	Musée d'Orsay	3,166,509	3,009,203	5.2%
7	-1	Cité des Sciences et de l'Industrie	3,030,628	3,055,000	-0.8%
8	=	Chapel of Our Lady of the Miraculous Medal	2,000,000	2,000,000	—
9	+1	Arc de Triomphe	1,543,295	1,330,738	16.0%
10	+2	Musée du Quai Branly	1,379,623	952,770	44.8%
11	-2	Muséum d'Histoire Naturelle	1,372,804	1,344,344	2.1%
12	-1	Musée de l'Armée	1,188,728	1,130,841	5.1%
13	=	Sainte Chapelle	866,982	833,392	4.0%
14	+3	Musée Grévin	762,000	682,000	11.7%
15	-1	Institut du Monde Arabe	724,805	822,285	-11.9%
16	+3	Musée Rodin	700,001	621,513	12.6%
17	+7	Musée de l'Orangerie	598,762	447,093	33.9%
18	-3	Petit Palais	576,339	787,418	-26.8%
19	+3	Tour Montparnasse	554,372	458,000	21.0%
20	+3	Panthéon	507,452	454,999	11.5%

== Tourism tax ==
Like other world cities, Paris charges a hotel tax. It ranges from €0,65 to €14,95 per person, per night, based on the hotel or other type of accommodation used.

== See also ==
- List of museums in Paris
- Landmarks in Paris
- List of châteaux in the Île-de-France
- List of castles in the Île-de-France
- Tourism in France
- Panel Histoire de Paris
