= List of castles in the Île-de-France =

This list of castles in the Île-de-France is a list of medieval castles or château forts in the region in northern France.

Links in italics are links to articles in the French Wikipedia.

== Essonne ==
Name	Date	Condition	Image	Ownership / Access	Notes
Château de Dourdan	c.1220	Substantially intact		Museum	Keep isolated by dry moat from rest of castle, used as prison until 1852.
Château d'Étampes	12th century	Ruins			Keep survives, known as the Tour de Guinette.
Château de Montlhéry	13th century	Ruins			Keep survives substantially intact.

== Hauts-de-Seine ==
Castles of which little or nothing remains include Château La Boursidière.

== Paris ==
Castles of which little or nothing remains include The Bastille, The Louvre, The Temple and Château de la Tournelle.

Name	Date	Condition	Image	Ownership / Access	Notes
The Bastille	c. 1370-1789	Few relics survive			Due to its destruction after 1789, very little remains of the Bastille in the 21st century.
La Conciergerie	13-14th century	Fragment			Three towers survive from the medieval Conciergerie: the Caesar Tower, the Silver Tower and the Bonbec ("good beak") Tower.
The Louvre	c. 12th century	Few relics survive	Louvre - Les Très Riches Heures		Due to its continual alteration, very little remains of the fortress.
The Temple	c. 13th century	Few relics survive	Tour du Temple circa 1795 Ecole Francaise 18th century		Due to its destruction after 1800s, very little remains.
Château de la Tournelle	c. 12th century	Few relics survive	Chateau de la Tournelle		

== Seine-et-Marne ==
Name	Date	Condition	Image	Ownership / Access	Notes
Château de Blandy-les-Tours	14-16th century	Restored			Rebuilt 16th century, dismantled and transformed into farm 18th century.
Château de Brie-Comte-Robert	12-15th century	Ruins		Commune	
Château de la Grange-Bléneau	14-15th century	Intact		Josée and René de Chambrun Foundation	Altered 17th century, home of Gilbert du Motier, marquis de La Fayette 1802-34, unchanged since.
Château du Houssoy	14-15th century	Ruins			
Château de Moret	12th century				
Château de Montaiguillon	12th century	Ruins			
Château de Nangis	13-15th century	Rebuilt		Hôtel de ville	
Château de Nemours	12-14th century	Intact		Museum	
Tour César (Provins)	12-14th century	Intact		Commune	
Château de Sigy	14th century	Rebuilt			Altered 15th, 17th and 18th centuries.

== Seine-Saint-Denis ==
-

== Val-de-Marne ==
Name	Date	Condition	Image	Ownership / Access	Notes
Vincennes	12-14th century	Restored			Royal castle, keep 170 ft (52 m) high, Henry V of England died there in 1422, military HQ in 1940.

== Val-d'Oise ==
Name	Date	Condition	Image	Ownership / Access	Notes
Château de Beaumont-sur-Oise	12-14th century	Ruins			
Château de La Roche-Guyon	12th century	Ruins			

== Yvelines ==
Name	Date	Condition	Image	Ownership / Access	Notes
Château de Beynes	11-14th century	Ruins		Commune of Beynes	Abandoned 18th century.
Donjon de Houdan	1120-1137	Ruins			Keep survives.
Château de La Madeleine (Chevreuse)	12-15th century	Substantially intact			
Donjon de Maurepas		Ruins			
Château de Montfort		Ruins			
Château de Villiers-le-Mahieu	13th and 17th centuries	Restored from mid 20th century		Hotel	

== See also ==
- List of castles in France
- List of châteaux in France
