= Pierre de Chelles =

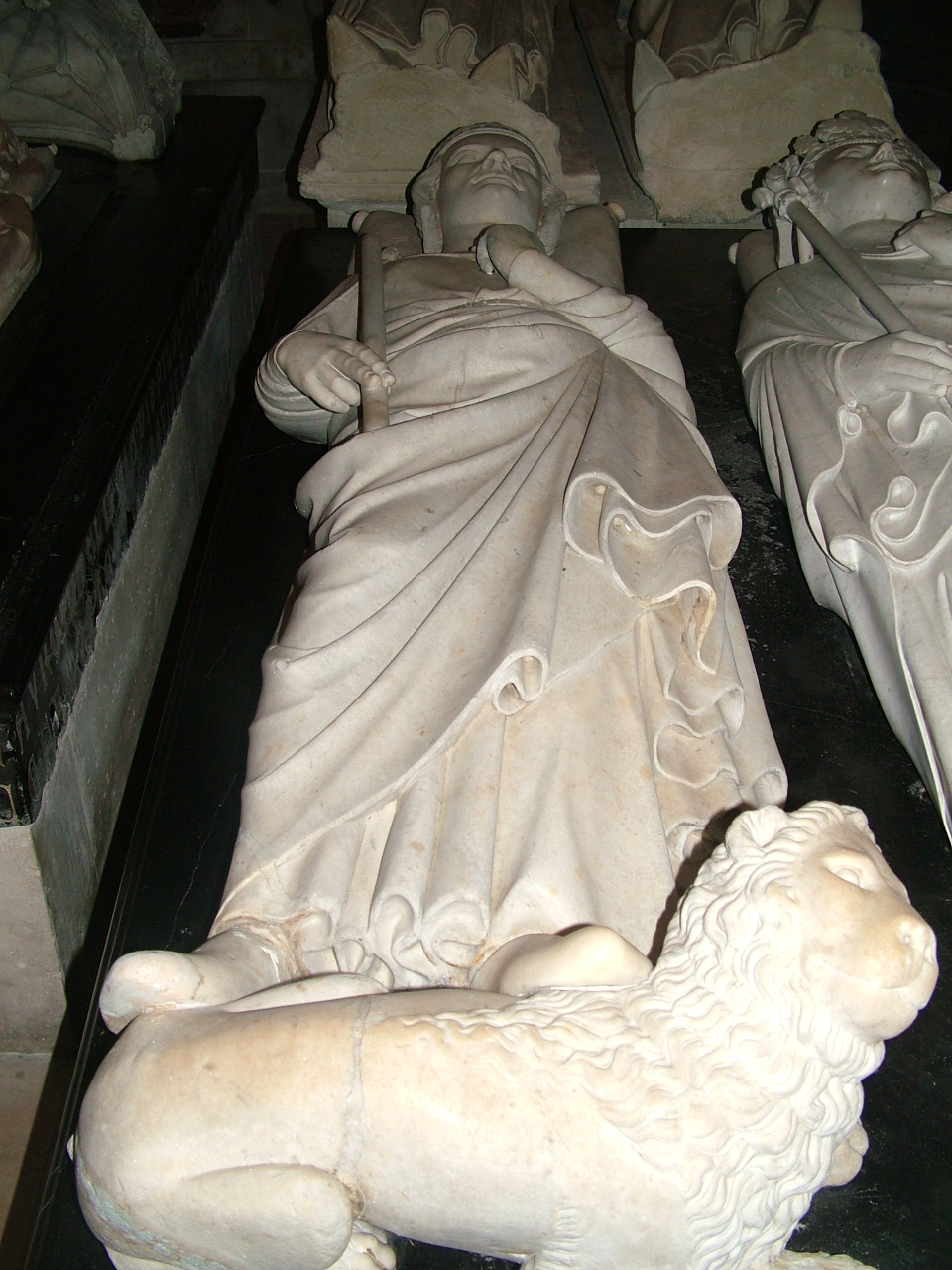
Tomb effigy of Philippe III at Saint-Denis

Pierre de Chelles (French pronunciation: [pjɛʁ də ʃɛl]) was a French architect from the late 13th and early 14th centuries. He was one of the architects of the Notre-Dame de Paris Cathedral. He completed the choir began in 1300, the high flying buttresses above the apse, and the building of the rood screen. He was also a sculptor.

De Chelles was related to Jean de Chelles, who was his father or uncle.

== Work ==
Pierre de Chelles was also the author of the tomb effigy of Philip III of France (1245–1285).
