= Château de Beynes =

Ruined castle in France

Coordinates: 48°51′23″N 1°52′28″E

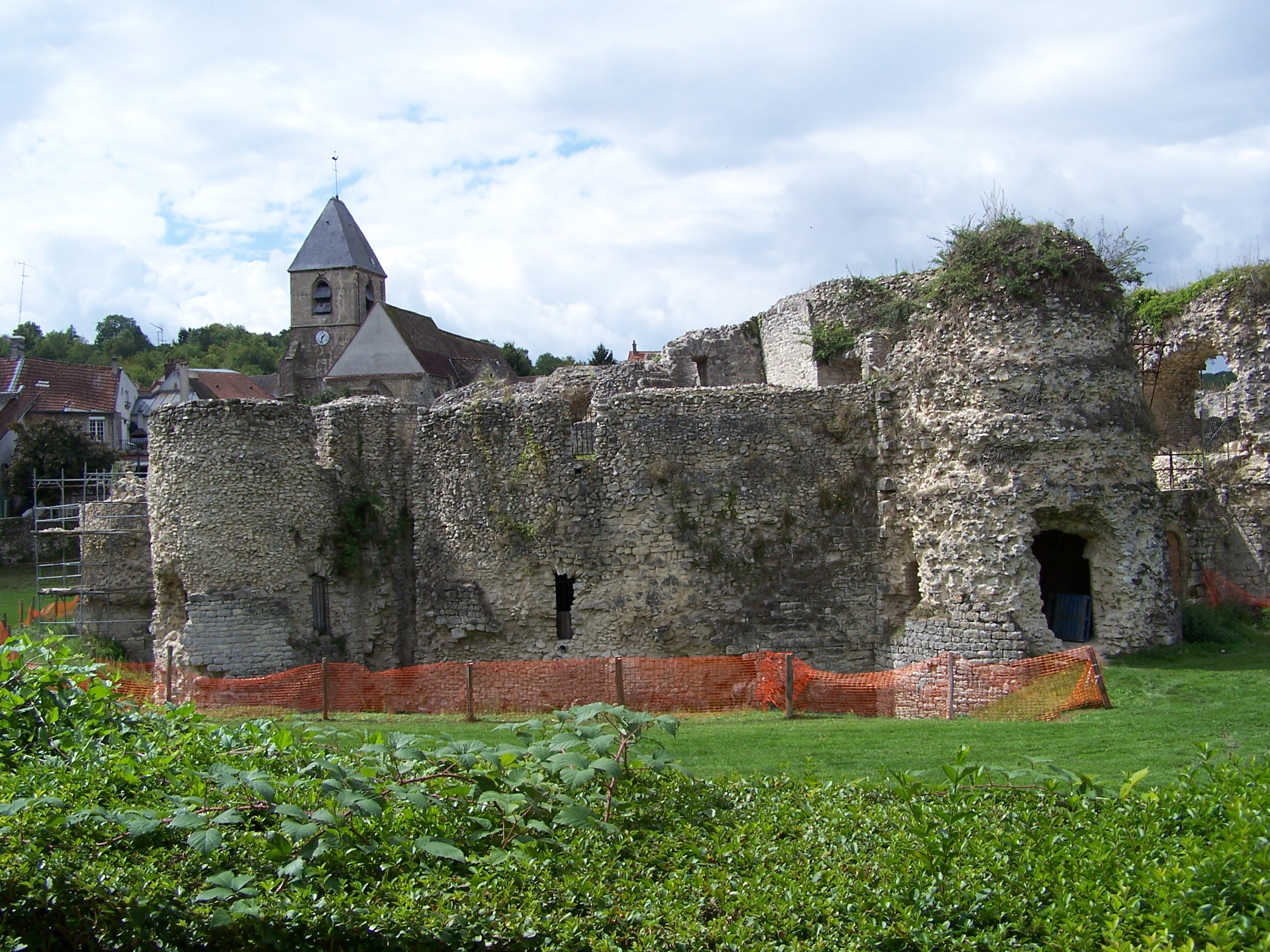
The Château de Beynes

The Château de Beynes is a ruined castle in the commune of Beynes in the Yvelines département of France.

== History ==
The original structure was erected in 1073. Later works date from the 13th, 14th and 15th centuries.

The first castle, a motte-and-bailey, was built in the bottom of the valley of the Mauldre River, at a time when castles were usually built on high ground. It had a defensive role at that time, with the river as a western defence line of the French Royal domain, defending against Normandy and other possible combatants. It was owned by the English during the Hundred Years' War.

Later, the castle lost its defensive role after the extension of the Royal territories. Around 1450, Robert d'Estouteville transformed the castle into a more comfortable residence by dismantling the keep and adapting the fortifications to the incipient artillery.

Other transformations were performed during the 15th century, particularly under Philibert de l'Orme.

In 1536, the castle was given to Diane de Poitiers by Henri II.

The castle was totally abandoned during the 18th century, fell into ruins, and was used as a stone quarry for the village constructions.

== Architecture ==
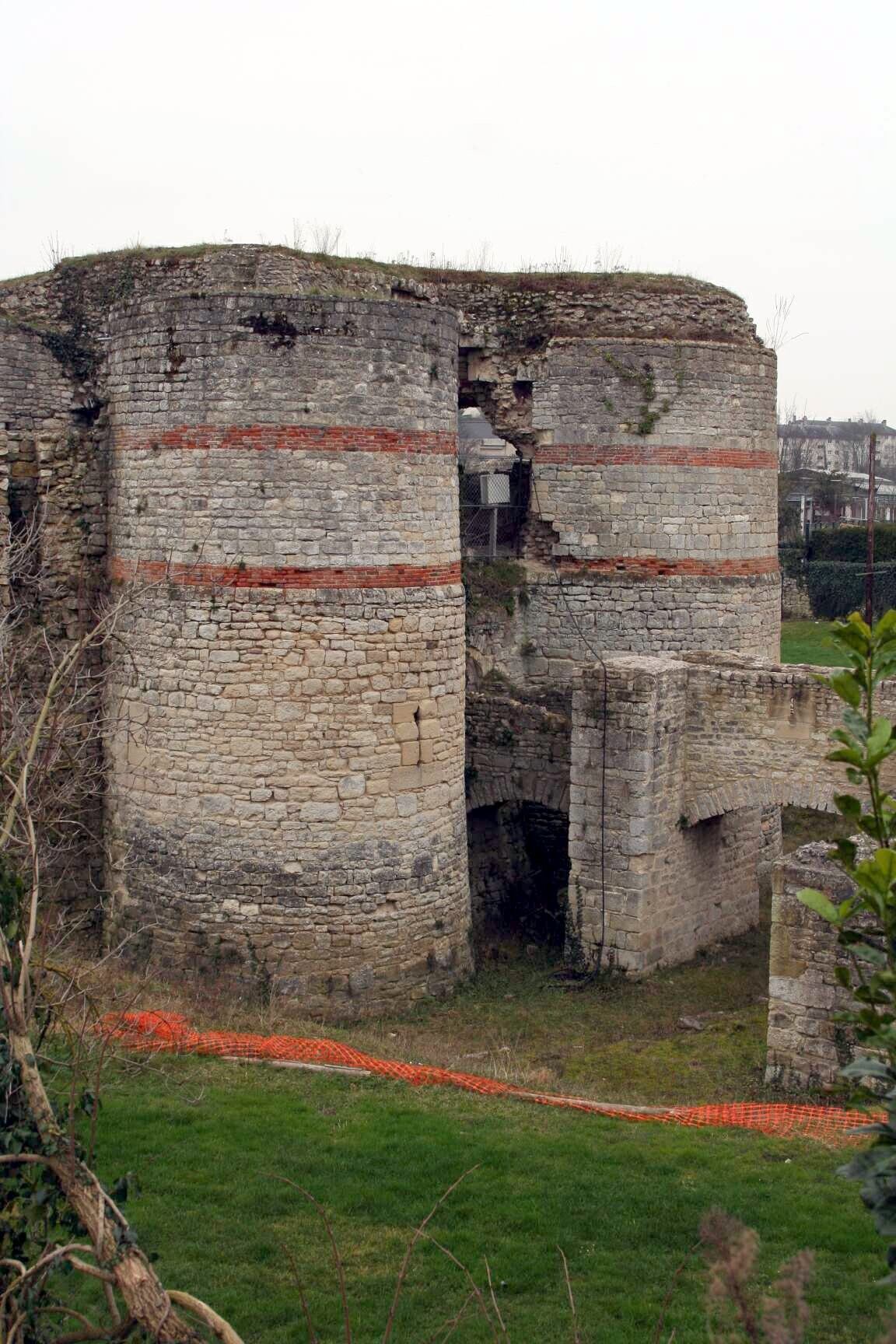
A stone bridge between the west châtelet and the barbican

The castle has an oval shape surrounded by a moat; nine towers stand along the curtain walls.

Since the transformations of the 15th century, a paved central courtyard crosses the castle. Two châtelets (east and west) defend the two entries to the castle, and a barbican also protects the west access.

== Modern days ==
The whole remains of the castle were listed as a Monument historique by the French Ministry of Culture in November 1959. The castle was bought by the commune in 1967, and from 1995 to 1999 excavations and consolidation works have stopped its deterioration. Presently, an active association is restoring the castle.

== See also ==
- List of castles in France
