= Jean de Chelles =

13th-century French artist

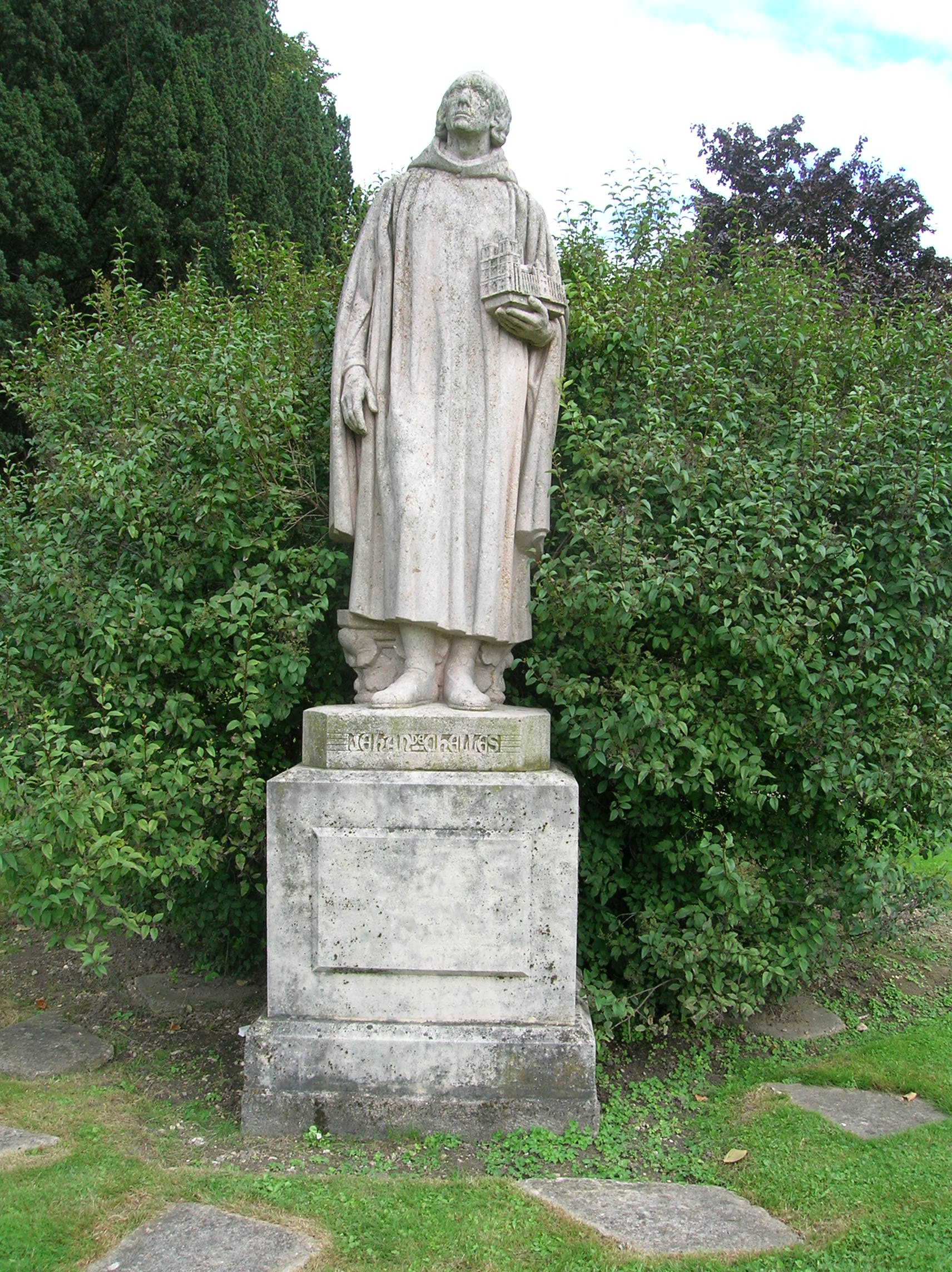
Statue of Jehan de Chelles, Parc du souvenir, Chelles (Seine-et-Marne)

Jean (or Jehan) de Chelles (French pronunciation: [ʒɑ̃ də ʃɛl]; working 1258–1265) was a master mason and sculptor who was one of the architects at the Cathedral of Notre-Dame de Paris. On the exterior wall of the south transept a stone plaque is signed Johanne Magistro and dated February 1257, documenting the initiation of alterations to the transept and its portal. On his death in 1265, he was succeeded by Master Pierre de Montreuil.

Jean de Chelles is credited with the south end of the transept of Nôtre Dame de Paris, the portal of the cloister and its rose window, and the portail Saint Etienne.

He is supposed to have worked with Pierre de Montreuil on the Cathedral of Saint Julien, Le Mans. A Jean de Chelles was working on the Palais du Louvre in 1265, under the direction of Raymond du Temple. He is sometimes thought to have worked on the Sainte-Chapelle in Paris, but the art historian, Robert Branner, believes this to have actually been created by Thomas Cormont, who had previously worked at Amiens.

The Pierre de Chelles, Maître de l'Œuvre de la cathédrale de Paris, who, with others, inspected the vaults and other work at Chartres Cathedral in an official capacity, 9 September 1316, may have been a son or nephew, succeeding him at Notre-Dame de Paris.
