= Château de Beaumont-sur-Oise =

Ruined medieval castle in France

Coordinates: 49°8′38″N 2°17′11″E

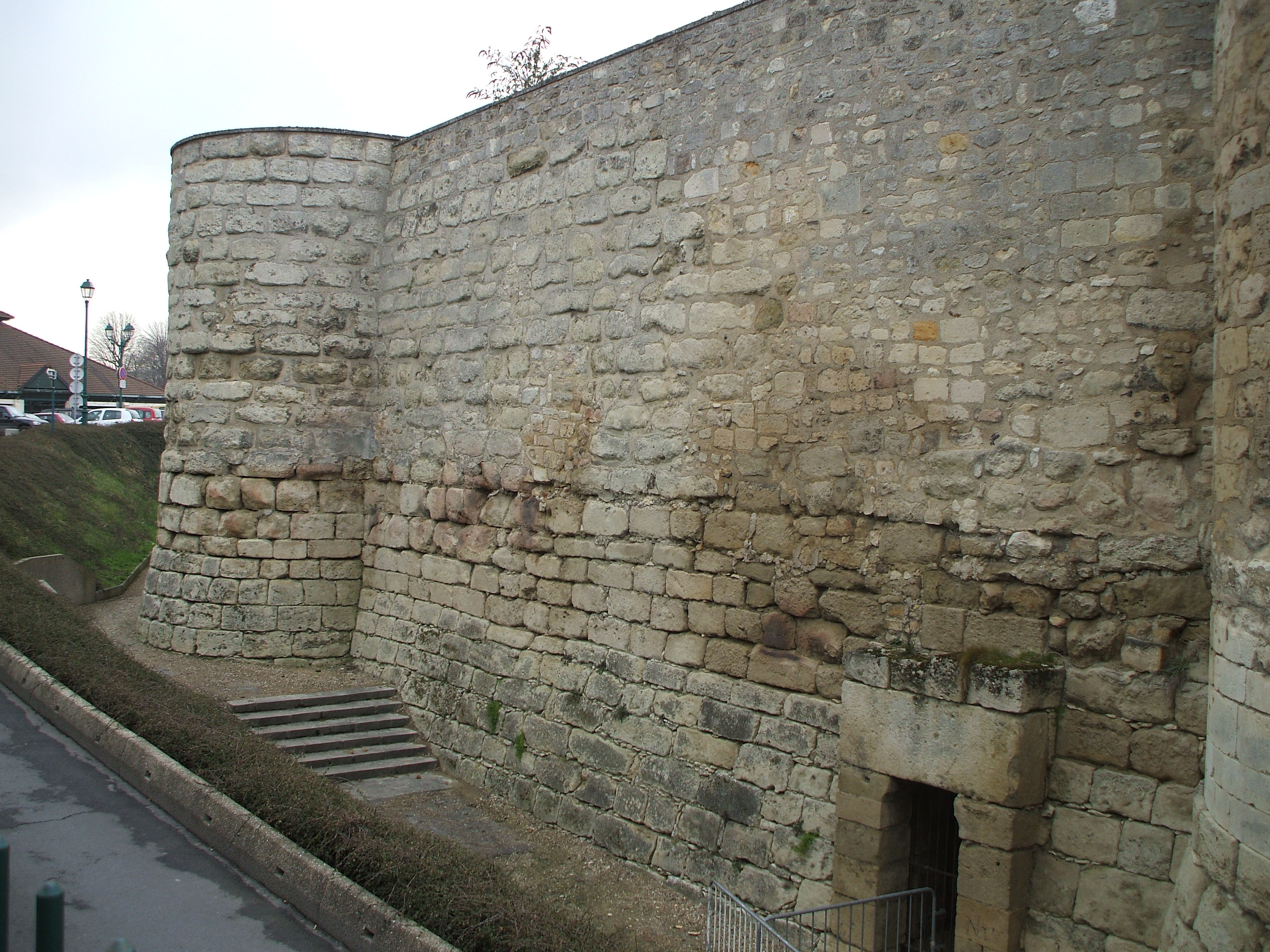
Castle wall

The Château de Beaumont-sur-Oise is a ruined medieval castle in the commune of Beaumont-sur-Oise in the Val-d'Oise département of France.

== History ==
This ancient castle is one of the most important in the valley of the Oise. It has a rectangular Romanesque keep with buttresses 25m high and 5m wide. It was probably built by the count Mathieu (1090-1151) to replace a preceding timber structure of the castrum type which had existed from the 3rd century on this rocky outcrop. It was destroyed and rebuilt several times between the 10th and 17th centuries, and was no more than a ruin by the 19th.

The town was developed and built around the castle, with construction in the 10th century of the castle's collegiate church and of a parish church.

In 1226, Louis XI became Count of Beaumont and lived in the castle.

The Hundred Years' War and the Wars of Religion were the reason for construction of the upper part of the walls and the keep. The English occupied the town for forty years and the castle itself between 1420 and 1435, when the French artillery of Henri IV caused major damage to the towers of the fortress.

At the time of the French Revolution, the castle was destroyed and then sold off as a national asset.

In May and June 1590, during the siege of Paris during the Wars of Religion, the castle and the village were besieged by the Huguenots. After about a month of resistance, Jean de Poutrincourt, defender of the castle, was forced to surrender.

== Today ==
The walls were cleared and restored in 1997.

Archaeological excavations carried out from 1984 have revealed the existence of an 11th-century monastery.

The castle is owned by the commune. It has been listed since 1992 as a monument historique by the French Ministry of Culture.

== Gallery ==
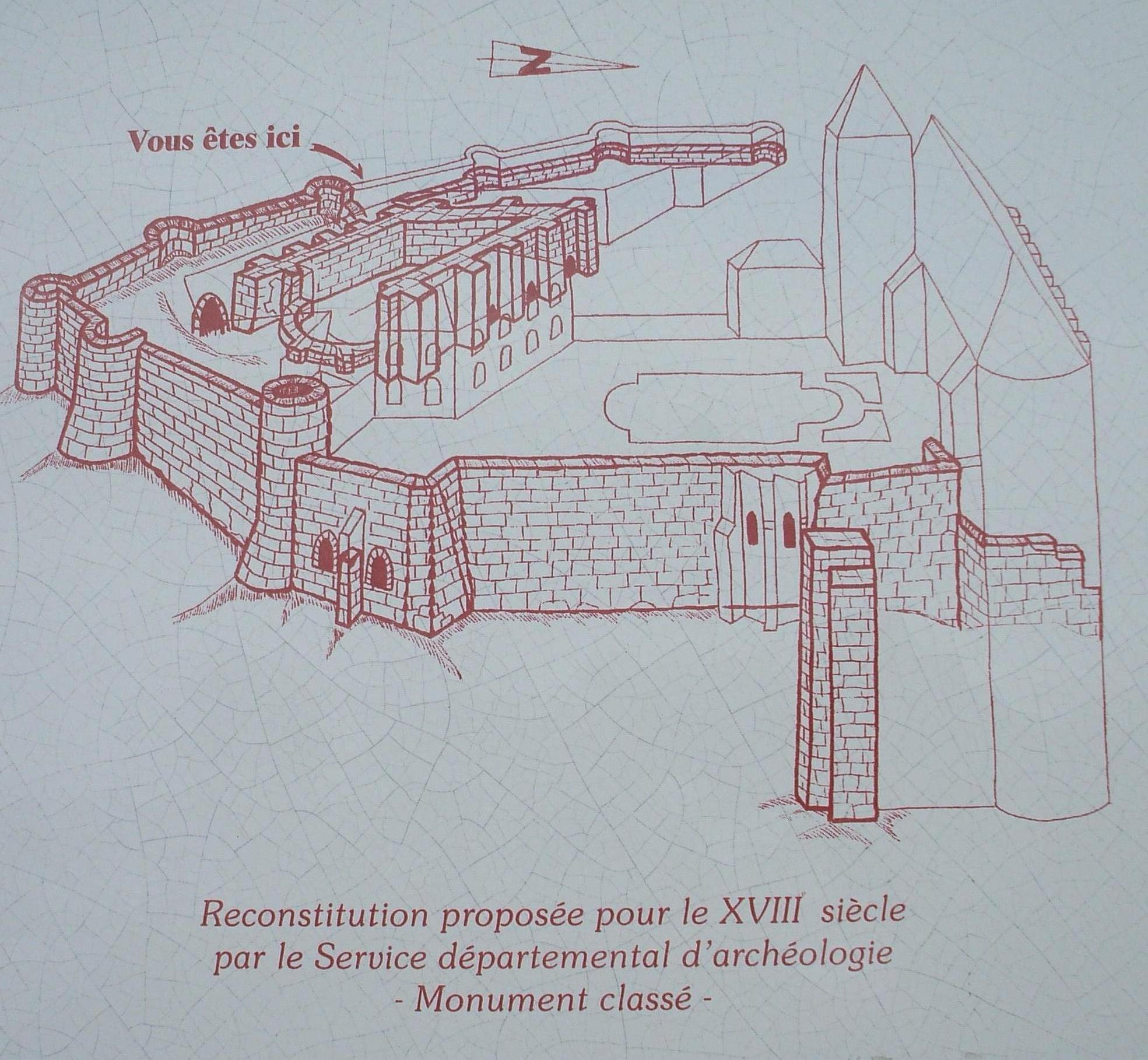
Plan of the site

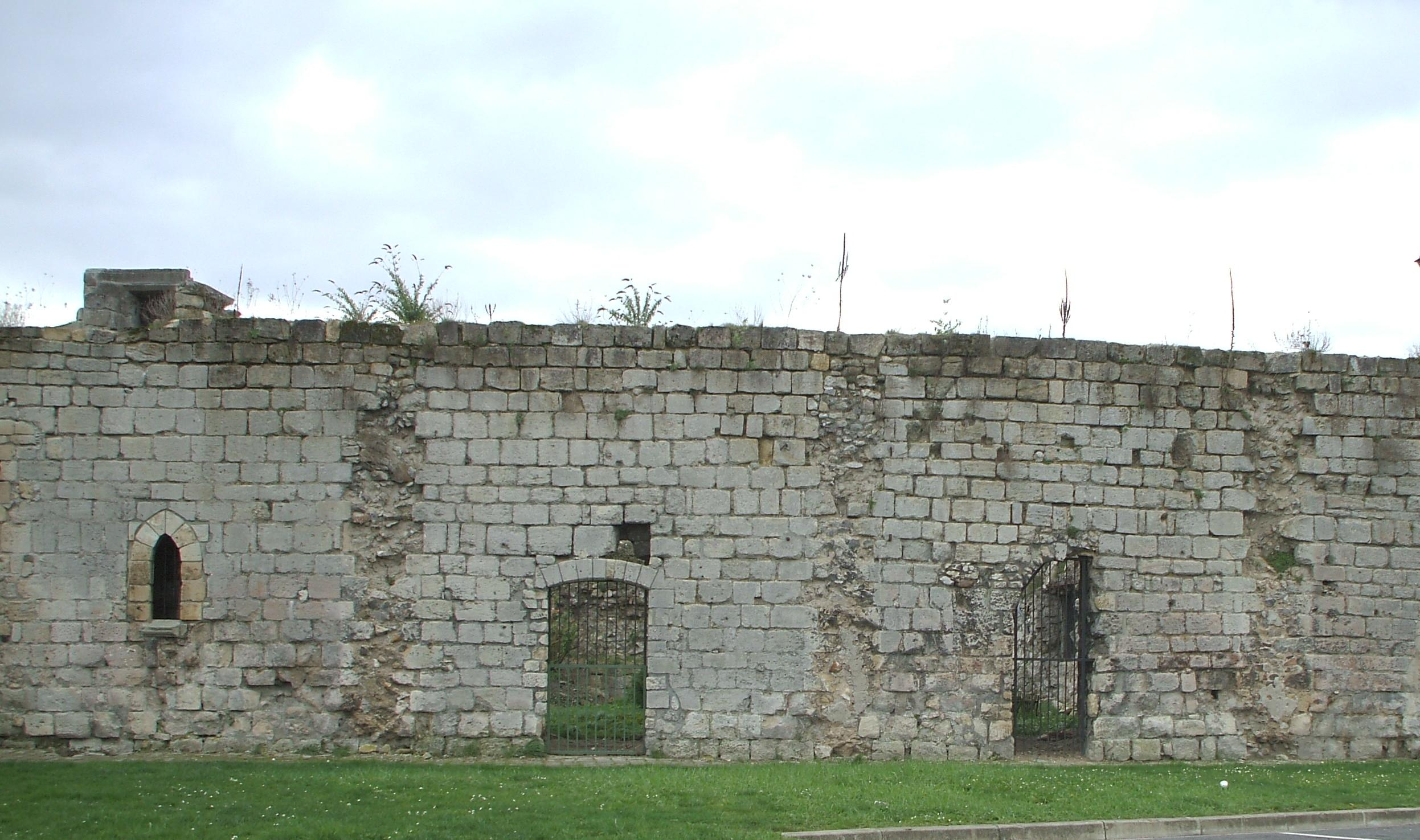
Castle, north view

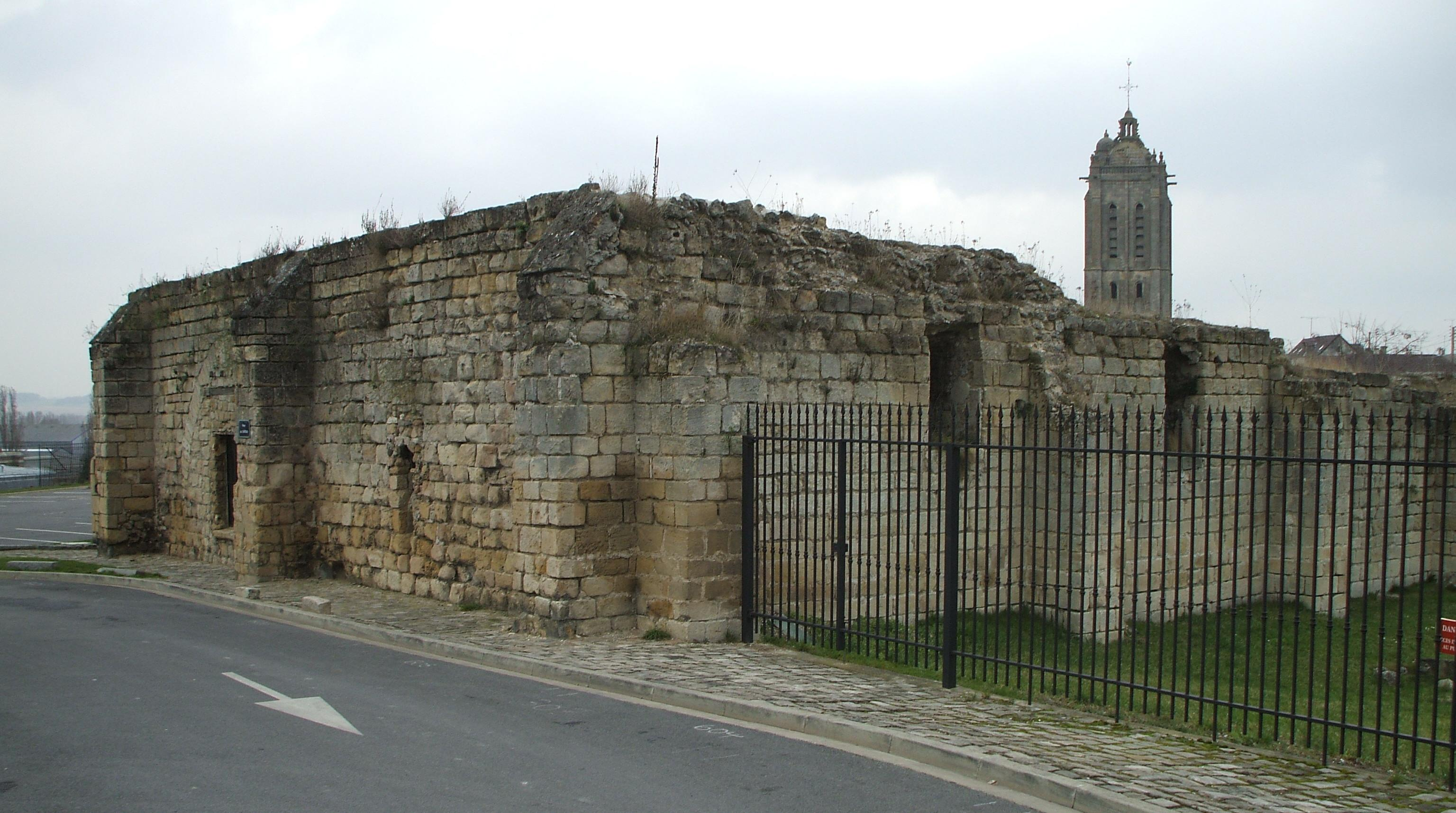
Castle, south west view

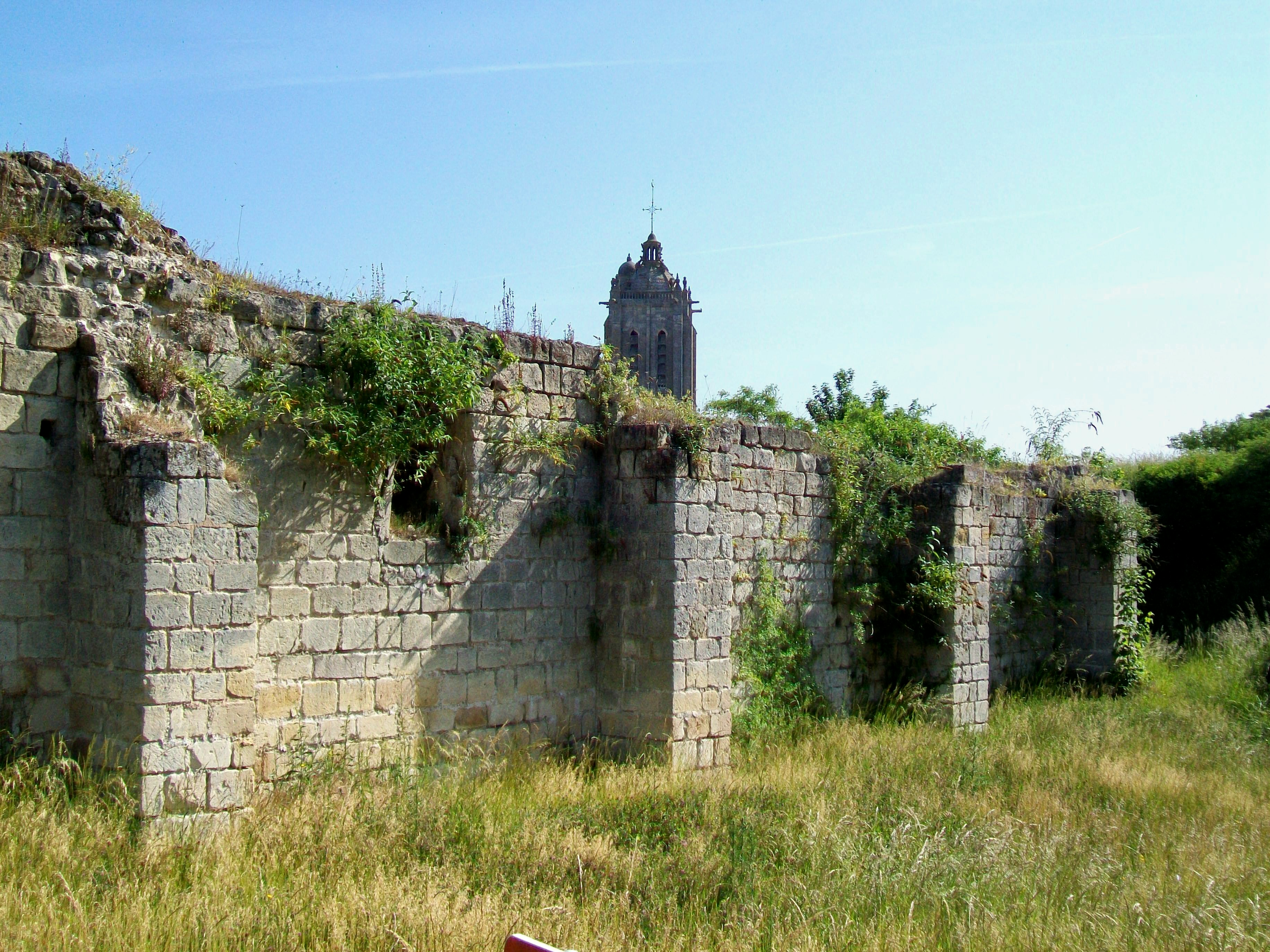
Ruins, with the Saint-Laurent church clock tower behind (2011).

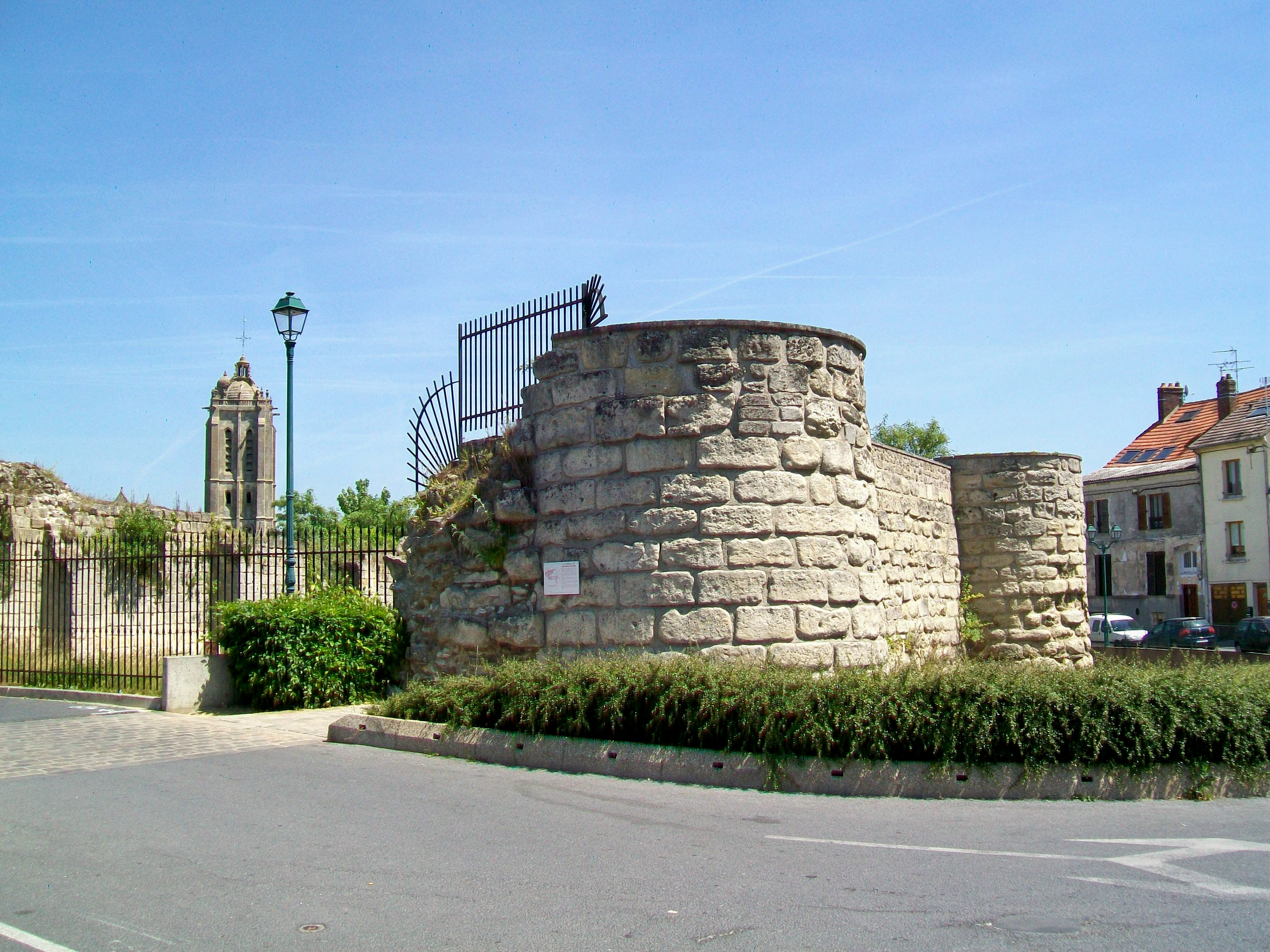
1st and 2nd towers of the five still at this height, seen from Place du Château (2011).

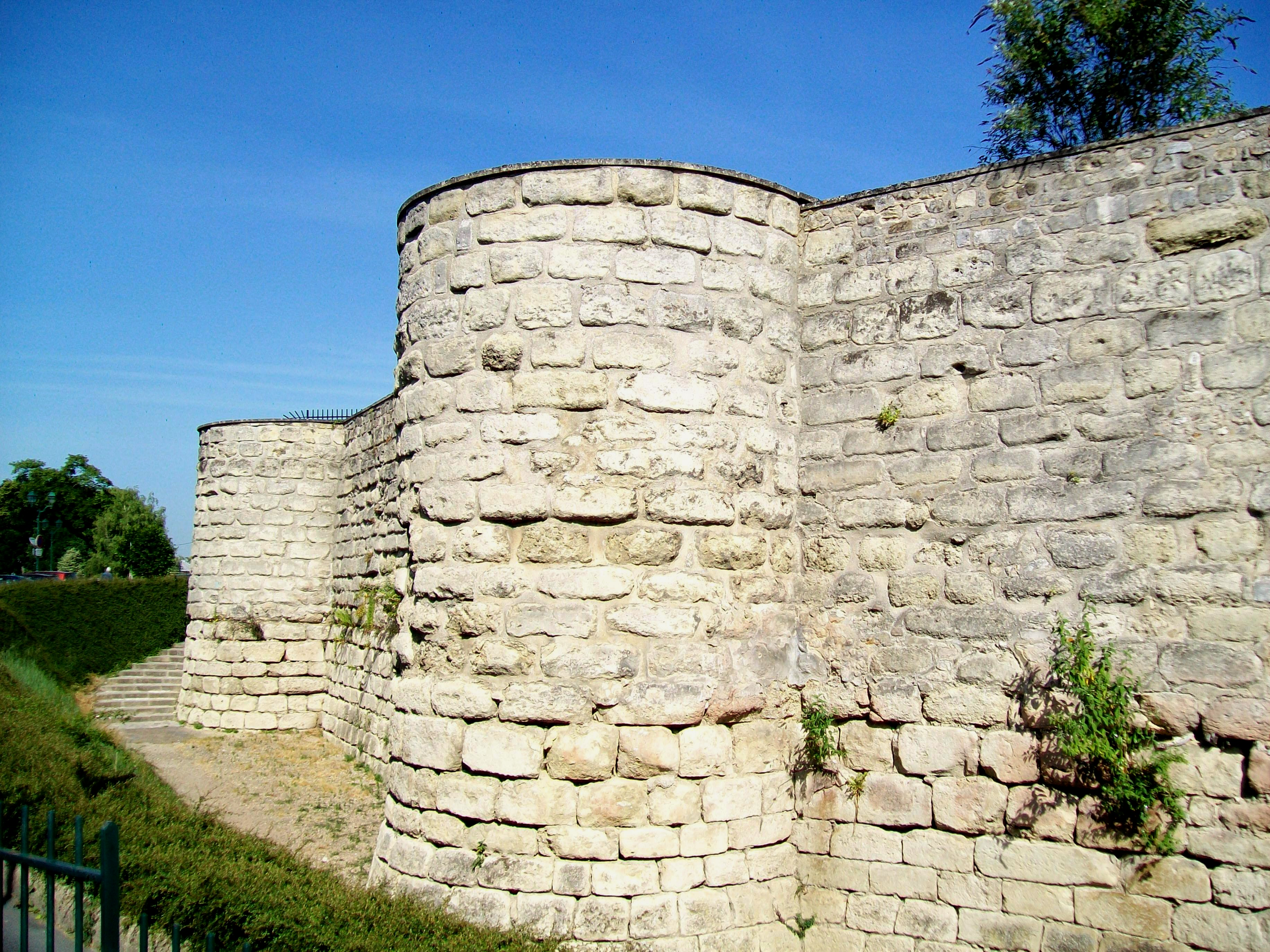
3rd and 2nd towers seen from impasse de l'Esplanade (2011).

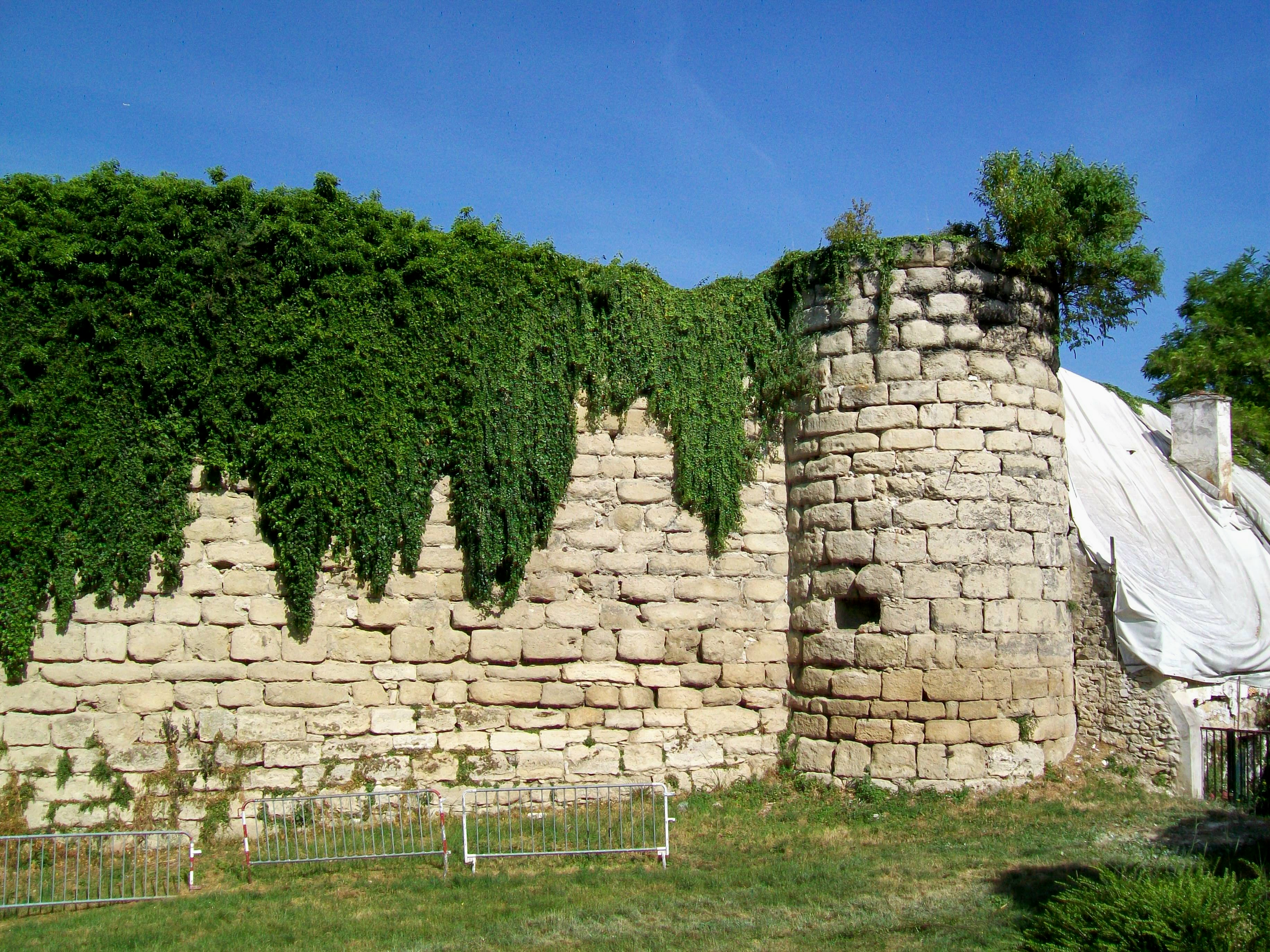
4th tower counting from Place du Château; the 5th is covered for protection during restoration (2011).

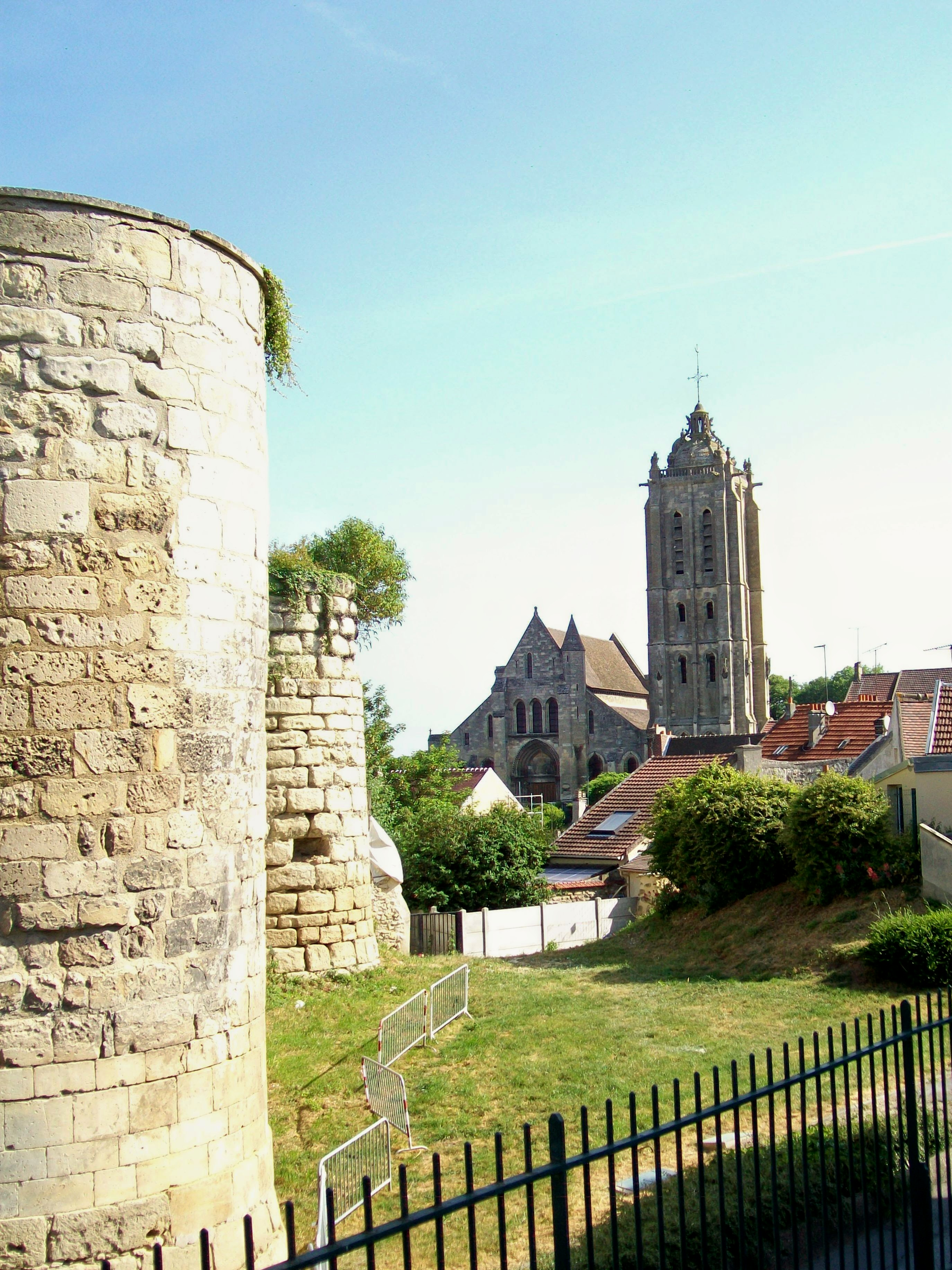
3rd and 4th towers. On right, Saint-Laurent church (2011).

== See also ==
- List of castles in France
