= Communes of the Essonne department =

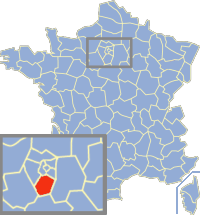

The following is a list of the 194 communes of the Essonne department of France.

The communes cooperate in the following intercommunalities (as of 2025):

- Métropole du Grand Paris (partly)
- Communauté d'agglomération Cœur d'Essonne
- Communauté d'agglomération Étampois Sud Essonne
- Communauté d'agglomération Grand Paris Sud Seine-Essonne-Sénart (partly)
- Communauté d'agglomération Paris-Saclay
- Communauté d'agglomération Val d'Yerres Val de Seine
- Communauté d'agglomération Versailles Grand Parc (partly)
- Communauté de communes des 2 Vallées
- Communauté de communes Le Dourdannais en Hurepoix
- Communauté de communes Entre Juine et Renarde
- Communauté de communes de l'Orée de la Brie (partly)
- Communauté de communes du Pays de Limours
- Communauté de communes du Val d'Essonne

INSEE code	Postal code	Commune
91001	91150	Abbéville-la-Rivière
91016	91670	Angerville
91017	91470	Angervilliers
91021	91290	Arpajon
91022	91690	Arrancourt
91027	91200	Athis-Mons
91035	91410	Authon-la-Plaine
91037	91830	Auvernaux
91038	91580	Auvers-Saint-Georges
91041	91630	Avrainville
91044	91160	Ballainvilliers
91045	91610	Ballancourt-sur-Essonne
91047	91590	Baulne
91064	91570	Bièvres
91067	91150	Blandy
91069	91720	Boigneville
91075	91150	Bois-Herpin
91079	91690	Boissy-la-Rivière
91080	91590	Boissy-le-Cutté
91081	91870	Boissy-le-Sec
91085	91790	Boissy-sous-Saint-Yon
91086	91070	Bondoufle
91093	91470	Boullay-les-Troux
91095	91850	Bouray-sur-Juine
91097	91800	Boussy-Saint-Antoine
91098	91150	Boutervilliers
91099	91820	Boutigny-sur-Essonne
91100	91880	Bouville
91103	91220	Brétigny-sur-Orge
91105	91650	Breuillet
91106	91650	Breux-Jouy
91109	91150	Brières-les-Scellés
91111	91640	Briis-sous-Forges
91112	91150	Brouy
91114	91800	Brunoy
91115	91680	Bruyères-le-Châtel
91121	91720	Buno-Bonnevaux
91122	91440	Bures-sur-Yvette
91129	91590	Cerny
91130	91780	Chalo-Saint-Mars
91131	91740	Chalou-Moulineux
91132	91730	Chamarande
91135	91750	Champcueil
91136	91160	Champlan
91137	91150	Champmotteux
91145	91410	Chatignonville
91148	91580	Chauffour-lès-Étréchy
91156	91630	Cheptainville
91159	91750	Chevannes
91161	91380	Chilly-Mazarin
91613	91740	Congerville-Thionville
91174	91100	Corbeil-Essonnes
91175	91410	Corbreuse
91179	91830	Le Coudray-Montceaux
91180	91490	Courances
91184	91720	Courdimanche-sur-Essonne
91186	91680	Courson-Monteloup
91191	91560	Crosne
91195	91490	Dannemois
91198	91590	D'Huison-Longueville
91200	91410	Dourdan
91201	91210	Draveil
91204	91540	Écharcon
91207	91520	Égly
91215	91860	Épinay-sous-Sénart
91216	91360	Épinay-sur-Orge
91223	91150	Étampes
91225	91450	Étiolles
91226	91580	Étréchy
91228	91000	Évry-Courcouronnes
91232	91590	La Ferté-Alais
91235	91700	Fleury-Mérogis
91240	91690	Fontaine-la-Rivière
91243	91640	Fontenay-lès-Briis
91244	91540	Fontenay-le-Vicomte
91247	91410	La Forêt-le-Roi
91248	91150	La Forêt-Sainte-Croix
91249	91470	Forges-les-Bains
91272	91190	Gif-sur-Yvette
91273	91720	Gironville-sur-Essonne
91274	91400	Gometz-la-Ville
91275	91940	Gometz-le-Châtel
91284	91410	Les Granges-le-Roi
91286	91350	Grigny
91292	91630	Guibeville
91293	91590	Guigneville-sur-Essonne
91294	91690	Guillerval
91312	91430	Igny
91315	91760	Itteville
91318	91510	Janville-sur-Juine
91319	91640	Janvry
91326	91260	Juvisy-sur-Orge
91330	91510	Lardy
91332	91630	Leudeville
91333	91310	Leuville-sur-Orge
91338	91470	Limours

INSEE code	Postal code	Commune
91339	91310	Linas
91340	91090	Lisses
91345	91160	Longjumeau
91347	91310	Longpont-sur-Orge
91359	91720	Maisse
91363	91460	Marcoussis
91374	91150	Marolles-en-Beauce
91376	91630	Marolles-en-Hurepoix
91377	91300	Massy
91378	91730	Mauchamps
91386	91540	Mennecy
91390	91660	Le Mérévillois
91393	91780	Mérobert
91399	91150	Mespuits
91405	91490	Milly-la-Forêt
91408	91490	Moigny-sur-École
91411	91470	Les Molières
91412	91590	Mondeville
91414	91930	Monnerville
91421	91230	Montgeron
91425	91310	Montlhéry
91432	91420	Morangis
91433	91150	Morigny-Champigny
91434	91390	Morsang-sur-Orge
91435	91250	Morsang-sur-Seine
91441	91750	Nainville-les-Roches
91457	91290	La Norville
91458	91620	Nozay
91461	91340	Ollainville
91463	91490	Oncy-sur-École
91468	91540	Ormoy
91469	91150	Ormoy-la-Rivière
91471	91400	Orsay
91473	91590	Orveau
91477	91120	Palaiseau
91479	91550	Paray-Vieille-Poste
91482	91470	Pecqueuse
91494	91220	Le Plessis-Pâté
91495	91410	Plessis-Saint-Benoist
91507	91720	Prunay-sur-Essonne
91508	91150	Puiselet-le-Marais
91511	91740	Pussay
91514	91480	Quincy-sous-Sénart
91519	91410	Richarville
91521	91130	Ris-Orangis
91525	91410	Roinville
91526	91150	Roinvilliers
91533	91690	Saclas
91534	91400	Saclay
91538	91190	Saint-Aubin
91540	91530	Saint-Chéron
91544	91690	Saint-Cyr-la-Rivière
91546	91410	Saint-Cyr-sous-Dourdan
91549	91700	Sainte-Geneviève-des-Bois
91547	91410	Saint-Escobille
91552	91180	Saint-Germain-lès-Arpajon
91553	91250	Saint-Germain-lès-Corbeil
91556	91780	Saint-Hilaire
91560	91940	Saint-Jean-de-Beauregard
91568	91530	Saint-Maurice-Montcouronne
91570	91240	Saint-Michel-sur-Orge
91573	91280	Saint-Pierre-du-Perray
91577	91250	Saintry-sur-Seine
91578	91910	Saint-Sulpice-de-Favières
91579	91770	Saint-Vrain
91581	91650	Saint-Yon
91587	91160	Saulx-les-Chartreux
91589	91600	Savigny-sur-Orge
91593	91530	Sermaise
91599	91840	Soisy-sur-École
91600	91450	Soisy-sur-Seine
91602	91580	Souzy-la-Briche
91617	91250	Tigery
91619	91730	Torfou
91692	91940	Les Ulis
91629	91720	Valpuiseaux
91630	91530	Le Val-Saint-Germain
91631	91480	Varennes-Jarcy
91634	91640	Vaugrigneuse
91635	91430	Vauhallan
91639	91820	Vayres-sur-Essonne
91645	91370	Verrières-le-Buisson
91648	91810	Vert-le-Grand
91649	91710	Vert-le-Petit
91654	91890	Videlles
91657	91270	Vigneux-sur-Seine
91659	91100	Villabé
91661	91140	Villebon-sur-Yvette
91662	91580	Villeconin
91665	91620	La Ville-du-Bois
91666	91140	Villejust
91667	91360	Villemoisson-sur-Orge
91671	91580	Villeneuve-sur-Auvers
91679	91190	Villiers-le-Bâcle
91685	91700	Villiers-sur-Orge
91687	91170	Viry-Châtillon
91689	91320	Wissous
91691	91330	Yerres
