= Arrondissement of Étampes =

Coordinates: 48°25′49″N 2°09′13″E

Étampes
- Arrondissement
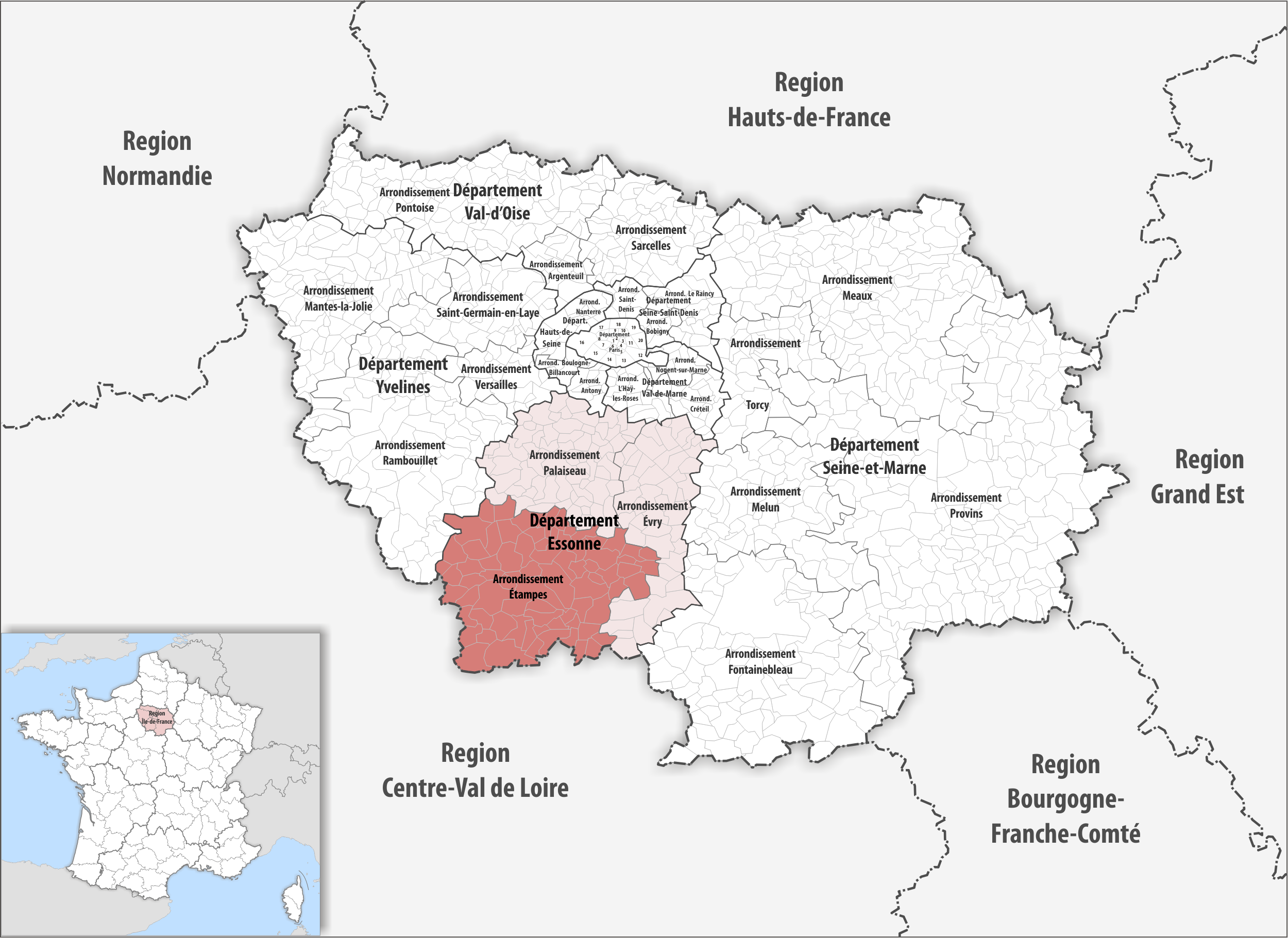
- Location within the region Île-de-France
- Country: France
- Region: Île-de-France
- Department: Essonne
- No. of communes: {{{nbcomm}}}
- Area: 851.4 km^{2} (328.7 sq mi)
- Population (2023): 134,750
  - Density: 158.3/km^{2} (409.9/sq mi)
- INSEE code: 911

The arrondissement of Étampes is an arrondissement of France in the Essonne department in the Île-de-France region. It has 75 communes. Its population is 133,168 (2021), and its area is 851.4 km^{2} (328.7 sq mi).

== Composition ==
The communes of the arrondissement of Étampes, and their INSEE codes, are:

1. Abbéville-la-Rivière (91001)
2. Angerville (91016)
3. Arrancourt (91022)
4. Authon-la-Plaine (91035)
5. Auvers-Saint-Georges (91038)
6. Baulne (91047)
7. Blandy (91067)
8. Bois-Herpin (91075)
9. Boissy-la-Rivière (91079)
10. Boissy-le-Cutté (91080)
11. Boissy-le-Sec (91081)
12. Boissy-sous-Saint-Yon (91085)
13. Bouray-sur-Juine (91095)
14. Boutervilliers (91098)
15. Boutigny-sur-Essonne (91099)
16. Bouville (91100)
17. Breux-Jouy (91106)
18. Brières-les-Scellés (91109)
19. Brouy (91112)
20. Cerny (91129)
21. Chalo-Saint-Mars (91130)
22. Chalou-Moulineux (91131)
23. Chamarande (91132)
24. Champmotteux (91137)
25. Chatignonville (91145)
26. Chauffour-lès-Étréchy (91148)
27. Congerville-Thionville (91613)
28. Corbreuse (91175)
29. D'Huison-Longueville (91198)
30. Dourdan (91200)
31. Étampes (91223)
32. Étréchy (91226)
33. La Ferté-Alais (91232)
34. Fontaine-la-Rivière (91240)
35. La Forêt-le-Roi (91247)
36. La Forêt-Sainte-Croix (91248)
37. Les Granges-le-Roi (91284)
38. Guigneville-sur-Essonne (91293)
39. Guillerval (91294)
40. Itteville (91315)
41. Janville-sur-Juine (91318)
42. Lardy (91330)
43. Marolles-en-Beauce (91374)
44. Mauchamps (91378)
45. Le Mérévillois (91390)
46. Mérobert (91393)
47. Mespuits (91399)
48. Mondeville (91412)
49. Monnerville (91414)
50. Morigny-Champigny (91433)
51. Ormoy-la-Rivière (91469)
52. Orveau (91473)
53. Plessis-Saint-Benoist (91495)
54. Puiselet-le-Marais (91508)
55. Pussay (91511)
56. Richarville (91519)
57. Roinville (91525)
58. Roinvilliers (91526)
59. Saclas (91533)
60. Saint-Chéron (91540)
61. Saint-Cyr-la-Rivière (91544)
62. Saint-Cyr-sous-Dourdan (91546)
63. Saint-Escobille (91547)
64. Saint-Hilaire (91556)
65. Saint-Sulpice-de-Favières (91578)
66. Saint-Yon (91581)
67. Sermaise (91593)
68. Souzy-la-Briche (91602)
69. Torfou (91619)
70. Valpuiseaux (91629)
71. Le Val-Saint-Germain (91630)
72. Vayres-sur-Essonne (91639)
73. Videlles (91654)
74. Villeconin (91662)
75. Villeneuve-sur-Auvers (91671)

== History ==
The arrondissement of Étampes was created in 1800 as part of the department Seine-et-Oise, disbanded in 1926 and restored in 1966. In 1968 it became part of the new department Essonne. At the January 2017 reorganisation of the arrondissements of Essonne, it lost three communes to the arrondissement of Palaiseau.

As a result of the reorganisation of the cantons of France which came into effect in 2015, the borders of the cantons are no longer related to the borders of the arrondissements. The cantons of the arrondissement of Étampes were, as of January 2015:

1. Dourdan
2. Étampes
3. Étréchy
4. La Ferté-Alais
5. Méréville
6. Saint-Chéron
