= Saint-Benoist =

Saint-Benoist may refer to:

- Plessis-Saint-Benoist, a commune in northern France
- Saint-Benoist-sur-Mer, a commune in western France
- Saint-Benoist-sur-Vanne, a commune in north-central France
