= Bouville, Essonne =

Commune in Île-de-France, France

Bouville
- Commune
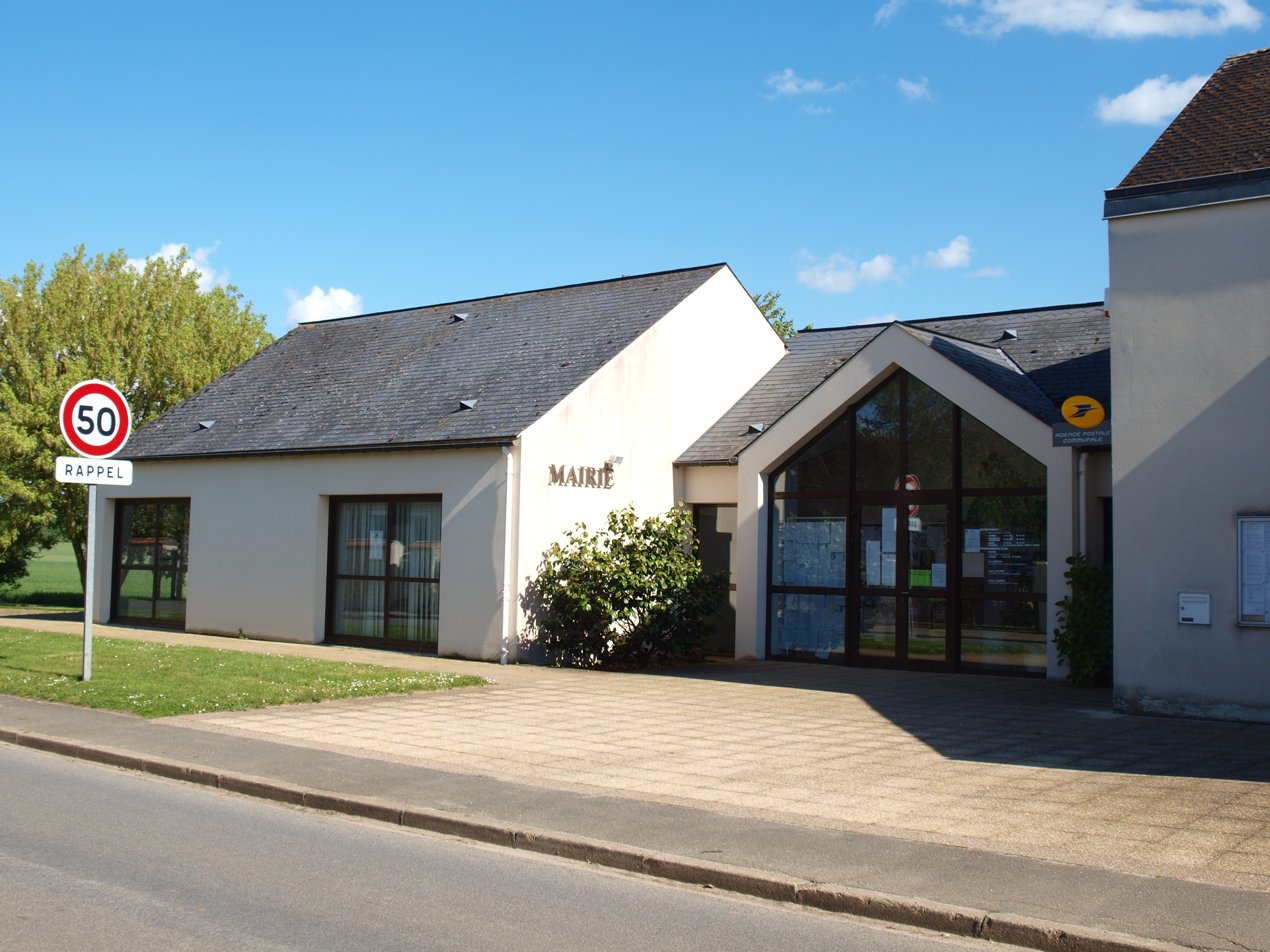
- The town hall of Bouville

- Coat of arms
- Location of Bouville
- Location within France Location within Île-de-France (region)
- Coordinates: 48°25′54″N 2°16′33″E
- Country: France
- Region: Île-de-France
- Department: Essonne
- Arrondissement: Étampes
- Canton: Étampes
- Intercommunality: CA Étampois Sud Essonne

Government
  - Mayor (2020–2026): Michel Morichon
- Area^{1}: 20.53 km^{2} (7.93 sq mi)
- Highest elevation: 152 m (499 ft)
- Lowest elevation: 66 m (217 ft)
- Population (2023): 669
  - Density: 32.6/km^{2} (84.4/sq mi)
- Time zone: UTC+01:00 (CET)
  - Summer (DST): UTC+02:00 (CEST)
- INSEE/Postal code: 91100 /91880
- ^{1} French Land Register data, which excludes lakes, ponds, glaciers > 1 km^{2} (0.386 sq mi or 247 acres) and river estuaries.

Bouville (French pronunciation: [buvil]) is a commune in the Essonne department in Île-de-France in northern France.

Inhabitants of Bouville are known as Bouvillons.

== See also ==
- Communes of the Essonne department
