= Saint-Hilaire, Essonne =

Commune in Île-de-France, France

Saint-Hilaire
- Commune
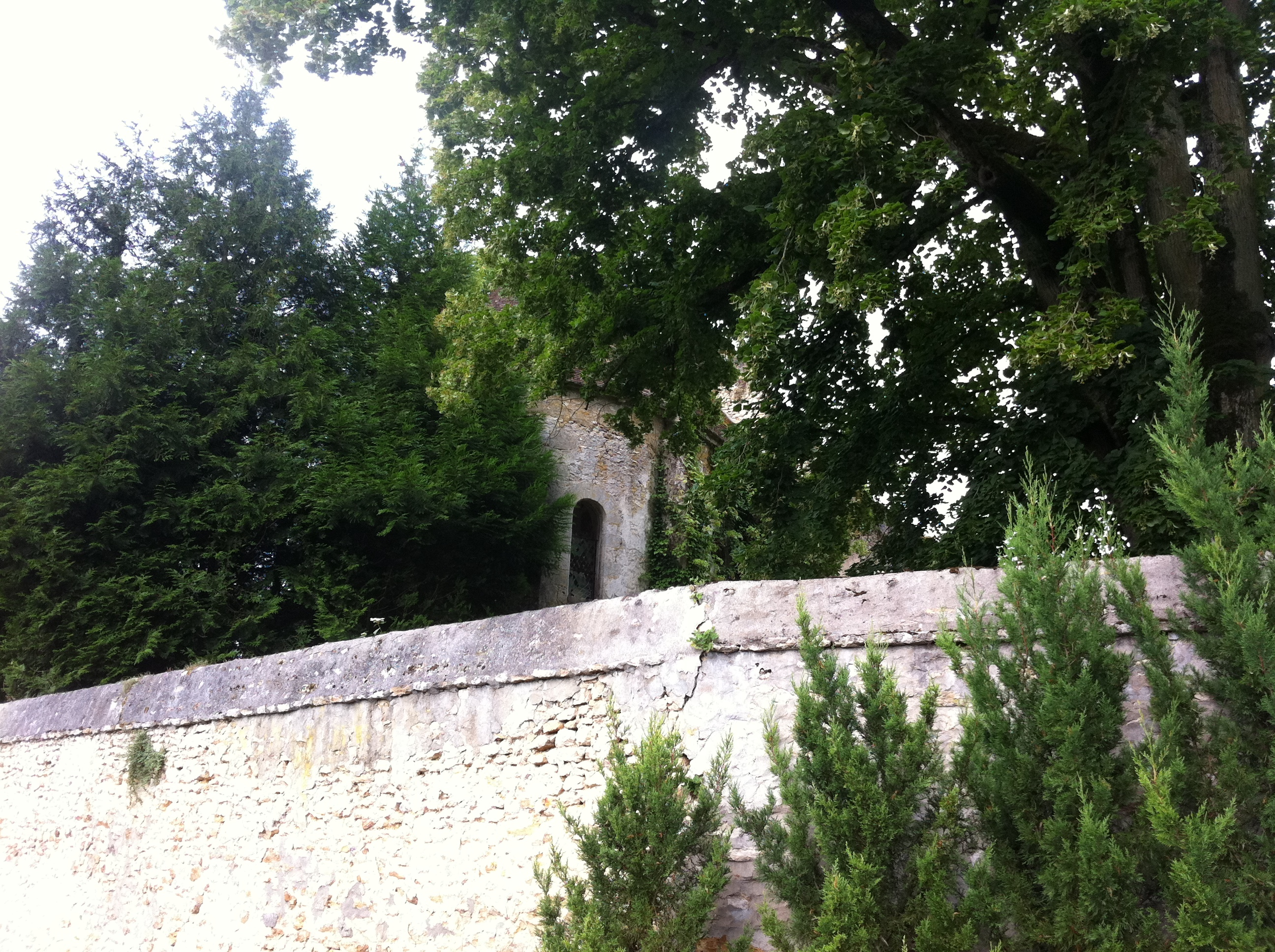
- The ruins of the church of Saint-Hilaire
- Location of Saint-Hilaire
- Location within France Location within Île-de-France (region)
- Coordinates: 48°26′00″N 2°04′34″E
- Country: France
- Region: Île-de-France
- Department: Essonne
- Arrondissement: Étampes
- Canton: Étampes
- Intercommunality: CA Étampois Sud Essonne

Government
  - Mayor (2020–2026): Stéphane Demeulemeester
- Area^{1}: 6.79 km^{2} (2.62 sq mi)
- Highest elevation: 154 m (505 ft)
- Lowest elevation: 82 m (269 ft)
- Population (2023): 401
  - Density: 59.1/km^{2} (153/sq mi)
- Time zone: UTC+01:00 (CET)
  - Summer (DST): UTC+02:00 (CEST)
- INSEE/Postal code: 91556 /91780
- ^{1} French Land Register data, which excludes lakes, ponds, glaciers > 1 km^{2} (0.386 sq mi or 247 acres) and river estuaries.

Saint-Hilaire (French pronunciation: [sɛ̃.t‿ilɛʁ]) is a commune in the Essonne department in Île-de-France in northern France.

Inhabitants of Saint-Hilaire are known as Saint-Hilairois.

== See also ==
- Communes of the Essonne department
