= Arrancourt =

Commune in Île-de-France, France

- Commune
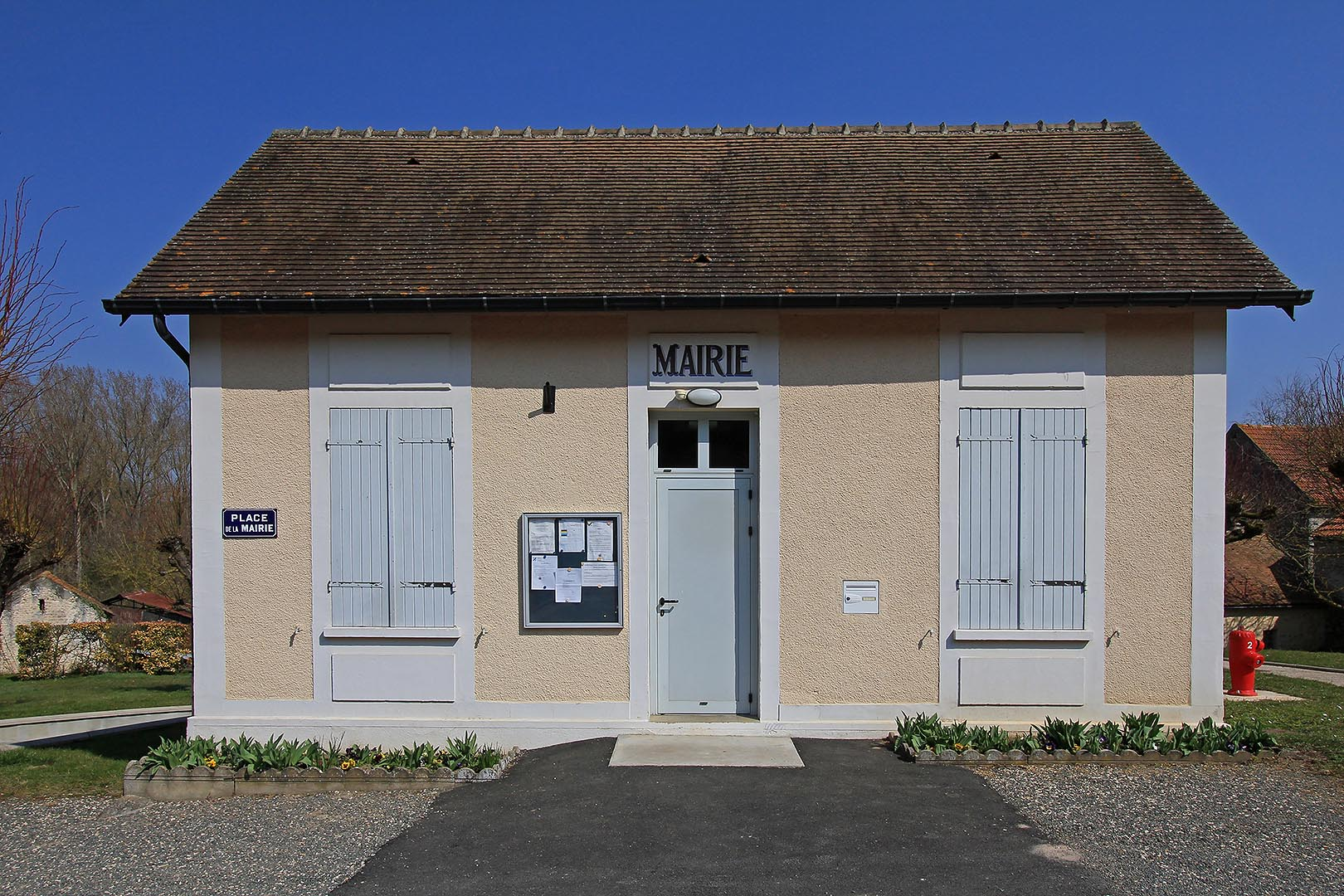
- The town hall of Arrancourt

- Coat of arms
- Location of Arrancourt
- Location within France Location within Île-de-France (region)
- Coordinates: 48°20′31″N 2°09′43″E
- Country: France
- Region: Île-de-France
- Department: Essonne
- Arrondissement: Étampes
- Canton: Étampes
- Intercommunality: CA Étampois Sud Essonne

Government
  - Mayor (2020–2026): Denis Yannou
- Area^{1}: 7.40 km^{2} (2.86 sq mi)
- Highest elevation: 137 m (449 ft)
- Lowest elevation: 77 m (253 ft)
- Population (2023): 115
  - Density: 15.5/km^{2} (40.2/sq mi)
- Time zone: UTC+01:00 (CET)
  - Summer (DST): UTC+02:00 (CEST)
- INSEE/Postal code: 91022 /91690
- ^{1} French Land Register data, which excludes lakes, ponds, glaciers > 1 km^{2} (0.386 sq mi or 247 acres) and river estuaries.

Arrancourt (French pronunciation: [aʁɑ̃kuʁ]) is a commune in the Essonne department in Île-de-France in northern France.

Inhabitants of Arrancourt are known as Arrancourtois.

== See also ==
- Communes of the Essonne department
