= Champmotteux =

Commune in Île-de-France, France

- Commune
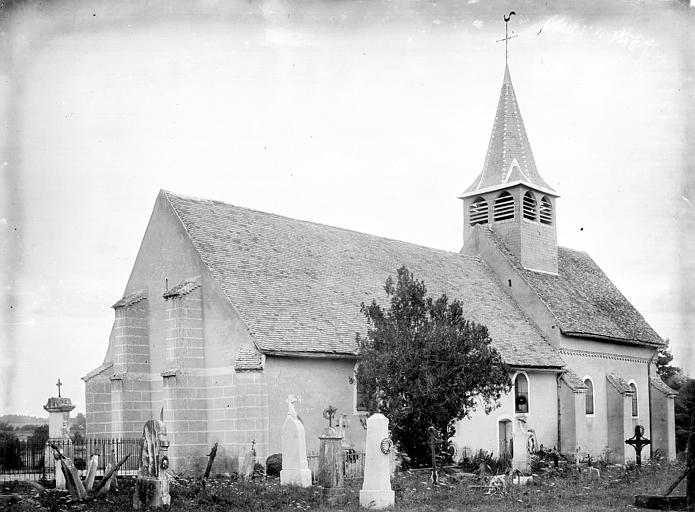
- The church in Champmotteux, in the early 20th century
- Location of Champmotteux
- Location within France Location within Île-de-France (region)
- Coordinates: 48°20′32″N 2°19′16″E
- Country: France
- Region: Île-de-France
- Department: Essonne
- Arrondissement: Étampes
- Canton: Étampes
- Intercommunality: CA Étampois Sud Essonne

Government
  - Mayor (2020–2026): Jerôme Desnoue
- Area^{1}: 7.57 km^{2} (2.92 sq mi)
- Highest elevation: 147 m (482 ft)
- Lowest elevation: 102 m (335 ft)
- Population (2023): 356
  - Density: 47.0/km^{2} (122/sq mi)
- Time zone: UTC+01:00 (CET)
  - Summer (DST): UTC+02:00 (CEST)
- INSEE/Postal code: 91137 /91150
- ^{1} French Land Register data, which excludes lakes, ponds, glaciers > 1 km^{2} (0.386 sq mi or 247 acres) and river estuaries.

Champmotteux (French pronunciation: [ʃɑ̃mɔtø]) is a commune in the Essonne department in Île-de-France in northern France.

Inhabitants of Champmotteux are known as Champmottois.

== See also ==
- Communes of the Essonne department
