= Boissy-le-Sec =

Commune in Île-de-France, France

- Commune
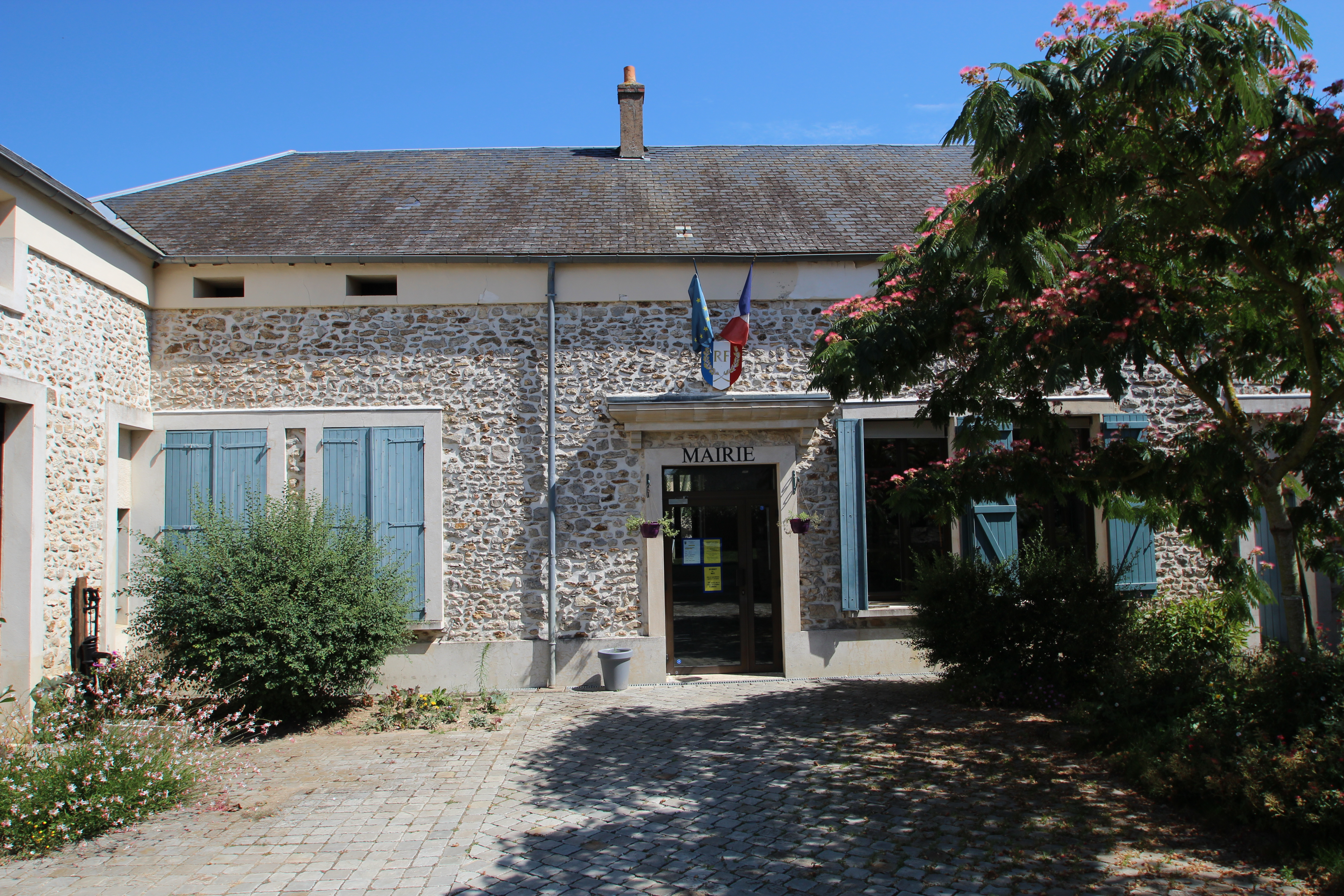
- The town hall of Boissy-le-Sec, in 2013

- Coat of arms
- Location of Boissy-le-Sec
- Location within France Location within Île-de-France (region)
- Coordinates: 48°28′40″N 2°05′20″E
- Country: France
- Region: Île-de-France
- Department: Essonne
- Arrondissement: Étampes
- Canton: Étampes
- Intercommunality: CA Étampois Sud Essonne

Government
  - Mayor (2024–2026): Patrice Kopacz
- Area^{1}: 19.06 km^{2} (7.36 sq mi)
- Highest elevation: 157 m (515 ft)
- Lowest elevation: 92 m (302 ft)
- Population (2023): 690
  - Density: 36/km^{2} (94/sq mi)
- Time zone: UTC+01:00 (CET)
  - Summer (DST): UTC+02:00 (CEST)
- INSEE/Postal code: 91081 /91870
- ^{1} French Land Register data, which excludes lakes, ponds, glaciers > 1 km^{2} (0.386 sq mi or 247 acres) and river estuaries.

Boissy-le-Sec (French pronunciation: [bwasi lə sɛk]) is a commune in the Essonne department in Île-de-France in northern France.

Inhabitants of Boissy-le-Sec are known as Boissyons.

== See also ==
- Communes of the Essonne department
