= Fontaine-la-Rivière =

Commune in Île-de-France, France

- Commune
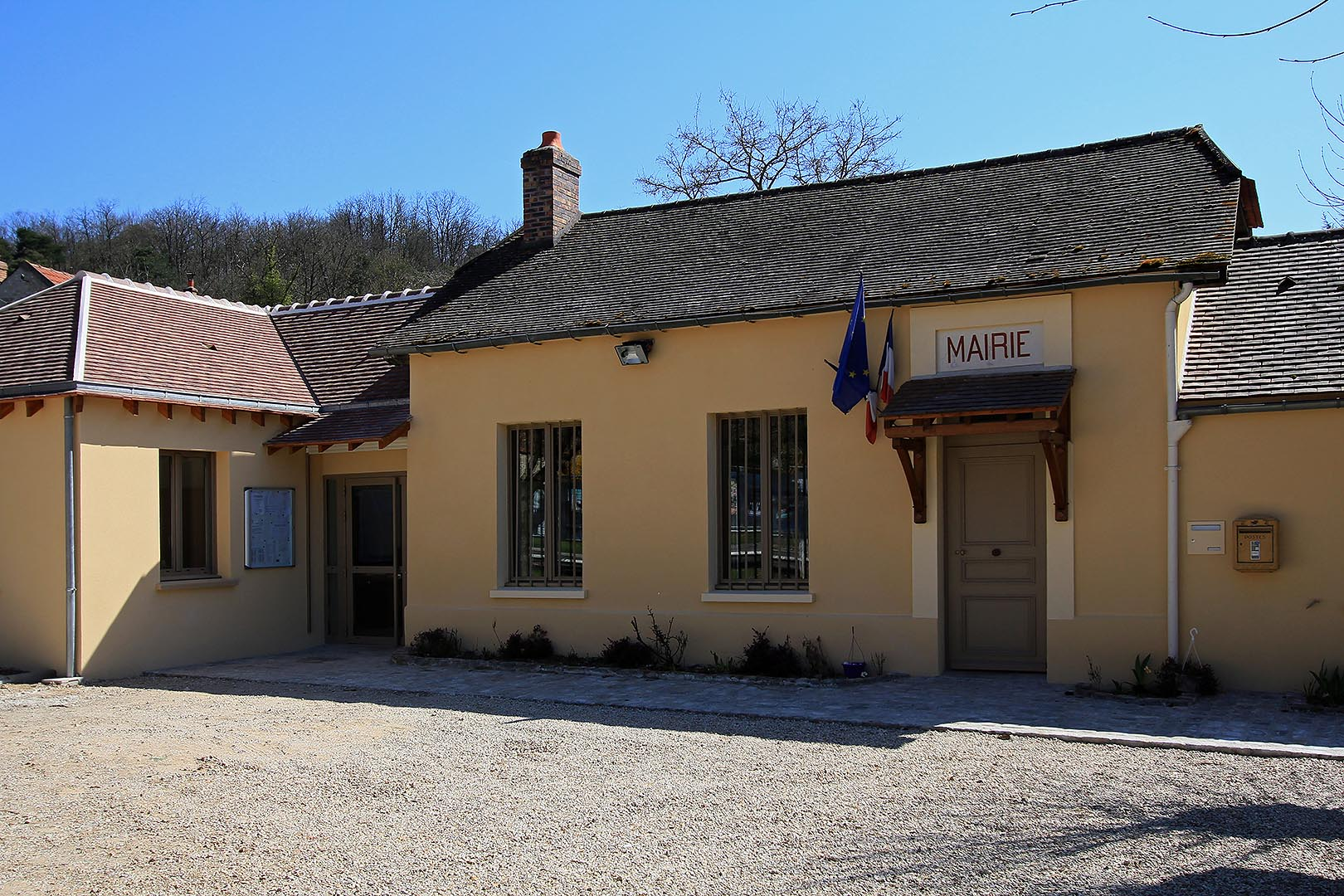
- The town hall in Fontaine-la-Rivière

- Coat of arms
- Location of Fontaine-la-Rivière
- Location within France Location within Île-de-France (region)
- Coordinates: 48°21′24″N 2°09′14″E
- Country: France
- Region: Île-de-France
- Department: Essonne
- Arrondissement: Étampes
- Canton: Étampes
- Intercommunality: CA Étampois Sud Essonne

Government
  - Mayor (2020–2026): Yvon Boukaya
- Area^{1}: 3.69 km^{2} (1.42 sq mi)
- Highest elevation: 149 m (489 ft)
- Lowest elevation: 74 m (243 ft)
- Population (2023): 192
  - Density: 52.0/km^{2} (135/sq mi)
- Demonym: Fontainiens
- Time zone: UTC+01:00 (CET)
  - Summer (DST): UTC+02:00 (CEST)
- INSEE/Postal code: 91240 /91690
- Website: fontainelariviere.fr
- ^{1} French Land Register data, which excludes lakes, ponds, glaciers > 1 km^{2} (0.386 sq mi or 247 acres) and river estuaries.

Fontaine-la-Rivière (French pronunciation: [fɔ̃tɛn la ʁivjɛʁ]; lit. 'Fountain-the-River') is a rural commune in the south of the Essonne department in Île-de-France in northern France.

Inhabitants of Fontaine-la-Rivière are known as Fontainiens (masculine) and Fontainiennes (feminine) in French.

== See also ==
- Communes of the Essonne department
