= Brouy =

Commune in Île-de-France, France

- Commune
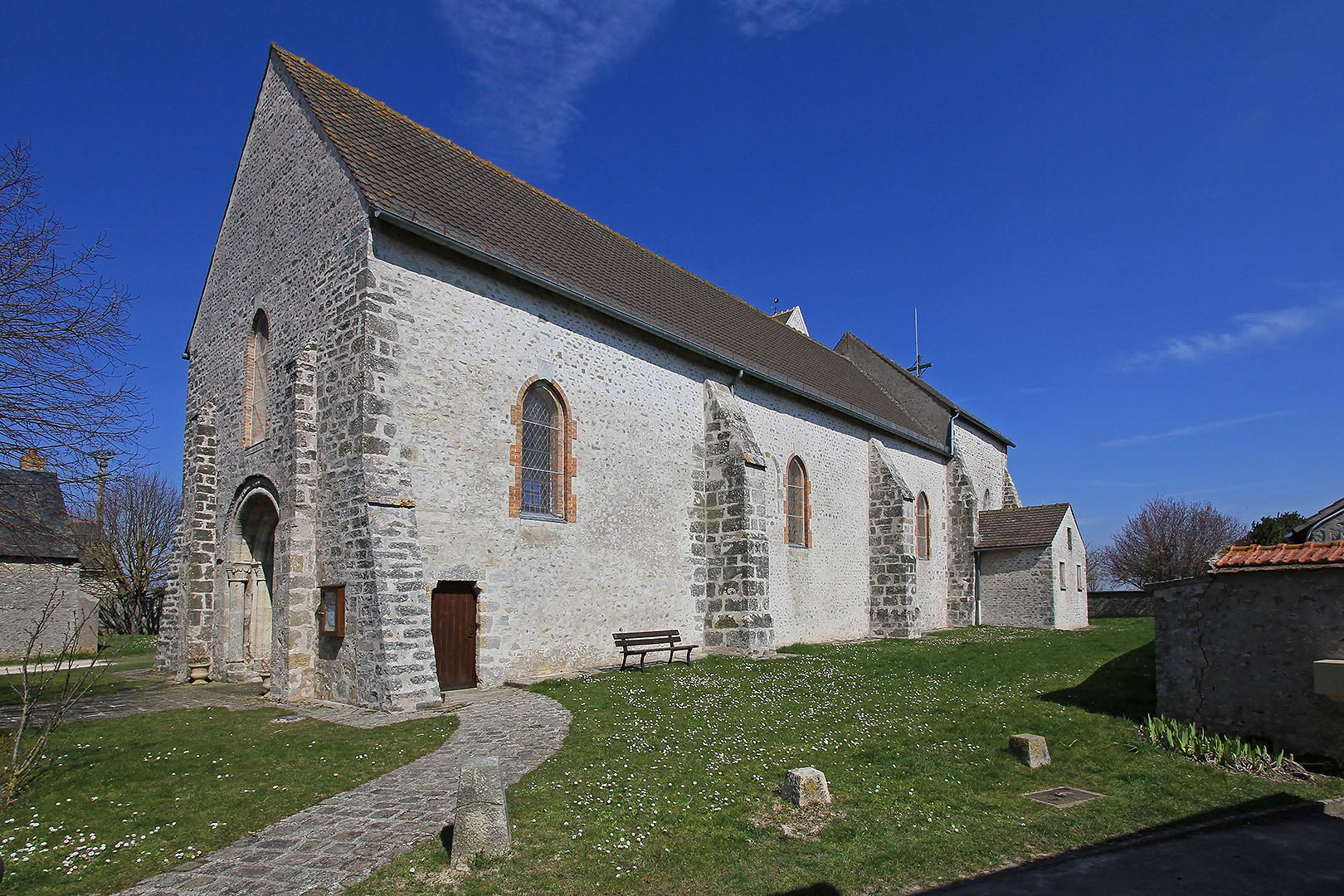
- The church of Saint-Pierre-et-Saint-Paul in Brouy, in 2013
- Location of Brouy
- Location within France Location within Île-de-France (region)
- Coordinates: 48°18′59″N 2°16′44″E
- Country: France
- Region: Île-de-France
- Department: Essonne
- Arrondissement: Étampes
- Canton: Étampes
- Intercommunality: CA Étampois Sud Essonne

Government
  - Mayor (2020–2026): Jean-Louis Chandelier
- Area^{1}: 8.39 km^{2} (3.24 sq mi)
- Highest elevation: 147 m (482 ft)
- Lowest elevation: 114 m (374 ft)
- Population (2023): 134
  - Density: 16.0/km^{2} (41.4/sq mi)
- Time zone: UTC+01:00 (CET)
  - Summer (DST): UTC+02:00 (CEST)
- INSEE/Postal code: 91112 /91150
- ^{1} French Land Register data, which excludes lakes, ponds, glaciers > 1 km^{2} (0.386 sq mi or 247 acres) and river estuaries.

Brouy (French pronunciation: [bʁui]) is a commune in the Essonne department in Île-de-France in northern France.

Inhabitants of Brouy are known as Brogaçois.

== See also ==
- Communes of the Essonne department
