= Pussay =

Commune in Île-de-France, France

- Commune
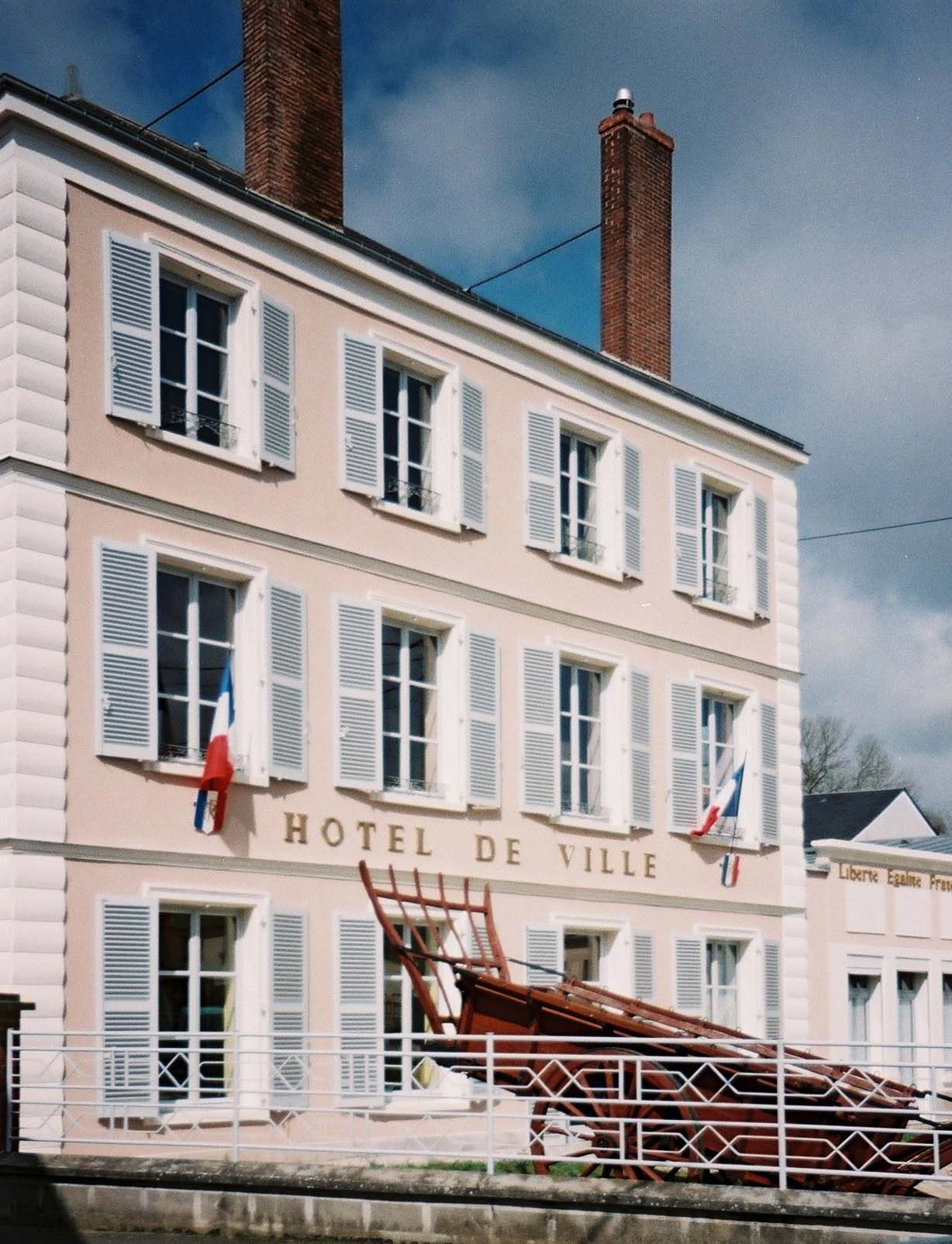
- The town hall in Pussay

- Coat of arms
- Location of Pussay
- Location within France Location within Île-de-France (region)
- Coordinates: 48°21′00″N 1°59′36″E
- Country: France
- Region: Île-de-France
- Department: Essonne
- Arrondissement: Étampes
- Canton: Étampes
- Intercommunality: CA Étampois Sud Essonne

Government
  - Mayor (2020–2026): Grégory Courtas
- Area^{1}: 11.55 km^{2} (4.46 sq mi)
- Highest elevation: 147 m (482 ft)
- Lowest elevation: 122 m (400 ft)
- Population (2023): 2,288
  - Density: 198.1/km^{2} (513.1/sq mi)
- Time zone: UTC+01:00 (CET)
  - Summer (DST): UTC+02:00 (CEST)
- INSEE/Postal code: 91511 /91740
- ^{1} French Land Register data, which excludes lakes, ponds, glaciers > 1 km^{2} (0.386 sq mi or 247 acres) and river estuaries.

Pussay (French pronunciation: [pysɛ]) is a commune in the Essonne department in Île-de-France in northern France.

== Population ==
Historical population
Year	Pop.	±% p.a.
1968	1,600	—
1975	1,538	−0.56%
1982	1,436	−0.98%
1990	1,494	+0.50%
1999	1,726	+1.62%
2007	1,790	+0.46%
2012	2,011	+2.36%
2017	2,200	+1.81%
2023	2,288	+0.66%
Source: INSEE

Inhabitants of Pussay are known as Pusseins in French.

== See also ==
- Communes of the Essonne department
