= Abbéville-la-Rivière =

Commune in Île-de-France, France

- Commune
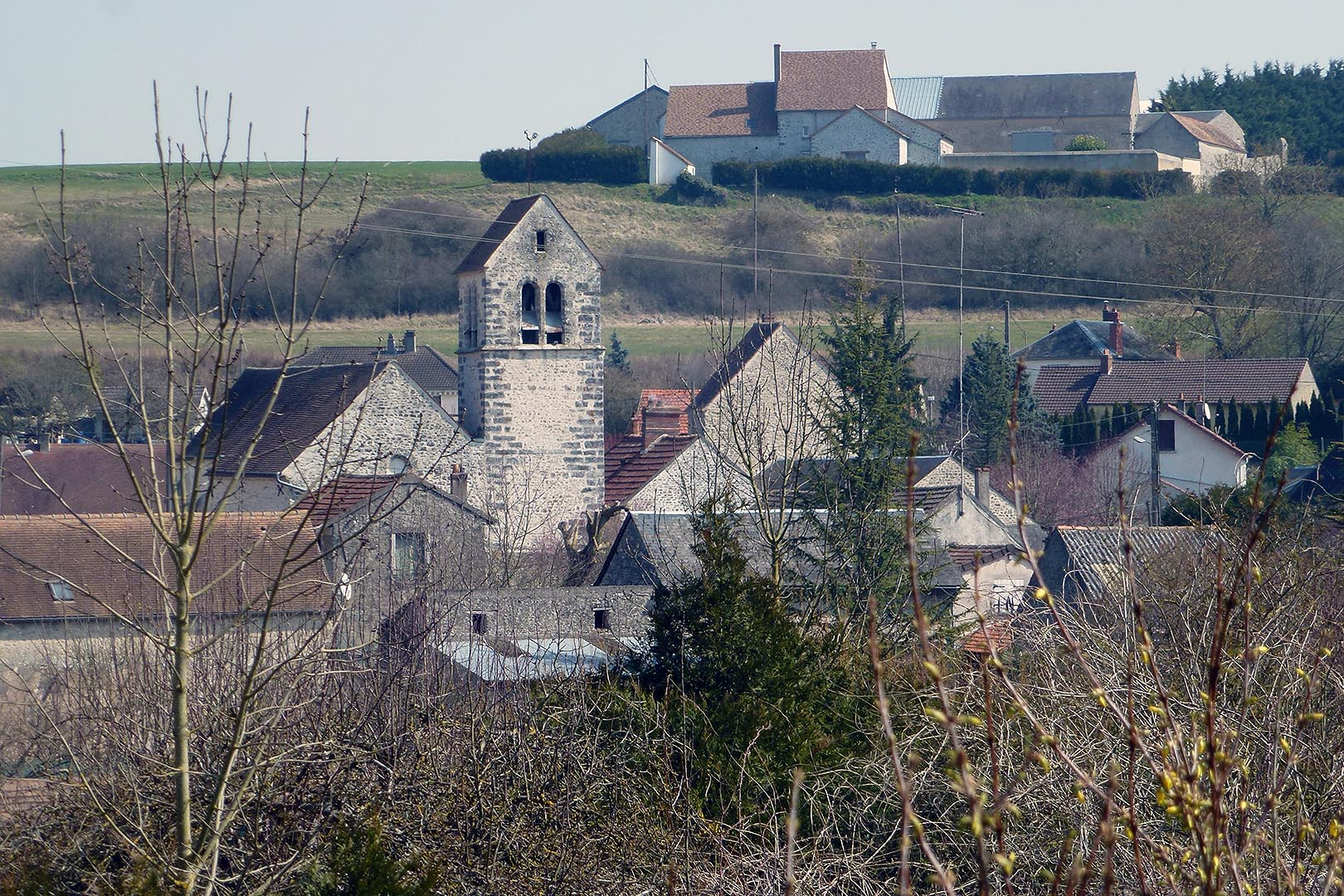
- A general view of the village

- Coat of arms
- Location of Abbéville-la-Rivière
- Location within France Location within Île-de-France (region)
- Coordinates: 48°20′45″N 2°09′59″E
- Country: France
- Region: Île-de-France
- Department: Essonne
- Arrondissement: Étampes
- Canton: Étampes
- Intercommunality: CA Étampois Sud Essonne

Government
  - Mayor (2020–2026): Éric Meyer
- Area^{1}: 15.02 km^{2} (5.80 sq mi)
- Highest elevation: 147 m (482 ft)
- Lowest elevation: 77 m (253 ft)
- Population (2023): 322
  - Density: 21.4/km^{2} (55.5/sq mi)
- Demonym: Abbevillois
- Time zone: UTC+01:00 (CET)
  - Summer (DST): UTC+02:00 (CEST)
- INSEE/Postal code: 91001 /91150
- ^{1} French Land Register data, which excludes lakes, ponds, glaciers > 1 km^{2} (0.386 sq mi or 247 acres) and river estuaries.

Abbéville-la-Rivière (French pronunciation: [abevil la ʁivjɛʁ]; lit. 'Abbéville-the-River') is a rural commune in the Essonne department in Île-de-France in northern France.

Inhabitants are known as Abbevillois (masculine) and Abbevilloises (feminine) in French.

== Population ==
Historical population

Year	Pop.	±% p.a.
1793	379	—
1821	347	−0.31%
1846	360	+0.15%
1872	294	−0.78%
1901	246	−0.61%
1926	238	−0.13%
1946	203	−0.79%
1962	185	−0.58%
1968	190	+0.45%

Year	Pop.	±% p.a.
1975	190	+0.00%
1982	213	+1.65%
1990	233	+1.13%
1999	262	+1.31%
2007	289	+1.23%
2012	291	+0.14%
2017	303	+0.81%
2023	322	+1.02%

Source: EHESS and INSEE

== See also ==
- Communes of the Essonne department
