= Congerville-Thionville =

Commune in Île-de-France, France

- Commune
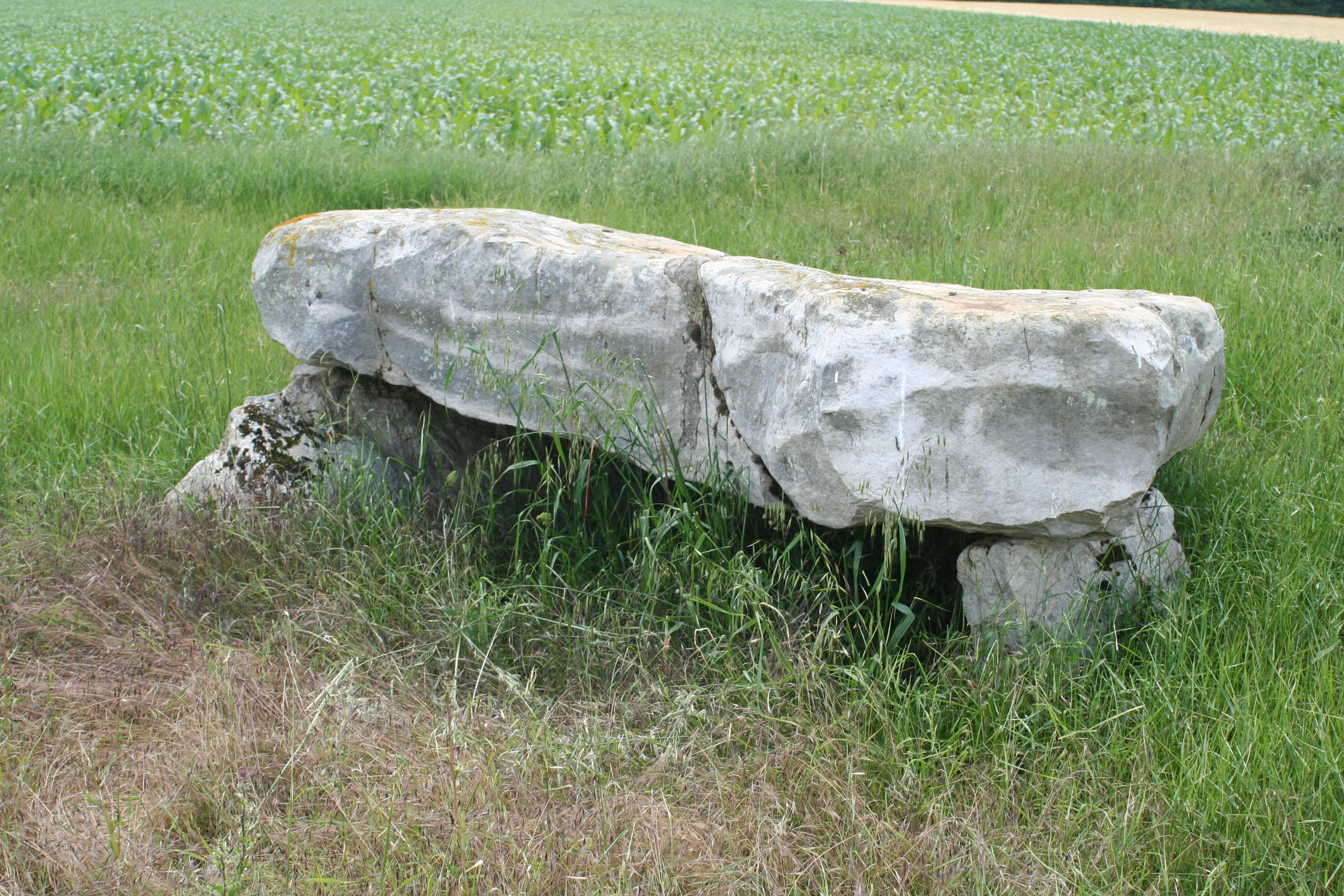
- The dolmen of Grès de Linas, in Congerville-Thionville
- Location of Congerville-Thionville
- Location within France Location within Île-de-France (region)
- Coordinates: 48°23′14″N 1°59′19″E
- Country: France
- Region: Île-de-France
- Department: Essonne
- Arrondissement: Étampes
- Canton: Étampes
- Intercommunality: CA Étampois Sud Essonne

Government
  - Mayor (2020–2026): Thierry Guérin
- Area^{1}: 8.47 km^{2} (3.27 sq mi)
- Highest elevation: 151 m (495 ft)
- Lowest elevation: 113 m (371 ft)
- Population (2023): 211
  - Density: 24.9/km^{2} (64.5/sq mi)
- Time zone: UTC+01:00 (CET)
  - Summer (DST): UTC+02:00 (CEST)
- INSEE/Postal code: 91613 /91740
- ^{1} French Land Register data, which excludes lakes, ponds, glaciers > 1 km^{2} (0.386 sq mi or 247 acres) and river estuaries.

Congerville-Thionville (French pronunciation: [kɔ̃ʒɛʁvil tjɔ̃vil]) is a commune in the Essonne department in Île-de-France in northern France. It was created in 1974 by the merger of two former communes: Congerville and Thionville.

Inhabitants of Congerville-Thionville are known as Congervillois-Thionvillois.

== Geography ==
=== Climate ===
Congerville-Thionville has an oceanic climate (Köppen climate classification Cfb). The average annual temperature in Congerville-Thionville is 10.9 °C (51.6 °F). The average annual rainfall is 634.7 mm (24.99 in) with May as the wettest month. The temperatures are highest on average in July, at around 18.9 °C (66.0 °F), and lowest in January, at around 3.7 °C (38.7 °F). The highest temperature ever recorded in Congerville-Thionville was 38.0 °C (100.4 °F) on 10 August 1998; the coldest temperature ever recorded was −18.5 °C (−1.3 °F) on 17 January 1985.

Climate data for Congerville-Thionville (1981−2010 normals, extremes 1984−2000)
Month	Jan	Feb	Mar	Apr	May	Jun	Jul	Aug	Sep	Oct	Nov	Dec	Year
Record high °C (°F)	15.5 (59.9)	19.0 (66.2)	22.0 (71.6)	27.0 (80.6)	29.0 (84.2)	33.0 (91.4)	37.0 (98.6)	38.0 (100.4)	32.0 (89.6)	29.5 (85.1)	20.0 (68.0)	16.0 (60.8)	38.0 (100.4)
Mean daily maximum °C (°F)	6.3 (43.3)	7.6 (45.7)	11.8 (53.2)	14.2 (57.6)	18.9 (66.0)	20.9 (69.6)	24.7 (76.5)	25.0 (77.0)	20.5 (68.9)	15.8 (60.4)	9.9 (49.8)	7.3 (45.1)	15.3 (59.5)
Daily mean °C (°F)	3.7 (38.7)	4.2 (39.6)	7.5 (45.5)	9.5 (49.1)	13.7 (56.7)	15.9 (60.6)	18.9 (66.0)	18.8 (65.8)	15.4 (59.7)	11.7 (53.1)	6.6 (43.9)	4.7 (40.5)	10.9 (51.6)
Mean daily minimum °C (°F)	1.1 (34.0)	0.8 (33.4)	3.3 (37.9)	4.8 (40.6)	8.5 (47.3)	10.9 (51.6)	13.1 (55.6)	12.7 (54.9)	10.3 (50.5)	7.7 (45.9)	3.4 (38.1)	2.1 (35.8)	6.6 (43.9)
Record low °C (°F)	−18.5 (−1.3)	−13.0 (8.6)	−6.5 (20.3)	−4.0 (24.8)	0.0 (32.0)	2.0 (35.6)	5.0 (41.0)	4.0 (39.2)	3.0 (37.4)	−3.0 (26.6)	−10.0 (14.0)	−12.5 (9.5)	−18.5 (−1.3)
Average precipitation mm (inches)	52.2 (2.06)	44.4 (1.75)	46.7 (1.84)	49.7 (1.96)	60.5 (2.38)	49.2 (1.94)	57.9 (2.28)	47.7 (1.88)	49.9 (1.96)	60.1 (2.37)	56.8 (2.24)	59.6 (2.35)	634.7 (24.99)
Average precipitation days (≥ 1.0 mm)	10.6	9.6	10.0	9.3	9.9	7.8	7.8	6.9	7.9	9.8	10.3	10.8	110.7
Source: Météo-France

== See also ==
- Communes of the Essonne department
