= Marolles-en-Beauce =

Commune in Île-de-France, France

- Commune
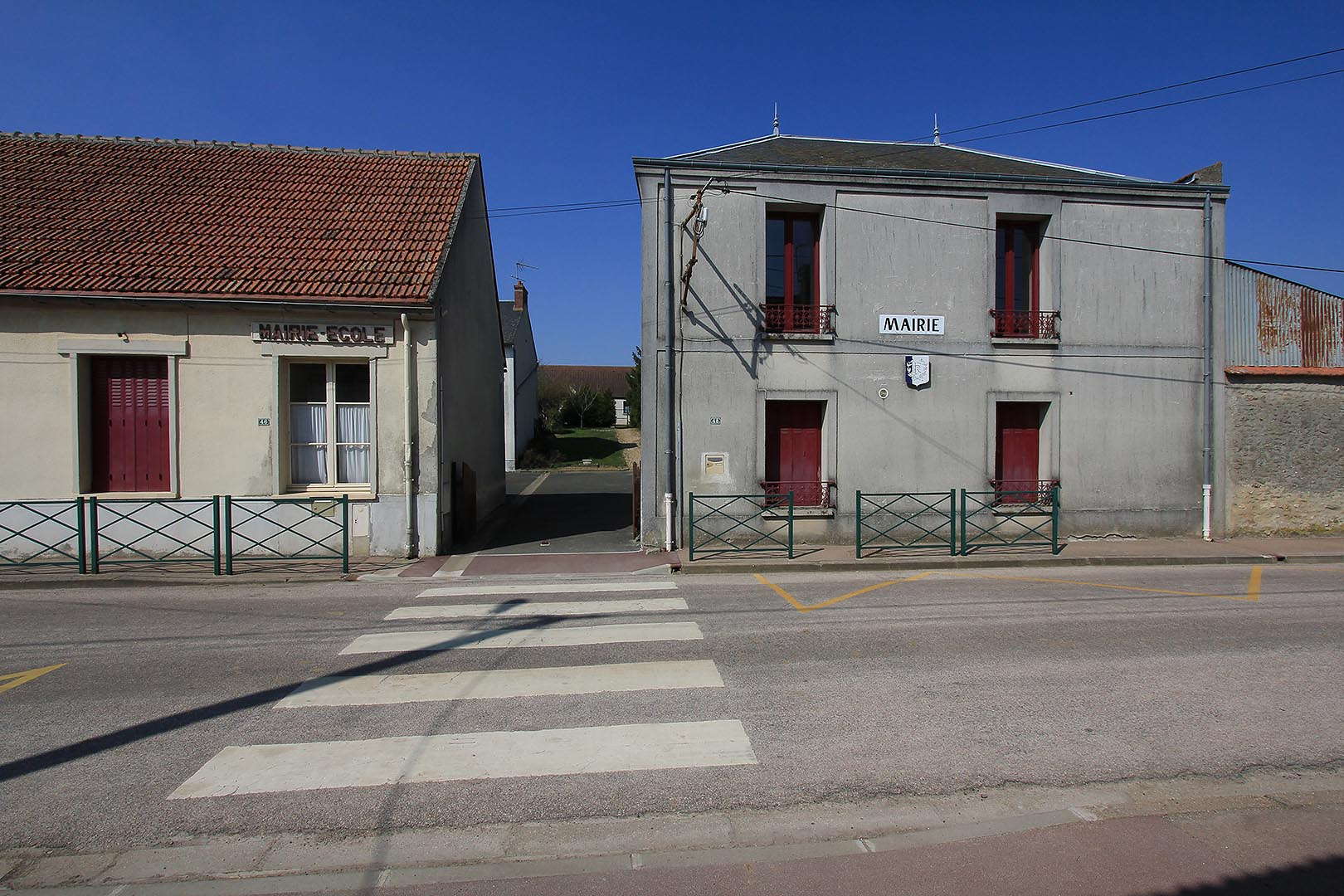
- The town hall in Marolles-en-Beauce
- Location of Marolles-en-Beauce
- Location within France Location within Île-de-France (region)
- Coordinates: 48°22′29″N 2°12′07″E
- Country: France
- Region: Île-de-France
- Department: Essonne
- Arrondissement: Étampes
- Canton: Étampes
- Intercommunality: CA Étampois Sud Essonne

Government
  - Mayor (2020–2026): Alain Perdigeon
- Area^{1}: 6.00 km^{2} (2.32 sq mi)
- Highest elevation: 149 m (489 ft)
- Lowest elevation: 123 m (404 ft)
- Population (2023): 237
  - Density: 39.5/km^{2} (102/sq mi)
- Time zone: UTC+01:00 (CET)
  - Summer (DST): UTC+02:00 (CEST)
- INSEE/Postal code: 91374 /91150
- ^{1} French Land Register data, which excludes lakes, ponds, glaciers > 1 km^{2} (0.386 sq mi or 247 acres) and river estuaries.

Marolles-en-Beauce (French pronunciation: [maʁɔl ɑ̃ bos], literally Marolles in Beauce) is a commune in the Essonne department in Île-de-France in northern France. It is 55 kilometres from the southwest end of Paris.

Inhabitants of Marolles-en-Beauce are known as Marollais.

== See also ==
- Communes of the Essonne department
