= Chalo-Saint-Mars =

Commune in Île-de-France, France

- Commune
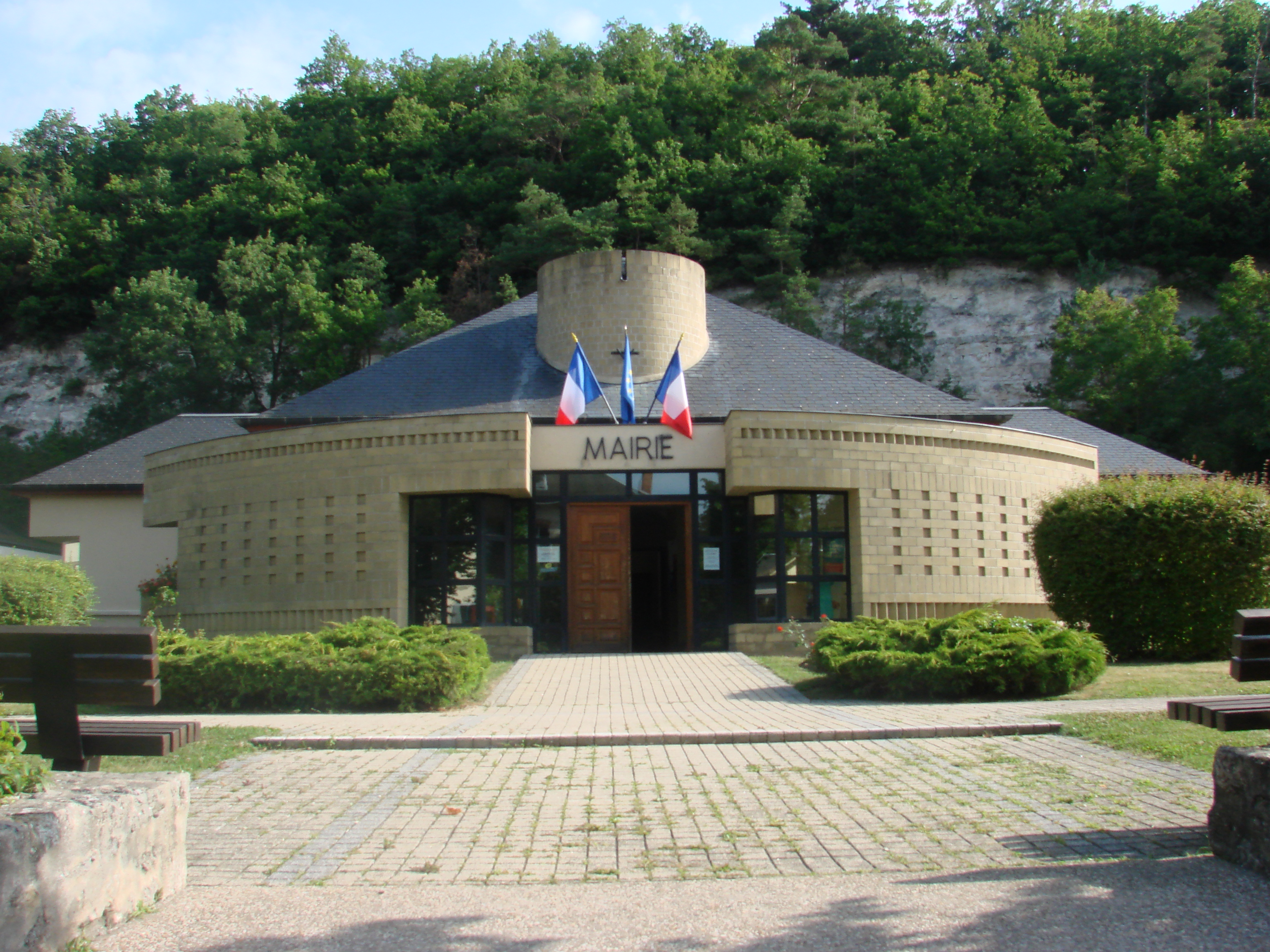
- The town hall of Chalo-Saint-Mars

- Coat of arms
- Location of Chalo-Saint-Mars
- Location within France Location within Île-de-France (region)
- Coordinates: 48°25′36″N 2°04′01″E
- Country: France
- Region: Île-de-France
- Department: Essonne
- Arrondissement: Étampes
- Canton: Étampes
- Intercommunality: CA Étampois Sud Essonne

Government
  - Mayor (2020–2026): Xavier Guiomar
- Area^{1}: 28.67 km^{2} (11.07 sq mi)
- Highest elevation: 152 m (499 ft)
- Lowest elevation: 81 m (266 ft)
- Population (2023): 1,053
  - Density: 36.73/km^{2} (95.13/sq mi)
- Time zone: UTC+01:00 (CET)
  - Summer (DST): UTC+02:00 (CEST)
- INSEE/Postal code: 91130 /91780
- ^{1} French Land Register data, which excludes lakes, ponds, glaciers > 1 km^{2} (0.386 sq mi or 247 acres) and river estuaries.

Chalo-Saint-Mars (French pronunciation: [ʃalo sɛ̃ maʁ]) is a commune in the Essonne department in Île-de-France in northern France.

Inhabitants of Chalo-Saint-Mars are known as Chaloins.

== See also ==
- Communes of the Essonne department
