= Bois-Herpin =

Commune in Île-de-France, France

- Commune
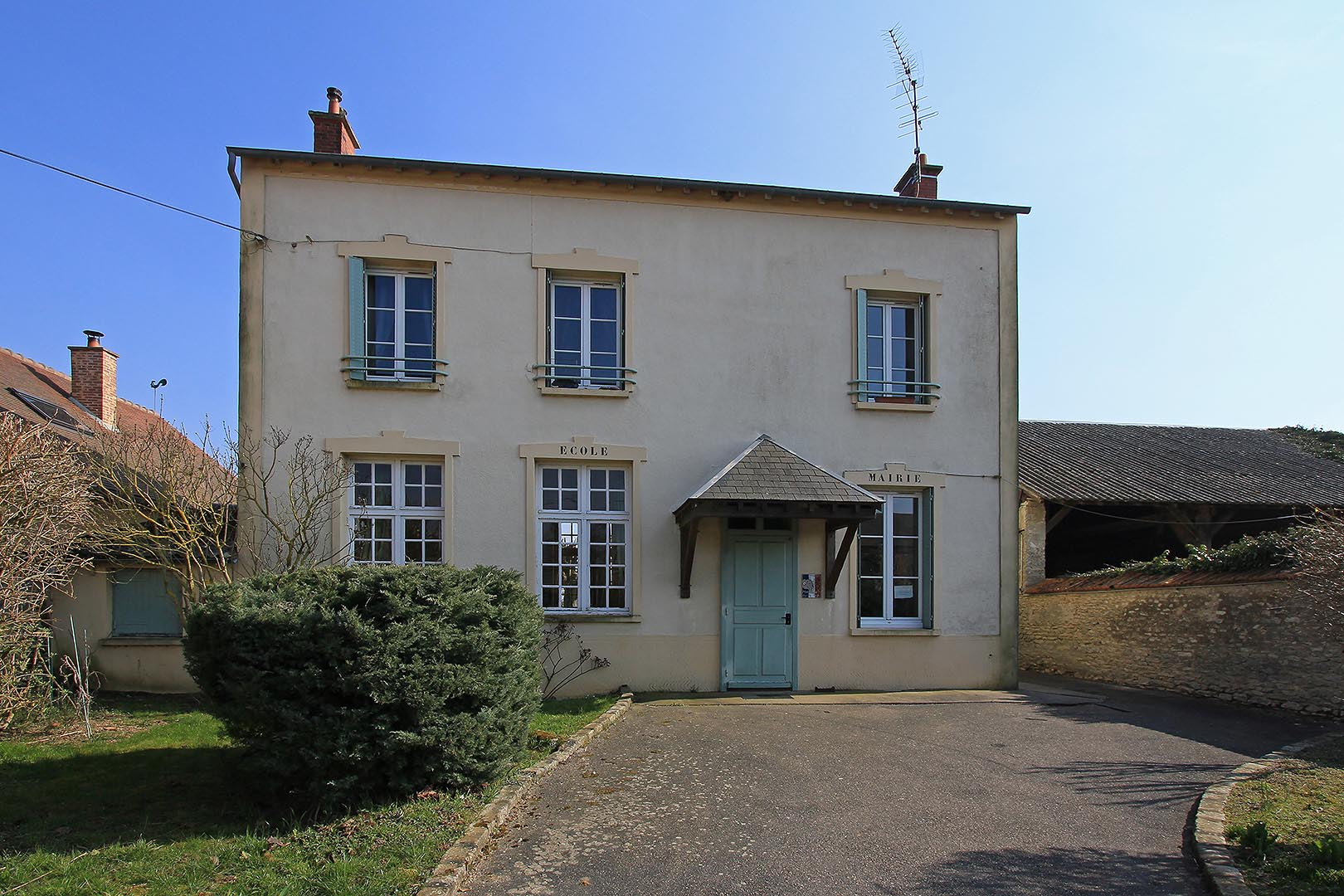
- The town hall of Bois-Herpin
- Location of Bois-Herpin
- Location within France Location within Île-de-France (region)
- Coordinates: 48°22′08″N 2°13′54″E
- Country: France
- Region: Île-de-France
- Department: Essonne
- Arrondissement: Étampes
- Canton: Étampes
- Intercommunality: CA Étampois Sud Essonne

Government
  - Mayor (2020–2026): Evelyne Thouément
- Area^{1}: 3.89 km^{2} (1.50 sq mi)
- Highest elevation: 142 m (466 ft)
- Lowest elevation: 94 m (308 ft)
- Population (2023): 81
  - Density: 21/km^{2} (54/sq mi)
- Time zone: UTC+01:00 (CET)
  - Summer (DST): UTC+02:00 (CEST)
- INSEE/Postal code: 91075 /91150
- ^{1} French Land Register data, which excludes lakes, ponds, glaciers > 1 km^{2} (0.386 sq mi or 247 acres) and river estuaries.

Bois-Herpin (French pronunciation: [bwa ɛʁpɛ̃]) is a commune in the Essonne department in Île-de-France in northern France.

Inhabitants of Bois-Herpin are known as Bois-Herpinois.

== See also ==
- Communes of the Essonne department
