= Boutervilliers =

Commune in Île-de-France, France

- Commune
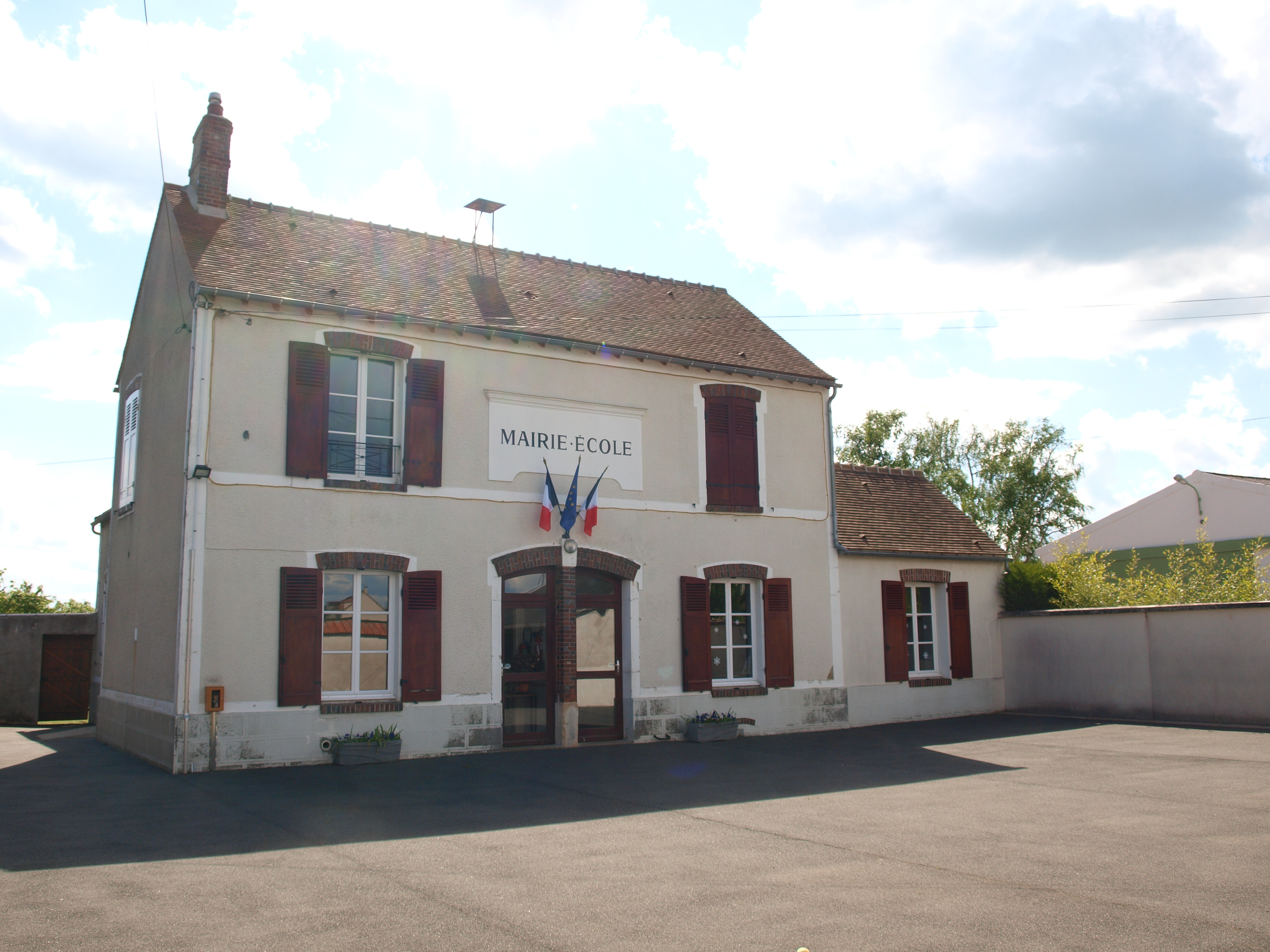
- The town hall of Boutervilliers

- Coat of arms
- Location of Boutervilliers
- Location within France Location within Île-de-France (region)
- Coordinates: 48°27′12″N 2°03′15″E
- Country: France
- Region: Île-de-France
- Department: Essonne
- Arrondissement: Étampes
- Canton: Étampes
- Intercommunality: CA Étampois Sud Essonne

Government
  - Mayor (2020–2026): Marc Herreman
- Area^{1}: 7.01 km^{2} (2.71 sq mi)
- Highest elevation: 155 m (509 ft)
- Lowest elevation: 88 m (289 ft)
- Population (2023): 429
  - Density: 61.2/km^{2} (159/sq mi)
- Time zone: UTC+01:00 (CET)
  - Summer (DST): UTC+02:00 (CEST)
- INSEE/Postal code: 91098 /91150
- ^{1} French Land Register data, which excludes lakes, ponds, glaciers > 1 km^{2} (0.386 sq mi or 247 acres) and river estuaries.

Boutervilliers (French pronunciation: [butɛʁvilje]) is a commune in the Essonne department in Île-de-France in northern France.

Inhabitants of Boutervilliers are known as Boutervillierais in French.

== See also ==
- Communes of the Essonne department
