= Authon-la-Plaine =

Commune in Île-de-France, France

- Commune
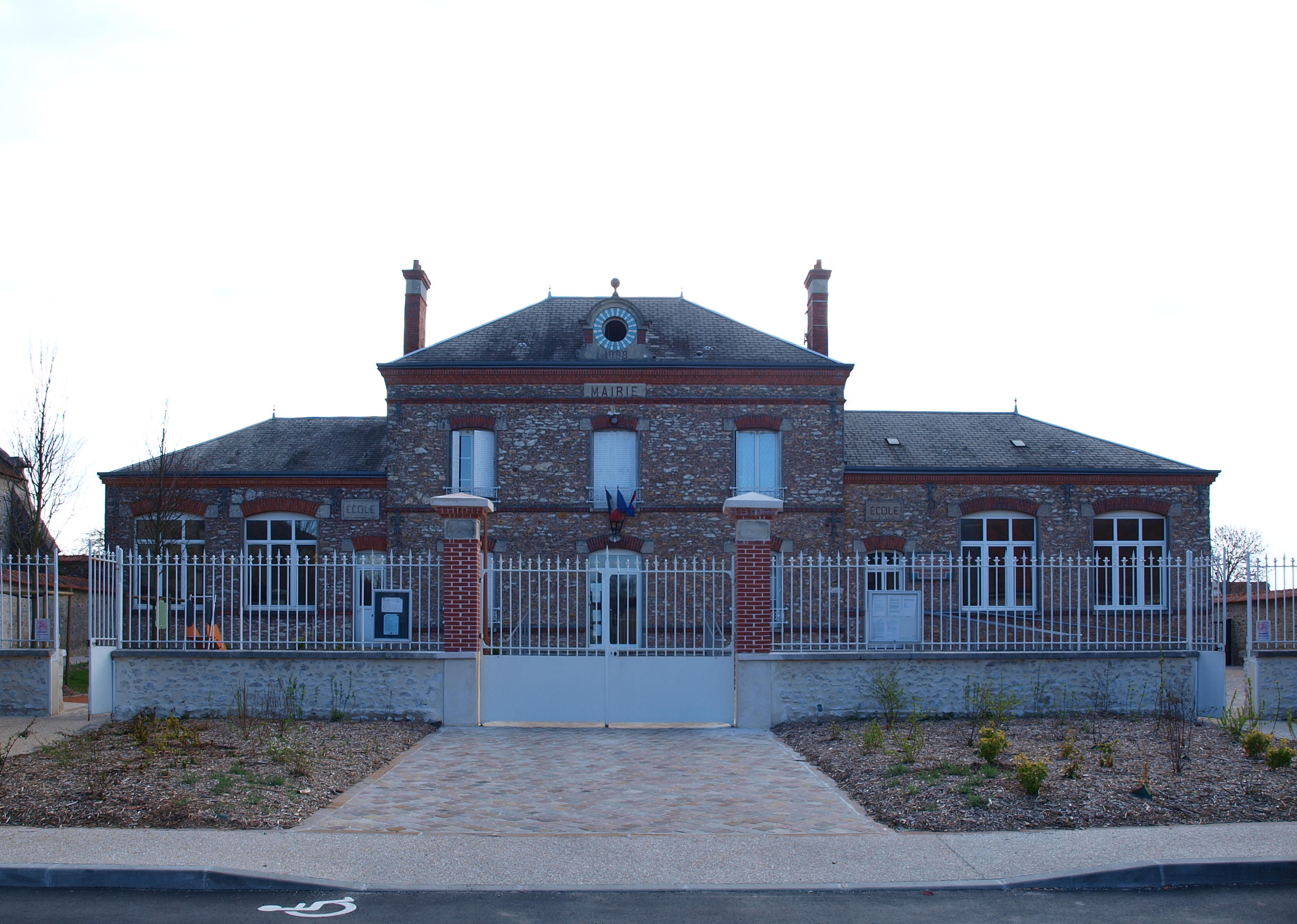
- The town hall of Authon-la-Plaine
- Location of Authon-la-Plaine
- Location within France Location within Île-de-France (region)
- Coordinates: 48°27′02″N 1°57′24″E
- Country: France
- Region: Île-de-France
- Department: Essonne
- Arrondissement: Étampes
- Canton: Étampes
- Intercommunality: CA Étampois Sud Essonne

Government
  - Mayor (2020–2026): Nicolas André
- Area^{1}: 10.59 km^{2} (4.09 sq mi)
- Highest elevation: 157 m (515 ft)
- Lowest elevation: 147 m (482 ft)
- Population (2023): 368
  - Density: 34.7/km^{2} (90.0/sq mi)
- Time zone: UTC+01:00 (CET)
  - Summer (DST): UTC+02:00 (CEST)
- INSEE/Postal code: 91035 /91410
- ^{1} French Land Register data, which excludes lakes, ponds, glaciers > 1 km^{2} (0.386 sq mi or 247 acres) and river estuaries.

Authon-la-Plaine (French pronunciation: [otɔ̃ la plɛn]) is a commune in the Essonne department in Île-de-France in northern France.

Inhabitants are known as Authonais in French.

== See also ==
- Communes of the Essonne department
