= Mespuits =

Commune in Île-de-France, France

- Commune
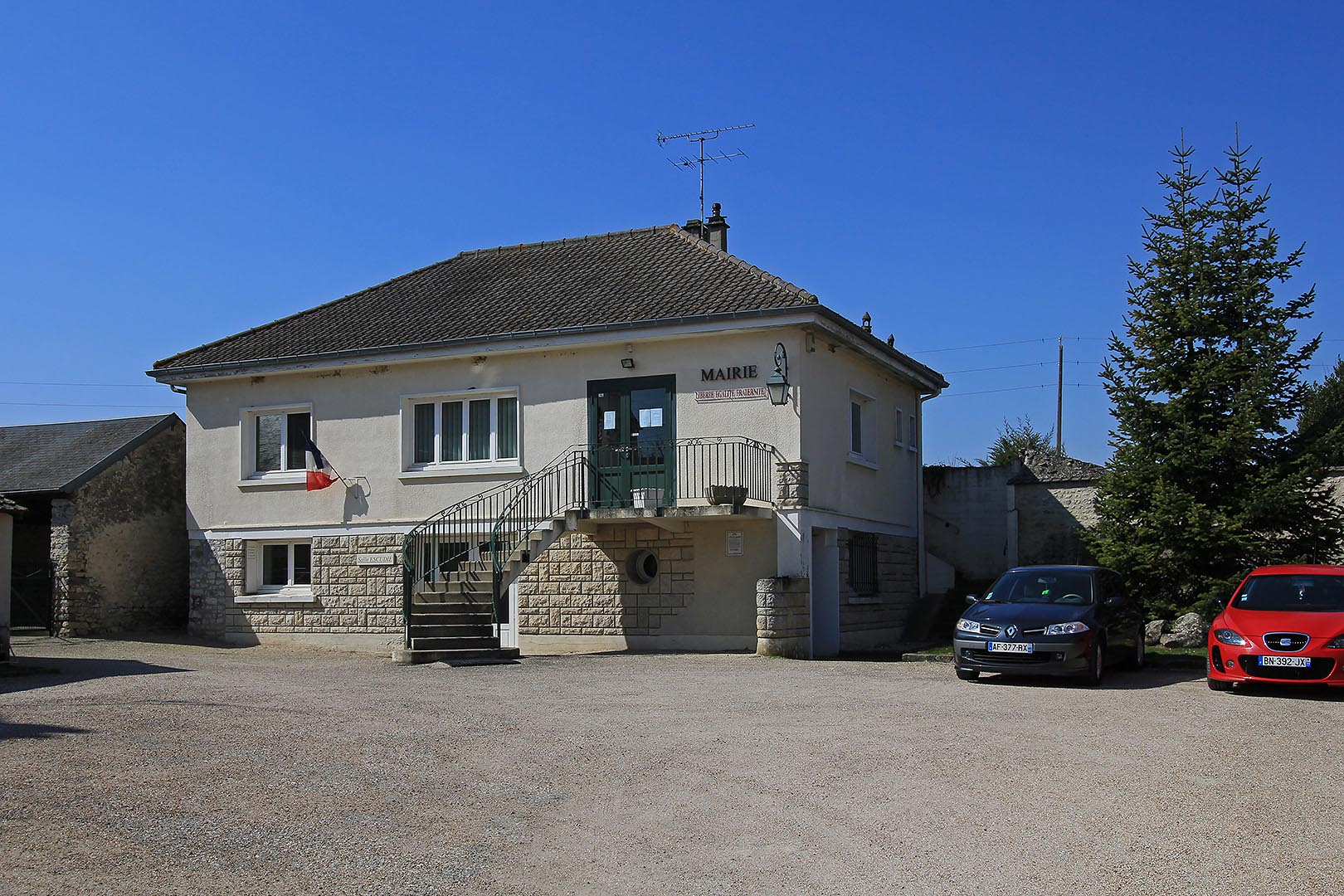
- The town hall in Mespuits

- Coat of arms
- Location of Mespuits
- Location within France Location within Île-de-France (region)
- Coordinates: 48°21′22″N 2°16′18″E
- Country: France
- Region: Île-de-France
- Department: Essonne
- Arrondissement: Étampes
- Canton: Étampes
- Intercommunality: CA Étampois Sud Essonne

Government
  - Mayor (2024–2026): Laurence Bureau
- Area^{1}: 9.95 km^{2} (3.84 sq mi)
- Highest elevation: 145 m (476 ft)
- Lowest elevation: 93 m (305 ft)
- Population (2023): 184
  - Density: 18.5/km^{2} (47.9/sq mi)
- Time zone: UTC+01:00 (CET)
  - Summer (DST): UTC+02:00 (CEST)
- INSEE/Postal code: 91399 /91150
- ^{1} French Land Register data, which excludes lakes, ponds, glaciers > 1 km^{2} (0.386 sq mi or 247 acres) and river estuaries.

Mespuits (French pronunciation: [mɛpɥi]) is a commune in the Essonne department in Île-de-France in northern France.

Inhabitants of Mespuits are known as Mespuitsiens.

== See also ==
- Communes of the Essonne department
