= Saint-Escobille =

Commune in Île-de-France, France

- Commune
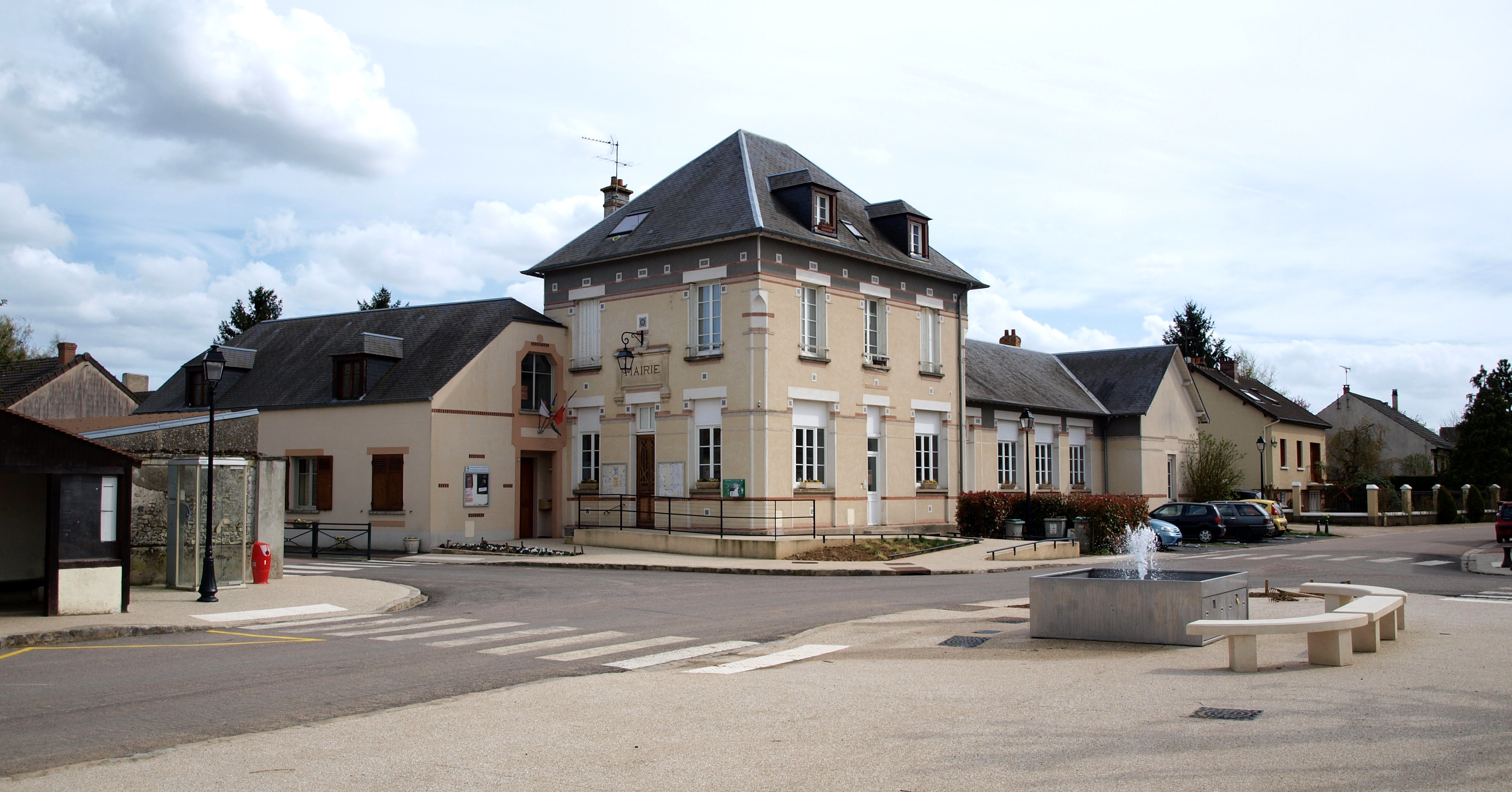
- The town hall in Saint-Escobille

- Coat of arms
- Location of Saint-Escobille
- Location within France Location within Île-de-France (region)
- Coordinates: 48°25′46″N 1°58′02″E
- Country: France
- Region: Île-de-France
- Department: Essonne
- Arrondissement: Étampes
- Canton: Étampes
- Intercommunality: CA Étampois Sud Essonne

Government
  - Mayor (2020–2026): Yves Villate
- Area^{1}: 12.00 km^{2} (4.63 sq mi)
- Highest elevation: 156 m (512 ft)
- Lowest elevation: 140 m (460 ft)
- Population (2023): 454
  - Density: 37.8/km^{2} (98.0/sq mi)
- Time zone: UTC+01:00 (CET)
  - Summer (DST): UTC+02:00 (CEST)
- INSEE/Postal code: 91547 /91410
- ^{1} French Land Register data, which excludes lakes, ponds, glaciers > 1 km^{2} (0.386 sq mi or 247 acres) and river estuaries.

Saint-Escobille (French pronunciation: [sɛ̃.t‿ɛskɔbij]) is a commune in the Essonne department in Île-de-France in northern France.

Inhabitants of Saint-Escobille are known as Saint-Escobillois.

== See also ==
- Communes of the Essonne department
