= La Forêt-Sainte-Croix =

Commune in Île-de-France, France

- Commune
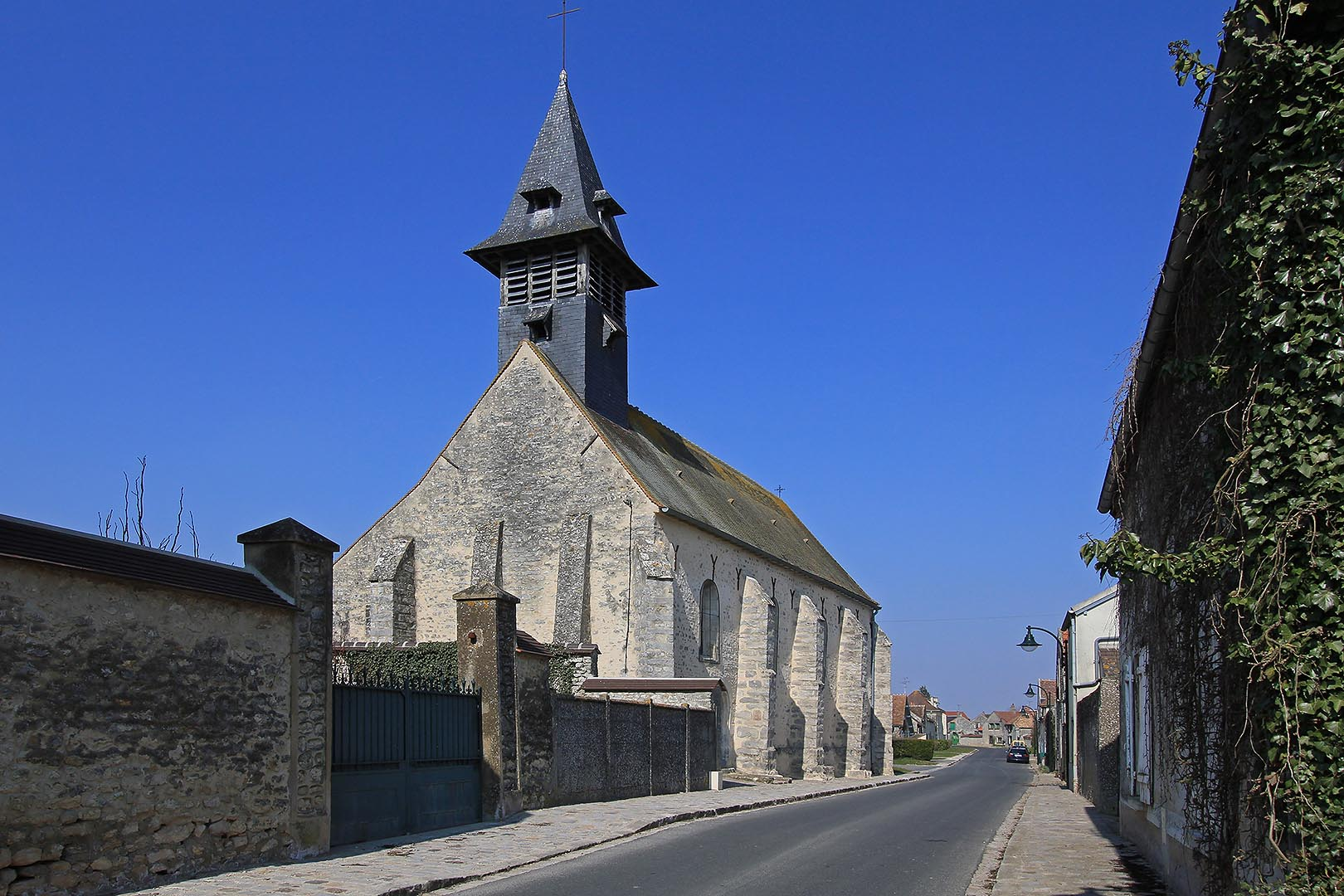
- The church in La Forêt-Sainte-Croix, in 2013
- Location of La Forêt-Sainte-Croix
- Location within France Location within Île-de-France (region)
- Coordinates: 48°22′58″N 2°13′45″E
- Country: France
- Region: Île-de-France
- Department: Essonne
- Arrondissement: Étampes
- Canton: Étampes
- Intercommunality: CA Étampois Sud Essonne

Government
  - Mayor (2020–2026): Guy Crosnier
- Area^{1}: 5.36 km^{2} (2.07 sq mi)
- Highest elevation: 144 m (472 ft)
- Lowest elevation: 99 m (325 ft)
- Population (2023): 148
  - Density: 27.6/km^{2} (71.5/sq mi)
- Time zone: UTC+01:00 (CET)
  - Summer (DST): UTC+02:00 (CEST)
- INSEE/Postal code: 91248 /91150
- ^{1} French Land Register data, which excludes lakes, ponds, glaciers > 1 km^{2} (0.386 sq mi or 247 acres) and river estuaries.

La Forêt-Sainte-Croix (French pronunciation: [la fɔʁɛ sɛ̃t kʁwa]) is a commune in the Essonne department in Île-de-France which is in northern France.

Inhabitants of La Forêt-Sainte-Croix are known as Sylvaniens.

== See also ==
- Communes of the Essonne department
