= Brières-les-Scellés =

Commune in Île-de-France, France

- Commune
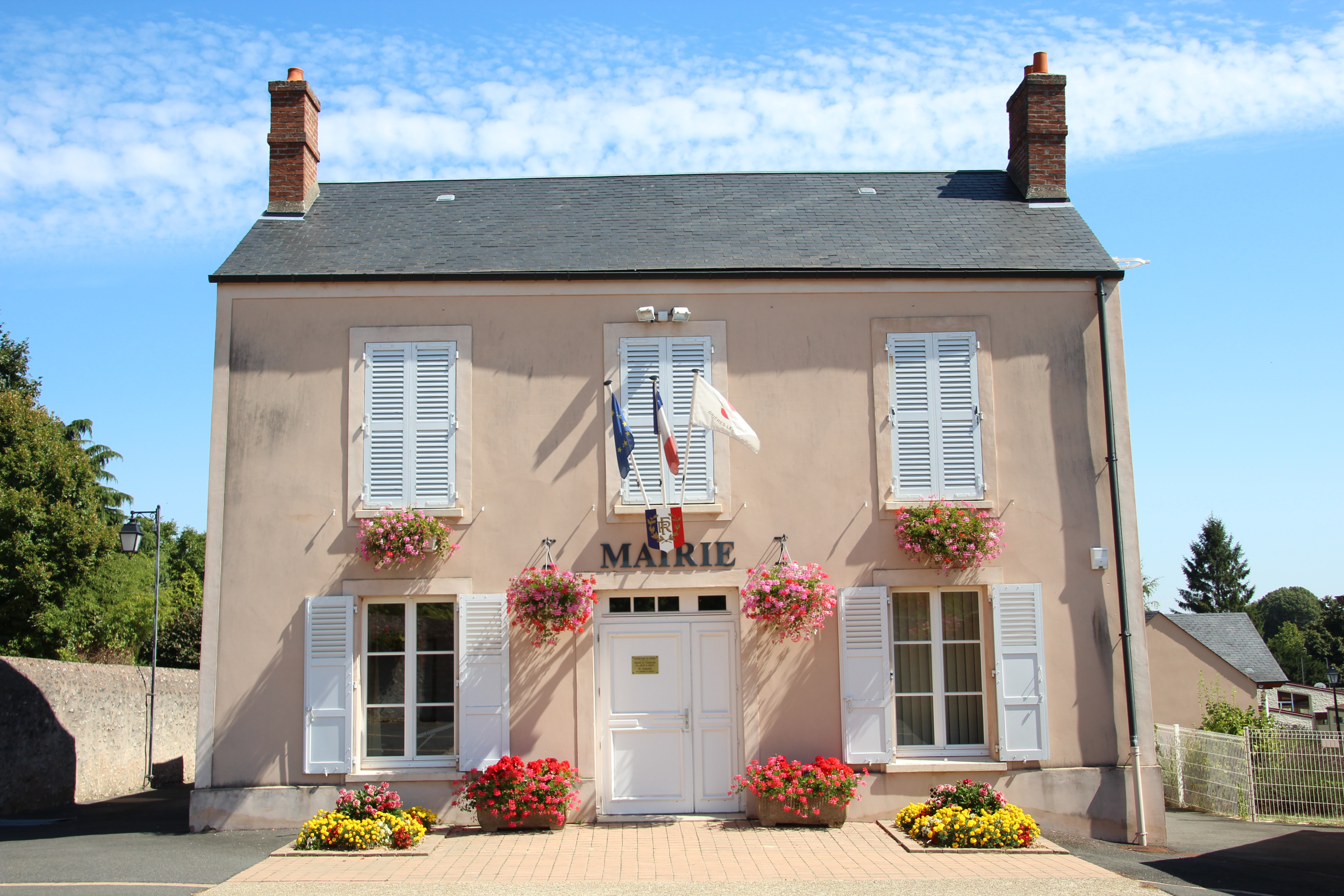
- The town hall of Brières-les-Scellés, in 2013

- Coat of arms
- Location of Brières-les-Scellés
- Location within France Location within Île-de-France (region)
- Coordinates: 48°27′28″N 2°08′19″E
- Country: France
- Region: Île-de-France
- Department: Essonne
- Arrondissement: Étampes
- Canton: Étampes
- Intercommunality: CA Étampois Sud Essonne

Government
  - Mayor (2020–2026): Michel Rouland
- Area^{1}: 8.65 km^{2} (3.34 sq mi)
- Highest elevation: 153 m (502 ft)
- Lowest elevation: 70 m (230 ft)
- Population (2023): 1,186
  - Density: 137/km^{2} (355/sq mi)
- Time zone: UTC+01:00 (CET)
  - Summer (DST): UTC+02:00 (CEST)
- INSEE/Postal code: 91109 /91150
- ^{1} French Land Register data, which excludes lakes, ponds, glaciers > 1 km^{2} (0.386 sq mi or 247 acres) and river estuaries.

Brières-les-Scellés (French pronunciation: [bʁijɛʁ le sele]) is a commune in the Essonne department in Île-de-France in northern France.

Inhabitants of Brières-les-Scellés are known as Briolins.

== See also ==
- Communes of the Essonne department
