= Mérobert =

Commune in Île-de-France, France

- Commune
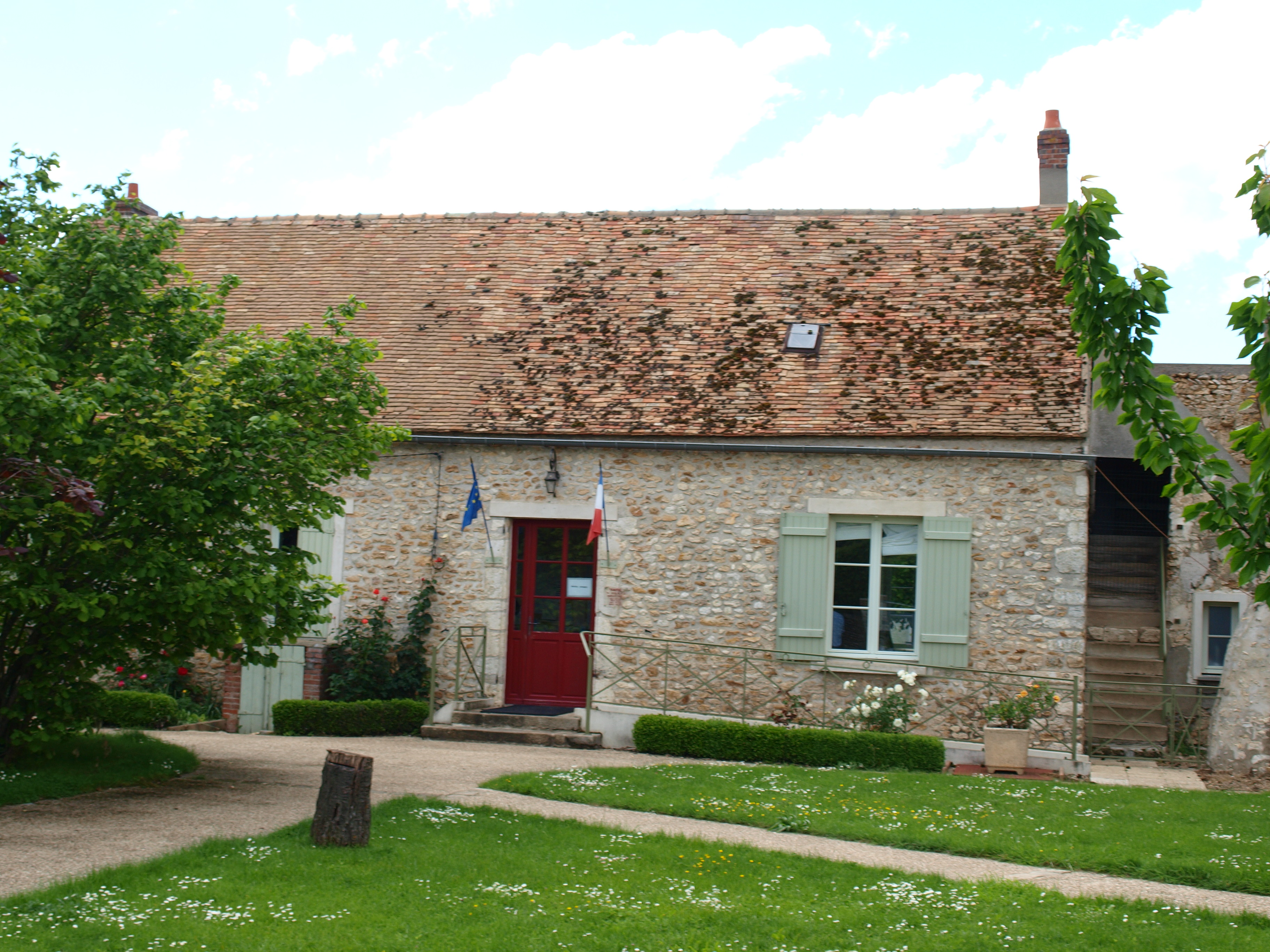
- The town hall in Mérobert

- Coat of arms
- Location of Mérobert
- Location within France Location within Île-de-France (region)
- Coordinates: 48°24′59″N 2°00′23″E
- Country: France
- Region: Île-de-France
- Department: Essonne
- Arrondissement: Étampes
- Canton: Étampes
- Intercommunality: CA Étampois Sud Essonne

Government
  - Mayor (2020–2026): Alain Martin
- Area^{1}: 10.71 km^{2} (4.14 sq mi)
- Highest elevation: 154 m (505 ft)
- Lowest elevation: 128 m (420 ft)
- Population (2023): 635
  - Density: 59.3/km^{2} (154/sq mi)
- Time zone: UTC+01:00 (CET)
  - Summer (DST): UTC+02:00 (CEST)
- INSEE/Postal code: 91393 /91780
- ^{1} French Land Register data, which excludes lakes, ponds, glaciers > 1 km^{2} (0.386 sq mi or 247 acres) and river estuaries.

Mérobert (French pronunciation: [meʁɔbɛʁ]) is a commune in the Essonne department in Île-de-France in northern France.

Inhabitants of Mérobert are known as Mérobertois.

== See also ==
- Communes of the Essonne department
