= Roinvilliers =

Commune in Île-de-France, France

- Commune
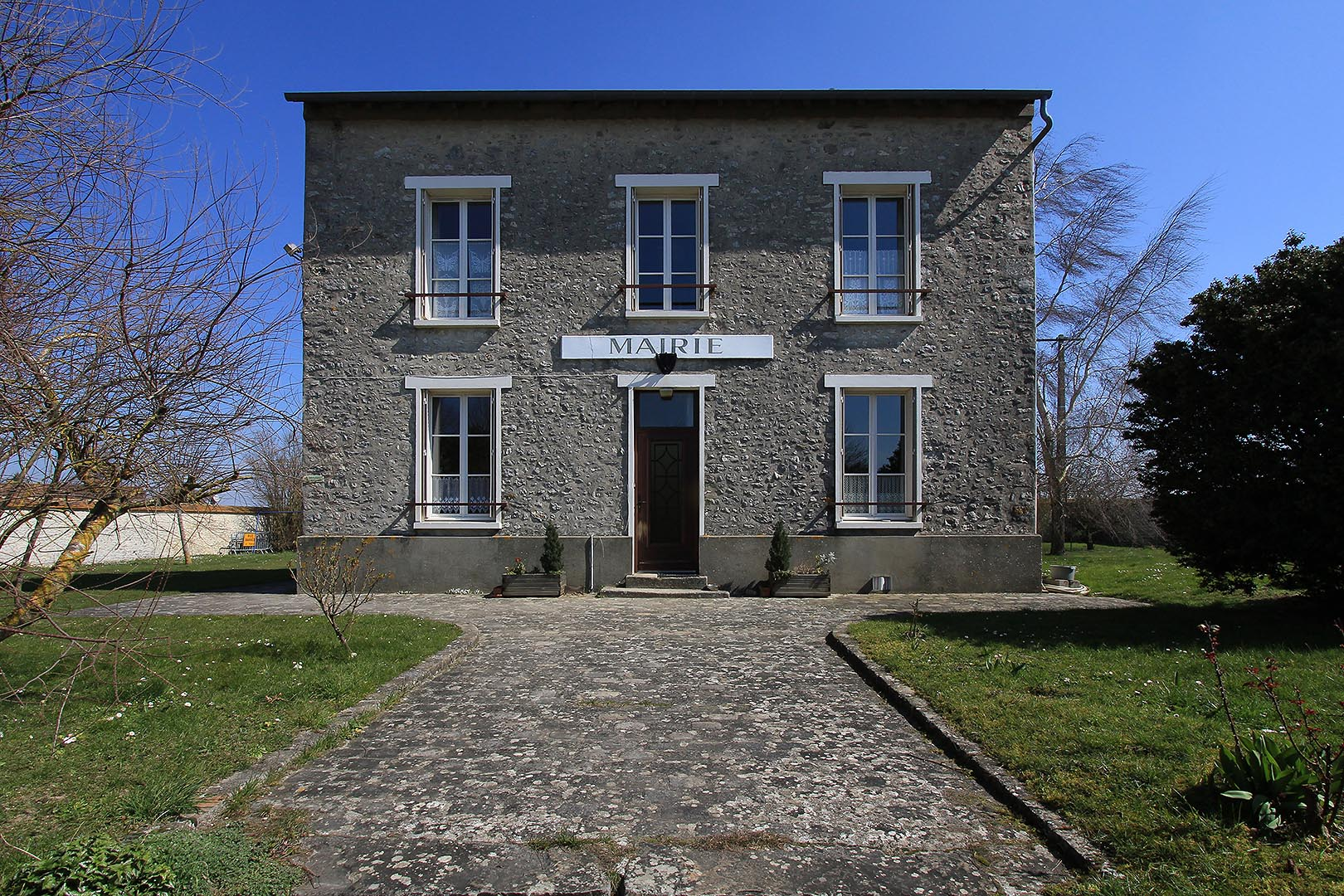
- The town hall in Roinvilliers
- Location of Roinvilliers
- Location within France Location within Île-de-France (region)
- Coordinates: 48°21′22″N 2°14′25″E
- Country: France
- Region: Île-de-France
- Department: Essonne
- Arrondissement: Étampes
- Canton: Étampes
- Intercommunality: CA Étampois Sud Essonne

Government
  - Mayor (2020–2026): Huguette Denis
- Area^{1}: 7.16 km^{2} (2.76 sq mi)
- Highest elevation: 142 m (466 ft)
- Lowest elevation: 118 m (387 ft)
- Population (2023): 112
  - Density: 15.6/km^{2} (40.5/sq mi)
- Time zone: UTC+01:00 (CET)
  - Summer (DST): UTC+02:00 (CEST)
- INSEE/Postal code: 91526 /91150
- ^{1} French Land Register data, which excludes lakes, ponds, glaciers > 1 km^{2} (0.386 sq mi or 247 acres) and river estuaries.

Roinvilliers (French pronunciation: [ʁwɛ̃vilje]) is a commune in the Essonne department in Île-de-France in northern France.

Inhabitants of Roinvilliers are known as Roinvilliérains.

== See also ==
- Communes of the Essonne department
