= Chalou-Moulineux =

Commune in Île-de-France, France

- Commune
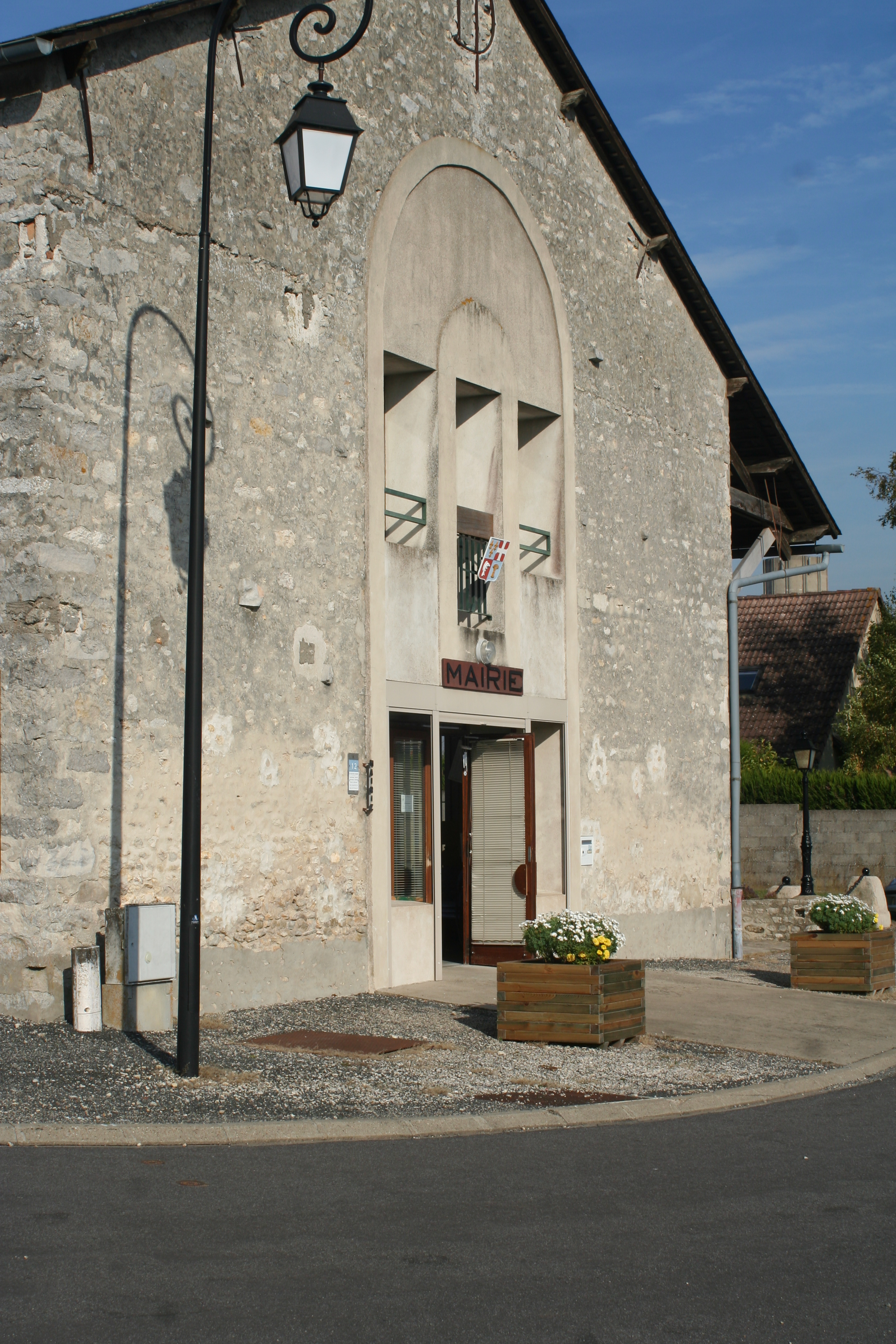
- The town hall of Chalou-Moulineux

- Coat of arms
- Location of Chalou-Moulineux
- Location within France Location within Île-de-France (region)
- Coordinates: 48°23′02″N 2°01′20″E
- Country: France
- Region: Île-de-France
- Department: Essonne
- Arrondissement: Étampes
- Canton: Étampes
- Intercommunality: CA Étampois Sud Essonne

Government
  - Mayor (2020–2026): Geneviève Mennelet
- Area^{1}: 10.47 km^{2} (4.04 sq mi)
- Highest elevation: 148 m (486 ft)
- Lowest elevation: 96 m (315 ft)
- Population (2023): 373
  - Density: 35.6/km^{2} (92.3/sq mi)
- Time zone: UTC+01:00 (CET)
  - Summer (DST): UTC+02:00 (CEST)
- INSEE/Postal code: 91131 /91740
- ^{1} French Land Register data, which excludes lakes, ponds, glaciers > 1 km^{2} (0.386 sq mi or 247 acres) and river estuaries.

Chalou-Moulineux (French pronunciation: [ʃalu mulinø]) is a commune in the Essonne department in Île-de-France in northern France.

Inhabitants of Chalou-Moulineux are known as Calo-Moulinotins.

== See also ==
- Communes of the Essonne department
