= Puiselet-le-Marais =

Commune in Île-de-France, France

- Commune
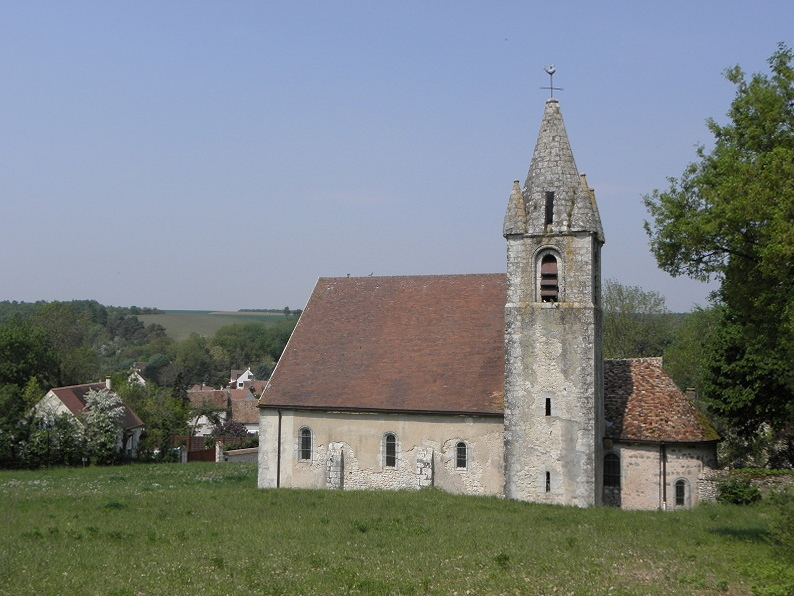
- The church of Saint-Martin, in Puiselet-le-Marais

- Coat of arms
- Location of Puiselet-le-Marais
- Location within France Location within Île-de-France (region)
- Coordinates: 48°24′24″N 2°15′51″E
- Country: France
- Region: Île-de-France
- Department: Essonne
- Arrondissement: Étampes
- Canton: Étampes
- Intercommunality: CA Étampois Sud Essonne

Government
  - Mayor (2020–2026): Fabien Bidault
- Area^{1}: 11.27 km^{2} (4.35 sq mi)
- Highest elevation: 143 m (469 ft)
- Lowest elevation: 70 m (230 ft)
- Population (2023): 261
  - Density: 23.2/km^{2} (60.0/sq mi)
- Time zone: UTC+01:00 (CET)
  - Summer (DST): UTC+02:00 (CEST)
- INSEE/Postal code: 91508 /91150
- ^{1} French Land Register data, which excludes lakes, ponds, glaciers > 1 km^{2} (0.386 sq mi or 247 acres) and river estuaries.

Puiselet-le-Marais (French pronunciation: [pɥizlɛ lə maʁɛ]) is a commune in the Essonne department in Île-de-France in northern France.

Inhabitants of Puiselet-le-Marais are known as Pirlotchets.

== See also ==
- Communes of the Essonne department
