= Blandy, Essonne =

Commune in Île-de-France, France

Blandy
- Commune
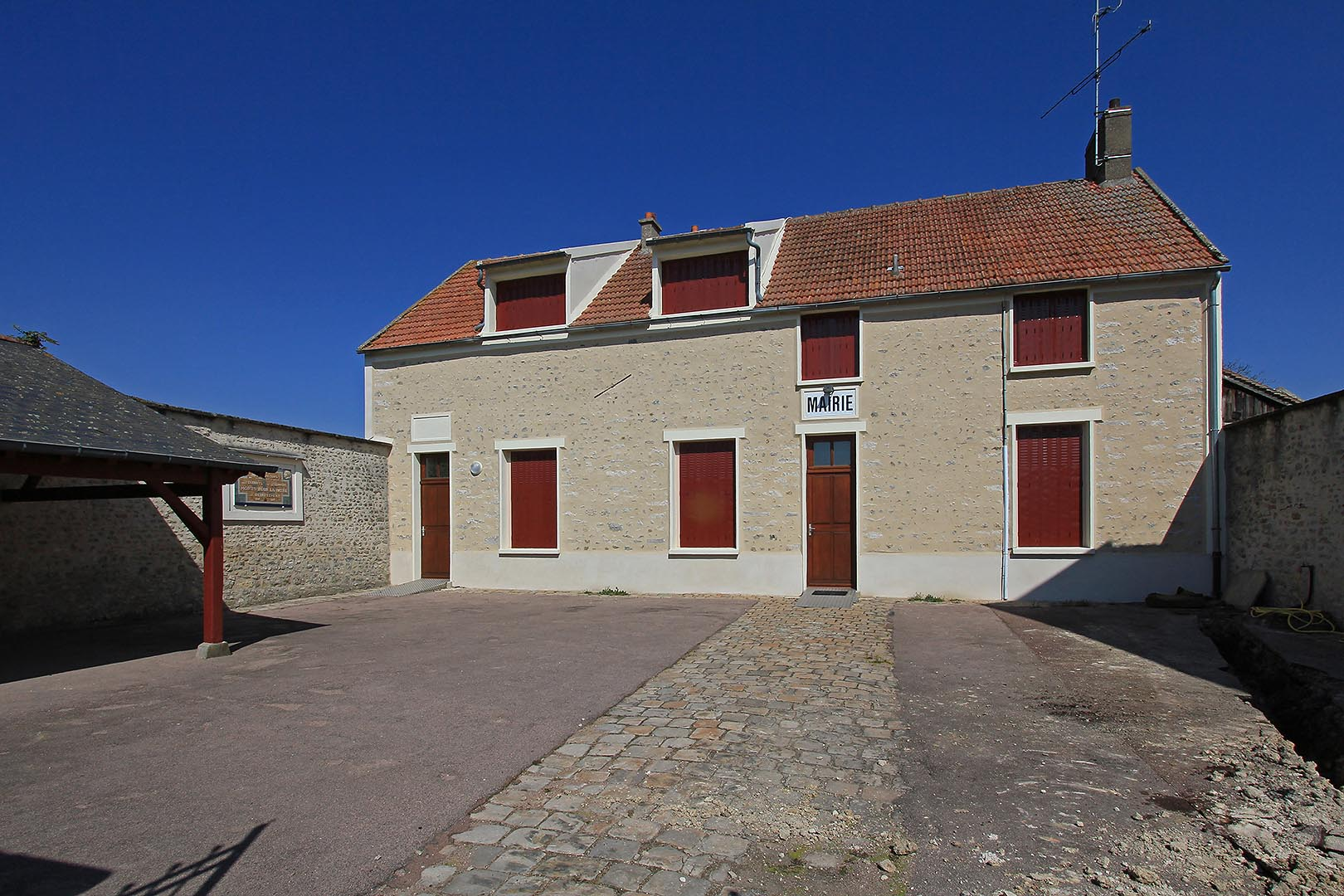
- The town hall of Blandy
- Location of Blandy
- Location within France Location within Île-de-France (region)
- Coordinates: 48°18′48″N 2°15′26″E
- Country: France
- Region: Île-de-France
- Department: Essonne
- Arrondissement: Étampes
- Canton: Étampes
- Intercommunality: CA Étampois Sud Essonne

Government
  - Mayor (2024–2026): Danielle Benech
- Area^{1}: 7.91 km^{2} (3.05 sq mi)
- Highest elevation: 147 m (482 ft)
- Lowest elevation: 125 m (410 ft)
- Population (2023): 111
  - Density: 14.0/km^{2} (36.3/sq mi)
- Time zone: UTC+01:00 (CET)
  - Summer (DST): UTC+02:00 (CEST)
- INSEE/Postal code: 91067 /91150
- ^{1} French Land Register data, which excludes lakes, ponds, glaciers > 1 km^{2} (0.386 sq mi or 247 acres) and river estuaries.

Blandy (French pronunciation: [blɑ̃di]) is a commune in the Essonne department in Île-de-France in northern France.

Inhabitants of Blandy are known as Blandois.

== See also ==
- Communes of the Essonne department
