= Canton of Étampes =

Coordinates: 48.43°N 2.16°E

The canton of Étampes is an administrative division of the Essonne department, Île-de-France region, northern France. Its borders were modified at the French canton reorganisation which came into effect in March 2015. Its seat is in Étampes.

It consists of the following communes:

1. Abbéville-la-Rivière
2. Angerville
3. Arrancourt
4. Authon-la-Plaine
5. Auvers-Saint-Georges
6. Blandy
7. Bois-Herpin
8. Boissy-la-Rivière
9. Boissy-le-Cutté
10. Boissy-le-Sec
11. Boutervilliers
12. Bouville
13. Brières-les-Scellés
14. Brouy
15. Cerny
16. Chalo-Saint-Mars
17. Chalou-Moulineux
18. Champmotteux
19. Chatignonville
20. Congerville-Thionville
21. D'Huison-Longueville
22. Étampes
23. Fontaine-la-Rivière
24. La Forêt-Sainte-Croix
25. Guillerval
26. Marolles-en-Beauce
27. Le Mérévillois
28. Mérobert
29. Mespuits
30. Monnerville
31. Morigny-Champigny
32. Ormoy-la-Rivière
33. Orveau
34. Plessis-Saint-Benoist
35. Puiselet-le-Marais
36. Pussay
37. Roinvilliers
38. Saclas
39. Saint-Cyr-la-Rivière
40. Saint-Escobille
41. Saint-Hilaire
42. Valpuiseaux
43. Vayres-sur-Essonne
44. Villeneuve-sur-Auvers
