= Chatignonville =

Commune in Île-de-France, France

- Commune
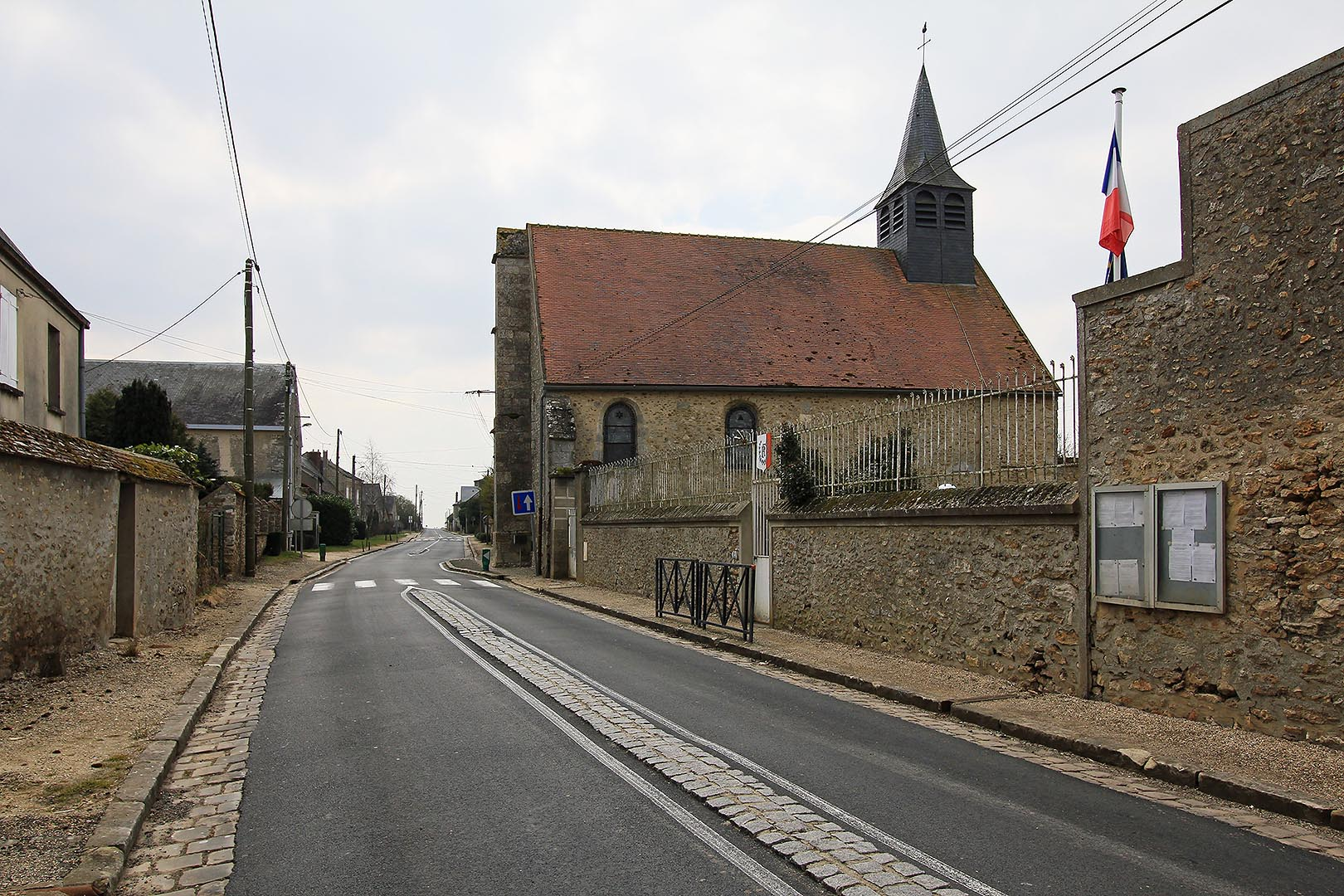
- The church in Chatignonville

- Coat of arms
- Location of Chatignonville
- Location within France Location within Île-de-France (region)
- Coordinates: 48°28′09″N 1°55′51″E
- Country: France
- Region: Île-de-France
- Department: Essonne
- Arrondissement: Étampes
- Canton: Étampes
- Intercommunality: CA Étampois Sud Essonne

Government
  - Mayor (2020–2026): Christian Thierry
- Area^{1}: 5.13 km^{2} (1.98 sq mi)
- Highest elevation: 159 m (522 ft)
- Lowest elevation: 152 m (499 ft)
- Population (2023): 72
  - Density: 14/km^{2} (36/sq mi)
- Time zone: UTC+01:00 (CET)
  - Summer (DST): UTC+02:00 (CEST)
- INSEE/Postal code: 91145 /91410
- ^{1} French Land Register data, which excludes lakes, ponds, glaciers > 1 km^{2} (0.386 sq mi or 247 acres) and river estuaries.

Chatignonville (French pronunciation: [ʃatiɲɔ̃vil]) is a commune in the Essonne department in Île-de-France in northern France.

Inhabitants of Chatignonville are known as Chatignonvillois.
