= Plessis-Saint-Benoist =

Commune in Île-de-France, France

- Commune
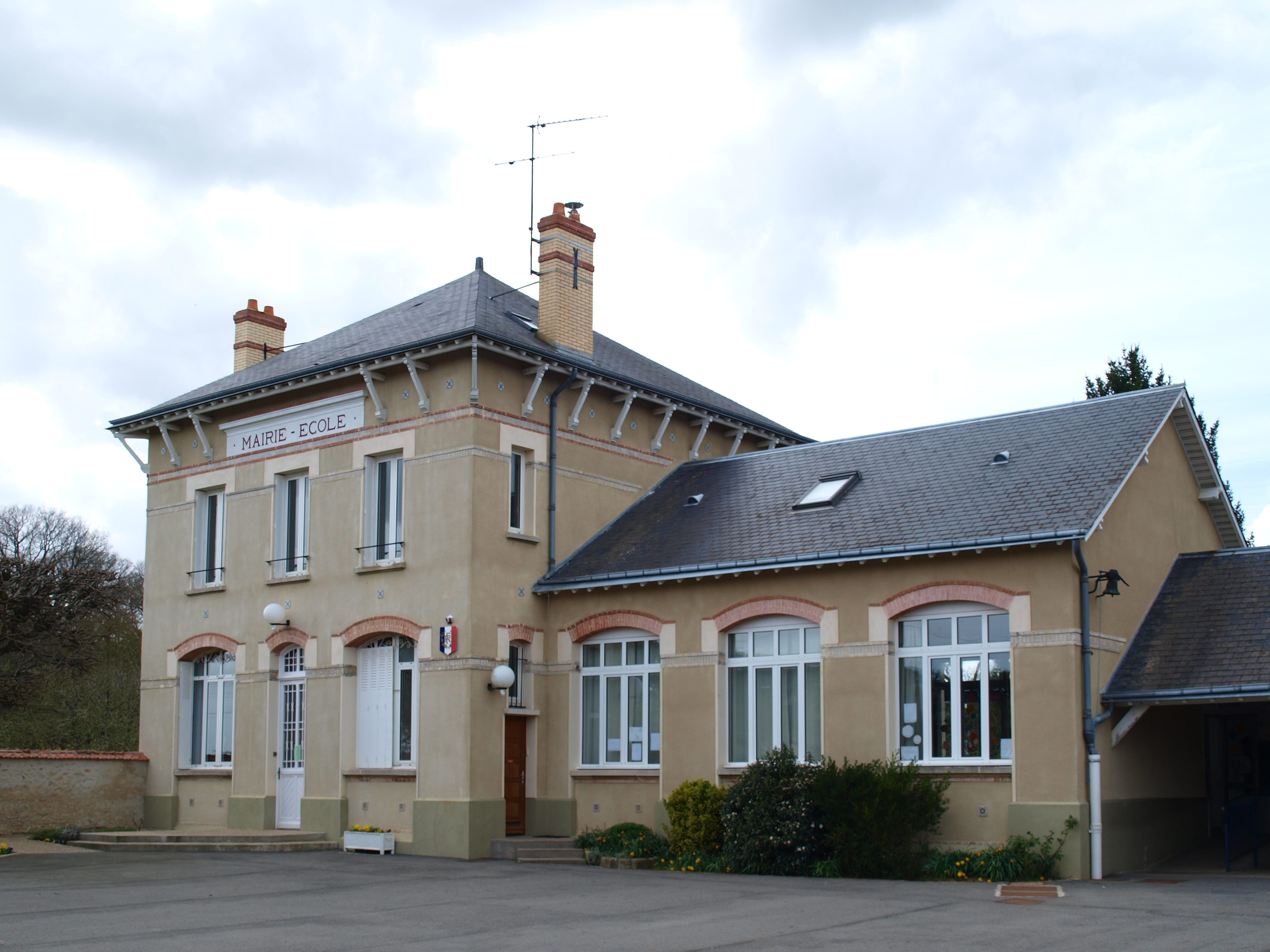
- The school and town hall in Plessis-Saint-Benoist
- Location of Plessis-Saint-Benoist
- Location within France Location within Île-de-France (region)
- Coordinates: 48°26′36″N 2°00′20″E
- Country: France
- Region: Île-de-France
- Department: Essonne
- Arrondissement: Étampes
- Canton: Étampes
- Intercommunality: CA Étampois Sud Essonne

Government
  - Mayor (2023–2026): Carole Missault
- Area^{1}: 9.16 km^{2} (3.54 sq mi)
- Highest elevation: 152 m (499 ft)
- Lowest elevation: 117 m (384 ft)
- Population (2023): 325
  - Density: 35.5/km^{2} (91.9/sq mi)
- Time zone: UTC+01:00 (CET)
  - Summer (DST): UTC+02:00 (CEST)
- INSEE/Postal code: 91495 /91410
- ^{1} French Land Register data, which excludes lakes, ponds, glaciers > 1 km^{2} (0.386 sq mi or 247 acres) and river estuaries.

Plessis-Saint-Benoist (French pronunciation: [plɛsi sɛ̃ bənwa]) is a commune in the Essonne department in Île-de-France in northern France.

Inhabitants of Plessis-Saint-Benoist are known as Benats.

== See also ==
- Communes of the Essonne department
