= Communauté d'agglomération Étampois Sud Essonne =

Étampois Sud Essonne
- Communauté d'agglomération
- Interactive map of Étampois Sud Essonne
- Coordinates: 48°25′N 02°10′E
- Country: France
- Region: Île-de-France
- Department: Essonne
- No. of communes: {{{nbcomm}}}
- Established: 2008
- Area: 482.5 km^{2} (186.3 sq mi)
- Population (2019): 54,673
  - Density: 113.3/km^{2} (293.5/sq mi)
- Website: www.etampois-sudessonne.fr

Communauté d'agglomération Grand Châtellerault is the communauté d'agglomération, an intercommunal structure, centred on the town of Étampes. It is located in the Essonne department, in the Île-de-France region, northern France. Created in 2008, its seat is in Étampes. Its area is 482.5 km^{2}. Its population was 54,673 in 2019, of which 25,629 in Étampes proper.

== Composition ==
The communauté d'agglomération consists of the following 37 communes:

1. Abbéville-la-Rivière
2. Angerville
3. Arrancourt
4. Authon-la-Plaine
5. Blandy
6. Bois-Herpin
7. Boissy-la-Rivière
8. Boissy-le-Sec
9. Boutervilliers
10. Bouville
11. Brières-les-Scellés
12. Brouy
13. Chalo-Saint-Mars
14. Chalou-Moulineux
15. Champmotteux
16. Chatignonville
17. Congerville-Thionville
18. Étampes
19. Fontaine-la-Rivière
20. La Forêt-Sainte-Croix
21. Guillerval
22. Marolles-en-Beauce
23. Le Mérévillois
24. Mérobert
25. Mespuits
26. Monnerville
27. Morigny-Champigny
28. Ormoy-la-Rivière
29. Plessis-Saint-Benoist
30. Puiselet-le-Marais
31. Pussay
32. Roinvilliers
33. Saclas
34. Saint-Cyr-la-Rivière
35. Saint-Escobille
36. Saint-Hilaire
37. Valpuiseaux
