= Arpajon =

Commune in Île-de-France, France

- Commune
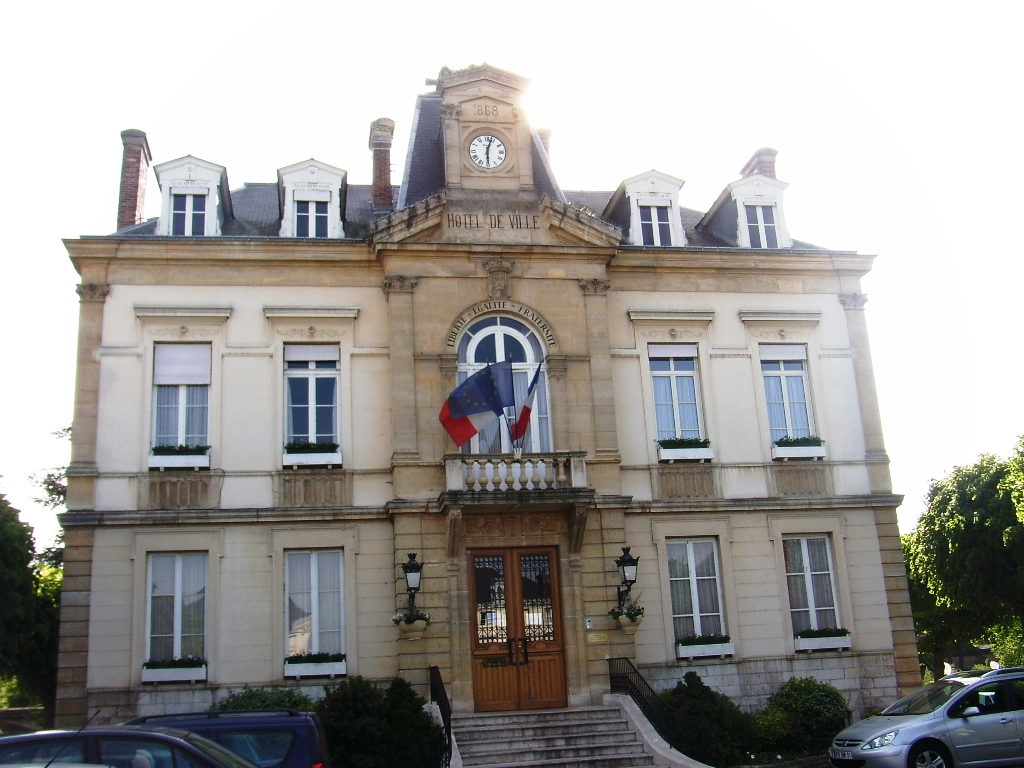
- The city hall

- Coat of arms
- Location of Arpajon
- Location within France Location within Île-de-France (region)
- Coordinates: 48°35′24″N 2°14′51″E
- Country: France
- Region: Île-de-France
- Department: Essonne
- Arrondissement: Palaiseau
- Canton: Arpajon
- Intercommunality: CA Cœur Essonne Agglomération

Government
  - Mayor (2020–2026): Christian Béraud
- Area^{1}: 2.40 km^{2} (0.93 sq mi)
- Highest elevation: 89 m (292 ft)
- Lowest elevation: 47 m (154 ft)
- Population (2023): 11,698
  - Density: 4,870/km^{2} (12,600/sq mi)
- Time zone: UTC+01:00 (CET)
  - Summer (DST): UTC+02:00 (CEST)
- INSEE/Postal code: 91021 /91290
- ^{1} French Land Register data, which excludes lakes, ponds, glaciers > 1 km^{2} (0.386 sq mi or 247 acres) and river estuaries.

Arpajon ([aʁpaʒɔ̃]) is a commune in the Essonne department in the Île-de-France region of northern France.

The commune has been awarded three flowers by the National Council of Towns and Villages in Bloom in the Competition of cities and villages in Bloom.

== Geography ==
=== Location ===
Arpajon is the capital of a canton located in the Paris urban area in the heart of the department of Essonne and the natural region of Hurepoix some 31 km south of Paris (Notre-Dame - point zero for distances from Paris), 15 kilometres west of Évry, 14 km south of Palaiseau, 6 km south of Montlhéry, 14 km north-west of La Ferté-Alais, 19 km east of Dourdan, 17 km west of Corbeil-Essonnes, 18 km north of Étampes, and 26 km north-west of Milly-la-Forêt.

The commune is also 410 km north of its homonym Arpajon-sur-Cère in Cantal department., the original stronghold of the lords of the town.

The commune consists of only 240 hectares but it is the capital of Arpajonnais Country which extends from Breuillet in the east to Brétigny-sur-Orge in the west and from Leuville-sur-Orge in the north to Cheptainville in the south. The relatively small size of the commune does not preclude a significant height differential from 89 to 47 metres altitude which causes a relatively large concentration of buildings on nearly 80% of the territory. Agricultural areas, which represent only 10% of the territory, are located in the extreme north-east of the commune along Route nationale 20.

Land Use
Type of Use	Percentage	Area (hectares)
Built-up Urban Area	81.0%	192.81
Vacant Urban Area	9.1%	21.61
Rural area	9.9%	23.56
Source : Institut d'aménagement et d'urbanisme de la région d'Île-de-France (Iaurif)

=== Hydrography ===
Arpajon lies at the confluence of the Rémarde and the Orge rivers which join then separate in the centre of the town to permanently join at the border with Saint-Germain-lès-Arpajon. On the communal area the two rivers flow in parallel, the Rémarde coming from the west from Ollainville and, further south, the Orge comes from Égly with both streams flowing towards the north-east.

=== Relief and geology ===
The city centre is in the Orge valley at an altitude of approximately 47 metres but the territory extending north and south rises rapidly to the Avrainville plateau in the south, La Norville in the east, and the start of the Linas hill to the north which means it is necessary to climb to exit the commune. The highest point in the commune at 89 metres is located north of the Butte-aux-Grès area near the Linas forest. Due to the low height of the town relative to the surroundings there are many television receiving antennae which are sometimes ten metres above the roofs.

The territory lies on the boundary of the limestone geological area of the Paris basin and the sand of the Beauce with, in the extreme north, the remains of sandstone quarries.

=== Climate ===
Arpajon is located in Île-de-France and enjoys an attenuated oceanic climate characterized by cold winters, warm summers, and rainfall evenly distributed over the year. The average temperatures recorded at the departmental station at Brétigny-sur-Orge (5 km north-east of Arpajon) came to 10.8 °C with average maximum and minimum of 15.2 °C and 6.4 °C. The actual maximum and minimum temperatures recorded are 24.5 °C in July and 0.7 °C in January with record temperatures of 38.2 °C on 1 July 1952 and −19.6 °C on 17 January 1985. The situation in the large suburbs of the commune leads to a lower urban density than Paris with a negative difference of one to two degrees Celsius compared to Paris. Located near the Paris city centre and without the presence of large areas of culture, however, sunshine hours for the commune amounted to 1,798 annually as it is throughout the north of the department. With 598.3 millimeters of rainfall over the year and an approximate distribution of 50 mm per month, the town receives rainfall in the same proportion as other regions north of the Loire.

=== Communication and transport ===
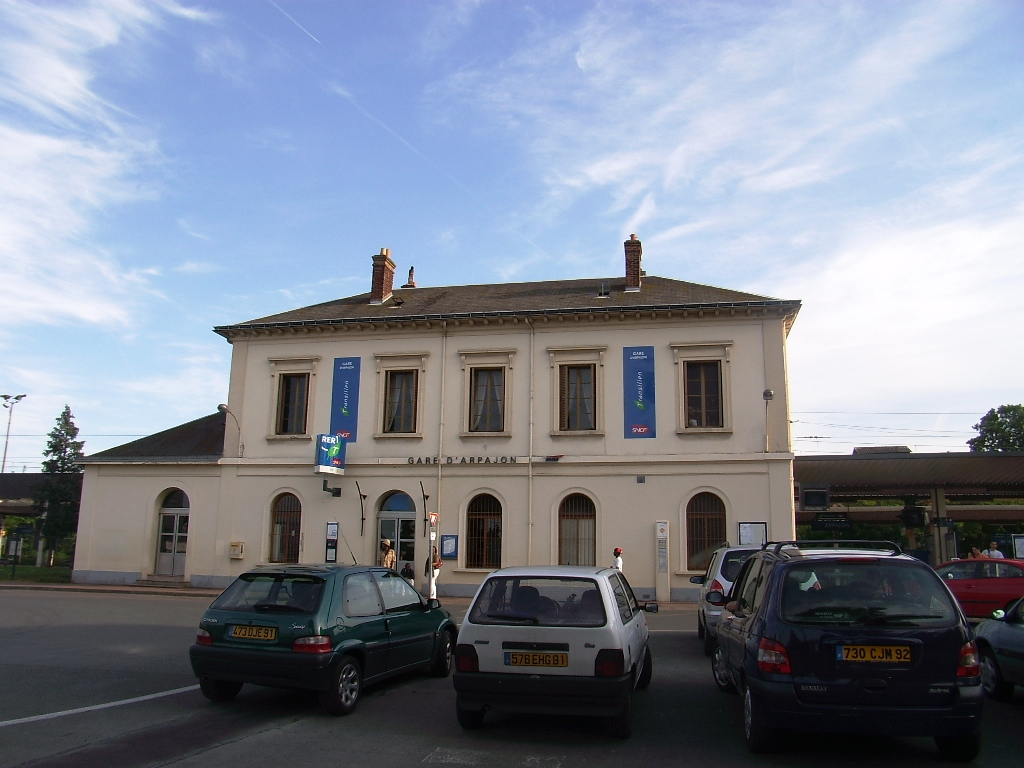
Arpajon railway station.

The main transport route for the commune is Route nationale 20 which has avoided the centre of town by a deviation west since 1956 and crosses Arpajon from north to south. The commune is also the point of convergence of three important departmental roads: the D116D that leads to Dourdan in the west, the D449 that leads to La Ferté-Alais in the south, and the D152 that leads to Brétigny-sur-Orge in the east and to Limours in the west which is duplicated by the D97 which also goes to Limours. In addition there are the D192 which is a fast route through the Arpajon-Égly-Breuillet urban area and the D193 which connects to the D19. The commune is located four kilometres south of the Francilienne, a major regional axis that allows quick access to the A10 autoroute and A6 autoroute.

The Bretigny-Tours railway passes across the commune from west to east with Arpajon C4 RER station in the south of the commune served by two trains per hour.

The town is also served by:

- Albatrans bus network:
  - Route 91.04 to Évry
- Daniel Meyer bus network:
  - Route DM151 to Paris-Porte d'Orléans 19
  - Route DM153 to Massy-Palaiseau
  - Route DM19 to Brétigny-sur-Orge 20
  - Route DM20 to Arpajonnais Country between Égly and Norville 21 .
- Ormont bus network:
  - Route 68.01 to Bruyeres-le-Chatel
  - Route 68.05 to Boissy-sous-Saint-Yon 22, 23 .
- Savac bus network:
  - Route 39.18 to Limours-en-Hurepoix 24 .
- CEAT bus network:
  - Route 10.20 from Paris to Angerville
  - Route 10.21 from Paris to Méréville

There are also some shuttle buses providing free transport in the commune with some dedicated to the elderly.

Orly Airport is located 18 kilometres away and accessible by Route nationale 20. Charles de Gaulle Airport is located 51 km away. For general aviation the Étampes - Mondésir Aerodrome (ICAO: LFOX) is 27 kilometres away.

=== Localities, places, and areas ===
The commune is not extensive so it does not any division into districts. Nevertheless, it is possible to distinguish the city centre, the railway station area, and the Cerpied Mill. In the north, nearby, is a place called La Montagne in reference to the slope to get there from the city centre and, in the extreme north, there is the former Folies quarter which has now become the business district of Butte-aux-Grès. A second business area, Les Belles-Vues, is reminiscent of the once agricultural character of the commune.

== Toponymy ==
The Gallo-Romans placed a castrum to monitor the passage of along the Orge between Lutèce and Cenabum. The castrum became Chastres around the year 250 then Châtres (sometimes Châtres-sous-Montlhery) in the 17th century with the reform of spelling and the appearance of the circumflex in place of the silent "s". Chastres could also mean "land of rivers" in "the barbarian language".

In 1720 Louis de Severac, who was from the Arpajon family of Rouergue bought the marquisate of Châtres. He obtained the privilege of giving his name to the city from the regent Philippe d'Orléans and he called it Arpajon, spreading the use of the name by beating the peasants who had the misfortune to answer Châtres to the question "where do you reside?". In 1794 Philippe de Noailles and his wife Anne d'Arpajon, first lady of honour to Marie-Antoinette, were guillotined. In 1793 the commune took the name of Franc-val or Franeval but returned to Arpajon in 1801.

Similar to Avignon and Arles the preposition "in" is not used. "A residence at Arpajon" is correct while "a residence in Arpajonnais" is also correct usage.

== History ==
=== Origins ===
At the time of Roman Gaul there was a castrum was installed at the intersection of the road from Lutèce to Cenabum and the river Orge in the valley that was the territory of the Parisii tribe. The discovery in 1960 of the remains, which included a Gallo-Roman cemetery, certify this ancient occupation. The evolution of the name to Chastres is sometimes dated to the year 250. Two megalithic monuments remain: one in the Library Park and the other near the Rémarde river an inscription in Gallic was found in 1947 and is kept in the Municipal Museum of Saint-Germain-en-Laye.

=== From Chastres to Arpajon ===
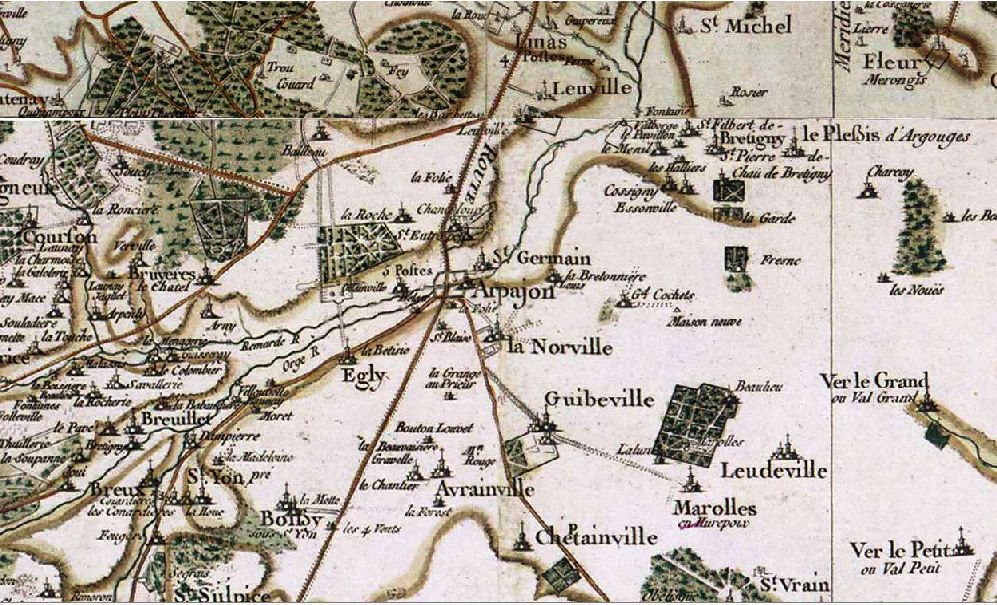
Map of Arpajon according to Cassini

In the 10th century the first church was built in the village but it was quickly ruined. In 1006 the rebuilding of the church and steeple was entrusted to the Benedictine monks of the Abbey of Saint-Maur by Renaud de Vendôme, bishop of Paris and it was consecrated to Pope Clement I. They added a cloister, a priory, and a tithe barn.

A document dated 1265 attests to the presence of a Hotel-Dieu at Arpajon for the accommodation of travelers and the poor. There were also several mills on the Orge and the Rémarde. The town was fortified and had five entrances.

In 1317 Pierre de Chastres was buried in the parish church. In 1360, during the Hundred Years War, the city was besieged by King Edward III of England and the church where there were eight hundred refugees was burned leaving no survivors.

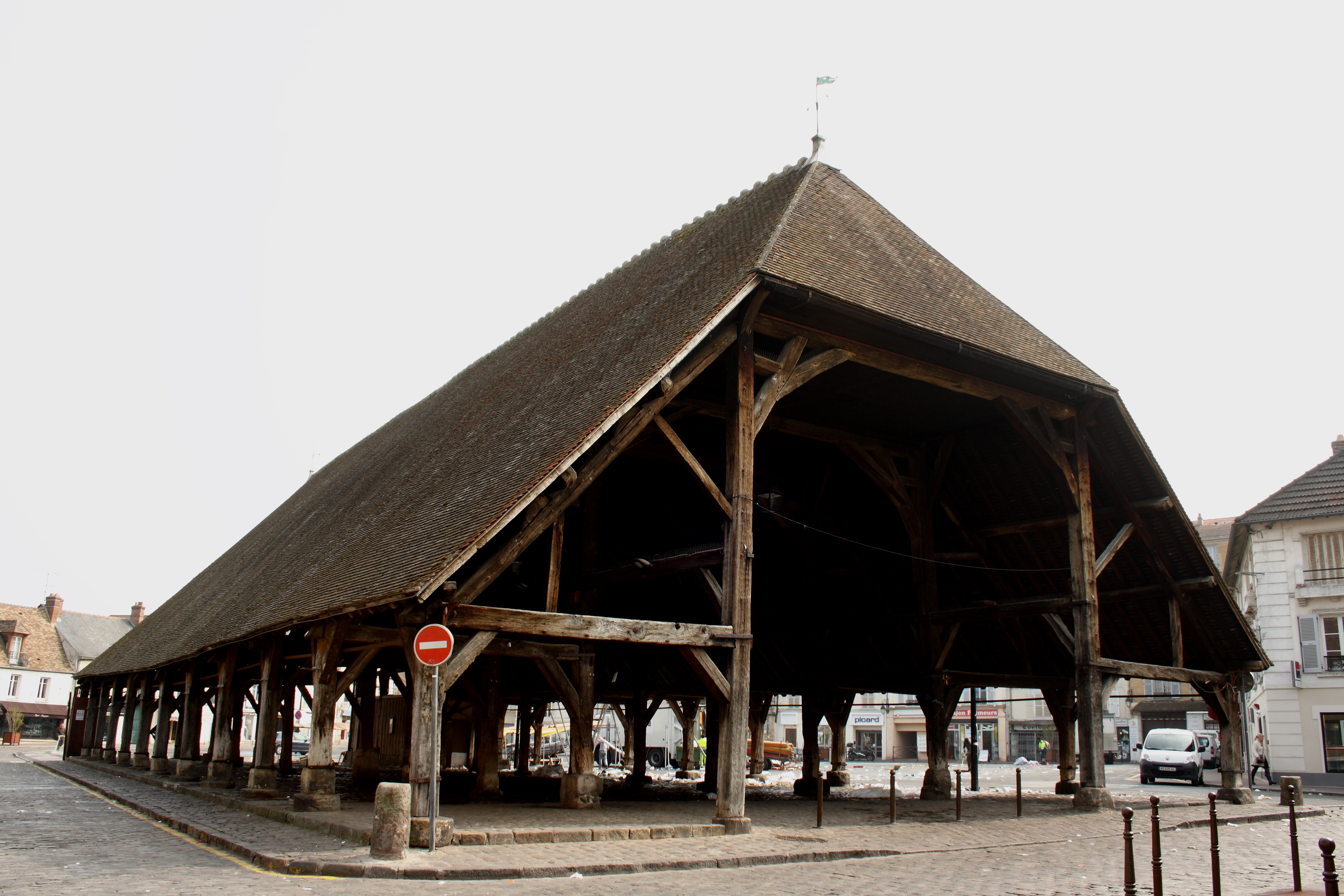
The Covered Market

In 1470 the lordship of Chastres belonged to the lord of Marcoussis. In July 1470 King Louis XI authorised two fair days at Chastres for his counselor and chamberlain Jean du Graville by letters patent. Louis Malet de Graville built a market hall at the crossroads of the Paris to Étampes and Dourdan to Corbeil roads.

In 1510 the monks, through the generosity of the Graville and Montagu families undertook major renovations of the church and in 1542 a sub-delegation of Chastres was attached to the Generality of Paris. In 1545 the lordship of Chastres became independent.

In 1643 the bell named Antoinette was cast. On 28 April 1652 Turenne stationed his troops at Châtres to protect the court at Saint-Germain before he marched on Étampes on 3 May.

In 1717 the Hotel-Dieu was completely rebuilt. In 1720 Louis de Severac, Marquis of Arpajon from the great medieval family of Arpajon, bought and obtained from Philippe d'Orléans the privilege of giving his name to the commune. However, the adoption of the new name took a long time and peasants who refused to abandon the name of Châtres were beaten up. He also promised to reduce local taxes for two years. The Canting arms of the city come from this family. In 1733 he knocked down the old city gate in the north which was too narrow for many carts and instead erected two Pilasters which are the current Porte de Paris. He died on 21 August 1736 and was buried in the choir of the parish church.

=== The French Revolution and growth ===
In 1782 Benjamin Franklin installed a lightning rod on the spire of the Church of Saint Clement. At the Revolution the town chose to adopt the name of Francval. There was a custom to give the name of the place of baptism as a second or third name: thus a boy was named Francval in year II.

Philippe de Noailles was lord of Arpajon and he was long in great favour at court with his wife being first lady of honour to Marie Antoinette, nicknamed by her Madame Etiquette. This Court favour brought down punishment in the days of the Revolution and the old marshal and his wife were guillotined on 27 June 1794.

The castle was sold in 1802 and demolished. In 1800 the Canton of Arpajon was created then attached to the Arrondissement of Corbeil in the department of Seine-et-Oise. In 1806 Napoleon I and Empress Josephine visited the town and made offering at the high altar of the church. In 1833 a large Post and Telegraph office was opened.

Modernisation of Arpajon in the 19th century

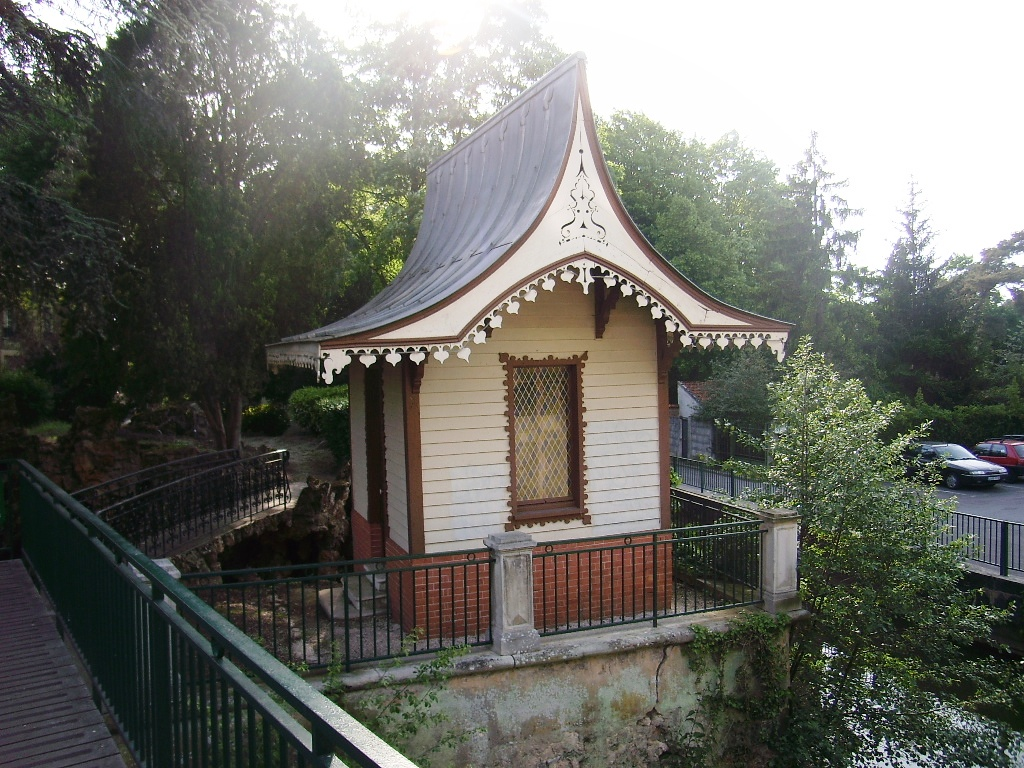
The Tonkin Pagoda

In 1851 the Martin brothers, originating from Limoges, set up a shoe factory which, in 1900, employed 450 adults and about 50 children. It was bought by André shoes in 1920 and closed its doors forever in 1956. In 1868 the commune built a City Hall for use instead of the feudal castle. Then, in 1889, it bought the Pagoda that was presented by Tonkin during the Universal Exhibition of Paris.

In the same year the Compagnie de chemin de fer sur route de Paris à Arpajon (Railway Company for the Paris to Arpajon route) which in 1893 opened the Porte d'Orléans-Antony and Antony-Longjumeau-Montlhery sections then the Montlhery-Arpajon section in 1894 for passengers. In the surrounding villages of Marcoussis, Linas, and Montlhéry, market gardening was very important and from 1911 to 1936 led to expansion of the railway to transport tomatoes, strawberries, and beans grown in the fields to the Paris markets.

In the second half of the 19th century the Boulevard de la Gare was opened with the inauguration of the railway station in 1865 and the construction of holiday villas.

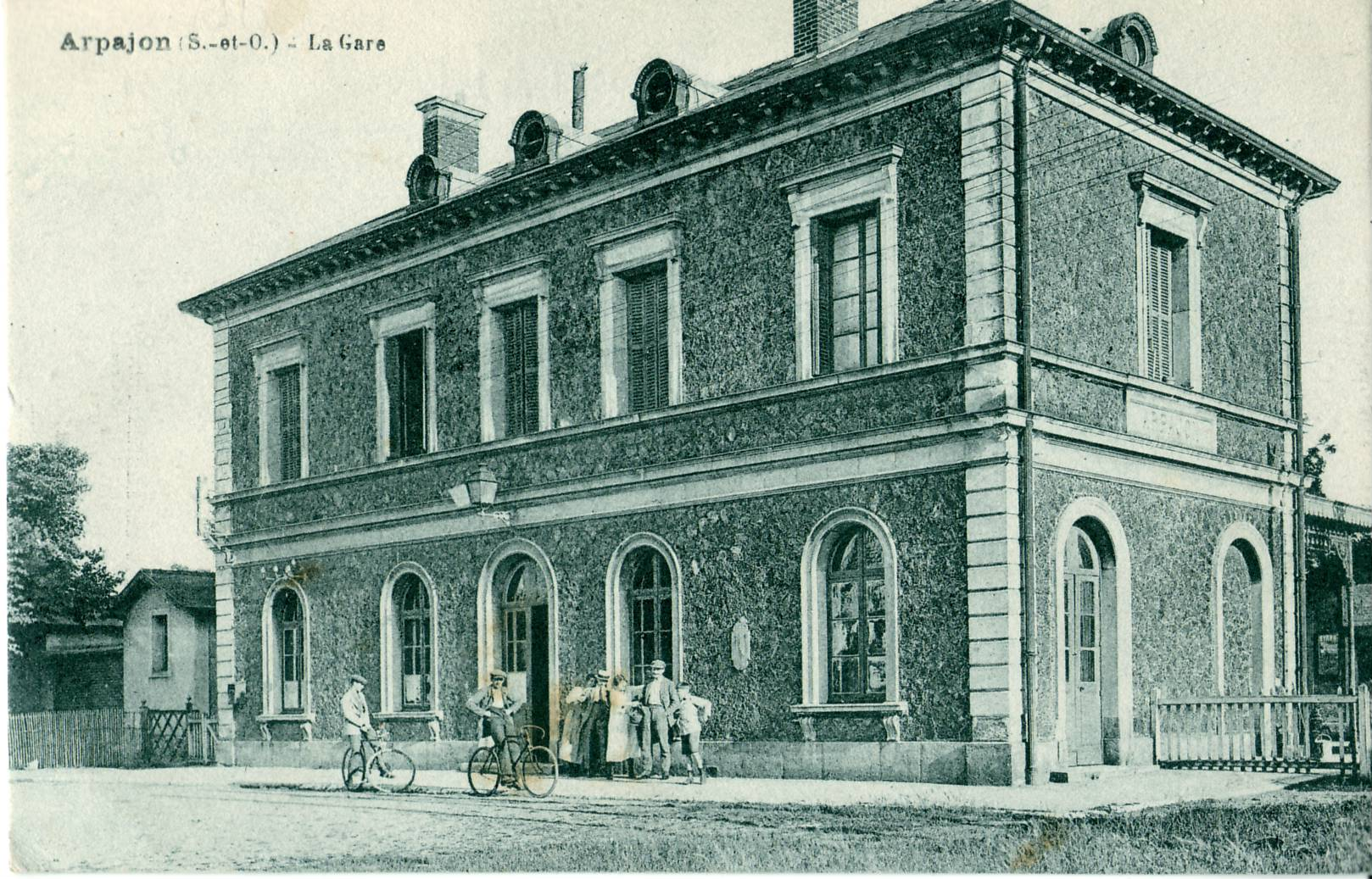
Arpajon railway station at the beginning of the 20th century.

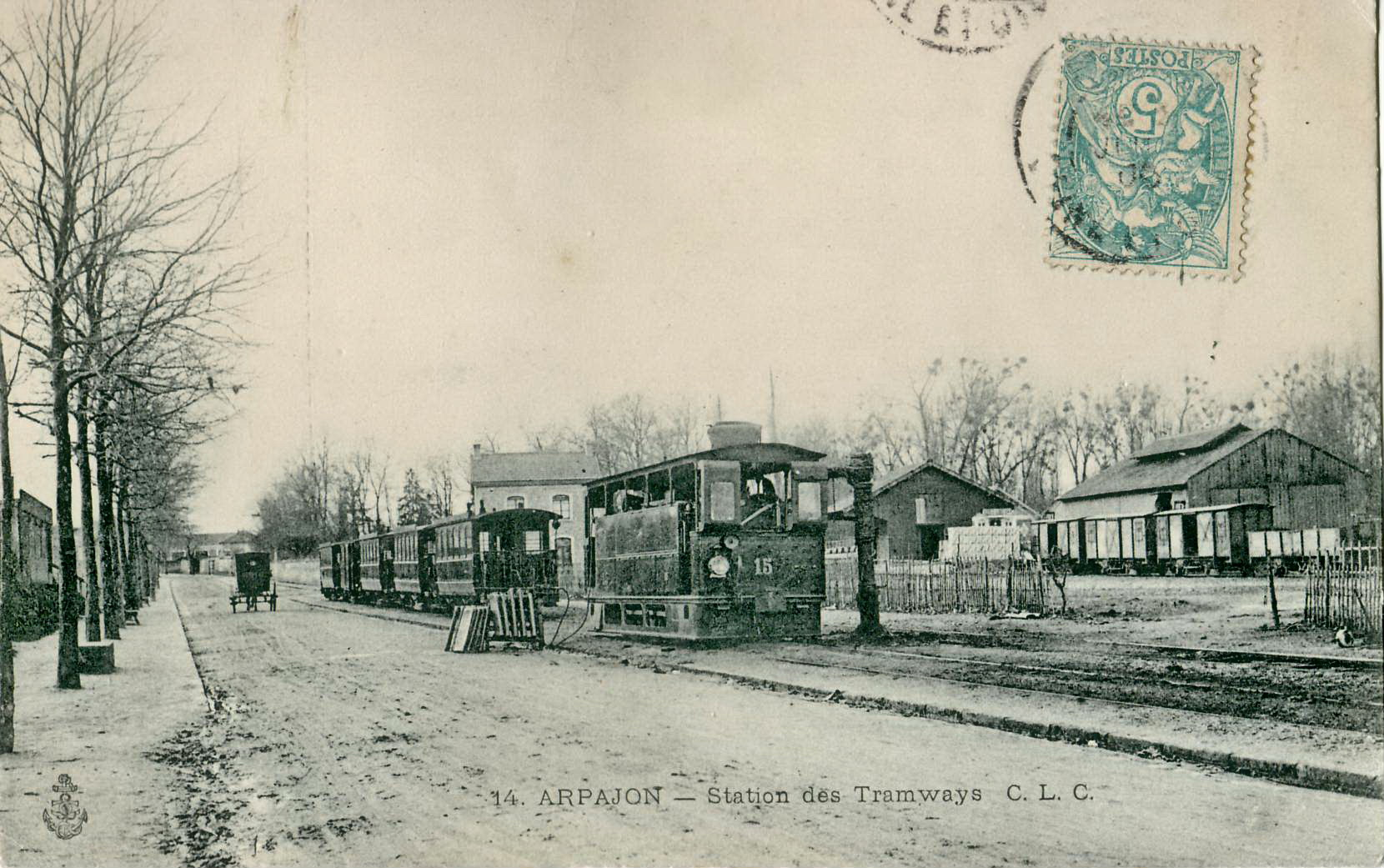
The Arpajonnais tramway station behind Arpajon railway station was used at the beginning of the 20th century by the CGB.

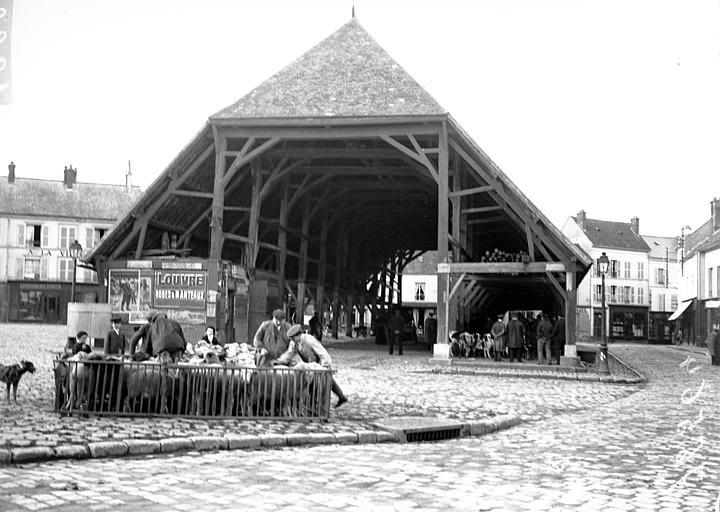
The covered market at the beginning of the 20th century.

=== Modern History ===
In 1922 the first Bean Fair was inaugurated which was classified as a national fair in 1970. On 6 July 1924 on the long, straight Route nationale 20 between Arpajon and Torfou, René Thomas set a land speed record of 230.47 km/h (143.21 mph) in a Delage called La Torpille (The Torpedo) followed, on 12 July 1924, by Ernest A.D. Eldridge who increased the record to 234.98 km/h (146.01 mph) in a Fiat Special called Mephistopheles II. In 1934 the Hôtel-Dieu became a hospice as a result of the construction of the first hospital outside the town. On 22 August 1944 the commune was liberated by the Leclerc division. In 1948 Abel Cornaton, mayor of the commune, endowed the municipal showers which became the district court in 1985.

On 23 April 1977 Arpajon was on the path of the Tour cycliste de l'Essonne. On 1 January 1968, after the breakup of Seine-et-Oise department, Arpajon was integrated into the new French department of Essonne and abandoned its former postal code - 78021. Arpajon was also the last stage town of the Tour de France in 1999 before a journey of 143 kilometres to Paris .

=== Heraldry ===
This coat of arms is an adaptation of those of the Marquis Louis VI of Arpajon, lord of the town, which is shown on the right: Quarterly, first and fourth Azure three fleurs de lys bordure the same; second and third Gules a harp Or These arms can be seen at the Chateau de Sévérac and are those of the old commune of Chastres. The presence of the harp makes these Canting arms. Note the error in the image which omits the gold border around the fleurs-de-lis. The current arms are blazoned: Quarterly, at 1 Gules a cross of Toulouse Argent, at 2 Argent with four pales Gules, at 3 Gules a harp Or, at 4 Azure a bendlet couped sinister Gules between 3 fleurs-de-lis of Or 2 and 1, over all an inescutcheon Gules, a Cross of Malta Argent.	blazon2

== Politics and Administration ==
=== Local politics ===
Arpajon is the chief town of the canton represented by the general counsel Christian Béraud (PS), mayor of the commune. It is attached to the third electoral district of Essonne and represented by MP Michel Pouzol (PS). Its current mayor is Christian Beraud (PS) who is assisted by eight deputy mayors chosen from a municipal council of 29 elected members. INSEE has assigned the code 91 3 01 021 41. Arpajon commune is recorded in the register of companies under the code SIREN 219 100 211. Its activity is registered under code APE 8411Z.

In 2009 the commune had a budget of €16,504,000 of which €11,359,000 was Operational and €5,145,000 investment, of which 34.85% is funded by local taxes. Municipal debt in the same year was €487,000. In 2009 the tax rate was 11.78% for the residential tax, 14.74% Developed Property tax, 46.78% for undeveloped property, and 15.09% for the business tax fixed by the inter-communality. The commune has a communal social welfare centre and, in 2017, had 942 HLM housing units or 19.6% of all main residences.

The town is part of the communauté d'agglomération Cœur d'Essonne which includes 21 communes, and is responsible for economic development, town planning and roads, social housing policy, sports, culture and early childhood, collection and treatment of garbage, and welcoming travelers. It also is a member of the Joint Association of the valley of the Orge (SIVOA) with 32 other communes for the preservation and enhancement of the environment.

Municipal Council of Arpajon (mandate 2014-2020).
List	Party	President	Number	Status
"Act with you"	PS	Christian Béraud	25	Majority
"Arpajon, my life, my town"	UMP	Arnaud Mathieu	5	Opposition
"Arpajon, navy blue"	FN	Alain Buffle	3	Opposition

List of Successive Mayors

Mayors from the French Revolution to 1938

From	To	Name
1800	1811	Louis Auguste Laisne
1811	1815	Jean Becker
1815	1816	Jean-Louis Perrot
1816	1830	Pierre-Romain Drollet
1830	1834	Pierre-Adrien Trocmé
1834	1842	Jean-Louis Jumeau
1842	1843	Pierre-Louis Ingrain
1843	1852	Ange-Louis Lambert
1852	1860	Pierre-Adrien Trocmé
1860	1865	Désiré Imbault
1865	1877	Clovis Cottance
1877	1878	Adrien Louis Trocmé
1878	1882	Louis Jean Jumeau
1882	1895	François Victor Jeanmaire
1895	1898	Louis Paul Chollet
1898	1900	Julien Petit
1900	1904	François Etienne Champion
1904	1906	Edouard Robert
1906	1910	Louis Jules Babin
1910	1919	Gilles Guillaume Verdié
1919	1923	Adolphe Robin
1923	1929	Albert Émile Mouton
1929	1935	Alfred Anthime Richard
1935	1938	Anatole Reveilhac

Mayors from 1938

From	To	Name	Party
1938	1944	Eugène Garnier	
1944	1983	Louis Abel Cornaton	
1983	1989	Théophile Guesdon	
1989	1995	André Hervé	
1995	2000	Madeleine Durand	
2001	2011	Pascal Fournier	
2011	2026	Christian Béraud	PS

=== Political tendencies ===
Politics in Arpajon in recent years have been characterized by ambivalent results which frequently follow national trends. The commune, which has sometimes been rightist, swung to a narrow lead in 2001 for the left with the election of Pascal Fournier (Socialist) who was elected in the first round in 2008 with 77.29% of the vote. In fact, local elections (cantonal or regional) have always been won by the left except for the partial cantonal elections in 2004 resulting in only 50.87% for Philippe Le Fol (DVD). Conversely, and always in accordance with the national results, the elections of 2002 and 2007, as with the presidential elections in 2002 and 2007, were largely won by the parliamentary right. In 2002 the result for Jean-Marie Le Pen (18.20%) was higher in Arpajon as compared to the national (17.79%) and the departmental (15.04%) figures. Similarly, Arpajon voters followed the national movement during the European elections in 2004 where the left was ahead of the right but at the referendum on the Treaty establishing a Constitution for Europe the "no" won.

=== Education ===
Arpajon schools are attached to the Academy of Versailles. The commune has the Édouard-Herriot primary school, the Anatole France and La Rémarde kindergartens, and the Victor Hugo elementary school. In addition there is the private Catholic Sainte-Jeanne d'Arc school in the Diocese. Strangely the town does not have a college and students attend the Jean Moulin and Albert Camus colleges in the neighbouring commune of La Norville or the Roland Garros college in Saint-Germain-lès-Arpajon.

Because of its status as capital of the canton, however, there are three higher schools, the Edmond Michelet general and technological school which provides training in BTS IRIS., the René-Cassin general and technological which had an 88% pass-rate for the baccalauréat in 2007, and the Paul Belmondo professional school. The premises of the hospital centre is also a training centre for caregivers.

An information and referral center is present in the commune. Recreation centres cater for children outside school hours and two crèches welcome young children. The CIPF is present in the town.

=== Health ===
The commune has a hospital with a capacity of 302 beds, offering services such as: Surgery, Obstetrics, Pediatrics, Gastroenterology, Diabetology, Cardiology, Pneumology, and Radiography. An ambulance service supplemented by a mobile emergency and resuscitation service is active for 42 neighbouring communes. The centre is spread over four sites: the central hospital, the rehabilitation centre in the neighbouring commune of Égly, and the Village du Pays retirement homes at Châtres and Guinchard, the latter hosting Alzheimer day patients. A family planning centre and a maternal and child healthcare centre are located in the commune.

The private hospital of Paris-Essonne, formerly the Charmilles Clinic, completes the offering with 60 beds, a surgery, and a specialization in pathologies of the face: ophthalmology, oto-rhino-laryngology, and dentistry.

In the town there are 47 doctors and 12 dentists are in private practice. There also 4 pharmacies.

=== Public services ===
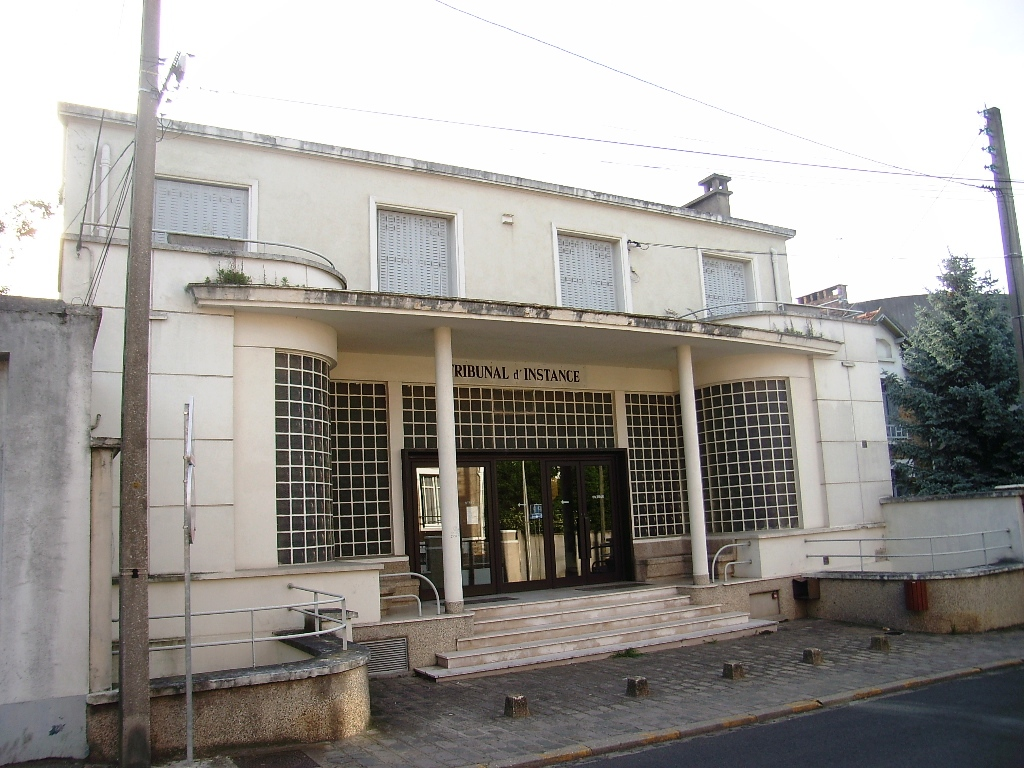
The former District Court, originally the Municipal Baths.

Security in the commune is ensured by the presence of a police commisariat as well as a fire and rescue centre.

Public service bodies are relatively numerous in Arpajon which has a postal agency an Employment office and ASSEDICs, a Treasury and Tax centre a family allowance office a primary health insurance office, and a subdivision of the DDE.

Two notarial offices, a bailiff's office, and two lawyers attached to the bar of Évry is located in the town.

From 1985 to 2009 a Registry of the District Court was installed in the town. Before the reform of the justice system the commune had a District Court but now depends on the one at Longjumeau, as with the Labour Court, the High Court, and the Commerce Court at Évry which are all attached to the Court of Appeal of Paris.

=== Twinning ===
Arpajon has twinning associations with:

- Freising (Germany) since 1990.

== Demography ==
The inhabitants of the commune are known as Arpajonnais or Arpajonnaises in French. Arpajon has seen demographic evolution of a town now part of the Paris Urban Area. From 1,988 inhabitants in Arpajon counted in the first census of 1793, the population grew slowly until the first demographic accident in 1846 when the population dropped to 2,017 and a second more important one in 1856 when it dropped to 1,890. Thereafter the demography increased up to 2,822 in 1872 to relatively stabilize before a new sustained growth after of World War I with 3,221 in 1921. The population increased again after the Second World War despite the 139 civilian and military casualties from both conflicts. After the construction of large housing estates the population reached 4,550 people in 1954, 8,105 in 1975 and 9,668 in the 2006 census. In 1999 10.8% of Arpajon people were foreigners and 14% of households consisted of single-parent families or 2 percent more for each category compared to the departmental figures. Among the foreign population, 3.4% were from Portugal, 1.6% from Morocco and Turkey, 1.3% from Algeria, 0.3% from Tunisia, and 0.2% for Spain and Italy.

Historical population

Year	Pop.	±% p.a.
1793	1,988	—
1800	2,153	+1.15%
1806	2,110	−0.34%
1821	2,173	+0.20%
1831	2,165	−0.04%
1836	2,172	+0.06%
1841	2,234	+0.56%
1846	2,017	−2.02%
1851	2,094	+0.75%
1856	1,890	−2.03%
1861	2,148	+2.59%
1866	2,565	+3.61%
1872	2,822	+1.60%
1876	2,779	−0.38%
1881	2,776	−0.02%
1886	2,851	+0.53%
1891	2,970	+0.82%
1896	3,032	+0.41%
1901	2,904	−0.86%

Year	Pop.	±% p.a.
1906	2,975	+0.48%
1911	3,191	+1.41%
1921	3,221	+0.09%
1926	3,578	+2.12%
1931	3,999	+2.25%
1936	4,069	+0.35%
1946	4,195	+0.31%
1954	4,550	+1.02%
1962	5,935	+3.38%
1968	6,576	+1.72%
1975	8,105	+3.03%
1982	7,999	−0.19%
1990	8,713	+1.07%
1999	9,053	+0.43%
2007	9,918	+1.15%
2012	10,832	+1.78%
2017	10,378	−0.85%
2023	11,698	+2.02%

Source: EHESS and INSEE

=== Distribution of Age Groups ===
Population by age of Arpajon, 2023 (%)

80+	6.3
65–79	10.2
55–64	10.9
40–54	18.7
25–39	23.8
15–24	12.4
0–14	17.4

Total: 99.7

male

female

Source: INSEE

Population by age of Essonne, 2023 (%)

90+	4.5
75–89	11.1
60–74	11.7
45–59	19.8
30–44	19.8
15–29	13.1
0–14	20.2

Total: 100.2

male

female

Source: INSEE

== Economy ==
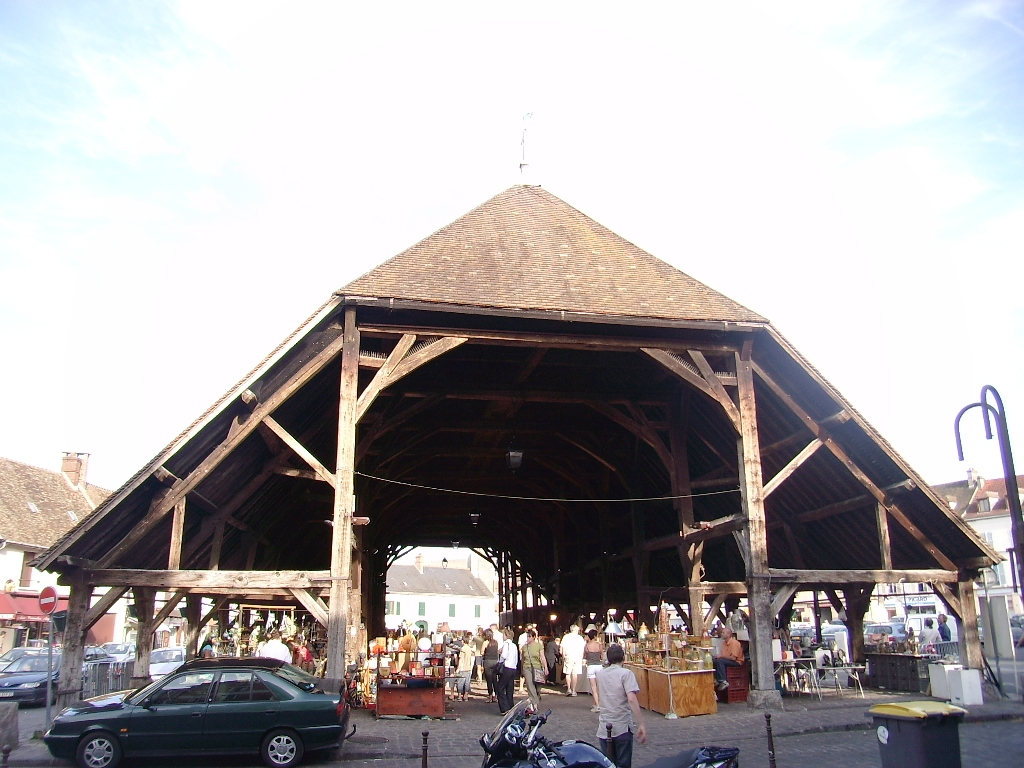
West side of the great covered market in Arpajon.

As the capital of Arpajonnais and a historic land of market gardening, the commune has long been a place of trade and known for its fair since the 13th century. It has now lost the agricultural role (only three farms remain) and commerce favours other communes in the Canton. It remains, however, with a town centre with plenty of shops gathered around a merchants association. More than six hundred businesses are located in the commune with nearly a third of these shops. In 2004 52 new businesses were created in the commune. Two industrial areas include most of the other businesses: the Belles-Vues and the Butte-aux-Grès, both located in the north of the commune along Route nationale 20.

Arpajon is grouped into the labour pool (zone d'emploi) of Saclay by INSEE. In 2017 the Arpajon workforce was 5,365 people divided into 28.2% of employees, 27.0% of middle management, and 21.3% of workers. There were three people employed in agriculture. On the same date 10.3% of the active population was unemployed and only 18.7% worked in the commune. With 800 employees, the hospital is the largest employer, followed distantly by the family allowance office (300 staff), the René-Cassin School, and the municipality itself with 200 employees each.

A market is held in the covered market every Friday morning.

=== Employment, income and standard of living ===
In 2017 the median income in the town stood at 20,700 euros, but 41% of the population was not liable for the income tax. 57.9% of main residences in Arpajon were rented, including 19.6% in HLM type dwellings. In 2010 the median household income tax was €28,718, placing Arpajon at 16,379th place among the 31,525 communes with more than 39 households in France.

Division of Employees by professions and categories in 2017.
	Farmers	Tradesmen, Shopkeepers, Heads of business	Manager and Professionals intellectuals	Middle Managers	Employees	Workers
Arpajon	0.0%	6.3%	22.3%	28.2%	29.7%	13.6%
Division of Employees by sector of activity in 2017.
	Agriculture	Industry	Construction	Trade, transport and services	Public services	
Arpajon	0.0%	4.4%	4.8%	40.6%	50.3%	
Source: Insee

== Culture and heritage ==
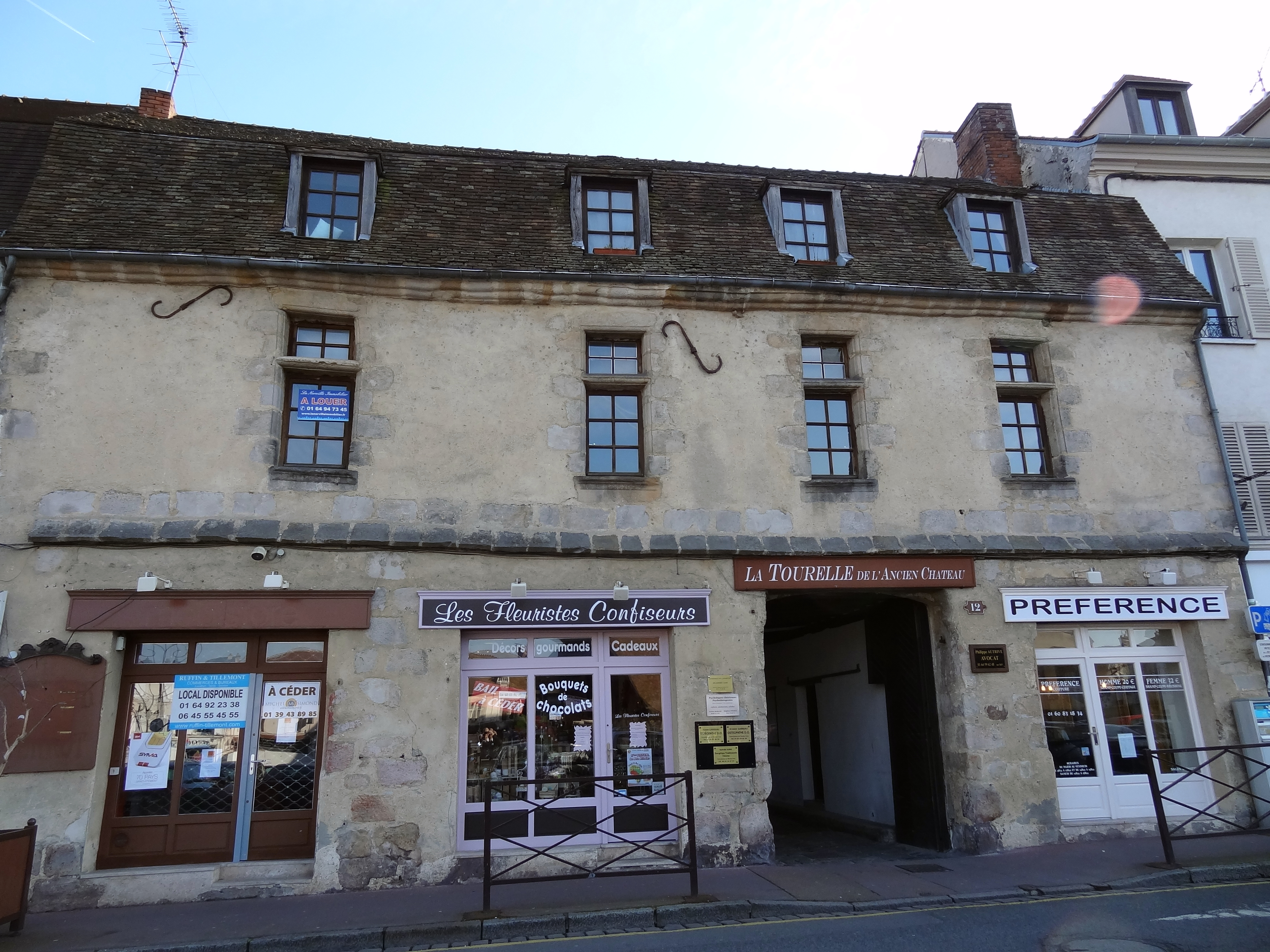
15th century house

=== Civil heritage ===
The commune has a number of buildings and sites that are registered as historical monuments:

- The War Memorial 1914-1918 at Avenue de la Division Leclerc (20th century)
- The Municipal Showers (1947)
- The Town Hall (1868). The Town Hall contains several items that are registered as historical objects:
  - A Clock (19th century)
  - A set of 4 light fittings (20th century)
  - A set of 3 Chandeliers (20th century)
  - A Hearth (2) (19th century)
  - A Hearth (1) (19th century)
  - A Bust: Marianne (20th century)
  - A Mural Painting: The communal genius presiding over great acts of civil life (1870)
- The Hôtel-Dieu Saint-Antoine and Saint-Sulpice (19th century). was founded in the 12th century to house pilgrims on the road to Saint Jacques de Compostela and became a hospital under the Revolution. It was completely rebuilt from 1819 to 1852 and is still used as a retirement home 120 . Adds the hall built in 1868 121 enhanced by the place de l'Hôtel-de-Ville in 1776 and refurbished in 1868 ranked since 1944 122 . The Hôtel-Dieu contains two items that are registered as historical objects:
  - A Bell called Marie (1517)
  - A Painting: Rest during the flight from Egypt (19th century)
- An Ornamental Garden (19th century)
- A Lavoir (Public laundry) (1748)
- The Town Hall Square (Place de la Mairie) (1776)
- The War Memorial at Place de la Mairie (20th century)
- The Porte de Paris city gate (1730)
- The Railway Station (19th century)
- The Covered Market (1470). The covered market is 35 metres long and 18 metres wide.
- Arpajon Town (16th-20th century)

In addition there are a very large number of houses that are registered as historical monuments.

=== Religious heritage ===
The commune has several religious buildings and structures that are registered as historical monuments:

- The Tomb of A. Paragot and A. Servant (19th century)
- The Tomb of the Buard-Lanelongue family (19th century)
- The Funeral Chapel of the Anglade-Debauge family (20th century)
- The Tomb of Eugène Lagauche (1906)
- The Tomb of the Betrouille-Dupouet family (19th century)
- The Funeral Chapel of the Laperche family (20th century)
- The Tomb of Cécile Guinchard and Jean Georges Lainé (19th century)
- The Parish Church of Saint-Clement (11th century). The church contains a very large number of items that are registered as historical objects.

Stained Glass in the Church of Saint-Clement

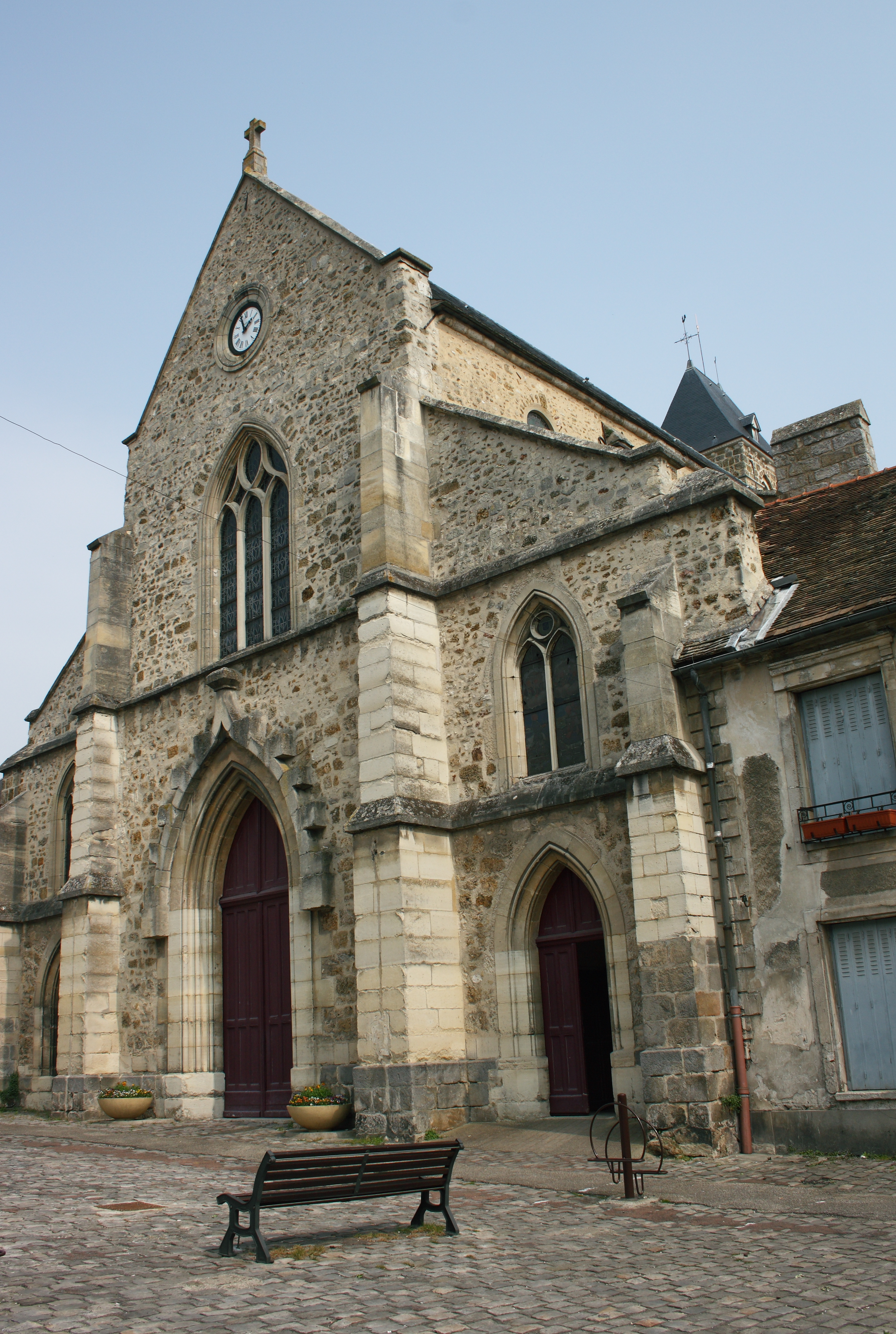
The Church of Saint Clement

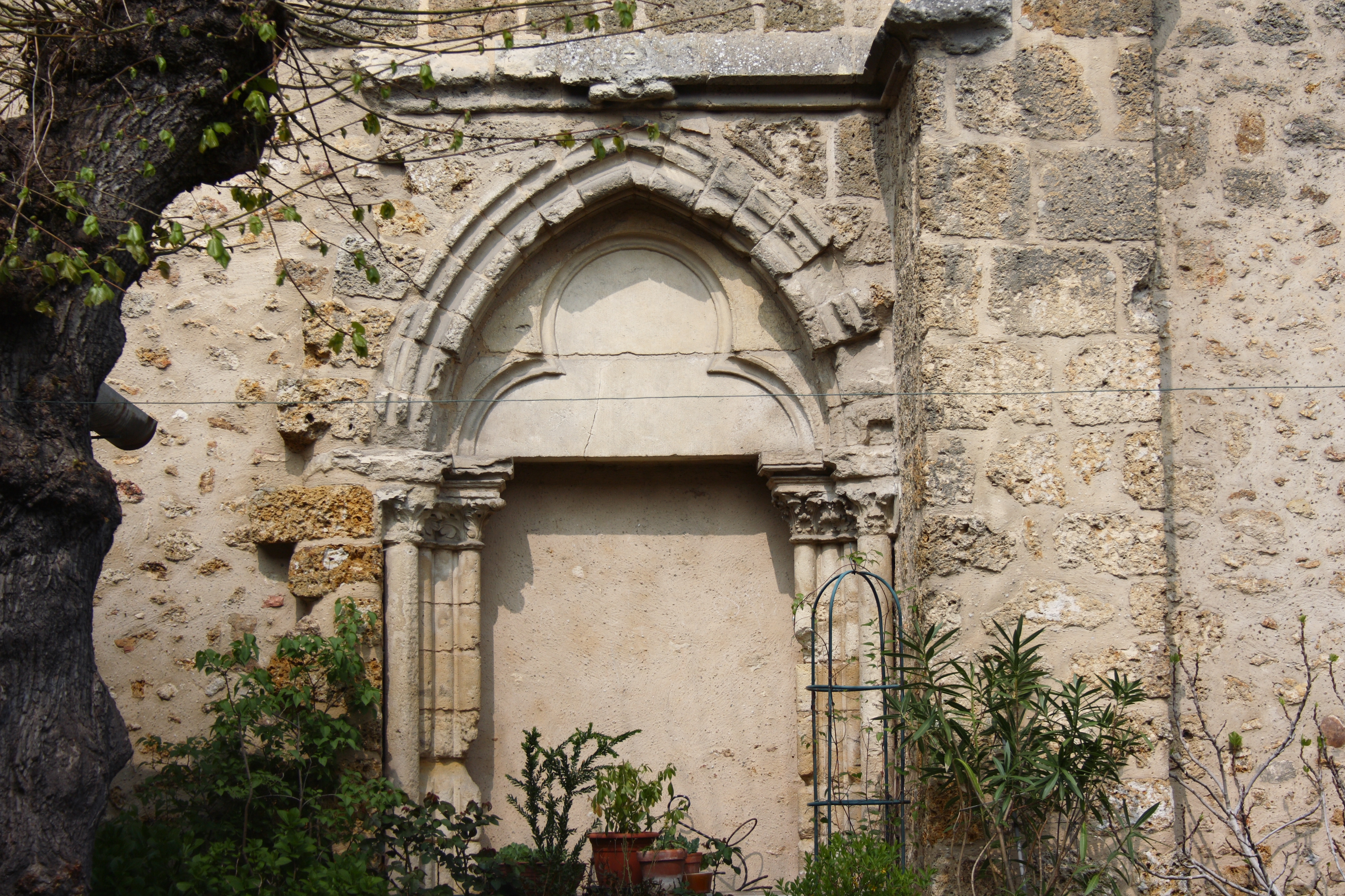

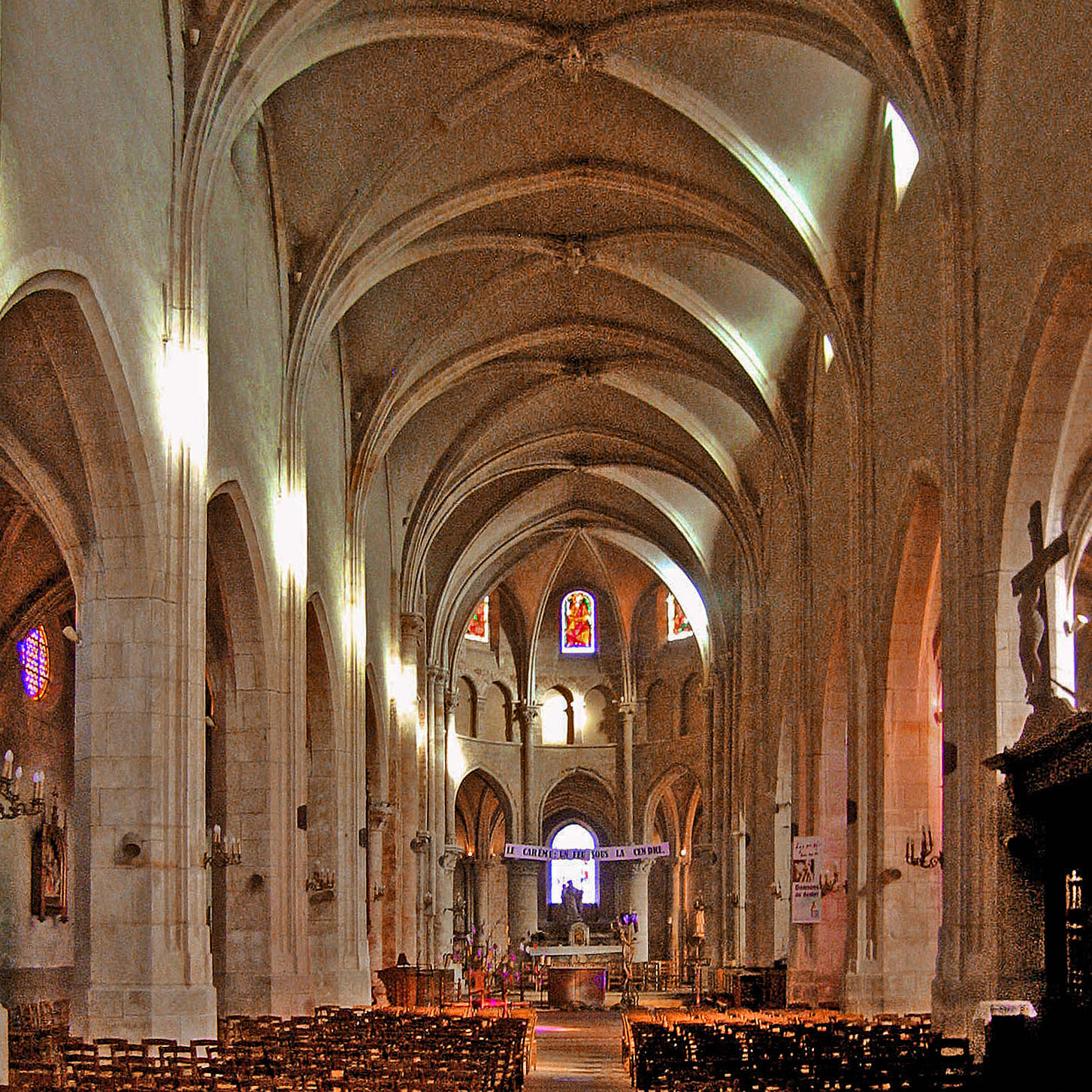
The Nave

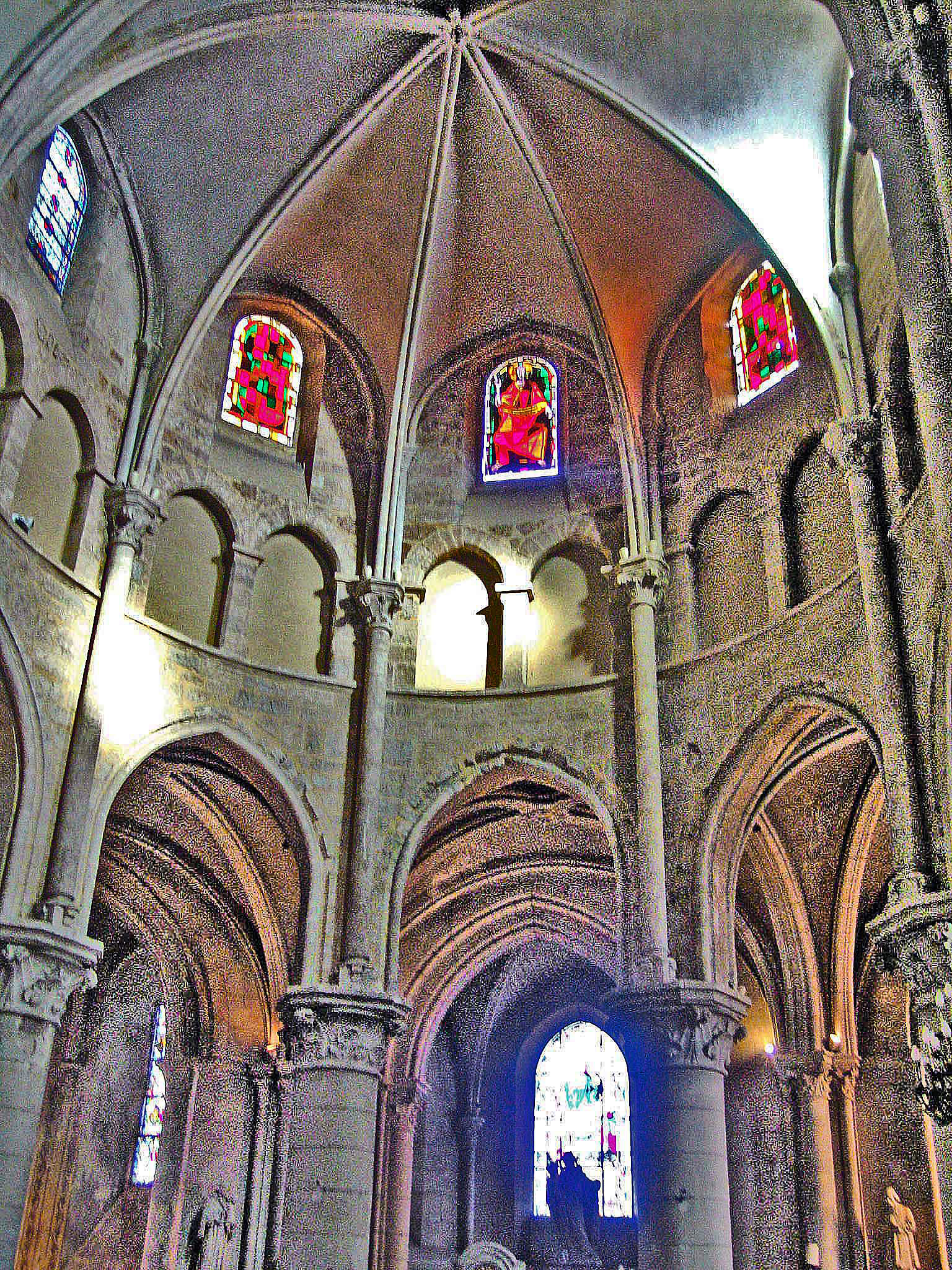
The Choir

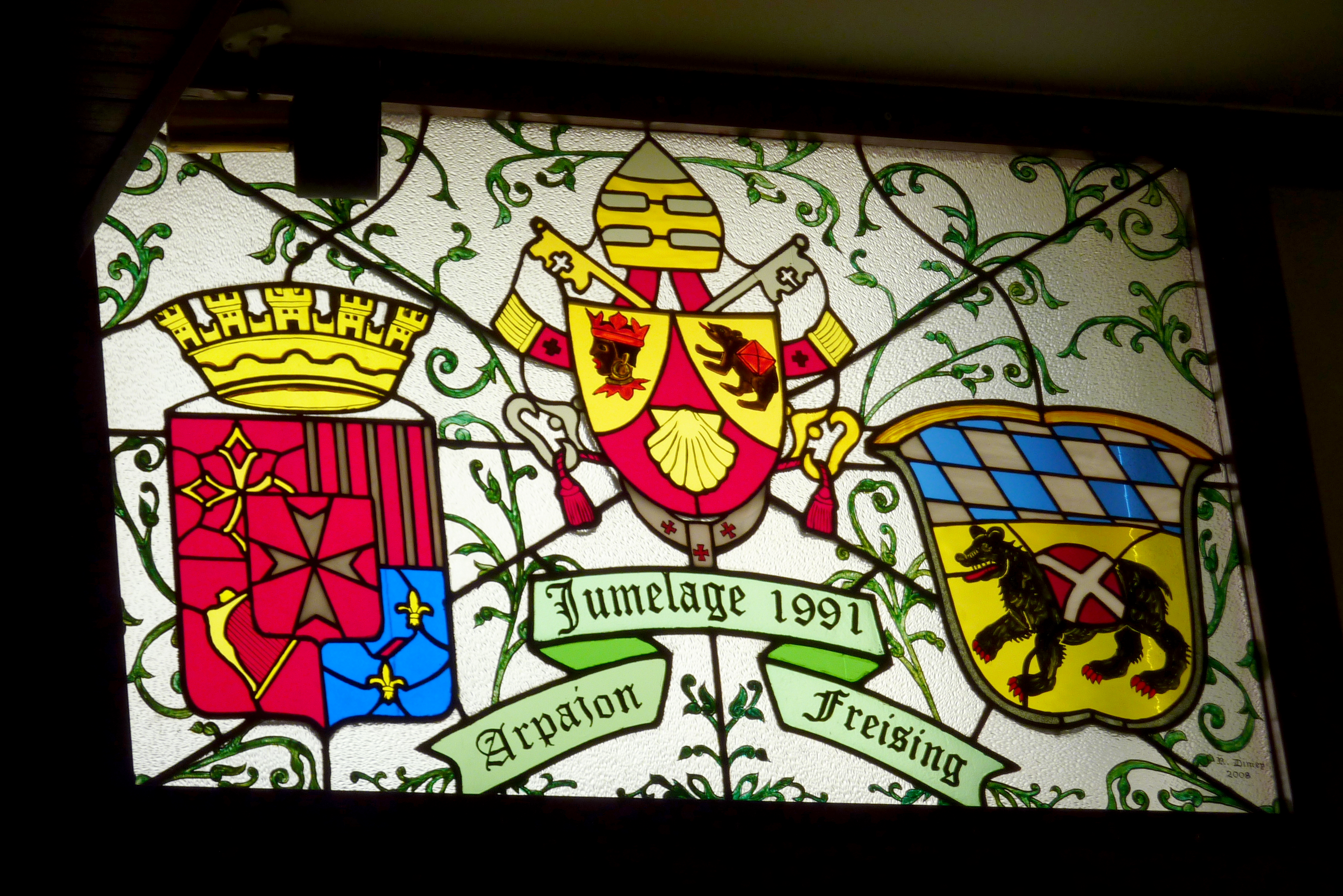

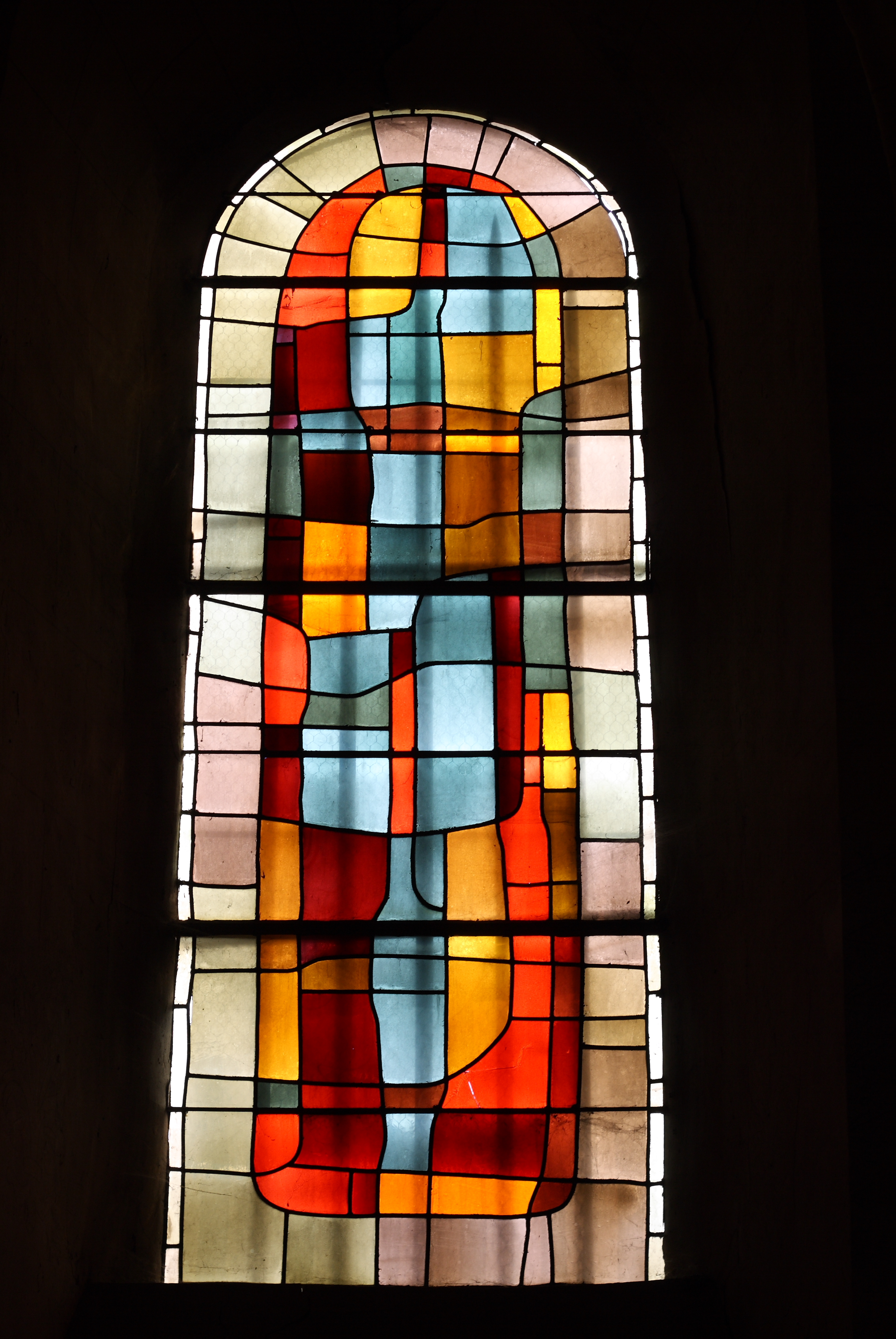

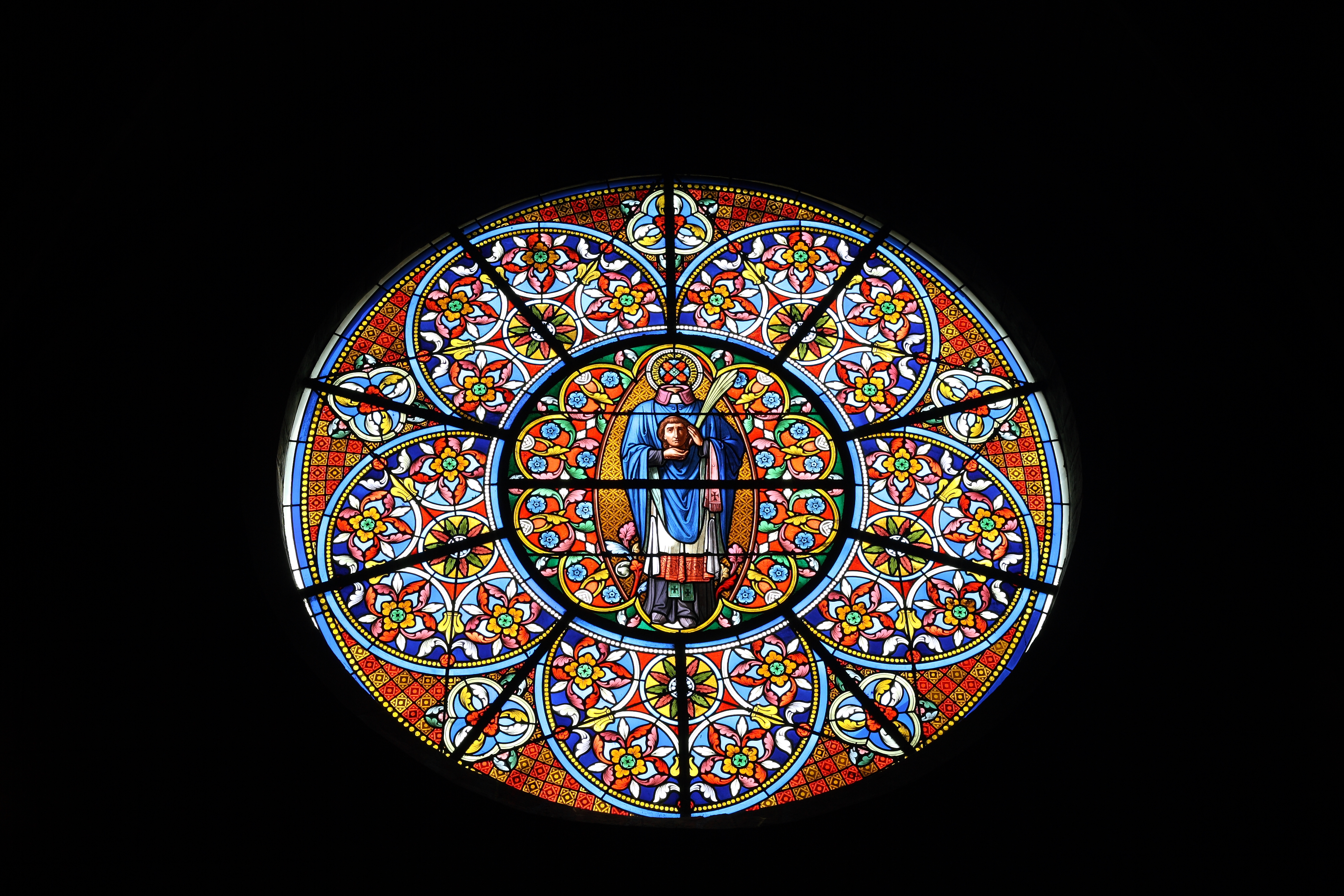

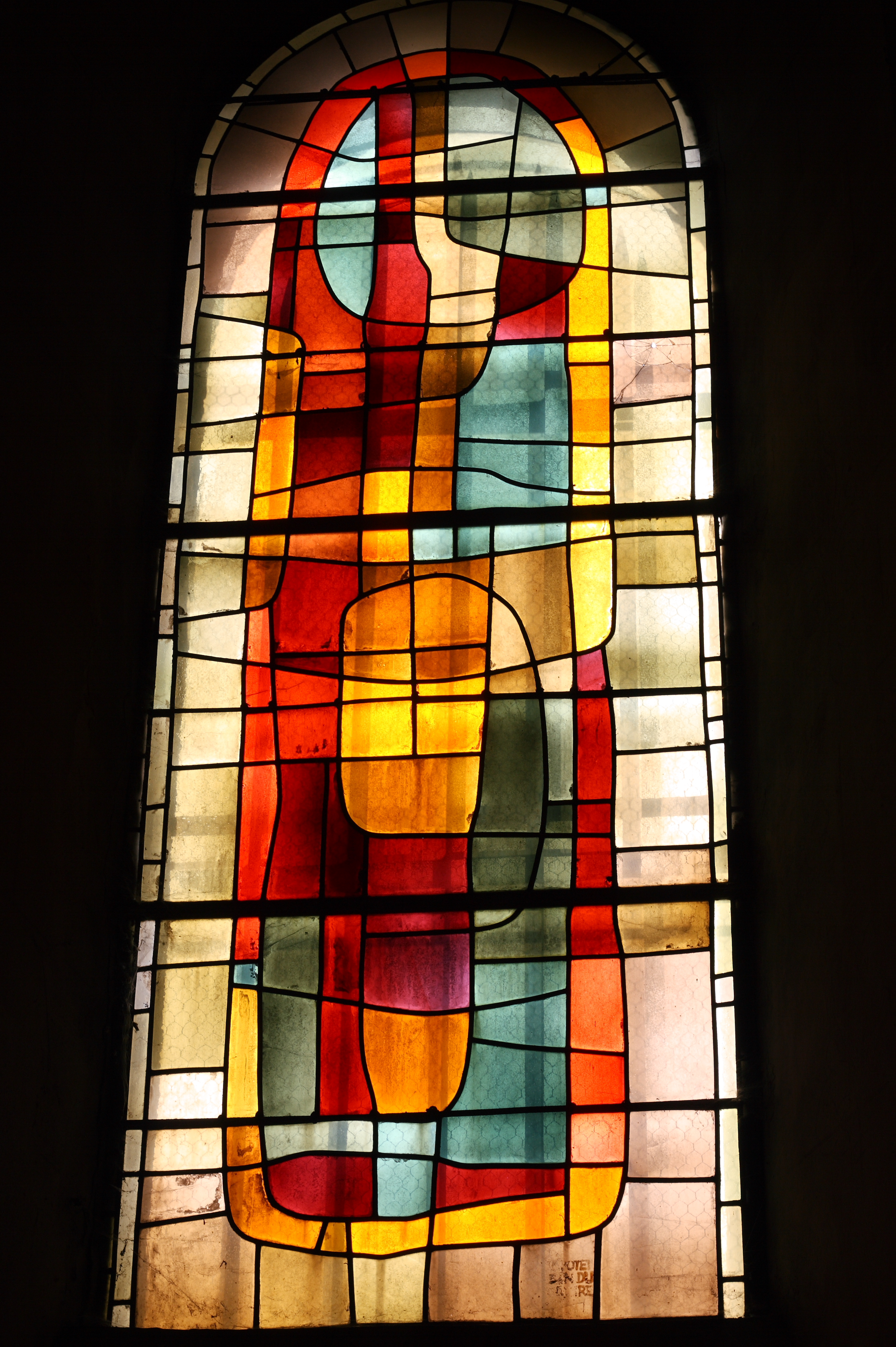

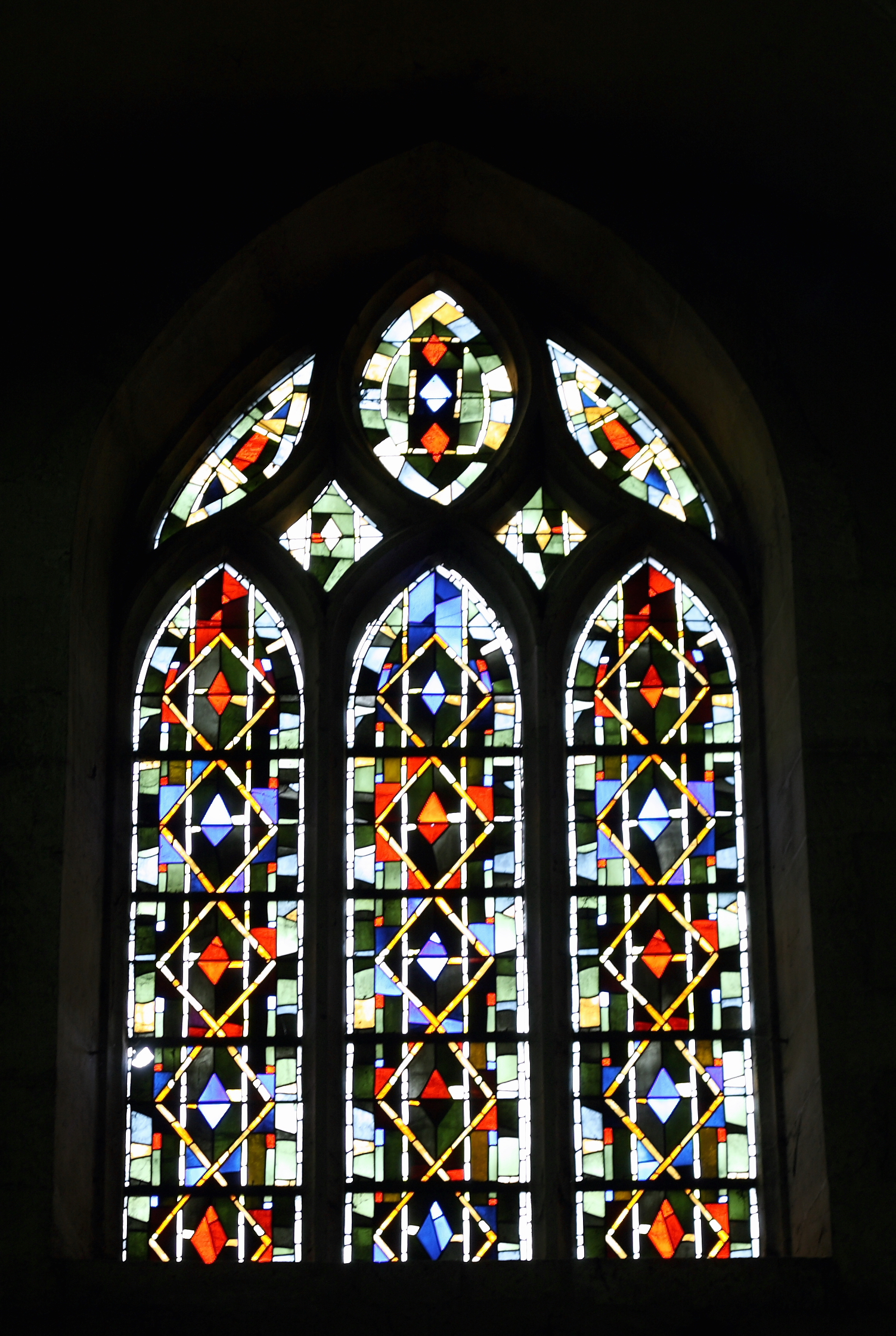

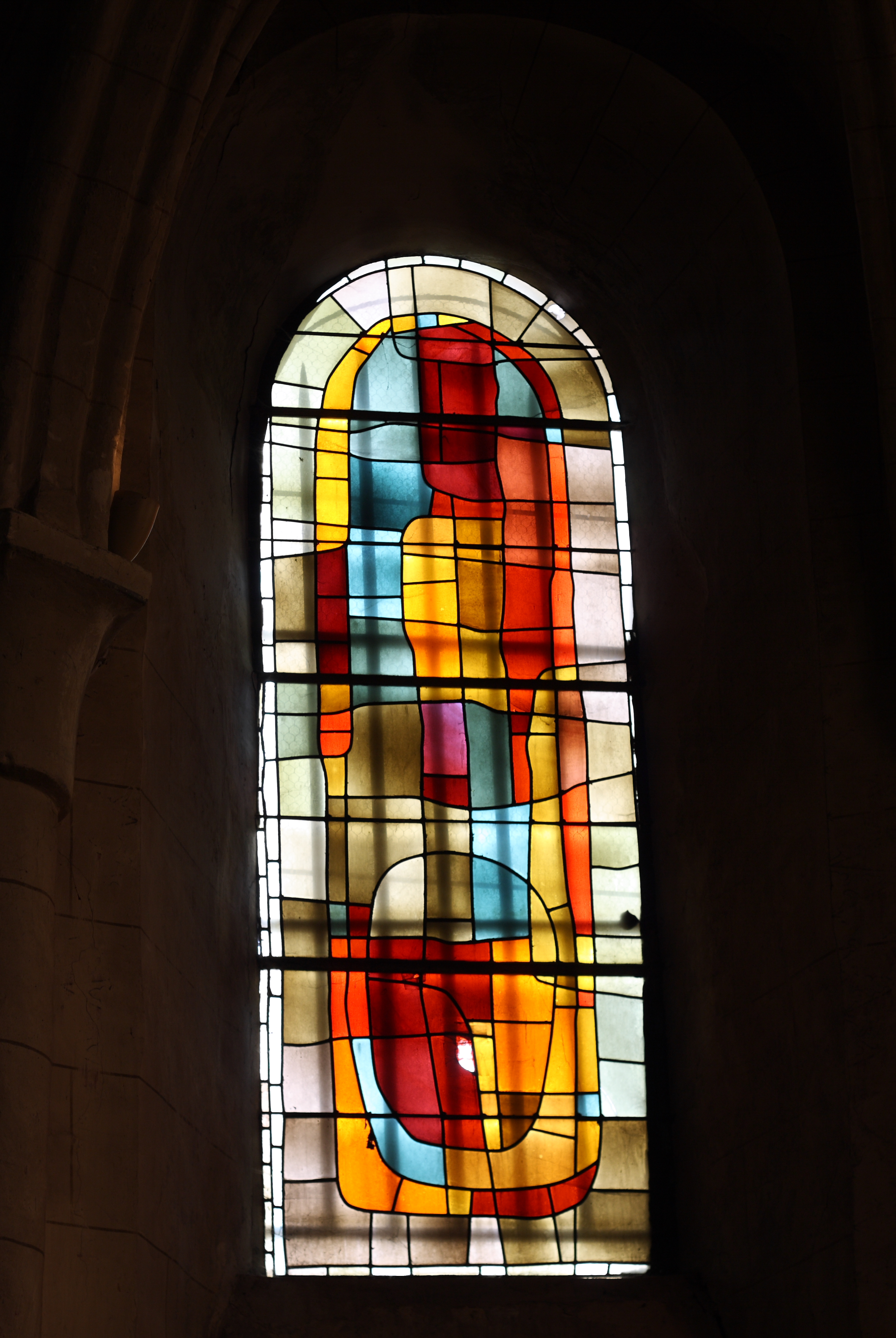

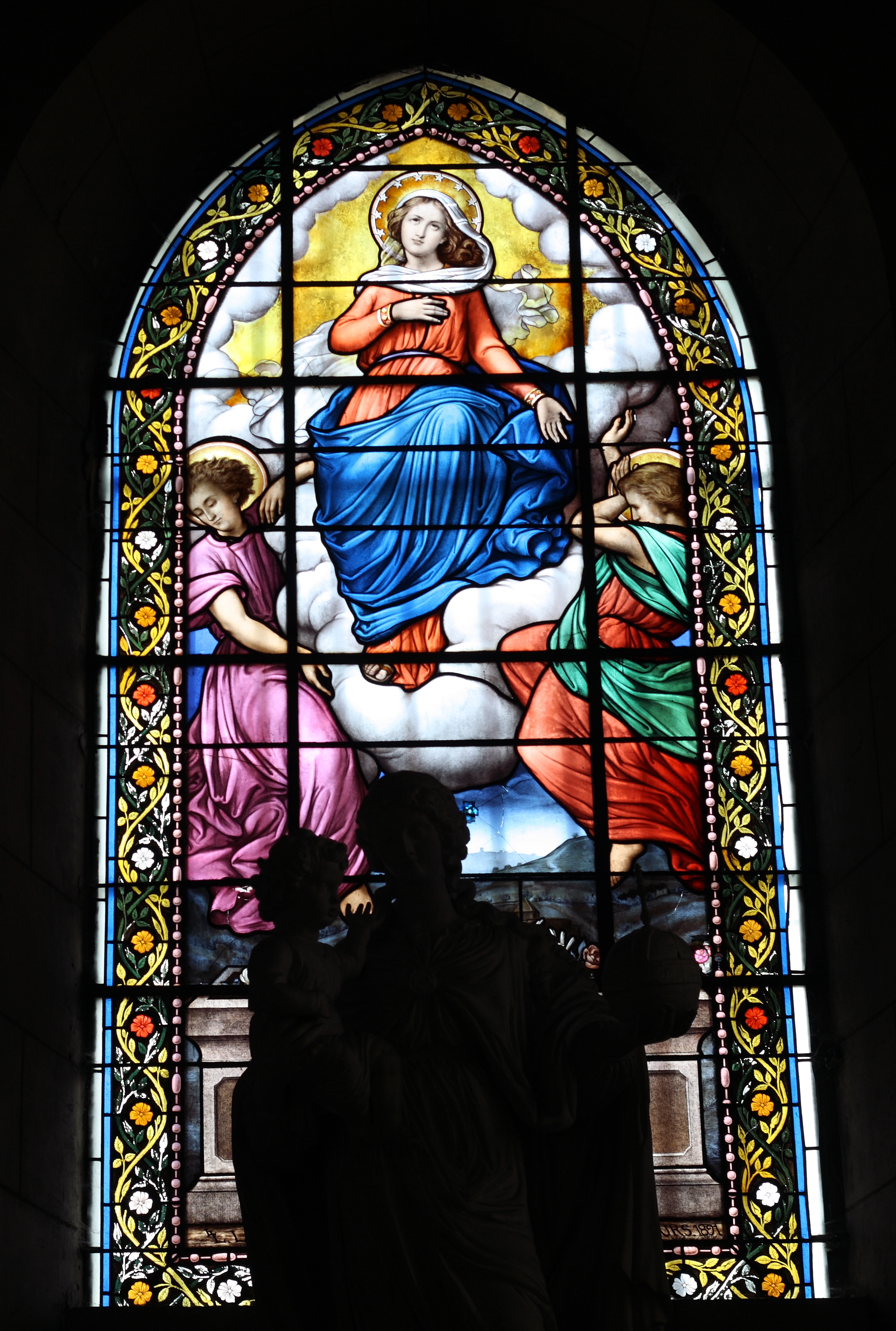

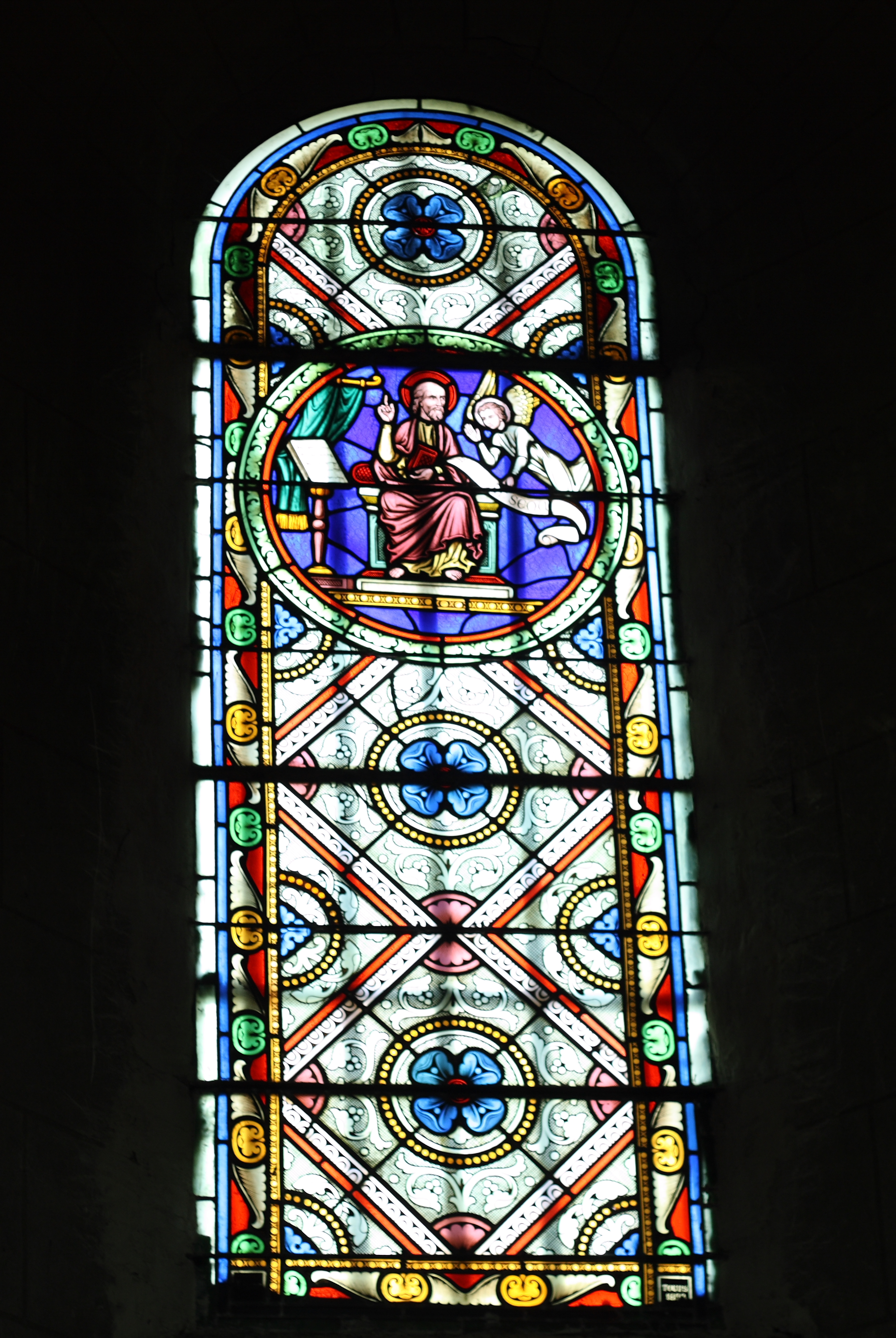

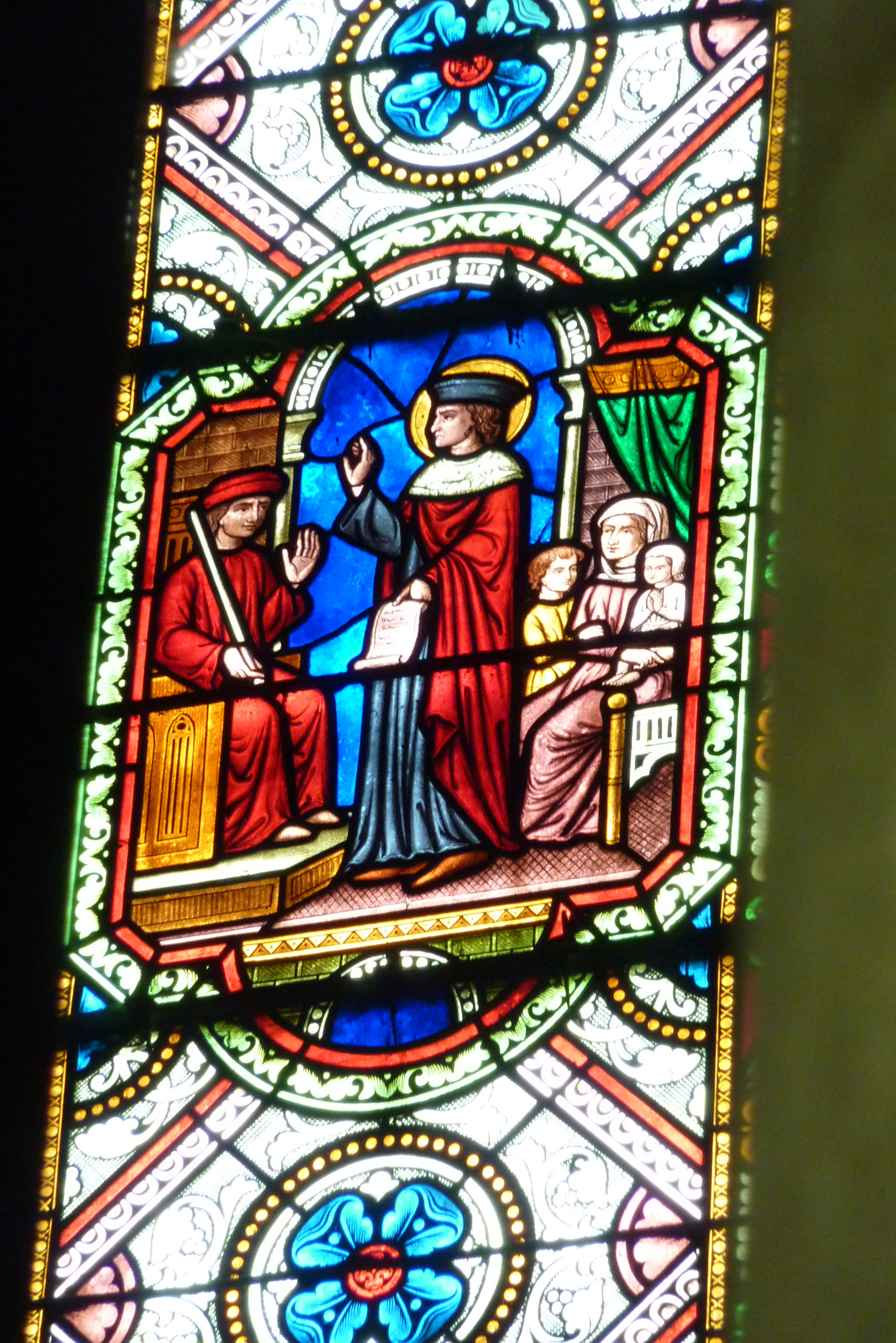

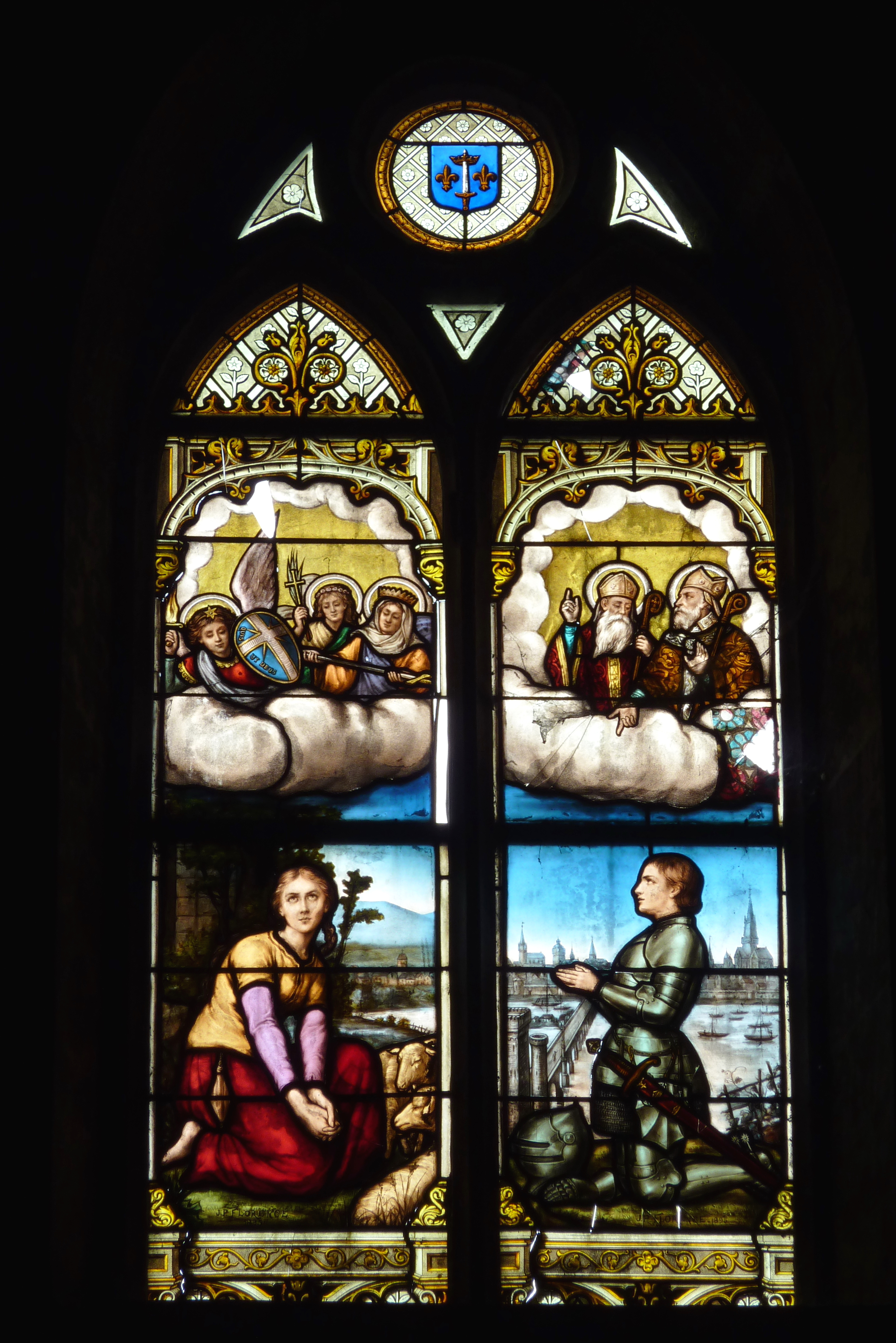

=== Environmental heritage ===
Although 80% of the communal area is urban there are still some parks and public gardens. The oldest, at 4 rue Henri Barbusse, was created in the 19th century. Five other parks adorn the city: Chevrier Park, Freising Park, 100 Grande Rue Park, Théophile Guesdon Park, and Rémarde Park. The banks of the Rémarde and the Orge are still mostly natural. This environmental heritage has allowed Arpajon to be rewarded by three flowers in the competition of cities and villages in Bloom since 2008.

The north-west of the commune still has cultural areas recalling the agricultural character of the town that specialised in market gardening.

== Daily life in Arpajon ==
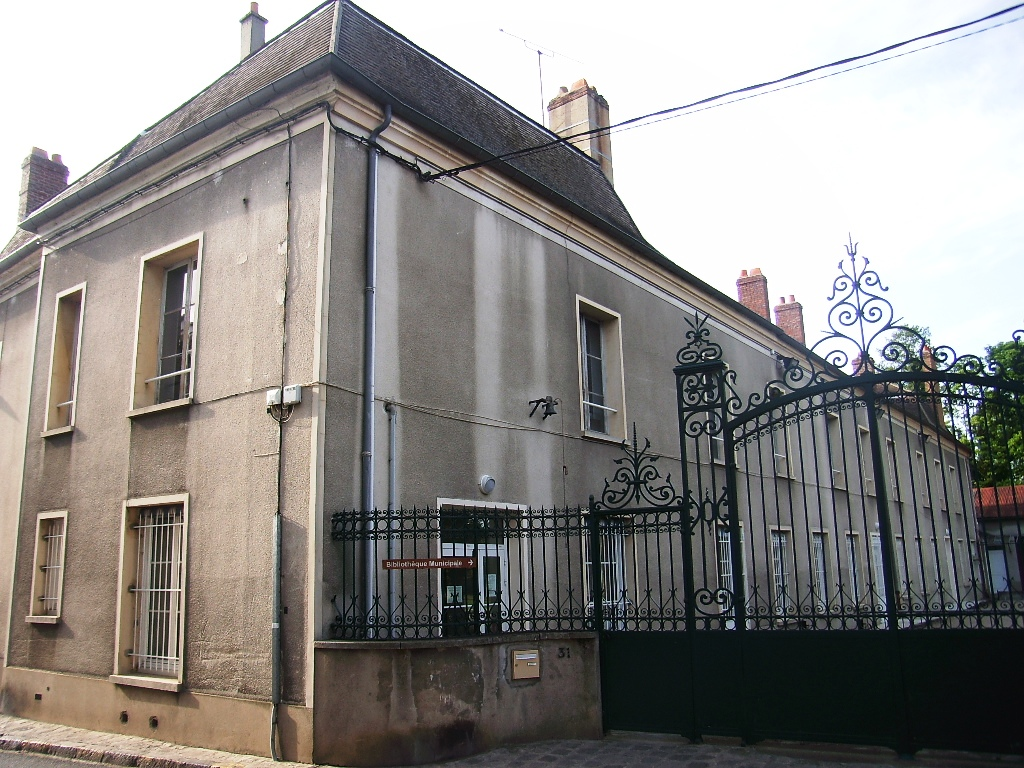
The Municipal Library in the old Chateau stables.

=== Culture ===
For cultural events the commune has the Francval Exhibition Hall. The cinema is popular and has five theatres which sometimes show Arthouse films.

There is a school of music and dance and a library in the old chateau stables.

There are many associations working for the promotion and dissemination of culture.

=== Sports ===
The relatively small size of the commune does not allow it to have any important sports infrastructure. Two stadia are nearby: Gaston-Cornu at Saint-Germain-lès-Arpajon and Louis Babin at La Norville. La Norville also has a swimming pool. There are 19 associations in the commune.

Arpajon town was traversed by the Tour cycliste de l'Essonne in 1977 and was a stage city for the 1999 Tour de France. As well as the Bean Fair the commune also organises a hiking rally and a bicycle race.

=== Festivities ===
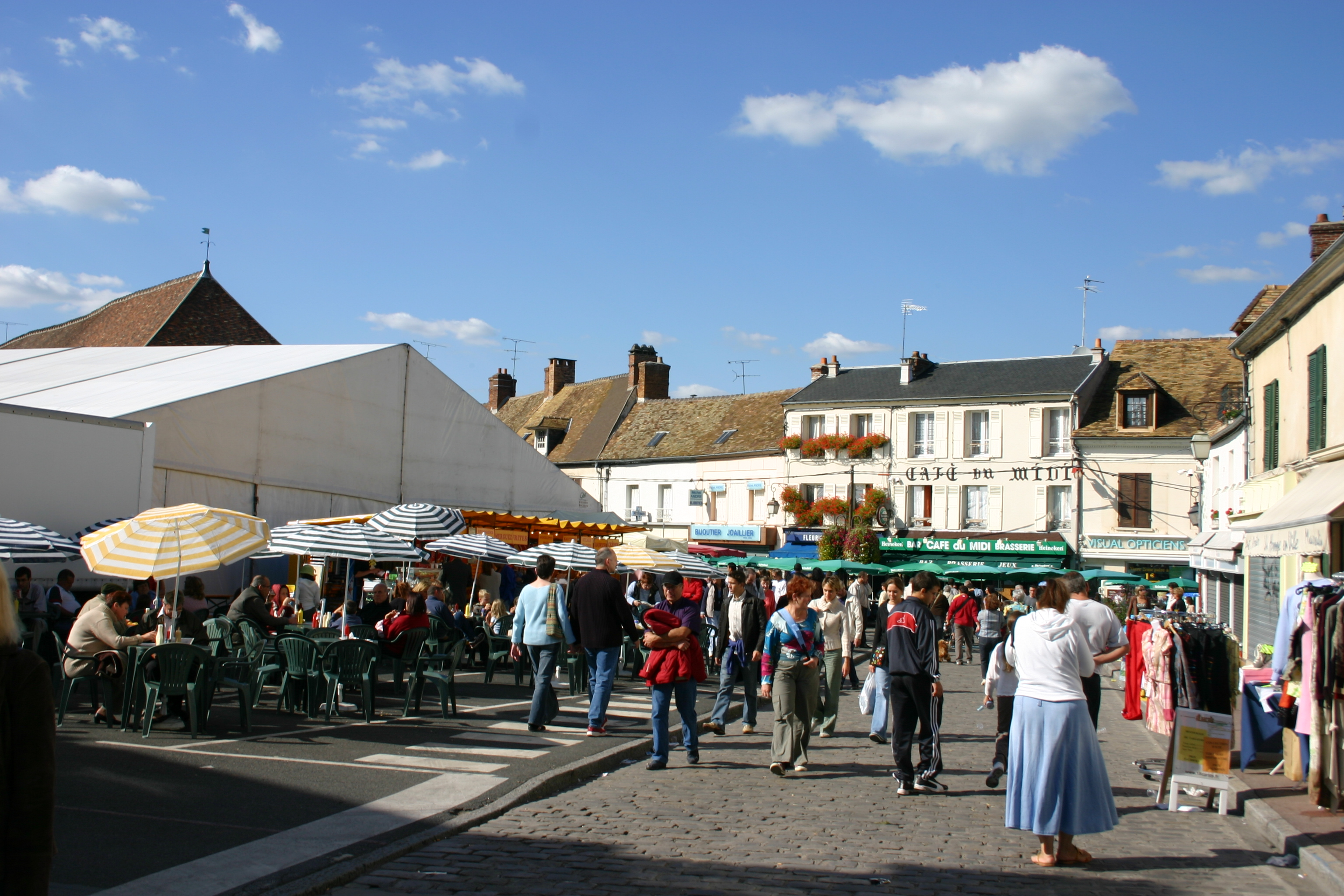
Châtres Square during the Bean Festival

There are two main events each year at Arpajon:

- The Carnival of Bineau, in which a representation of the steward is burned in Châtres Square, takes place every year on the first Sunday of March.
- The Foire aux haricots (The Bean Festival) started in 1922 and was recognised as a national fair in 1970. It is a trade and crafts event which is held every third weekend in September over 4 days in memory of the market gardening that there was in the commune in the past. The bean celebrated here is the chevrier.

There are other national events such as the Fête de la Musique (Festival of Music) which are celebrated in the commune.

=== Places of Worship ===
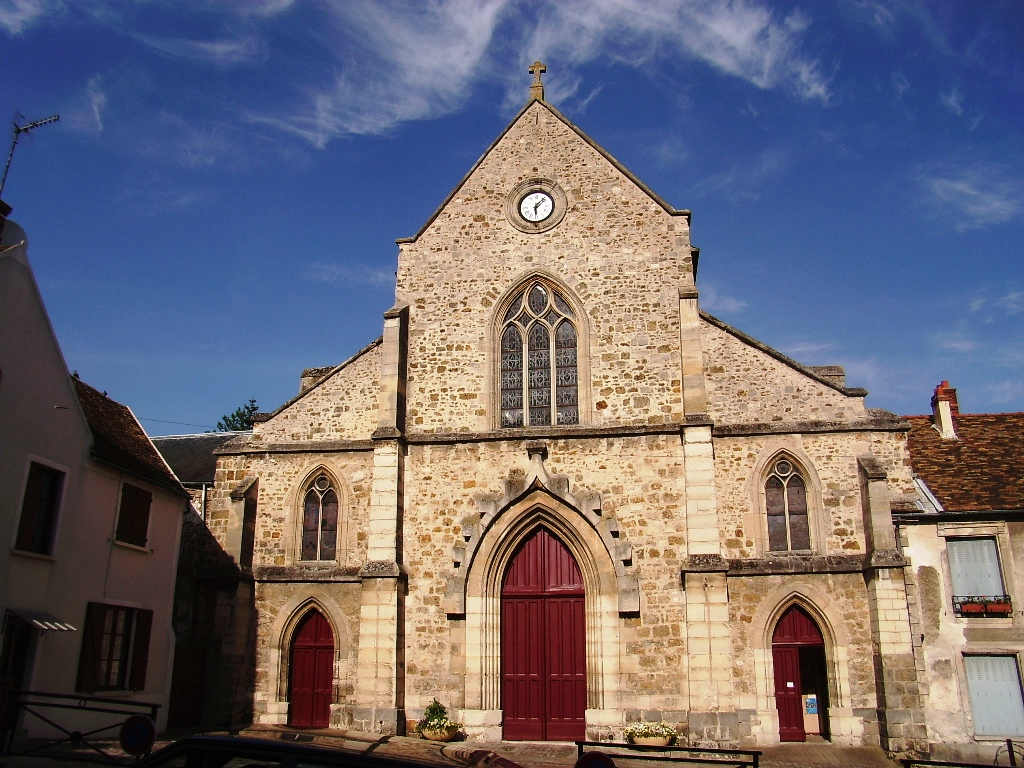
The Church of Saint-Clément.

Arpajon Catholic parish is part of the Diocese of Évry-Corbeil-Essonnes and the deanery of Trois-Vallées-Arpajon. The church is dedicated to Pope Clement I.

There is a Protestant evangelical church in the commune. Other denominations do not have a place of worship in the commune.

=== Media ===
The Cœur Essonne (Heart of Essonne) edition of the weekly Le Républicain contains local information on Arpajon. Despite its enclosed location geographically, the commune lies in the transmission area of France 3 Paris Île-de-France Centre, IDF1, and Télévision Île-de-France (Télif).

=== Arpajon in arts and culture ===
The proximity of Paris and the nearby presence of film studios at Saint-Germain-lès-Arpajon has meant that Arpajon has appeared in various films:

- In 1960 the covered market and the Porte de Paris appeared in Le Président by Henri Verneuil
- In 1962 the Thirion shop appeared in La Vie à la française (French Life)
- In 1966 the commune appeared in Paris brûle-t-il ? (Is Paris burning?) by René Clément

The action of the film 3 zéros (Shooting Stars) by Fabien Onteniente released in 2002 137 takes place in Arpajon, but only one scene is set there: Ticky Holgado toured the market place by bicycle.

There is a legend that the name Bineau of a carnivalesque character recalls a steward who was granted a Droit du seigneur on the ladies of the village and was burned alive as punishment.

Honoré de Balzac located part of his novel Un début dans la vie (A start in life) in Arpajon: "As for Mr. Serisy, he did not emigrate during the Revolution, he went to his Serizy land at Arpajon, where the respect that he had from his father saved him from all evil"

The character of a "Countess of Arpajon" appears in the work À la recherche du temps perdu (In Search of Lost Time) by Marcel Proust in the volumes Sodome et Gomorrhe (Sodom and Gomorrah) and Le Temps retrouvé (Time Regained).

The Chevrier bean is also called the bean of Arpajon.

== Notable people linked to the commune ==
- Saint Corbinian(680-730), Bishop and Catholic Saint lived there.
- René Liger (?-1801), Priest and pamphletiste lived there.
- Louis Bérard (1783-1859), politician and was the MP for there.
- Félix Potin (1820-1871), businessman, was born there.
- Charles Truche (1870-1951), microbiologist, discovered an anti-pneumococcal serum and a method of culture that bears his name (milieu T), pioneer of avian influenza, was born and buried in the commune.
- Louis Babin (8 August 1889 – 15 December 1941), doctor and radiologist. Denounced the Germans as communist. He was shot with 8 others at Camp de Choisel.
- Camille Danguillaume (1919-1950), racing cyclist, died in the commune.
- David Galula (1919-1967), Lieutenant-colonel, died in the commune.
- François-Alexandre Galepide called Moustache (1929-1987), musician and comedian, died in the commune.
- Joël Robuchon (1945-), famous chef, received the Gold Medal of the City of Arpajon in 1966.
- René Fontaine (1946-), chocolatier, worked sometimes at Arpajon.
- François-Michel Gonnot (1949-), politician, born in the commune.
- Wadeck Stanczak (1961-), actor, born in the commune.
- Emmanuel Collard (1971-), racing driver, born in the commune.
- Sébastien Hamel (1975-), footballer, born in the commune.

== See also ==
- Communes of the Essonne department
