= Leuville-sur-Orge =

Commune in Île-de-France, France

- Commune
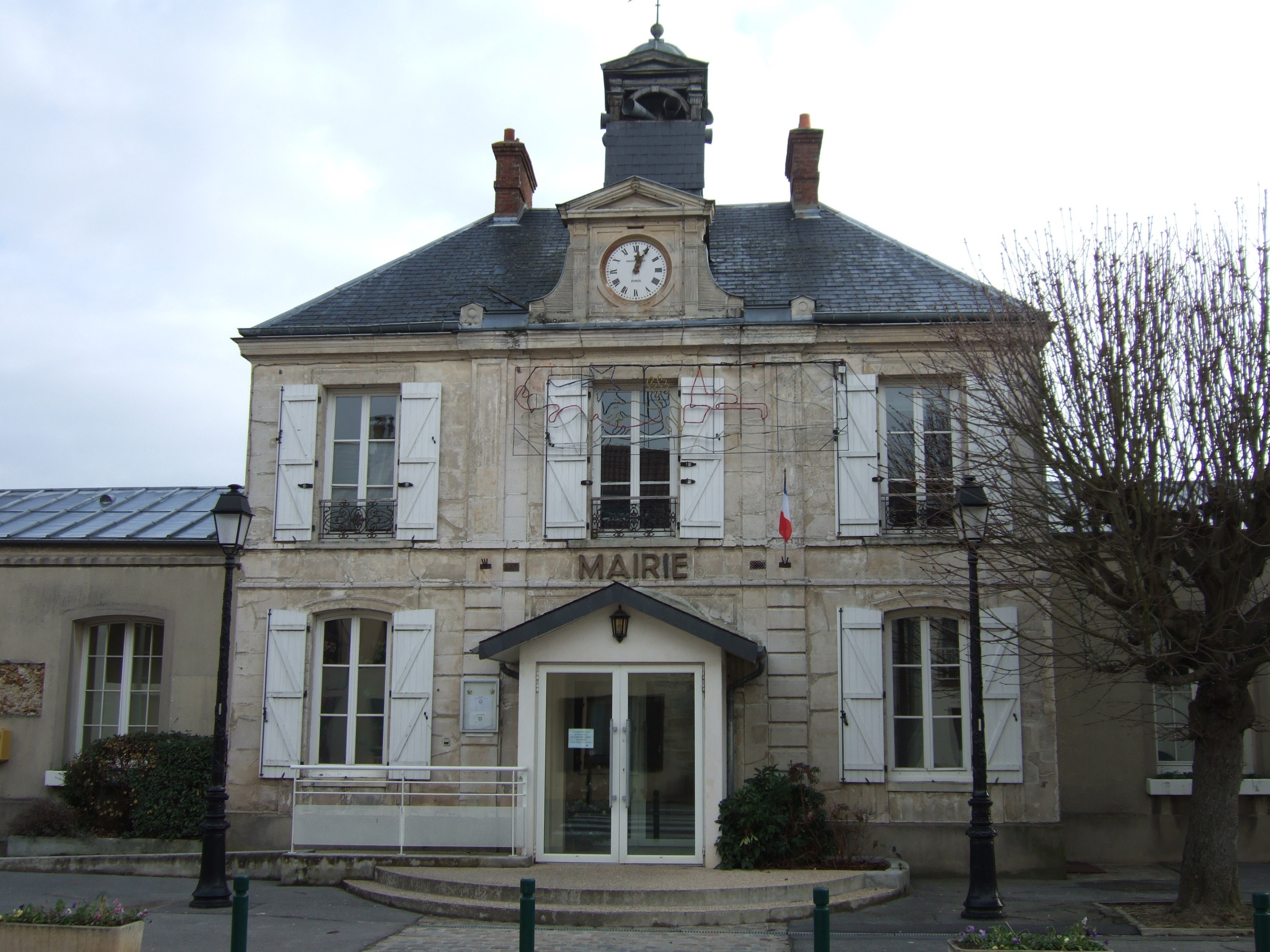
- The town hall in Leuville

- Coat of arms
- Location of Leuville-sur-Orge
- Location within France Location within Île-de-France (region)
- Coordinates: 48°37′03″N 2°15′57″E
- Country: France
- Region: Île-de-France
- Department: Essonne
- Arrondissement: Palaiseau
- Canton: Arpajon
- Intercommunality: CA Cœur d'Essonne

Government
  - Mayor (2020–2026): Éric Braive
- Area^{1}: 2.49 km^{2} (0.96 sq mi)
- Elevation: 35 m (115 ft)
- Highest elevation: 92 m (302 ft)
- Lowest elevation: 42 m (138 ft)
- Population (2023): 4,271
  - Density: 1,720/km^{2} (4,440/sq mi)
- Demonym: Leuvillois
- Time zone: UTC+01:00 (CET)
  - Summer (DST): UTC+02:00 (CEST)
- INSEE/Postal code: 91333 /91310
- Website: www.leuville.fr
- ^{1} French Land Register data, which excludes lakes, ponds, glaciers > 1 km^{2} (0.386 sq mi or 247 acres) and river estuaries.

Leuville-sur-Orge (French pronunciation: [løvil syʁ ɔʁʒ]; lit. 'Leuville-on-Orge') or simply Leuville is a commune 31 km (19 mi) south of Paris, France. It is situated in the centre of the Essonne department in the Île-de-France region. In 2023, it had a population of 4,271. It is best known for having hosted the 1921–1954 Government of the Democratic Republic of Georgia in Exile.

== Geography ==
It is situated 25 kilometres (16 miles) south of Paris. Neighbouring towns are: Linas, Longpont-sur-Orge, Brétigny-sur-Orge, and Saint-Germain-lès-Arpajon. It is served by the RN20 and A104 motorways.

== History ==
In the Middle Ages, Leuville-sur-Orge belonged to the fiefdom of Montlhéry. The Leuvillois took part in feudal wars on behalf of the fiefdom of Montlhéry and the abbey of Longpont. During the famous battle of Montlhéry (13 July 1465) between Louis XI and Charles le Téméraire, the population of Leuville (approximately 50) was halved.

During the 16th century the village belonged to the Olivier de Leuville family who built a castle. The castle now no longer exists nor do any remains. The castle (that can be seen today) of Leuville dates back to the 18th century.

During the French Revolution (1789–1799), Leuville served as a refuge for Lacépède, protégé of Buffon and a knowledgeable botanist, whilst fleeing the reign of terror in Paris.

In 1922 it was a refuge of the then exiled Georgian leader Noe Zhordania and his government-in-exile who settled there. The 4.5 ha estate where the Georgian government was located was handed over to Georgia by France in 2016.

Leuville used to be a farming community which supplied Paris with agricultural produce. This was helped by its location on the Voie Royale, a major road connecting Orléans and Paris which gave easy access to the nation's capital. Produce was originally transported by foot, then by cart, and eventually by train, thanks to the famous Arpajonnais railroad. The main agricultural produce of the town were potatoes, pumpkins and wine.

== Population ==
Historical population
Year	Pop.	±% p.a.
1968	1,519	—
1975	1,934	+3.51%
1982	1,969	+0.26%
1990	2,463	+2.84%
1999	3,761	+4.82%
2007	4,208	+1.41%
2012	4,074	−0.65%
2017	4,471	+1.88%
2023	4,271	−0.76%
Source: INSEE

Inhabitants of Leuville-sur-Orge are known as Leuvillois (masculine) and Leuvilloises (feminine) in French.

== Twin towns ==
- Mtskheta, Georgia, 2001

== See also ==
- Leuville Cemetery
- Georgian-French day of Leuville-sur-Orge
- Communes of the Essonne department
