= Canton of Arpajon =

Coordinates: 48.59°N 2.25°E

The canton of Arpajon is an administrative division of the Essonne department, Île-de-France region, northern France. Its borders were modified at the French canton reorganisation which came into effect in March 2015. Its seat is in Arpajon.

It consists of the following communes:

1. Arpajon
2. Avrainville
3. Boissy-sous-Saint-Yon
4. Bouray-sur-Juine
5. Bruyères-le-Châtel
6. Cheptainville
7. Égly
8. Guibeville
9. Janville-sur-Juine
10. Lardy
11. Leuville-sur-Orge
12. La Norville
13. Ollainville
14. Saint-Germain-lès-Arpajon
15. Saint-Yon
16. Torfou
