= Communauté d'agglomération Cœur d'Essonne =

Coordinates: 48.64°N 2.33°E

Cœur d'Essonne
- Communauté d'agglomération
- Country: France
- Region: Île-de-France
- Department: Essonne
- No. of communes: {{{nbcomm}}}
- Established: 2016
- Area: 132.7 km^{2} (51.2 sq mi)
- Population (2018): 201,873
  - Density: 1,521/km^{2} (3,940/sq mi)

Communauté d'agglomération Cœur d'Essonne (also: Cœur d'Essonne Agglomération) is an agglomeration community, an intercommunal structure, centred on the city of Sainte-Geneviève-des-Bois, a southern suburb of Paris. It is located in the Essonne department, in the Île-de-France region, northern France. It was created in January 2016. Its area is 132.7 km^{2}. Its population was 201,873 in 2018.

== Composition ==
The communauté d'agglomération consists of the following 21 communes:

1. Arpajon
2. Avrainville
3. Brétigny-sur-Orge
4. Breuillet
5. Bruyères-le-Châtel
6. Cheptainville
7. Égly
8. Fleury-Mérogis
9. Guibeville
10. Leuville-sur-Orge
11. Longpont-sur-Orge
12. Marolles-en-Hurepoix
13. Morsang-sur-Orge
14. La Norville
15. Ollainville
16. Le Plessis-Pâté
17. Sainte-Geneviève-des-Bois
18. Saint-Germain-lès-Arpajon
19. Saint-Michel-sur-Orge
20. Villemoisson-sur-Orge
21. Villiers-sur-Orge
