= Saint-Germain-lès-Arpajon =

Commune in Île-de-France, France

- Commune
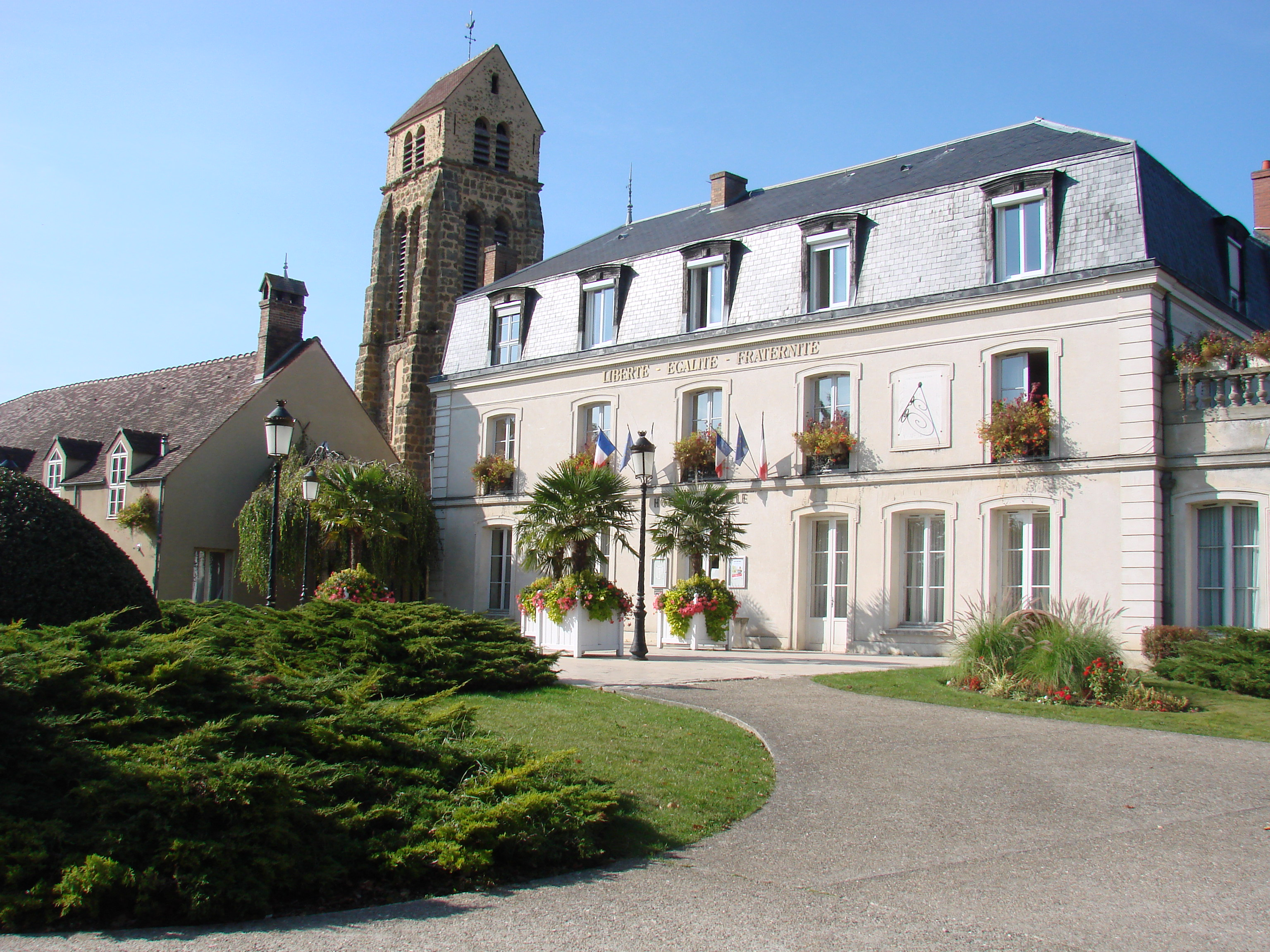
- The town hall and church in Saint-Germain-lès-Arpajon

- Coat of arms
- Location of Saint-Germain-lès-Arpajon
- Location within France Location within Île-de-France (region)
- Coordinates: 48°35′41″N 2°15′21″E
- Country: France
- Region: Île-de-France
- Department: Essonne
- Arrondissement: Palaiseau
- Canton: Arpajon
- Intercommunality: CA Cœur d'Essonne

Government
  - Mayor (2020–2026): Norbert Santin
- Area^{1}: 6.31 km^{2} (2.44 sq mi)
- Elevation: 82 m (269 ft)
- Highest elevation: 101 m (331 ft)
- Lowest elevation: 42 m (138 ft)
- Population (2023): 11,623
  - Density: 1,840/km^{2} (4,770/sq mi)
- Time zone: UTC+01:00 (CET)
  - Summer (DST): UTC+02:00 (CEST)
- INSEE/Postal code: 91552 /91180
- ^{1} French Land Register data, which excludes lakes, ponds, glaciers > 1 km^{2} (0.386 sq mi or 247 acres) and river estuaries.

Saint-Germain-lès-Arpajon (French pronunciation: [sɛ̃ ʒɛʁmɛ̃ lɛ.z‿aʁpaʒɔ̃], literally Saint-Germain near Arpajon) is a commune in the Essonne department. It is a suburb of Paris located 30 km (19 mi) south of Paris via the N20, and 20 km (12 mi) north of Étampes.

== History ==
- Corbinian founded a religious community in the 7th century
- Up into the 13th century, Saint-Germain was a dependence of the châtellenie of Montlhéry
- In the 16th century, Saint-Germain was an estate of the lords of Granville
- In the 18th century, it was an estate of the lords of Noailles
- In 1720, the commune takes its current name following the acquisition of the commune of Châtres by Louis de Severac, Marquis d' Arpajon-sur-Cère (father of Anne d'Arpajon, comtesse de Noailles). It was previously called Saint-Germain-lès-Châtres).

== Population ==
Its inhabitants are called Germinois in French.

Historical population
Year	Pop.	±% p.a.
1968	4,105	—
1975	5,949	+5.44%
1982	6,217	+0.63%
1990	7,607	+2.55%
1999	8,227	+0.87%
2007	9,146	+1.33%
2012	9,412	+0.58%
2017	10,707	+2.61%
2023	11,623	+1.38%
Source: INSEE

== See also ==
- Communes of the Essonne department
