= Cheptainville =

Commune in Île-de-France, France

- Commune
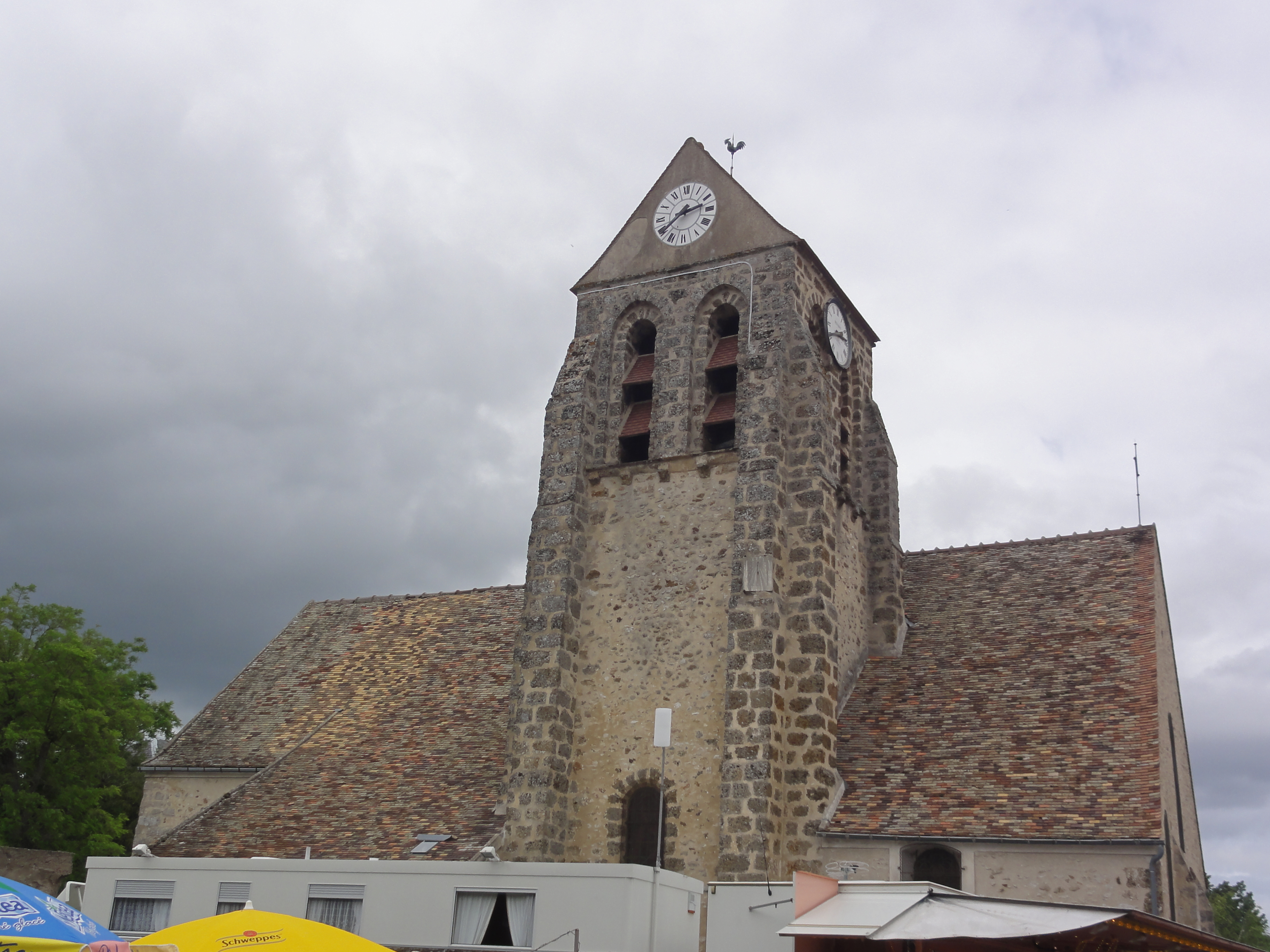
- The church in Cheptainville

- Coat of arms
- Location of Cheptainville
- Location within France Location within Île-de-France (region)
- Coordinates: 48°33′10″N 2°15′57″E
- Country: France
- Region: Île-de-France
- Department: Essonne
- Arrondissement: Palaiseau
- Canton: Arpajon
- Intercommunality: CA Cœur d'Essonne

Government
  - Mayor (2020–2026): Kim Delmotte
- Area^{1}: 7.15 km^{2} (2.76 sq mi)
- Highest elevation: 152 m (499 ft)
- Lowest elevation: 77 m (253 ft)
- Population (2023): 2,204
  - Density: 308/km^{2} (798/sq mi)
- Time zone: UTC+01:00 (CET)
  - Summer (DST): UTC+02:00 (CEST)
- INSEE/Postal code: 91156 /91630
- ^{1} French Land Register data, which excludes lakes, ponds, glaciers > 1 km^{2} (0.386 sq mi or 247 acres) and river estuaries.

Cheptainville (French pronunciation: [ʃɛptɛ̃vil]) is a commune in the Essonne department in Île-de-France in northern France.

== Population ==
Historical population
Year	Pop.	±% p.a.
1968	734	—
1975	1,015	+4.74%
1982	1,165	+1.99%
1990	1,361	+1.96%
1999	1,462	+0.80%
2007	1,824	+2.80%
2012	1,896	+0.78%
2017	2,055	+1.62%
2023	2,204	+1.17%
Source: INSEE

Inhabitants of Cheptainville are known as Cheptainvillois in French.

== See also ==
- Communes of the Essonne department
