= La Norville =

Commune in Île-de-France, France

- Commune
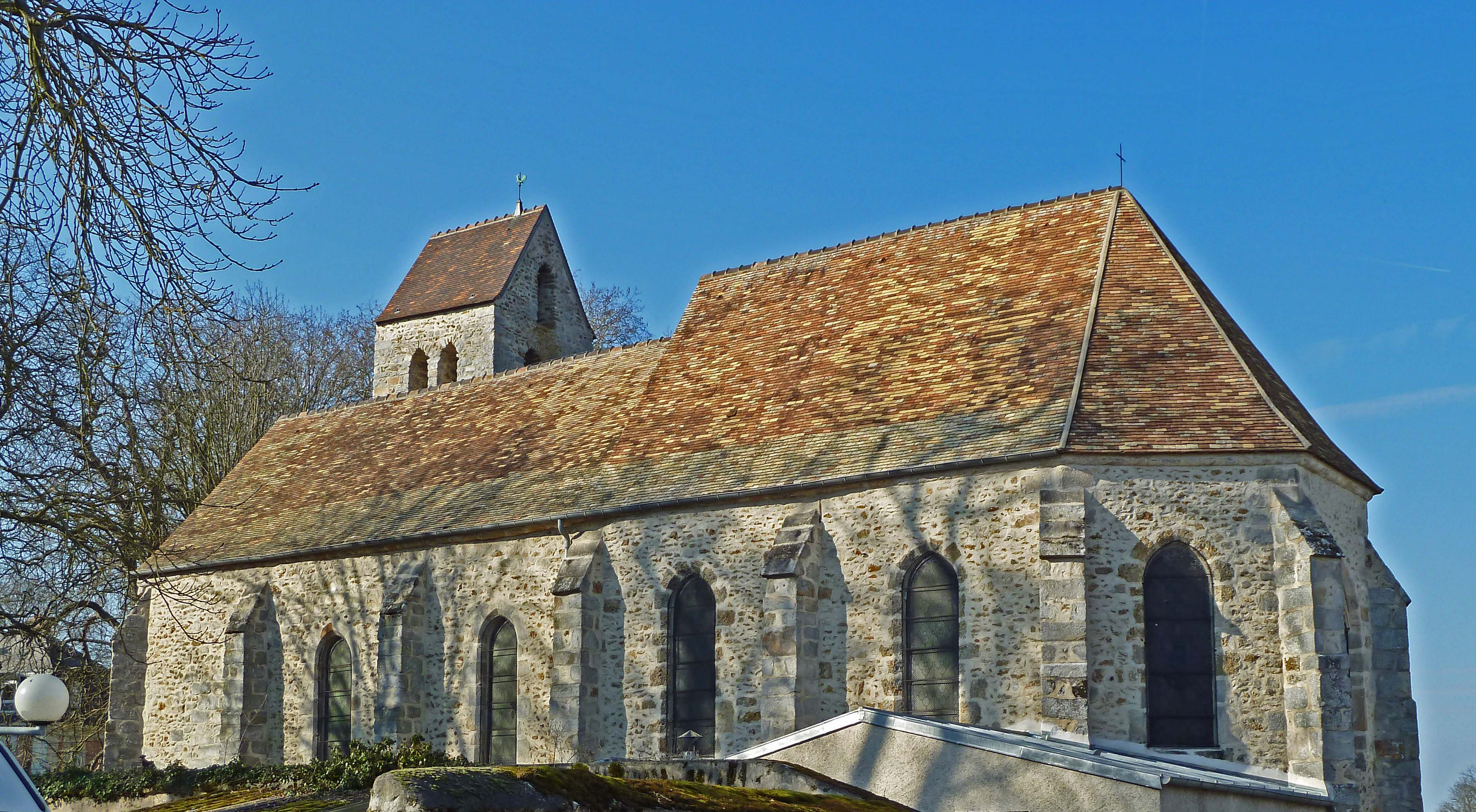
- The church of Saint-Denis, in La Norville

- Coat of arms
- Location of La Norville
- Location within France Location within Île-de-France (region)
- Coordinates: 48°35′10″N 2°15′30″E
- Country: France
- Region: Île-de-France
- Department: Essonne
- Arrondissement: Palaiseau
- Canton: Arpajon
- Intercommunality: CA Cœur d'Essonne

Government
  - Mayor (2020–2026): Fabienne Leguicher
- Area^{1}: 4.52 km^{2} (1.75 sq mi)
- Highest elevation: 99 m (325 ft)
- Lowest elevation: 47 m (154 ft)
- Population (2023): 4,268
  - Density: 944/km^{2} (2,450/sq mi)
- Time zone: UTC+01:00 (CET)
  - Summer (DST): UTC+02:00 (CEST)
- INSEE/Postal code: 91457 /91290
- ^{1} French Land Register data, which excludes lakes, ponds, glaciers > 1 km^{2} (0.386 sq mi or 247 acres) and river estuaries.

La Norville (French pronunciation: [la nɔʁvil]) is a commune in the Essonne department in Île-de-France in northern France.

== Population ==
Historical population
Year	Pop.	±% p.a.
1968	1,687	—
1975	2,035	+2.72%
1982	2,318	+1.88%
1990	3,822	+6.45%
1999	3,944	+0.35%
2007	4,009	+0.20%
2012	4,083	+0.37%
2017	4,097	+0.07%
2023	4,268	+0.68%
Source: INSEE

Inhabitants of La Norville are known as Norvillois in French.

== See also ==
- Communes of the Essonne department
