= Avrainville, Essonne =

Commune in Île-de-France, France

Avrainville
- Commune
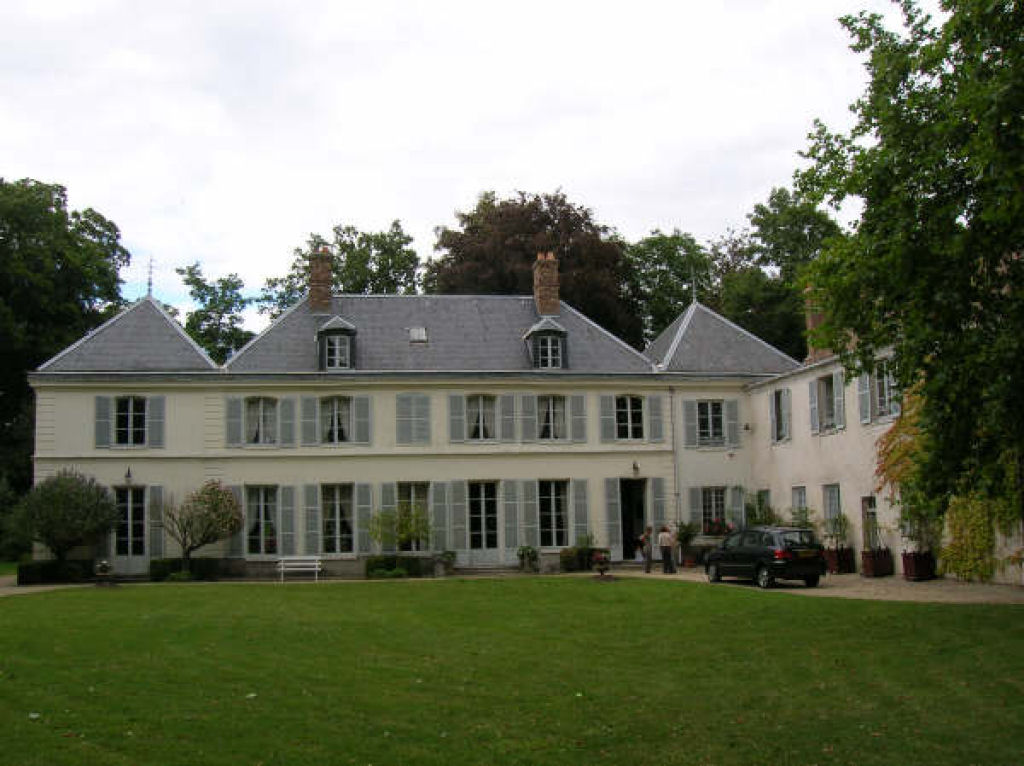
- The Chateau du Merle Blanc, in Avrainville

- Coat of arms
- Location of Avrainville
- Location within France Location within Île-de-France (region)
- Coordinates: 48°33′45″N 2°14′56″E
- Country: France
- Region: Île-de-France
- Department: Essonne
- Arrondissement: Palaiseau
- Canton: Arpajon
- Intercommunality: CA Cœur d'Essonne Agglomération

Government
  - Mayor (2020–2026): Philippe Le Fol
- Area^{1}: 9.14 km^{2} (3.53 sq mi)
- Highest elevation: 154 m (505 ft)
- Lowest elevation: 81 m (266 ft)
- Population (2023): 1,052
  - Density: 115/km^{2} (298/sq mi)
- Time zone: UTC+01:00 (CET)
  - Summer (DST): UTC+02:00 (CEST)
- INSEE/Postal code: 91041 /91630
- ^{1} French Land Register data, which excludes lakes, ponds, glaciers > 1 km^{2} (0.386 sq mi or 247 acres) and river estuaries.

Avrainville (French pronunciation: [avʁɛ̃vil]) is a commune in the Essonne department in Île-de-France in northern France. Popular places to visit nearby include Versailles Palace at 28 km and Catacombs at 31 km. It is the atmospheric setting for Georges Simenon's 1931 novel Night at the Crossroads.

Inhabitants are known as Avrainvillois.

== See also ==
- Communes of the Essonne department
