= Limours =

Commune in Île-de-France, France

- Commune
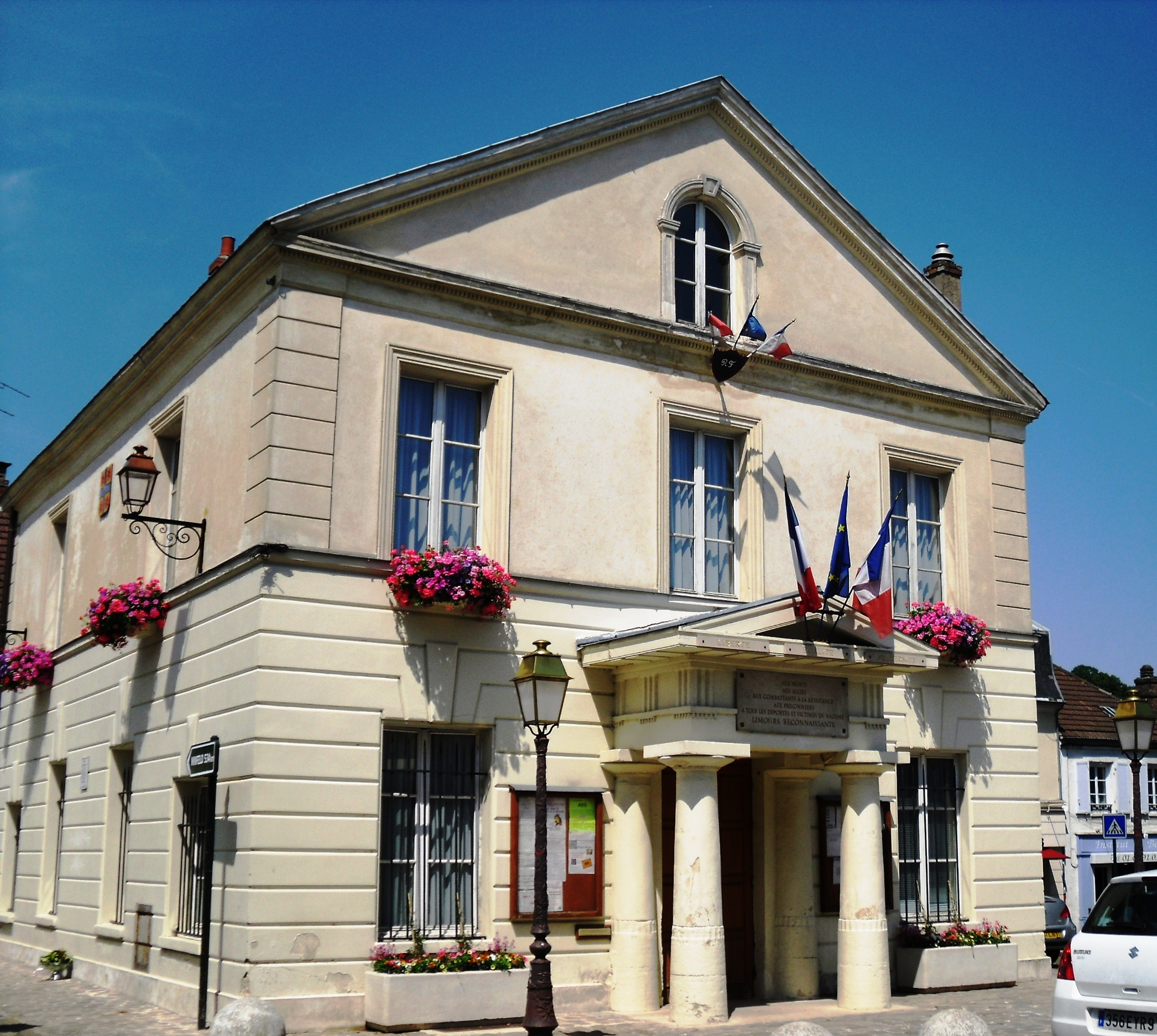
- The town hall in Limours

- Coat of arms
- Location of Limours
- Location within France Location within Île-de-France (region)
- Coordinates: 48°38′45″N 2°04′38″E
- Country: France
- Region: Île-de-France
- Department: Essonne
- Arrondissement: Palaiseau
- Canton: Dourdan
- Intercommunality: Pays de Limours

Government
  - Mayor (2020–2026): Chantal Thiriet
- Area^{1}: 14.25 km^{2} (5.50 sq mi)
- Highest elevation: 177 m (581 ft)
- Lowest elevation: 100 m (330 ft)
- Population (2023): 6,517
  - Density: 457.3/km^{2} (1,184/sq mi)
- Time zone: UTC+01:00 (CET)
  - Summer (DST): UTC+02:00 (CEST)
- INSEE/Postal code: 91338 /91470
- ^{1} French Land Register data, which excludes lakes, ponds, glaciers > 1 km^{2} (0.386 sq mi or 247 acres) and river estuaries.

Limours, often referred to as Limours-en-Hurepoix (French pronunciation: [limuʁ]) is a commune the Essonne department in Île-de-France in northern France.

== Geography ==
Limours is located 30 km (19 mi) from Paris.

== Population ==
Inhabitants of Limours are known as Limouriens in French.

Historical population
Year	Pop.	±% p.a.
1968	2,264	—
1975	4,201	+9.23%
1982	4,774	+1.84%
1990	6,324	+3.58%
1999	6,465	+0.25%
2007	6,344	−0.24%
2012	6,560	+0.67%
2017	6,625	+0.20%
2023	6,517	−0.27%
Source: INSEE

== Pays de Limours ==
Limours gives its name to, and is the most populated town of, the Communauté de communes du Pays de Limours, which aggregates fourteen Essonne communes. The administrative seat of the communauté, however, is in Briis-sous-Forges rather than Limours itself.

List of Pays de Limours member towns:

- Angervilliers
- Boullay-les-Troux
- Briis-sous-Forges
- Courson-Monteloup
- Fontenay-lès-Briis
- Forges-les-Bains
- Gometz-la-Ville
- Janvry
- Les Molières
- Limours
- Pecqueuse
- Saint-Jean-de-Beauregard
- Saint-Maurice-Montcouronne
- Vaugrigneuse

== See also ==
- Communes of the Essonne department
