= Chauffour-lès-Étréchy =

Commune in Île-de-France, France

- Commune
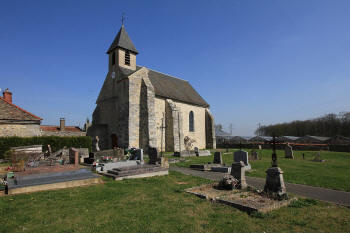
- The church in Chauffour-lès-Étréchy
- Location of Chauffour-lès-Étréchy
- Location within France Location within Île-de-France (region)
- Coordinates: 48°30′10″N 2°10′09″E
- Country: France
- Region: Île-de-France
- Department: Essonne
- Arrondissement: Étampes
- Canton: Dourdan
- Intercommunality: Entre Juine et Renarde

Government
  - Mayor (2020–2026): Fabien Pigeon
- Area^{1}: 4.80 km^{2} (1.85 sq mi)
- Highest elevation: 159 m (522 ft)
- Lowest elevation: 95 m (312 ft)
- Population (2023): 132
  - Density: 27.5/km^{2} (71.2/sq mi)
- Time zone: UTC+01:00 (CET)
  - Summer (DST): UTC+02:00 (CEST)
- INSEE/Postal code: 91148 /91580
- ^{1} French Land Register data, which excludes lakes, ponds, glaciers > 1 km^{2} (0.386 sq mi or 247 acres) and river estuaries.

Chauffour-lès-Étréchy (French pronunciation: [ʃofuʁ lɛ.z‿etʁeʃi], literally Chauffour near Étréchy) is a commune in the Essonne department in Île-de-France in northern France.

Inhabitants of Chauffour-lès-Étréchy are known as Calidusiens.

== See also ==
- Communes of the Essonne department
