= Roinville =

Roinville may refer to:

- Roinville, Eure-et-Loir, a commune of the Centre region of France
- Roinville, Essonne, a commune of the Île-de-France region
