= Arrondissement of Palaiseau =

Coordinates: 48°42′44″N 2°14′05″E

Palaiseau
- Arrondissement
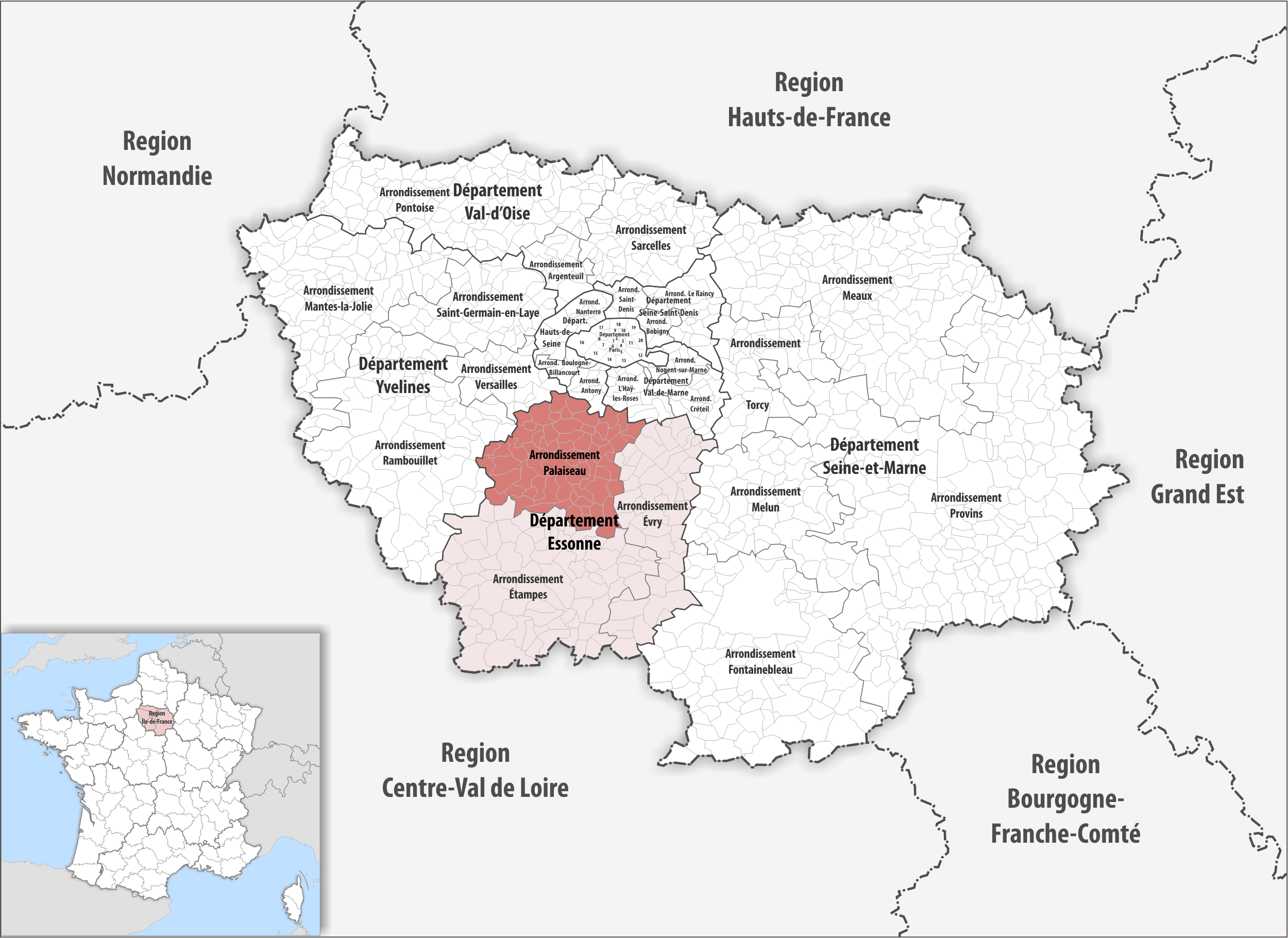
- Location within the region Île-de-France
- Country: France
- Region: Île-de-France
- Department: Essonne
- No. of communes: {{{nbcomm}}}
- Area: 484.0 km^{2} (186.9 sq mi)
- Population (2023): 653,190
  - Density: 1,350/km^{2} (3,495/sq mi)
- INSEE code: 913

The arrondissement of Palaiseau is an arrondissement of France in the Essonne department in the Île-de-France region. It has 68 communes. Its population is 637,912 (2021), and its area is 484.0 km^{2} (186.9 sq mi).

== Composition ==
The communes of the arrondissement of Palaiseau, and their INSEE codes, are:

1. Angervilliers (91017)
2. Arpajon (91021)
3. Athis-Mons (91027)
4. Avrainville (91041)
5. Ballainvilliers (91044)
6. Bièvres (91064)
7. Boullay-les-Troux (91093)
8. Brétigny-sur-Orge (91103)
9. Breuillet (91105)
10. Briis-sous-Forges (91111)
11. Bruyères-le-Châtel (91115)
12. Bures-sur-Yvette (91122)
13. Champlan (91136)
14. Cheptainville (91156)
15. Chilly-Mazarin (91161)
16. Courson-Monteloup (91186)
17. Égly (91207)
18. Épinay-sur-Orge (91216)
19. Fontenay-lès-Briis (91243)
20. Forges-les-Bains (91249)
21. Gif-sur-Yvette (91272)
22. Gometz-la-Ville (91274)
23. Gometz-le-Châtel (91275)
24. Guibeville (91292)
25. Igny (91312)
26. Janvry (91319)
27. Juvisy-sur-Orge (91326)
28. Leudeville (91332)
29. Leuville-sur-Orge (91333)
30. Limours (91338)
31. Linas (91339)
32. Longjumeau (91345)
33. Longpont-sur-Orge (91347)
34. Marcoussis (91363)
35. Marolles-en-Hurepoix (91376)
36. Massy (91377)
37. Les Molières (91411)
38. Montlhéry (91425)
39. Morangis (91432)
40. La Norville (91457)
41. Nozay (91458)
42. Ollainville (91461)
43. Orsay (91471)
44. Palaiseau (91477)
45. Paray-Vieille-Poste (91479)
46. Pecqueuse (91482)
47. Le Plessis-Pâté (91494)
48. Saclay (91534)
49. Saint-Aubin (91538)
50. Sainte-Geneviève-des-Bois (91549)
51. Saint-Germain-lès-Arpajon (91552)
52. Saint-Jean-de-Beauregard (91560)
53. Saint-Maurice-Montcouronne (91568)
54. Saint-Michel-sur-Orge (91570)
55. Saint-Vrain (91579)
56. Saulx-les-Chartreux (91587)
57. Savigny-sur-Orge (91589)
58. Les Ulis (91692)
59. Vaugrigneuse (91634)
60. Vauhallan (91635)
61. Verrières-le-Buisson (91645)
62. Villebon-sur-Yvette (91661)
63. La Ville-du-Bois (91665)
64. Villejust (91666)
65. Villemoisson-sur-Orge (91667)
66. Villiers-le-Bâcle (91679)
67. Villiers-sur-Orge (91685)
68. Wissous (91689)

== History ==
The arrondissement of Palaiseau was created in 1962 as part of the department Seine-et-Oise. In 1968 it became part of the new department Essonne. At the January 2017 reorganisation of the arrondissements of Essonne, it received three communes from the arrondissement of Étampes.

As a result of the reorganisation of the cantons of France which came into effect in 2015, the borders of the cantons are no longer related to the borders of the arrondissements. The cantons of the arrondissement of Palaiseau were, as of January 2015:

1. Arpajon
2. Athis-Mons
3. Bièvres
4. Brétigny-sur-Orge
5. Chilly-Mazarin
6. Gif-sur-Yvette
7. Juvisy-sur-Orge
8. Limours
9. Longjumeau
10. Massy-Est
11. Massy-Ouest
12. Montlhéry
13. Orsay
14. Palaiseau
15. Sainte-Geneviève-des-Bois
16. Saint-Michel-sur-Orge
17. Savigny-sur-Orge
18. Les Ulis
19. Villebon-sur-Yvette

== Sub-prefects ==
- Jean Dussourd : 1990-1992
