= Souzy-la-Briche =

Commune in Île-de-France, France

- Commune
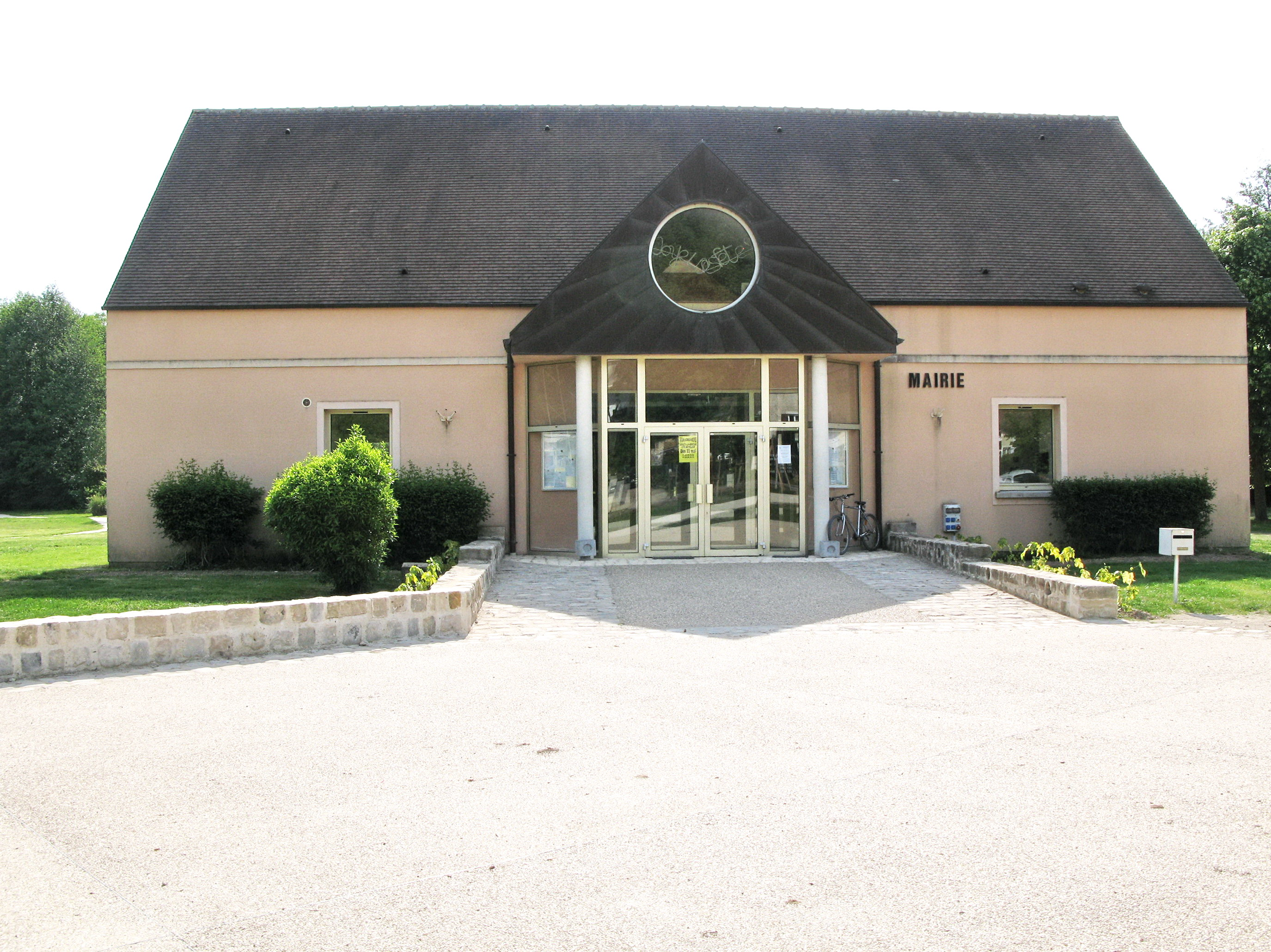
- The town hall in Souzy-la-Briche

- Coat of arms
- Location of Souzy-la-Briche
- Location within France Location within Île-de-France (region)
- Coordinates: 48°31′43″N 2°08′54″E
- Country: France
- Region: Île-de-France
- Department: Essonne
- Arrondissement: Étampes
- Canton: Dourdan
- Intercommunality: Entre Juine et Renarde

Government
  - Mayor (2020–2026): Christian Gourin
- Area^{1}: 7.33 km^{2} (2.83 sq mi)
- Highest elevation: 157 m (515 ft)
- Lowest elevation: 73 m (240 ft)
- Population (2023): 503
  - Density: 68.6/km^{2} (178/sq mi)
- Time zone: UTC+01:00 (CET)
  - Summer (DST): UTC+02:00 (CEST)
- INSEE/Postal code: 91602 /91580
- ^{1} French Land Register data, which excludes lakes, ponds, glaciers > 1 km^{2} (0.386 sq mi or 247 acres) and river estuaries.

Souzy-la-Briche (French pronunciation: [suzi la bʁiʃ]) is a commune in the Essonne department in Île-de-France, northern France.

Inhabitants of Souzy-la-Briche are known as Souzéens.

== See also ==
- Communes of the Essonne department
