= Sermaise, Essonne =

Commune in Île-de-France, France

Sermaise
- Commune
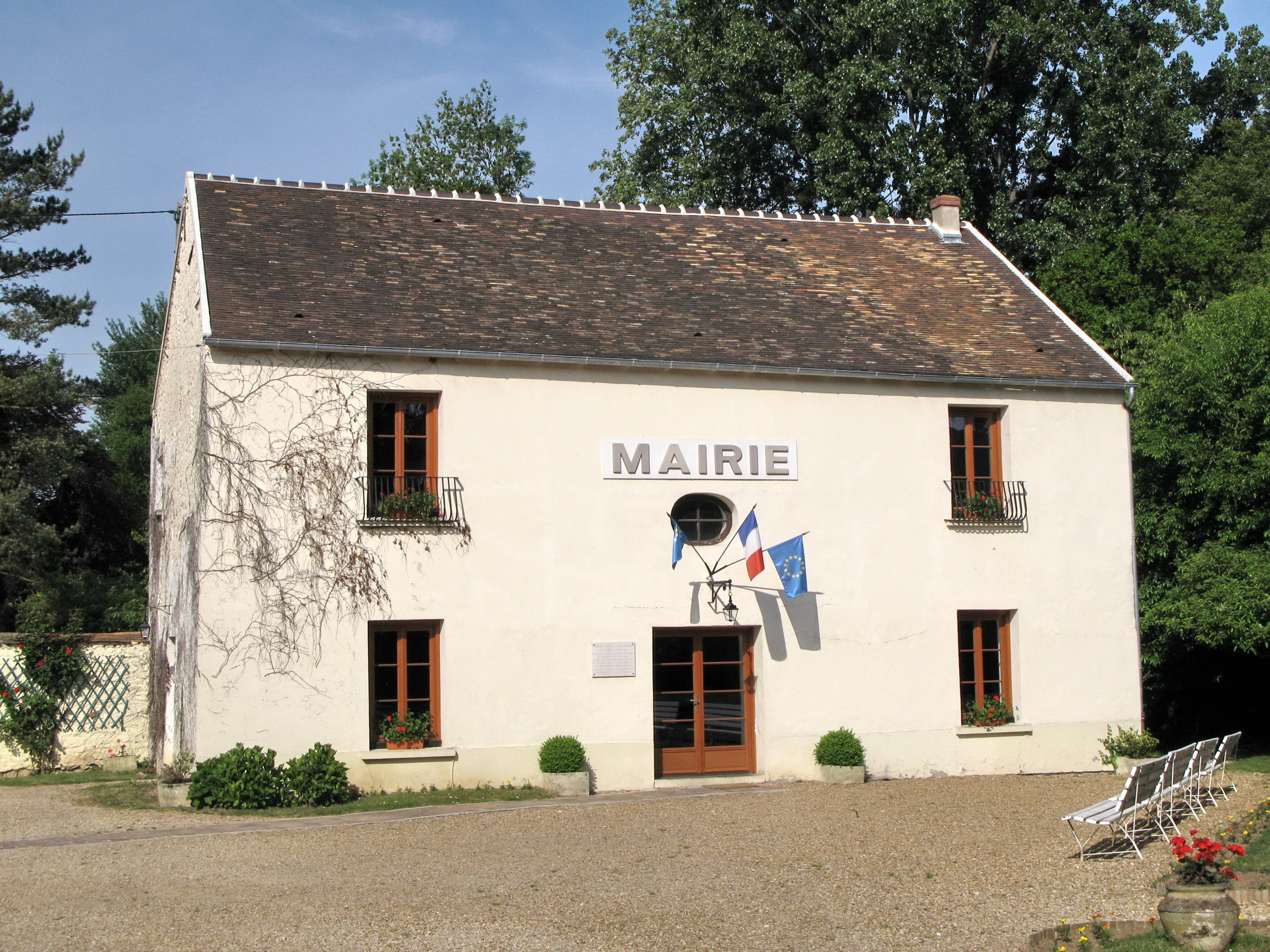
- The town hall in Sermaise
- Location of Sermaise
- Location within France Location within Île-de-France (region)
- Coordinates: 48°32′12″N 2°04′51″E
- Country: France
- Region: Île-de-France
- Department: Essonne
- Arrondissement: Étampes
- Canton: Dourdan
- Intercommunality: Le Dourdannais en Hurepoix

Government
  - Mayor (2020–2026): Magali Hautefeuille
- Area^{1}: 13.60 km^{2} (5.25 sq mi)
- Highest elevation: 159 m (522 ft)
- Lowest elevation: 71 m (233 ft)
- Population (2023): 1,617
  - Density: 118.9/km^{2} (307.9/sq mi)
- Time zone: UTC+01:00 (CET)
  - Summer (DST): UTC+02:00 (CEST)
- INSEE/Postal code: 91593 /91530
- ^{1} French Land Register data, which excludes lakes, ponds, glaciers > 1 km^{2} (0.386 sq mi or 247 acres) and river estuaries.

Sermaise (French pronunciation: [sɛʁmɛz]) is a commune in the Essonne department in Île-de-France in northern France.

Inhabitants of Sermaise are known as Sermaisiens.

== See also ==
- Communes of the Essonne department
