= Canton of Dourdan =

Administrative division of the Essonne department

Coordinates: 48.53°N 2.01°E

The canton of Dourdan is an administrative division of the Essonne department, Île-de-France region, northern France. Its borders were modified at the French canton reorganisation which came into effect in March 2015. Its seat is in Dourdan.

It consists of the following communes:

1. Angervilliers
2. Breuillet
3. Breux-Jouy
4. Briis-sous-Forges
5. Chamarande
6. Chauffour-lès-Étréchy
7. Corbreuse
8. Courson-Monteloup
9. Dourdan
10. Étréchy
11. Fontenay-lès-Briis
12. La Forêt-le-Roi
13. Forges-les-Bains
14. Les Granges-le-Roi
15. Janvry
16. Limours
17. Mauchamps
18. Richarville
19. Roinville
20. Saint-Chéron
21. Saint-Cyr-sous-Dourdan
22. Saint-Maurice-Montcouronne
23. Saint-Sulpice-de-Favières
24. Sermaise
25. Souzy-la-Briche
26. Le Val-Saint-Germain
27. Vaugrigneuse
28. Villeconin
