= Briis-sous-Forges =

Commune in Île-de-France, France

- Commune
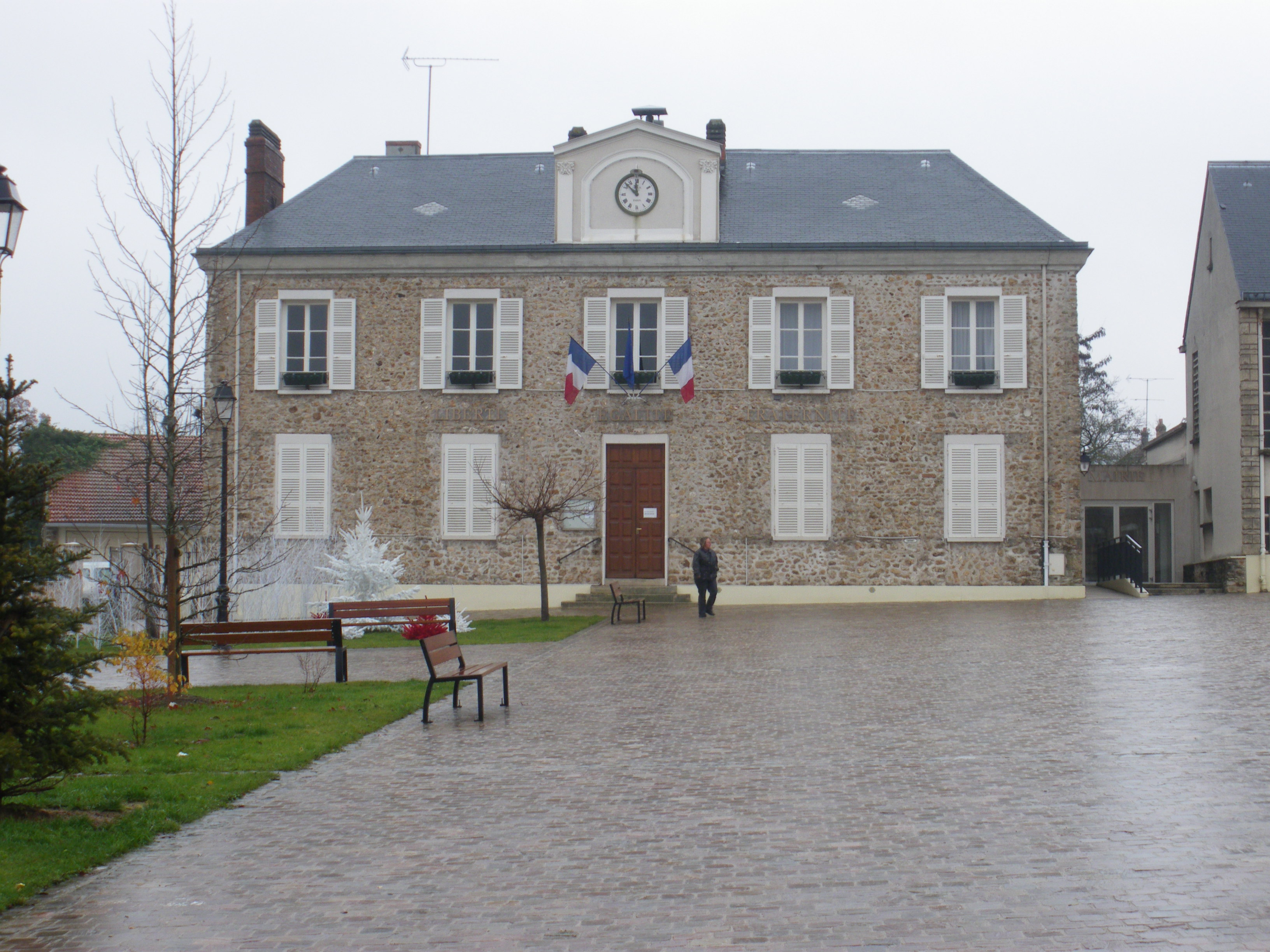
- The town hall of Briis-sous-Forges

- Coat of arms
- Location of Briis-sous-Forges
- Location within France Location within Île-de-France (region)
- Coordinates: 48°37′29″N 2°07′27″E
- Country: France
- Region: Île-de-France
- Department: Essonne
- Arrondissement: Palaiseau
- Canton: Dourdan
- Intercommunality: Pays de Limours

Government
  - Mayor (2020–2026): Emmanuel Dassa
- Area^{1}: 10.86 km^{2} (4.19 sq mi)
- Highest elevation: 173 m (568 ft)
- Lowest elevation: 87 m (285 ft)
- Population (2023): 3,342
  - Density: 307.7/km^{2} (797.0/sq mi)
- Time zone: UTC+01:00 (CET)
  - Summer (DST): UTC+02:00 (CEST)
- INSEE/Postal code: 91111 /91640
- ^{1} French Land Register data, which excludes lakes, ponds, glaciers > 1 km^{2} (0.386 sq mi or 247 acres) and river estuaries.

Briis-sous-Forges (French pronunciation: [bʁi su fɔʁʒ], literally Briis under Forges) is a commune in the Essonne department and Île-de-France region of north-central France.

== Population ==
Historical population
Year	Pop.	±% p.a.
1968	1,059	—
1975	1,547	+5.56%
1982	1,850	+2.59%
1990	2,220	+2.31%
1999	3,211	+4.19%
2007	3,352	+0.54%
2012	3,551	+1.16%
2017	3,408	−0.82%
2023	3,342	−0.33%
Source: INSEE

The inhabitants of Briis-sous-Forges are known in French as les Briissois.

== See also ==
- Communes of the Essonne department
