= Les Granges-le-Roi =

Commune in Île-de-France, France

- Commune
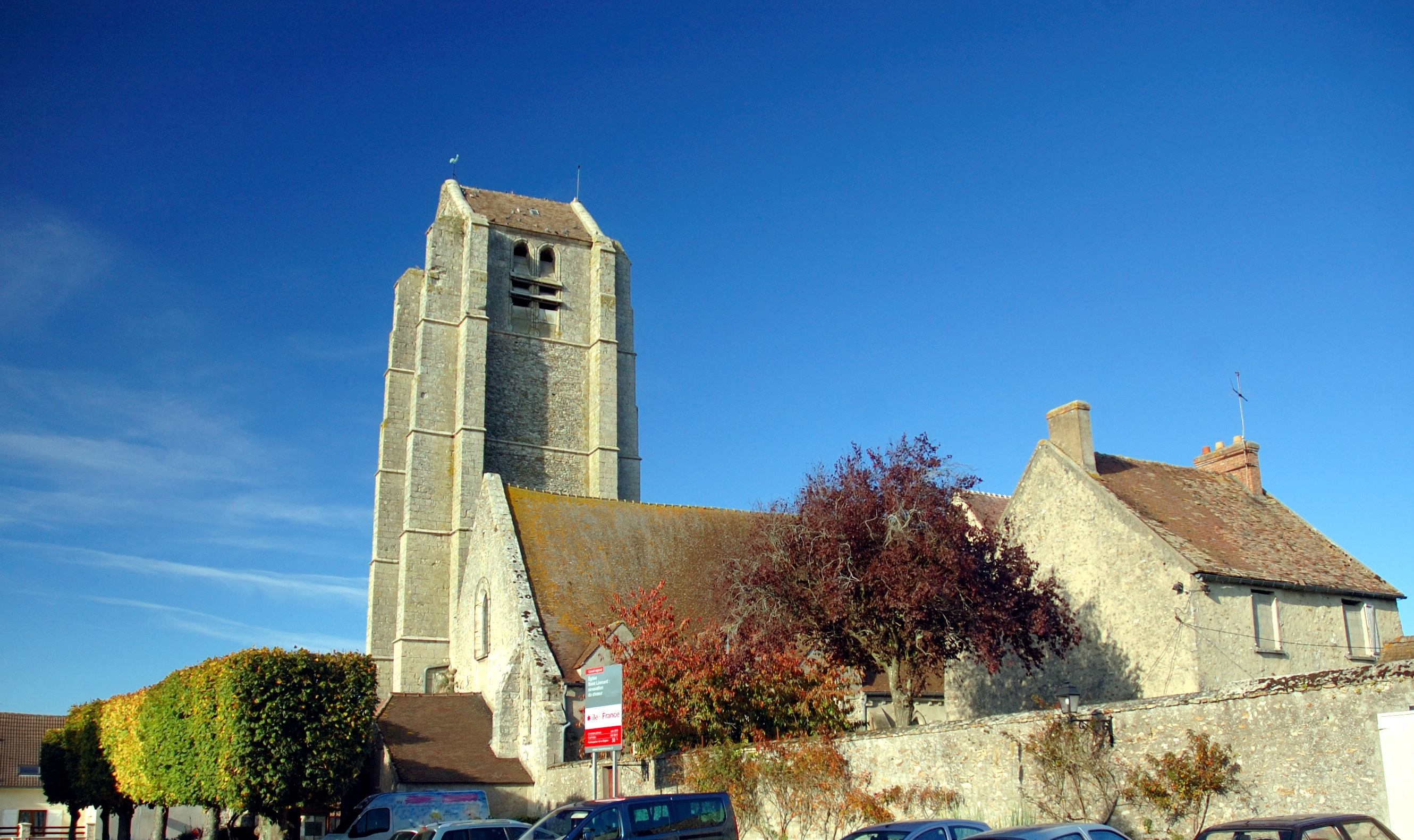
- The church of Saint-Léonard, in Les Granges-le-Roi
- Location of Les Granges-le-Roi
- Location within France Location within Île-de-France (region)
- Coordinates: 48°30′14″N 2°01′18″E
- Country: France
- Region: Île-de-France
- Department: Essonne
- Arrondissement: Étampes
- Canton: Dourdan
- Intercommunality: Le Dourdannais en Hurepoix

Government
  - Mayor (2021–2026): Pierre Vallée
- Area^{1}: 12.68 km^{2} (4.90 sq mi)
- Highest elevation: 158 m (518 ft)
- Lowest elevation: 97 m (318 ft)
- Population (2023): 1,197
  - Density: 94.40/km^{2} (244.5/sq mi)
- Time zone: UTC+01:00 (CET)
  - Summer (DST): UTC+02:00 (CEST)
- INSEE/Postal code: 91284 /91410
- ^{1} French Land Register data, which excludes lakes, ponds, glaciers > 1 km^{2} (0.386 sq mi or 247 acres) and river estuaries.

Les Granges-le-Roi (French pronunciation: [le ɡʁɑ̃ʒ lə ʁwa]) is a commune in the Essonne department in Île-de-France in northern France.

Inhabitants of Les Granges-le-Roi are known as Grangeois.

== See also ==
- Communes of the Essonne department
