= Saint-Cyr-sous-Dourdan =

Commune in Île-de-France, France

- Commune
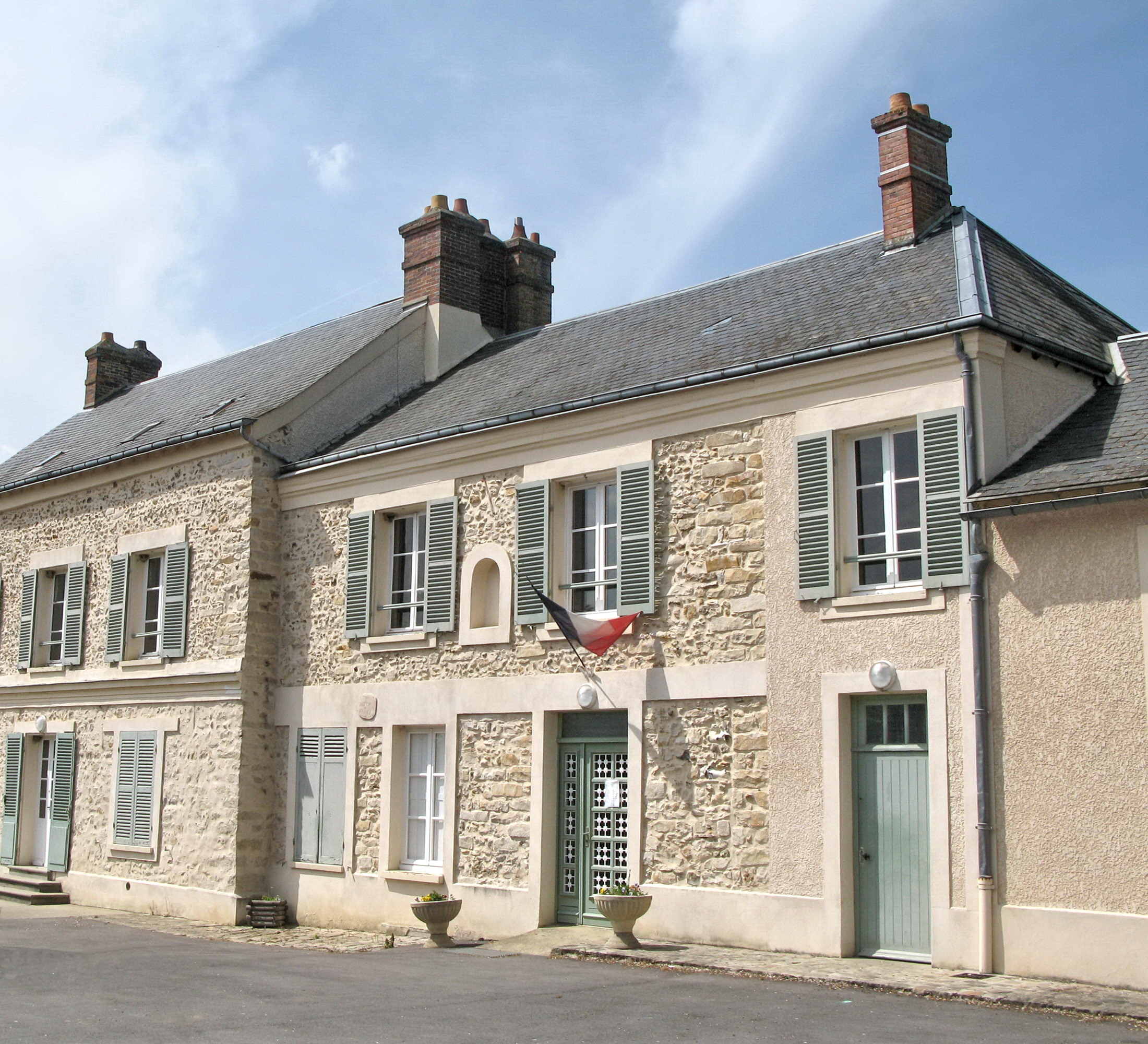
- The town hall in Saint-Cyr-sous-Dourdan
- Location of Saint-Cyr-sous-Dourdan
- Location within France Location within Île-de-France (region)
- Coordinates: 48°34′08″N 2°02′05″E
- Country: France
- Region: Île-de-France
- Department: Essonne
- Arrondissement: Étampes
- Canton: Dourdan

Government
  - Mayor (2020–2026): Jean-Pierre Moulin
- Area^{1}: 9.89 km^{2} (3.82 sq mi)
- Highest elevation: 160 m (520 ft)
- Lowest elevation: 72 m (236 ft)
- Population (2023): 982
  - Density: 99.3/km^{2} (257/sq mi)
- Time zone: UTC+01:00 (CET)
  - Summer (DST): UTC+02:00 (CEST)
- INSEE/Postal code: 91546 /91410
- ^{1} French Land Register data, which excludes lakes, ponds, glaciers > 1 km^{2} (0.386 sq mi or 247 acres) and river estuaries.

Saint-Cyr-sous-Dourdan (French pronunciation: [sɛ̃ siʁ su duʁdɑ̃], literally Saint-Cyr under Dourdan) is a commune in the Essonne department in Île-de-France in northern France.

Inhabitants of Saint-Cyr-sous-Dourdan are known as Saint-Cyriens.

== See also ==
- Communes of the Essonne department
