= Richarville =

Commune in Île-de-France, France

- Commune
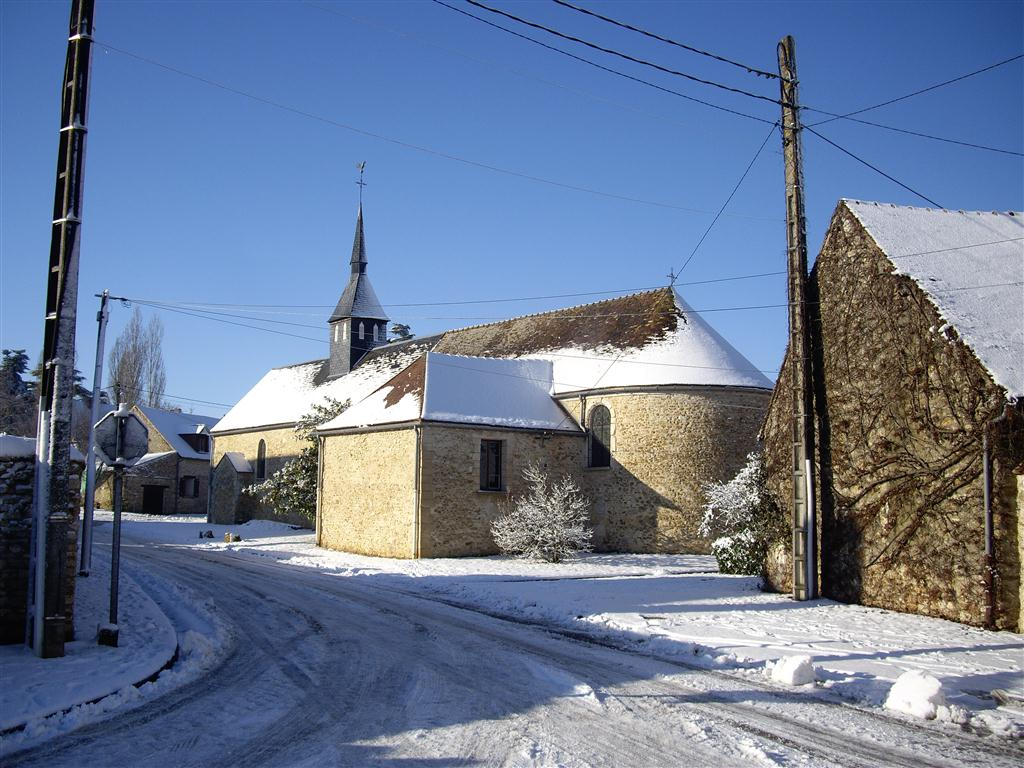
- The church in Richarville, in winter

- Coat of arms
- Location of Richarville
- Location within France Location within Île-de-France (region)
- Coordinates: 48°28′14″N 2°00′05″E
- Country: France
- Region: Île-de-France
- Department: Essonne
- Arrondissement: Étampes
- Canton: Dourdan
- Intercommunality: Le Dourdannais en Hurepoix

Government
  - Mayor (2020–2026): Carine Houdouin
- Area^{1}: 10.35 km^{2} (4.00 sq mi)
- Highest elevation: 154 m (505 ft)
- Lowest elevation: 117 m (384 ft)
- Population (2023): 386
  - Density: 37.3/km^{2} (96.6/sq mi)
- Time zone: UTC+01:00 (CET)
  - Summer (DST): UTC+02:00 (CEST)
- INSEE/Postal code: 91519 /91410
- ^{1} French Land Register data, which excludes lakes, ponds, glaciers > 1 km^{2} (0.386 sq mi or 247 acres) and river estuaries.

Richarville (French pronunciation: [ʁiʃaʁvil]) is a commune in the Essonne department in Île-de-France in northern France.

Inhabitants of Richarville are known as Richarvillois.

== See also ==
- Communes of the Essonne department
