= Vauhallan =

Commune in Île-de-France, France

- Commune
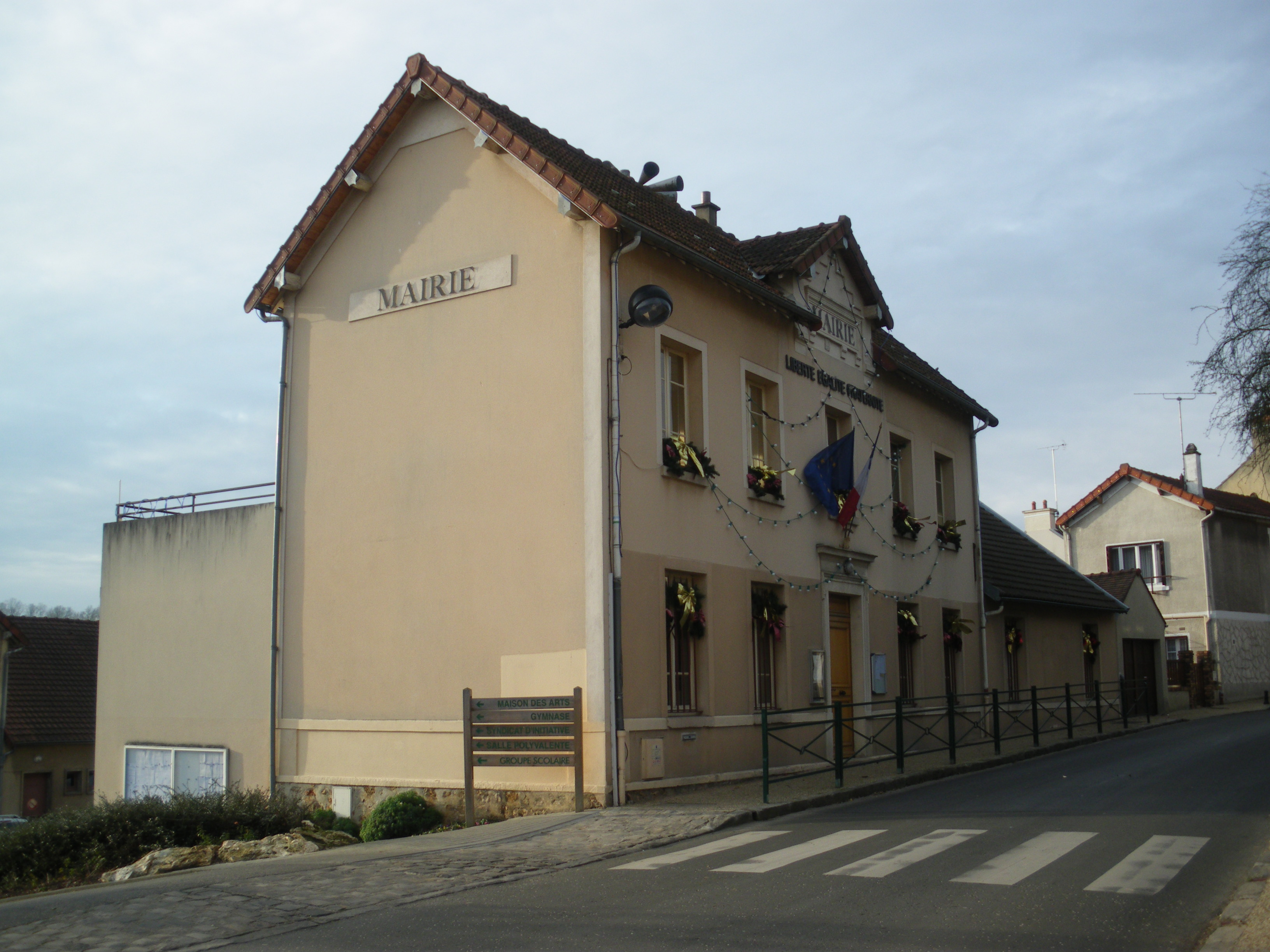
- The town hall

- Coat of arms
- Location of Vauhallan
- Location within France Location within Île-de-France (region)
- Coordinates: 48°44′03″N 2°12′20″E
- Country: France
- Region: Île-de-France
- Department: Essonne
- Arrondissement: Palaiseau
- Canton: Gif-sur-Yvette
- Intercommunality: CA Paris-Saclay

Government
  - Mayor (2020–2026): Bernard Gleize
- Area^{1}: 3.34 km^{2} (1.29 sq mi)
- Highest elevation: 154 m (505 ft)
- Lowest elevation: 80 m (260 ft)
- Population (2023): 1,945
  - Density: 582/km^{2} (1,510/sq mi)
- Time zone: UTC+01:00 (CET)
  - Summer (DST): UTC+02:00 (CEST)
- INSEE/Postal code: 91635 /91430
- ^{1} French Land Register data, which excludes lakes, ponds, glaciers > 1 km^{2} (0.386 sq mi or 247 acres) and river estuaries.

Vauhallan (French pronunciation: [voalɑ̃]) is a commune in the Essonne department in Île-de-France in northern France.

== Population ==
Historical population
Year	Pop.	±% p.a.
1968	1,757	—
1975	1,856	+0.79%
1982	1,775	−0.64%
1990	1,795	+0.14%
1999	2,058	+1.53%
2007	2,004	−0.33%
2012	1,956	−0.48%
2017	2,059	+1.03%
2023	1,945	−0.94%
Source: INSEE

Inhabitants of Vauhallan are known as Vauhallanais in French.

== Education ==
Public schools in the commune include:

- École maternelle "Les Sablons" (preschool)
- École élémentaire "Les Sablons" (elementary school)

Residents are assigned to Collège Emile Zola (a public junior high school) in Igny.

Area senior high schools/sixth-form colleges include:

- Lycée Fustel de Coulanges in Massy
- Lycée Parc de Vilgénis in Massy
- Lycée professionnel Gustave Eiffel in Massy
- Lycée International de Palaiseau in Palaiseau

== See also ==
- Communes of the Essonne department
