= Pecqueuse =

Commune in Île-de-France, France

- Commune
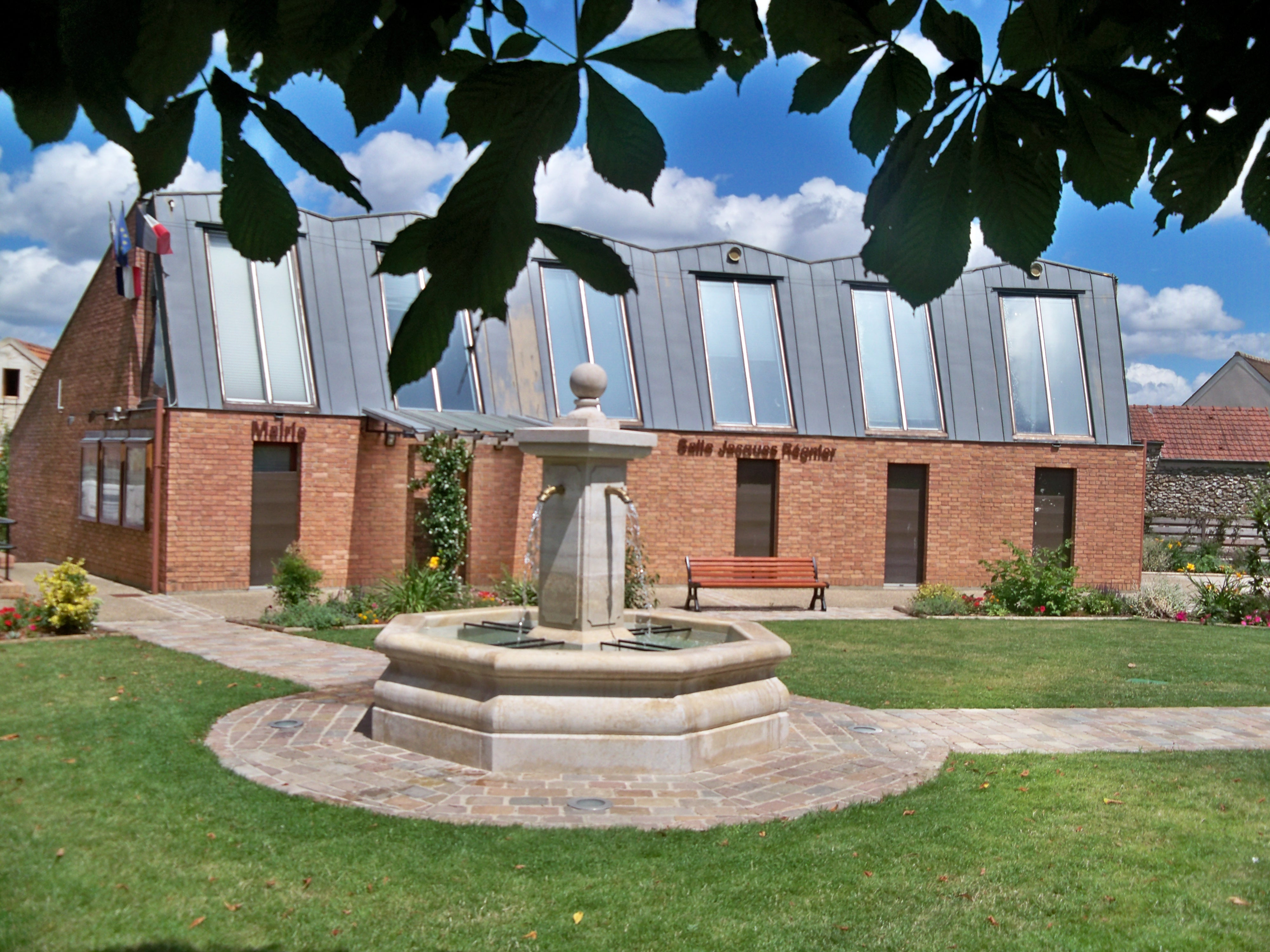
- The town hall in Pecqueuse
- Location of Pecqueuse
- Location within France Location within Île-de-France (region)
- Coordinates: 48°38′48″N 2°02′55″E
- Country: France
- Region: Île-de-France
- Department: Essonne
- Arrondissement: Palaiseau
- Canton: Gif-sur-Yvette
- Intercommunality: Pays de Limours

Government
  - Mayor (2020–2026): Jean-Marc Delaitre
- Area^{1}: 7.40 km^{2} (2.86 sq mi)
- Elevation: 150 m (490 ft)
- Highest elevation: 178 m (584 ft)
- Lowest elevation: 133 m (436 ft)
- Population (2023): 580
  - Density: 78/km^{2} (200/sq mi)
- Time zone: UTC+01:00 (CET)
  - Summer (DST): UTC+02:00 (CEST)
- INSEE/Postal code: 91482 /91470
- ^{1} French Land Register data, which excludes lakes, ponds, glaciers > 1 km^{2} (0.386 sq mi or 247 acres) and river estuaries.

Pecqueuse (French pronunciation: [pɛkøz]) is a commune in the Essonne department in the southern suburbs of Paris, France. It lies adjacent to the west of the larger town Limours. Inhabitants of Pecqueuse are known as Pescusiens in French.

== Places to see ==
- A church built in the 18th century.

== See also ==
- Communes of the Essonne department
