= Breuillet, Essonne =

Commune in Île-de-France, France

Breuillet
- Commune
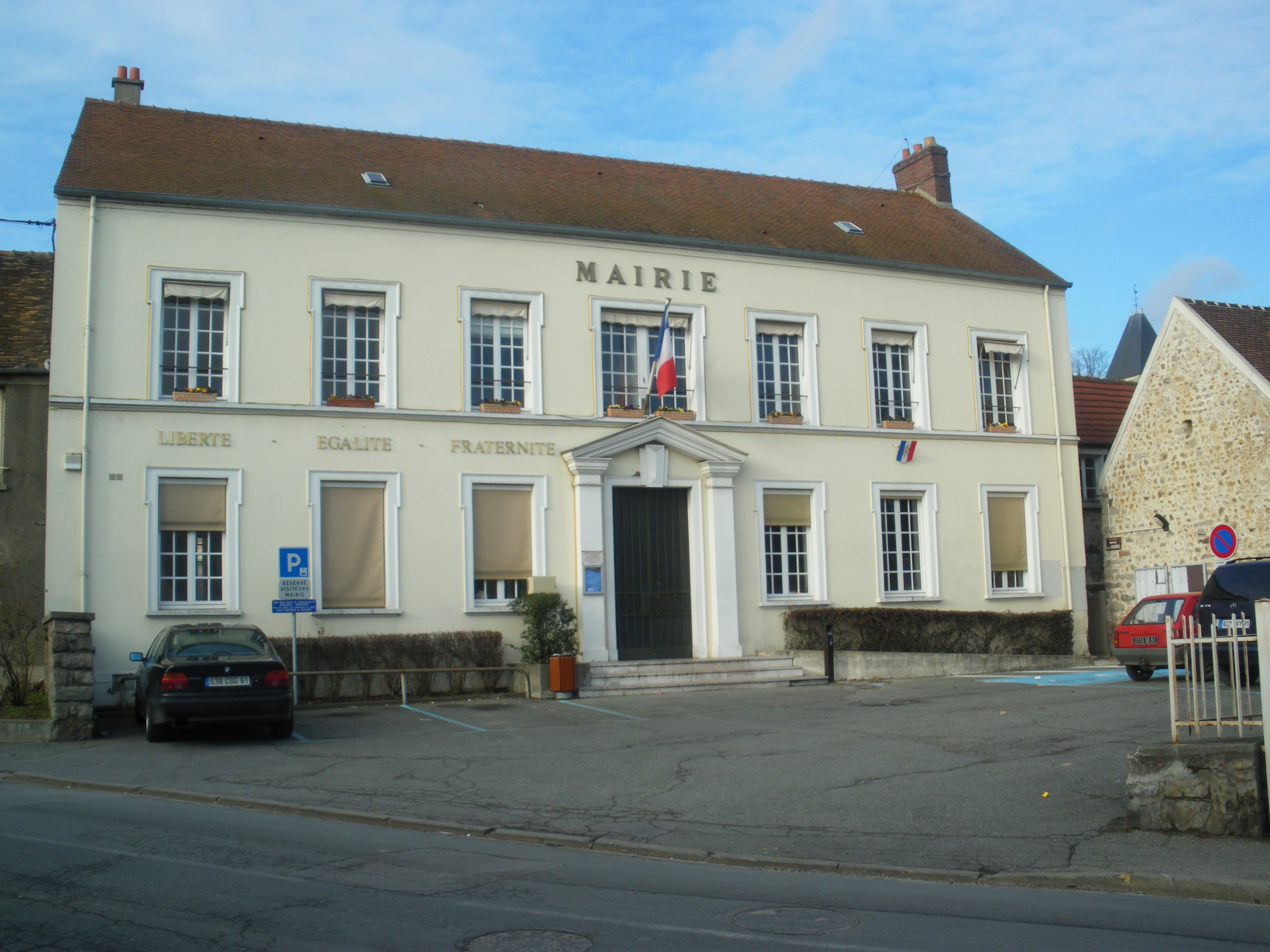
- The town hall of Breuillet

- Coat of arms
- Location of Breuillet
- Location within France Location within Île-de-France (region)
- Coordinates: 48°33′57″N 2°10′14″E
- Country: France
- Region: Île-de-France
- Department: Essonne
- Arrondissement: Palaiseau
- Canton: Dourdan
- Intercommunality: CA Cœur d'Essonne

Government
  - Mayor (2020–2026): Véronique Mayeur
- Area^{1}: 6.69 km^{2} (2.58 sq mi)
- Highest elevation: 116 m (381 ft)
- Lowest elevation: 50 m (160 ft)
- Population (2023): 9,157
  - Density: 1,370/km^{2} (3,550/sq mi)
- Time zone: UTC+01:00 (CET)
  - Summer (DST): UTC+02:00 (CEST)
- INSEE/Postal code: 91105 /91650
- ^{1} French Land Register data, which excludes lakes, ponds, glaciers > 1 km^{2} (0.386 sq mi or 247 acres) and river estuaries.

Breuillet (French: [bʁøjɛ]) is a commune in the Essonne department in Île-de-France in northern France.

It is located between Arpajon and Dourdan.

== Population ==
Inhabitants of Breuillet are known as Breuilletois in French.

Historical population
Year	Pop.	±% p.a.
1968	2,639	—
1975	6,562	+13.90%
1982	7,176	+1.29%
1990	7,321	+0.25%
1999	7,331	+0.02%
2007	8,150	+1.33%
2012	8,408	+0.63%
2017	8,394	−0.03%
2023	9,157	+1.46%
Source: INSEE

== Twin towns ==
Breuillet has town twinning and cooperation agreement with:

- Ammanford, Wales.

== See also ==
- Communes of the Essonne department
