= Corbreuse =

Commune in Île-de-France, France

- Commune
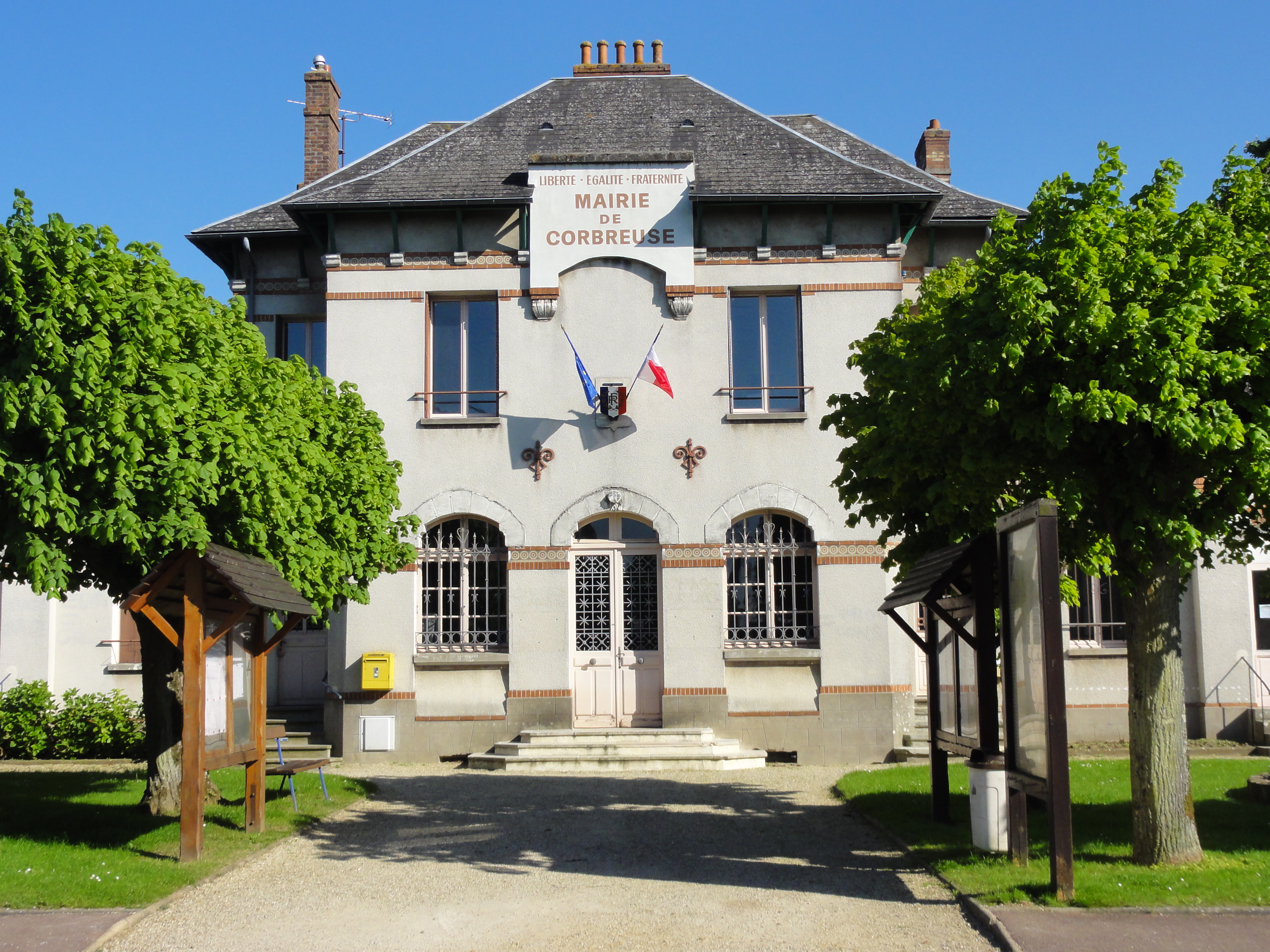
- The town hall of Corbreuse

- Coat of arms
- Location of Corbreuse
- Location within France Location within Île-de-France (region)
- Coordinates: 48°30′03″N 1°57′28″E
- Country: France
- Region: Île-de-France
- Department: Essonne
- Arrondissement: Étampes
- Canton: Dourdan
- Intercommunality: Le Dourdannais en Hurepoix

Government
  - Mayor (2020–2026): José Correia
- Area^{1}: 15.79 km^{2} (6.10 sq mi)
- Highest elevation: 160 m (520 ft)
- Lowest elevation: 104 m (341 ft)
- Population (2023): 1,640
  - Density: 104/km^{2} (269/sq mi)
- Time zone: UTC+01:00 (CET)
  - Summer (DST): UTC+02:00 (CEST)
- INSEE/Postal code: 91175 /91410
- ^{1} French Land Register data, which excludes lakes, ponds, glaciers > 1 km^{2} (0.386 sq mi or 247 acres) and river estuaries.

Corbreuse (French pronunciation: [kɔʁbʁøz]) is a commune in the Essonne department in Île-de-France in northern France.

Inhabitants of Corbreuse are known as Corbreusois.

== See also ==
- Communes of the Essonne department
