= Égly =

Commune in Île-de-France, France

- Commune
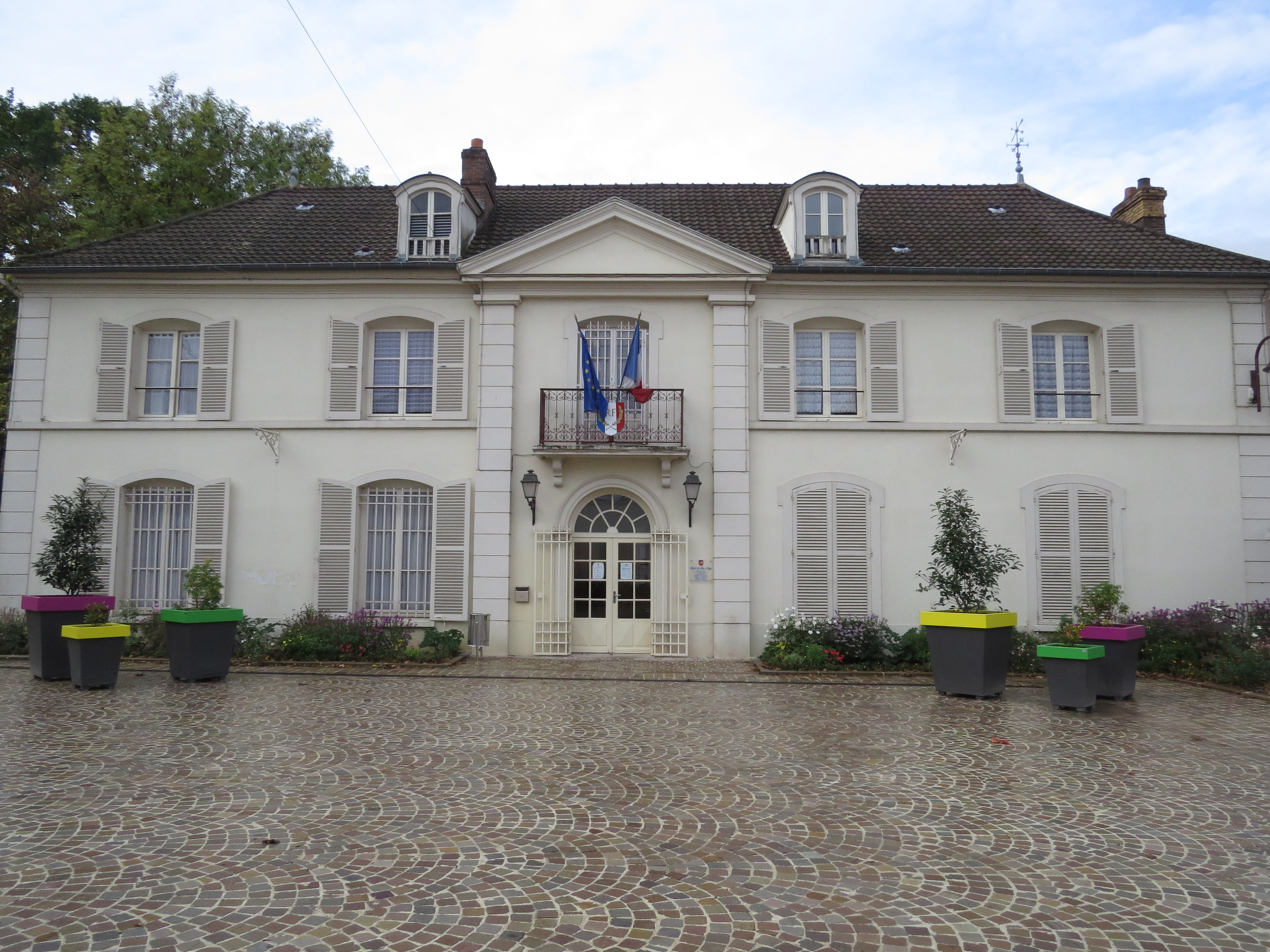
- The town hall of Égly

- Coat of arms
- Location of Égly
- Location within France Location within Île-de-France (region)
- Coordinates: 48°34′47″N 2°13′18″Ef
- Country: France
- Region: Île-de-France
- Department: Essonne
- Arrondissement: Palaiseau
- Canton: Arpajon
- Intercommunality: CA Cœur d'Essonne

Government
  - Mayor (2020–2026): Edouard Matt
- Area^{1}: 3.95 km^{2} (1.53 sq mi)
- Highest elevation: 94 m (308 ft)
- Lowest elevation: 47 m (154 ft)
- Population (2023): 7,166
  - Density: 1,810/km^{2} (4,700/sq mi)
- Time zone: UTC+01:00 (CET)
  - Summer (DST): UTC+02:00 (CEST)
- INSEE/Postal code: 91207 /91520
- ^{1} French Land Register data, which excludes lakes, ponds, glaciers > 1 km^{2} (0.386 sq mi or 247 acres) and river estuaries.

Égly (French pronunciation: [eɡli]) is a commune in the Essonne department in Île-de-France in northern France around 30 km (20 miles) south of Paris.

== Population ==
Inhabitants of Égly are known as Aglatiens in French.

Historical population
Year	Pop.	±% p.a.
1968	1,301	—
1975	4,420	+19.09%
1982	4,759	+1.06%
1990	4,774	+0.04%
1999	5,321	+1.21%
2007	5,240	−0.19%
2012	5,413	+0.65%
2017	5,865	+1.62%
2023	7,166	+3.40%
Source: INSEE

== See also ==
- Communes of the Essonne department
