= Mauchamps =

Commune in Île-de-France, France

- Commune
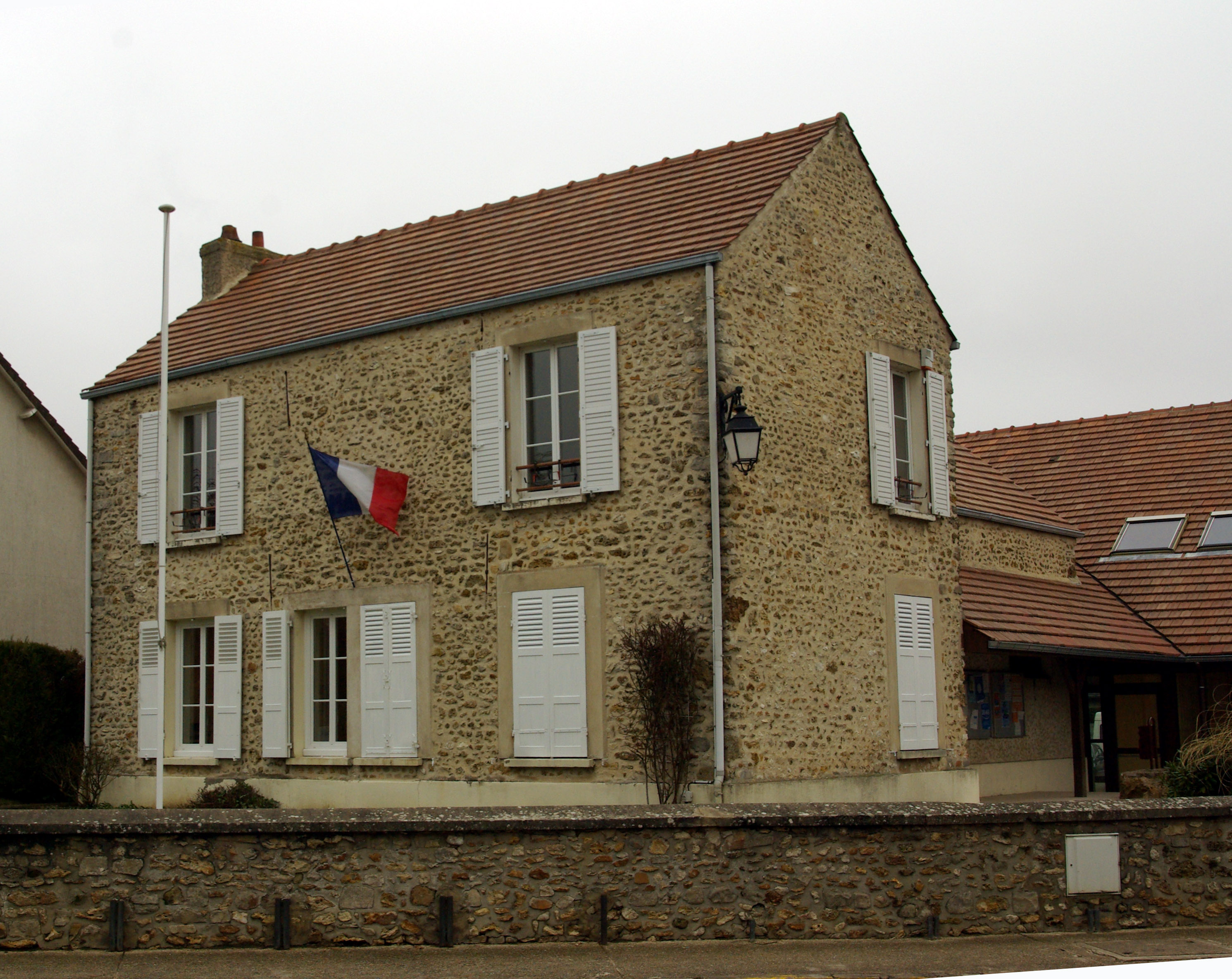
- The town hall in Mauchamps

- Coat of arms

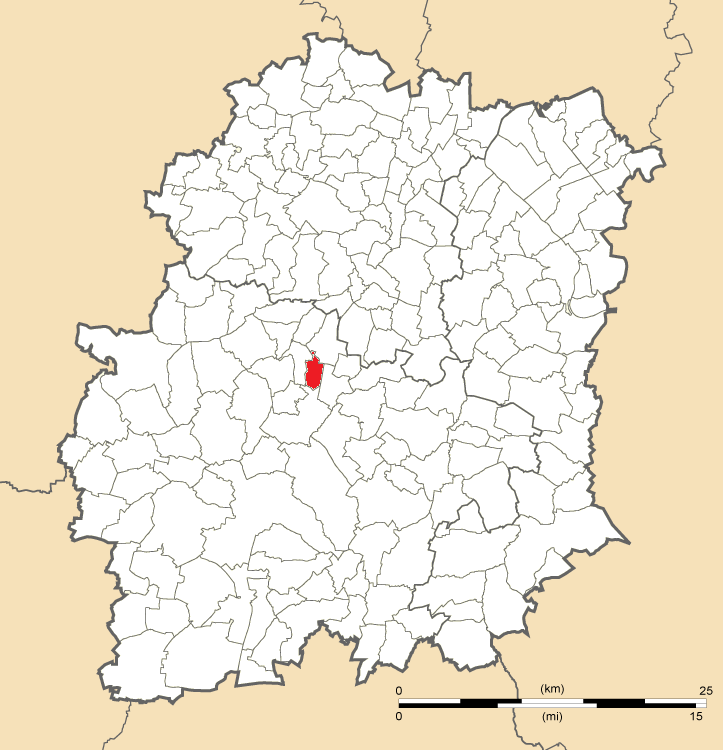
- Location of Mauchamps
- Location within France Location within Île-de-France (region)
- Coordinates: 48°31′44″N 2°11′40″E
- Country: France
- Region: Île-de-France
- Department: Essonne
- Arrondissement: Étampes
- Canton: Dourdan
- Intercommunality: Entre Juine et Renarde

Government
  - Mayor (2020–2026): Thomas Gonsard
- Area^{1}: 3.16 km^{2} (1.22 sq mi)
- Highest elevation: 156 m (512 ft)
- Lowest elevation: 122 m (400 ft)
- Population (2023): 387
  - Density: 122/km^{2} (317/sq mi)
- Time zone: UTC+01:00 (CET)
  - Summer (DST): UTC+02:00 (CEST)
- INSEE/Postal code: 91378 /91730
- ^{1} French Land Register data, which excludes lakes, ponds, glaciers > 1 km^{2} (0.386 sq mi or 247 acres) and river estuaries.

Mauchamps (French pronunciation: [moʃɑ̃]) is a commune in the Essonne department in Île-de-France in northern France.

Inhabitants of Mauchamps are known as Campusiens.

== See also ==
- Communes of the Essonne department
