= La Forêt-le-Roi =

Commune in Île-de-France, France

- Commune
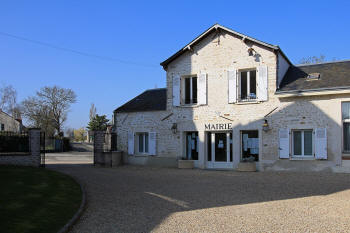
- The town hall of La Forêt-le-Roi

- Coat of arms
- Location of La Forêt-le-Roi
- Location within France Location within Île-de-France (region)
- Coordinates: 48°28′47″N 2°02′36″E
- Country: France
- Region: Île-de-France
- Department: Essonne
- Arrondissement: Étampes
- Canton: Dourdan
- Intercommunality: Le Dourdannais en Hurepoix

Government
  - Mayor (2023–2026): Marie-Ange Gangnebien
- Area^{1}: 7.94 km^{2} (3.07 sq mi)
- Highest elevation: 156 m (512 ft)
- Lowest elevation: 108 m (354 ft)
- Population (2023): 492
  - Density: 62.0/km^{2} (160/sq mi)
- Time zone: UTC+01:00 (CET)
  - Summer (DST): UTC+02:00 (CEST)
- INSEE/Postal code: 91247 /91410
- ^{1} French Land Register data, which excludes lakes, ponds, glaciers > 1 km^{2} (0.386 sq mi or 247 acres) and river estuaries.

La Forêt-le-Roi (French pronunciation: [la fɔʁɛ lə ʁwa]) is a commune in the Essonne department in Île-de-France in northern France.

Inhabitants of La Forêt-le-Roi are known as Forestains.

== See also ==
- Communes of the Essonne department
