= Canton of Gif-sur-Yvette =

Coordinates: 48.70°N 2.13°E

The canton of Gif-sur-Yvette is an administrative division of the Essonne department, Île-de-France region, northern France. Its borders were modified at the French canton reorganisation which came into effect in March 2015. Its seat is in Gif-sur-Yvette.

It consists of the following communes:

1. Bièvres
2. Boullay-les-Troux
3. Bures-sur-Yvette
4. Gif-sur-Yvette
5. Gometz-la-Ville
6. Les Molières
7. Pecqueuse
8. Saclay
9. Saint-Aubin
10. Vauhallan
11. Verrières-le-Buisson
12. Villiers-le-Bâcle
