= Courson-Monteloup =

Commune in Île-de-France, France

- Commune
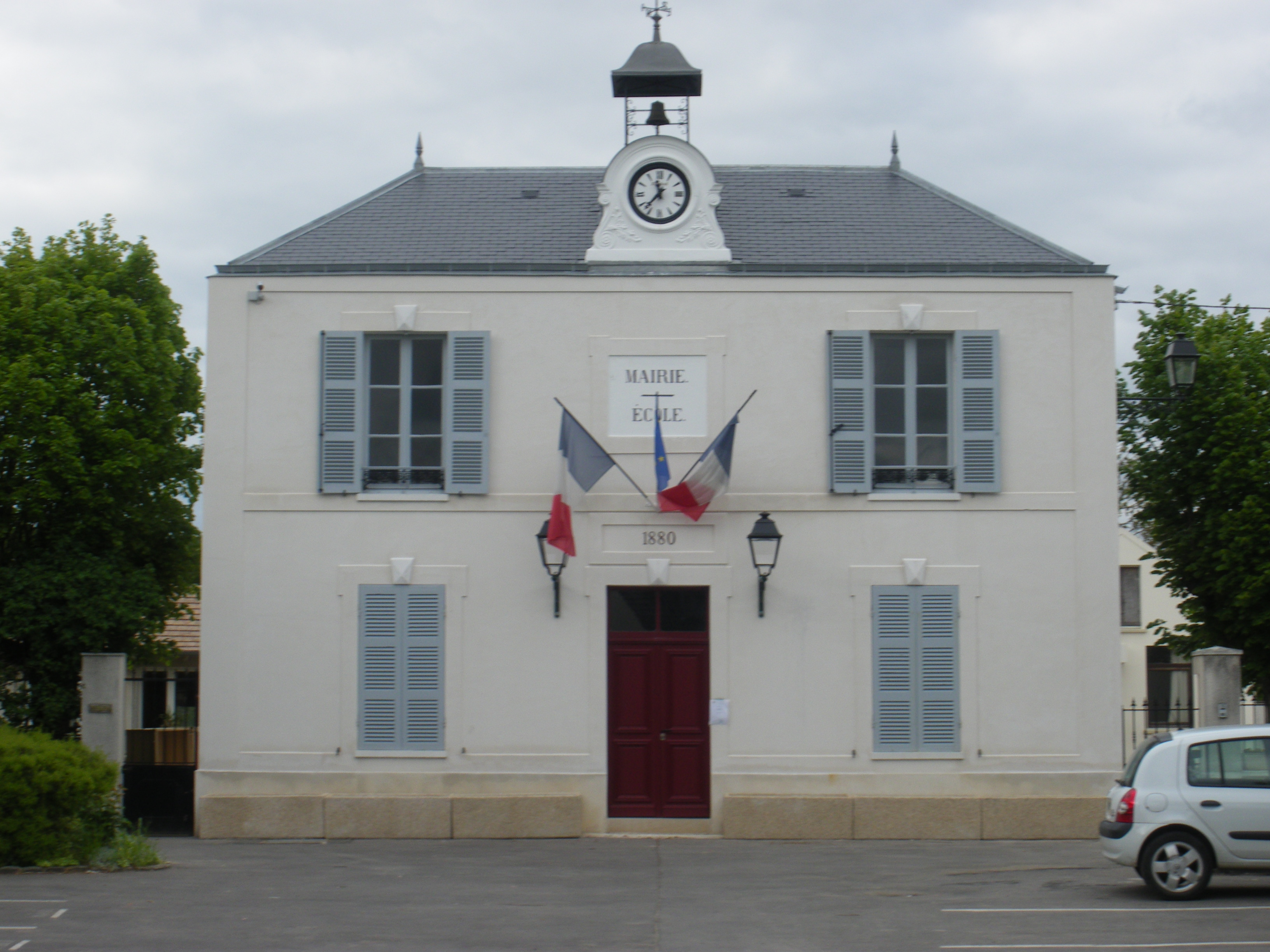
- The town hall of Courson-Monteloup

- Coat of arms
- Location of Courson-Monteloup
- Location within France Location within Île-de-France (region)
- Coordinates: 48°35′35″N 2°08′42″E
- Country: France
- Region: Île-de-France
- Department: Essonne
- Arrondissement: Palaiseau
- Canton: Dourdan
- Intercommunality: Pays de Limours

Government
  - Mayor (2020–2026): Alain Artoré
- Area^{1}: 3.74 km^{2} (1.44 sq mi)
- Highest elevation: 104 m (341 ft)
- Lowest elevation: 72 m (236 ft)
- Population (2023): 563
  - Density: 151/km^{2} (390/sq mi)
- Time zone: UTC+01:00 (CET)
  - Summer (DST): UTC+02:00 (CEST)
- INSEE/Postal code: 91186 /91680
- ^{1} French Land Register data, which excludes lakes, ponds, glaciers > 1 km^{2} (0.386 sq mi or 247 acres) and river estuaries.

Courson-Monteloup (French pronunciation: [kuʁsɔ̃ mɔ̃tlu]) is a commune in the Essonne department in Île-de-France in northern France.

== Residents ==
Inhabitants of Courson-Monteloup are known as Montelupins.

== See also ==
- Communes of the Essonne department
