= Boullay-les-Troux =

Commune in Île-de-France, France

- Commune
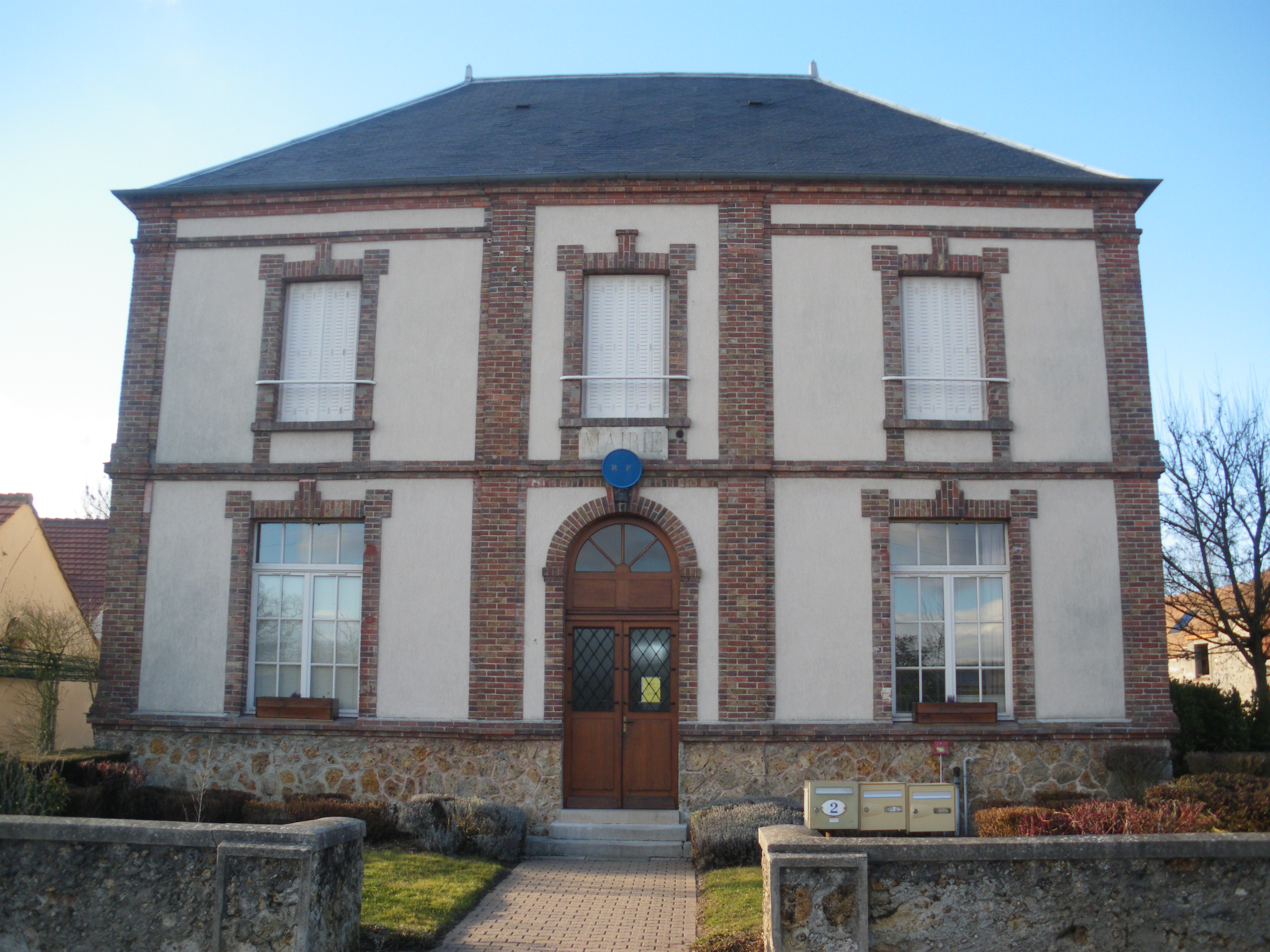
- The town hall of Boullay-les-Troux
- Location of Boullay-les-Troux
- Location within France Location within Île-de-France (region)
- Coordinates: 48°40′42″N 2°02′59″E
- Country: France
- Region: Île-de-France
- Department: Essonne
- Arrondissement: Palaiseau
- Canton: Gif-sur-Yvette
- Intercommunality: Pays de Limours

Government
  - Mayor (2020–2026): Hugues-Alexandre Rousseau
- Area^{1}: 4.80 km^{2} (1.85 sq mi)
- Highest elevation: 177 m (581 ft)
- Lowest elevation: 99 m (325 ft)
- Population (2023): 624
  - Density: 130/km^{2} (337/sq mi)
- Time zone: UTC+01:00 (CET)
  - Summer (DST): UTC+02:00 (CEST)
- INSEE/Postal code: 91093 /91470
- ^{1} French Land Register data, which excludes lakes, ponds, glaciers > 1 km^{2} (0.386 sq mi or 247 acres) and river estuaries.

Boullay-lès-Troux (French pronunciation: [bulɛ le tʁu]) is a commune located thirty kilometers south-west of Paris in the department of Essonne in the Île-de-France region.

Inhabitants of Boullay-les-Troux are known as Boullaisiens.

== See also ==
- Communes of the Essonne department
