= Étréchy, Essonne =

Commune in Île-de-France, France

Étréchy
- Commune
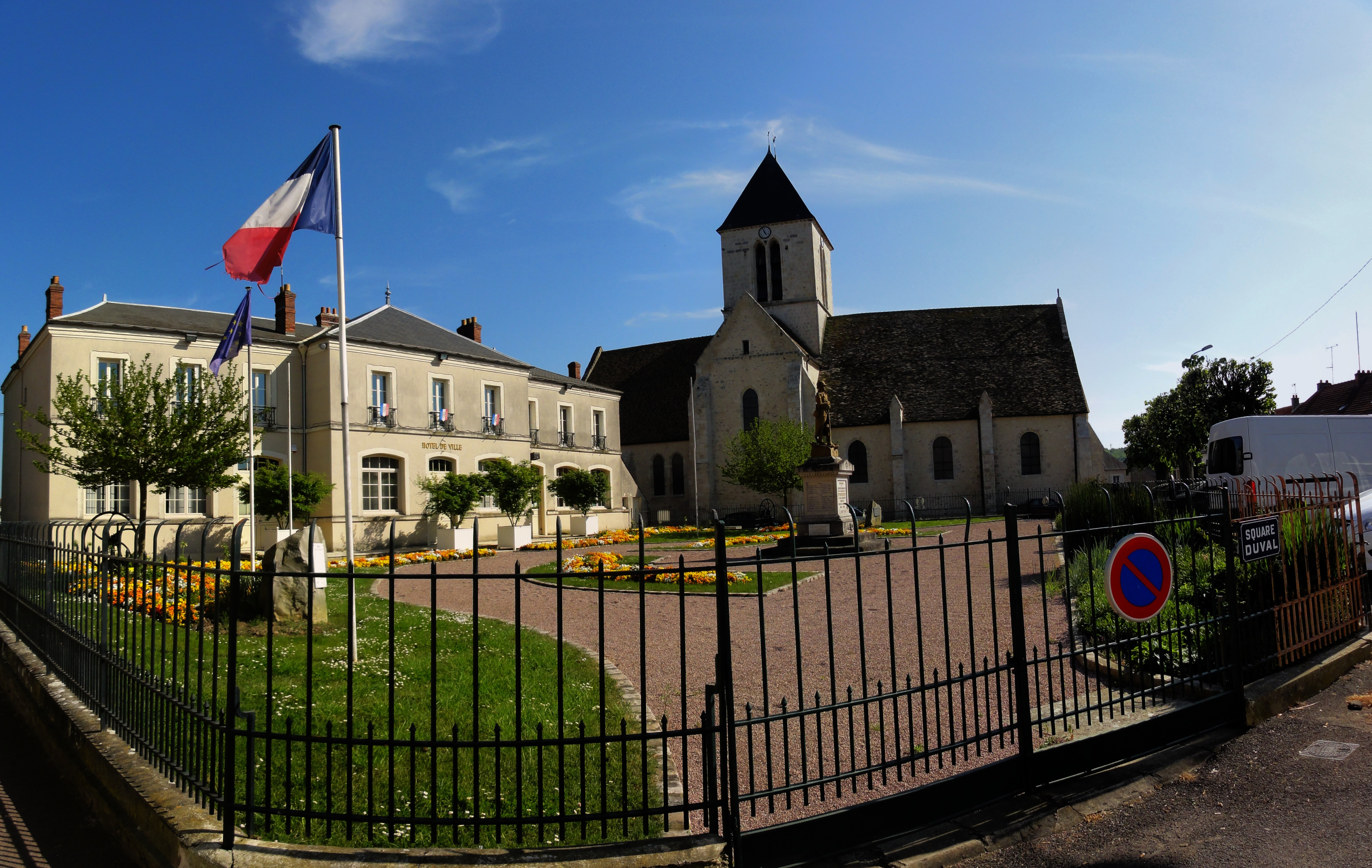
- The town hall and church in Étréchy

- Coat of arms
- Location of Étréchy
- Location within France Location within Île-de-France (region)
- Coordinates: 48°29′38″N 2°11′23″E
- Country: France
- Region: Île-de-France
- Department: Essonne
- Arrondissement: Étampes
- Canton: Dourdan
- Intercommunality: Entre Juine et Renarde

Government
  - Mayor (2020–2026): Julien Garcia
- Area^{1}: 14.06 km^{2} (5.43 sq mi)
- Highest elevation: 156 m (512 ft)
- Lowest elevation: 63 m (207 ft)
- Population (2023): 6,986
  - Density: 496.9/km^{2} (1,287/sq mi)
- Time zone: UTC+01:00 (CET)
  - Summer (DST): UTC+02:00 (CEST)
- INSEE/Postal code: 91226 /91580
- ^{1} French Land Register data, which excludes lakes, ponds, glaciers > 1 km^{2} (0.386 sq mi or 247 acres) and river estuaries.

Étréchy (French pronunciation: [etʁeʃi]) is a commune in the Essonne department in Île-de-France in northern France.

== Geography ==
The village lies on the left bank of the river Juine, which forms all of the commune's eastern border.

== Population ==
Inhabitants of Étréchy are known as Strépiniacois in French.

Historical population
Year	Pop.	±% p.a.
1968	2,876	—
1975	5,244	+8.96%
1982	5,600	+0.94%
1990	5,950	+0.76%
1999	6,104	+0.28%
2007	6,219	+0.23%
2012	6,341	+0.39%
2017	6,541	+0.62%
2023	6,986	+1.10%
Source: INSEE

== See also ==
- Communes of the Essonne department
