= Angervilliers =

Commune in Île-de-France, France

- Commune
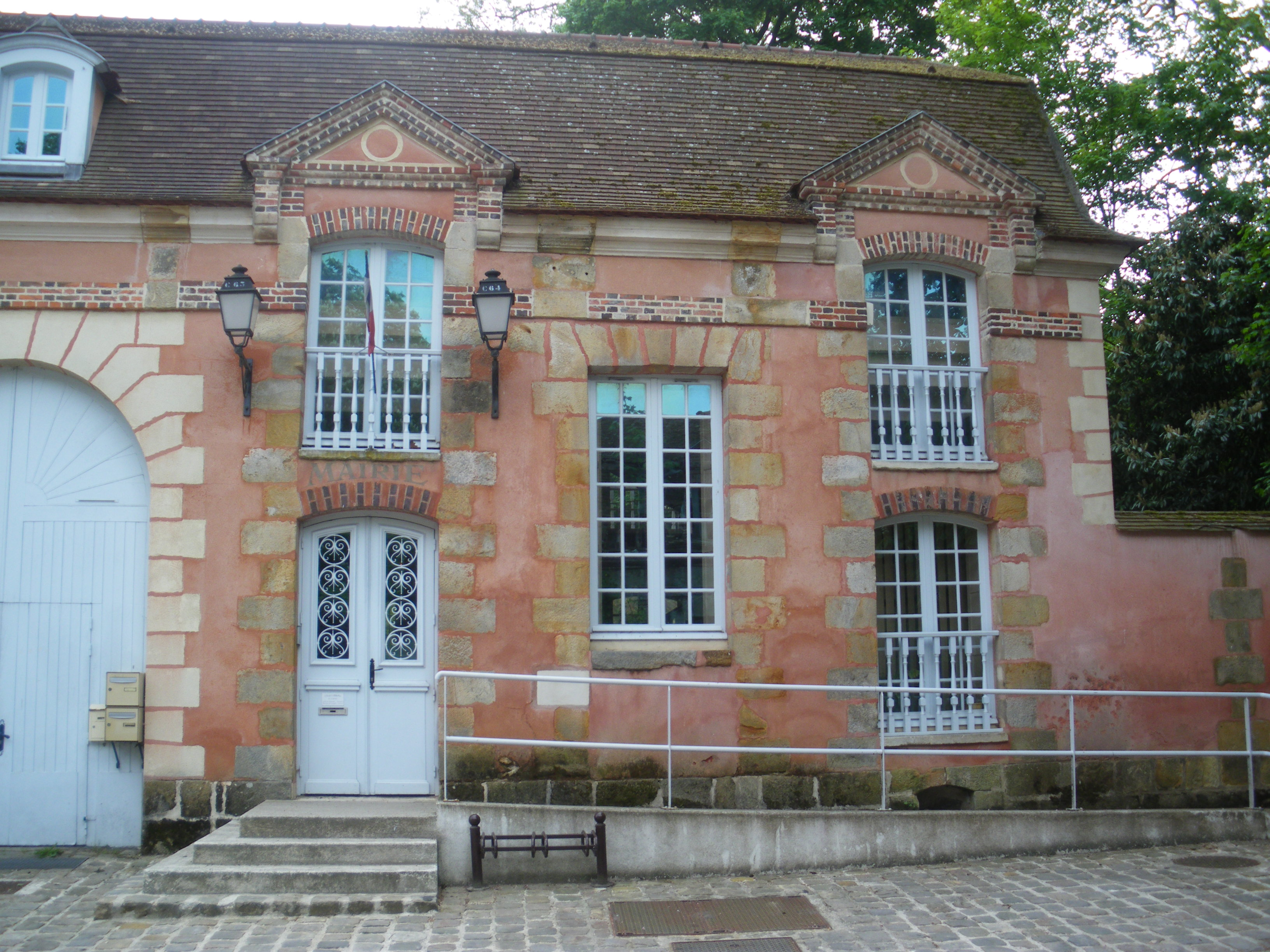
- The town hall of Angervilliers

- Coat of arms
- Location of Angervilliers
- Location within France Location within Île-de-France (region)
- Coordinates: 48°35′31″N 2°03′54″E
- Country: France
- Region: Île-de-France
- Department: Essonne
- Arrondissement: Palaiseau
- Canton: Dourdan
- Intercommunality: Pays de Limours

Government
  - Mayor (2020–2026): Dany Boyer
- Area^{1}: 9.01 km^{2} (3.48 sq mi)
- Highest elevation: 163 m (535 ft)
- Lowest elevation: 77 m (253 ft)
- Population (2023): 1,772
  - Density: 197/km^{2} (509/sq mi)
- Time zone: UTC+01:00 (CET)
  - Summer (DST): UTC+02:00 (CEST)
- INSEE/Postal code: 91017 /91470
- ^{1} French Land Register data, which excludes lakes, ponds, glaciers > 1 km^{2} (0.386 sq mi or 247 acres) and river estuaries.

Angervilliers (French pronunciation: [ɑ̃ʒɛʁvilje]) is a commune in the Essonne department in Île-de-France in northern France.

Inhabitants are known as Angervilliérois.

== See also ==
- Communes of the Essonne department
