= Roinville, Essonne =

Commune in Île-de-France, France

Roinville
- Commune
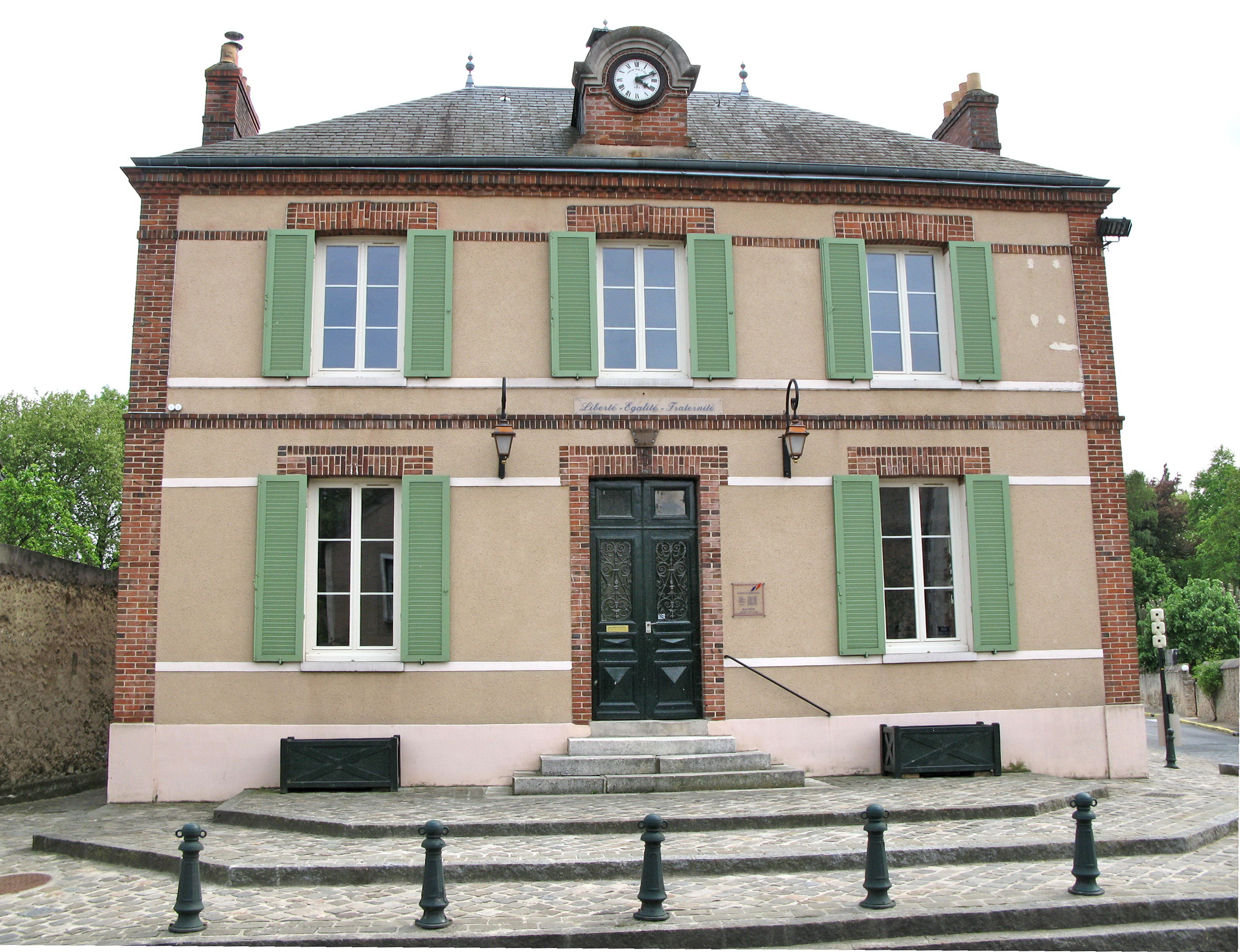
- The town hall in Roinville

- Coat of arms
- Location of Roinville
- Location within France Location within Île-de-France (region)
- Coordinates: 48°31′49″N 2°02′47″E
- Country: France
- Region: Île-de-France
- Department: Essonne
- Arrondissement: Étampes
- Canton: Dourdan
- Intercommunality: Le Dourdannais en Hurepoix

Government
  - Mayor (2020–2026): Guillaume Bellinelli
- Area^{1}: 13.40 km^{2} (5.17 sq mi)
- Highest elevation: 163 m (535 ft)
- Lowest elevation: 82 m (269 ft)
- Population (2023): 1,319
  - Density: 98.43/km^{2} (254.9/sq mi)
- Time zone: UTC+01:00 (CET)
  - Summer (DST): UTC+02:00 (CEST)
- INSEE/Postal code: 91525 /91410
- ^{1} French Land Register data, which excludes lakes, ponds, glaciers > 1 km^{2} (0.386 sq mi or 247 acres) and river estuaries.

Roinville (French pronunciation: [ʁwɛ̃vil]), also called Roinville-sous-Dourdan, is a commune in the Essonne department in Île-de-France in northern France.

Inhabitants of Roinville are known as Roinvillois.

== See also ==
- Communes of the Essonne department
