= Vaugrigneuse =

Commune in Île-de-France, France

- Commune
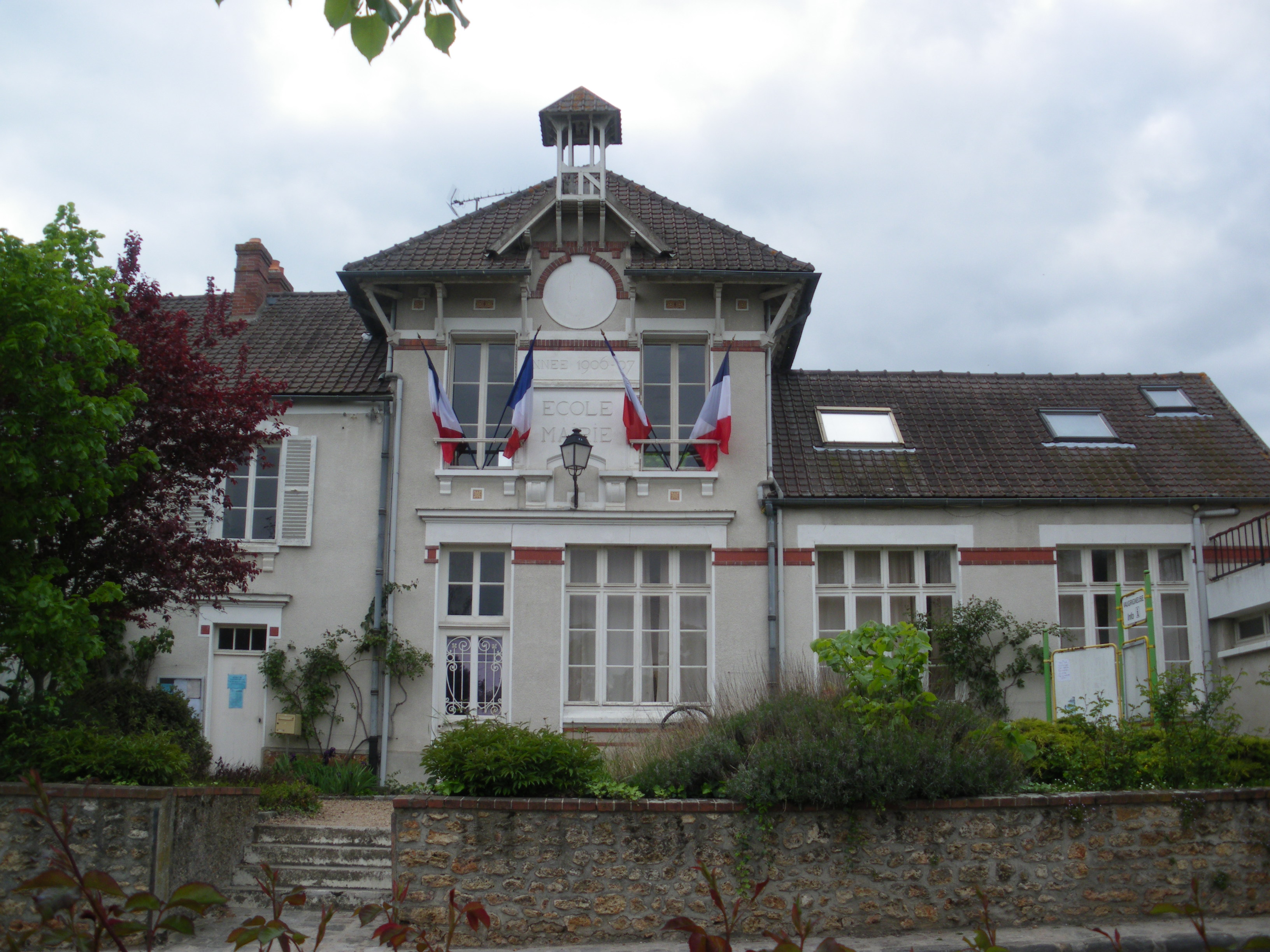
- The town hall in Vaugrigneuse
- Location of Vaugrigneuse
- Location within France Location within Île-de-France (region)
- Coordinates: 48°36′09″N 2°07′15″E
- Country: France
- Region: Île-de-France
- Department: Essonne
- Arrondissement: Palaiseau
- Canton: Dourdan
- Intercommunality: Pays de Limours

Government
  - Mayor (2020–2026): Thérèse Blanchier
- Area^{1}: 6.06 km^{2} (2.34 sq mi)
- Highest elevation: 129 m (423 ft)
- Lowest elevation: 70 m (230 ft)
- Population (2023): 1,458
  - Density: 241/km^{2} (623/sq mi)
- Time zone: UTC+01:00 (CET)
  - Summer (DST): UTC+02:00 (CEST)
- INSEE/Postal code: 91634 /91640
- ^{1} French Land Register data, which excludes lakes, ponds, glaciers > 1 km^{2} (0.386 sq mi or 247 acres) and river estuaries.

Vaugrigneuse (French pronunciation: [voɡʁiɲøz]) is a commune in the Essonne department in Île-de-France in northern France.

Inhabitants of Vaugrigneuse are known as Valgrigniens.

== See also ==
- Communes of the Essonne department
