= Janvry, Essonne =

Commune in Île-de-France, France

Janvry
- Commune
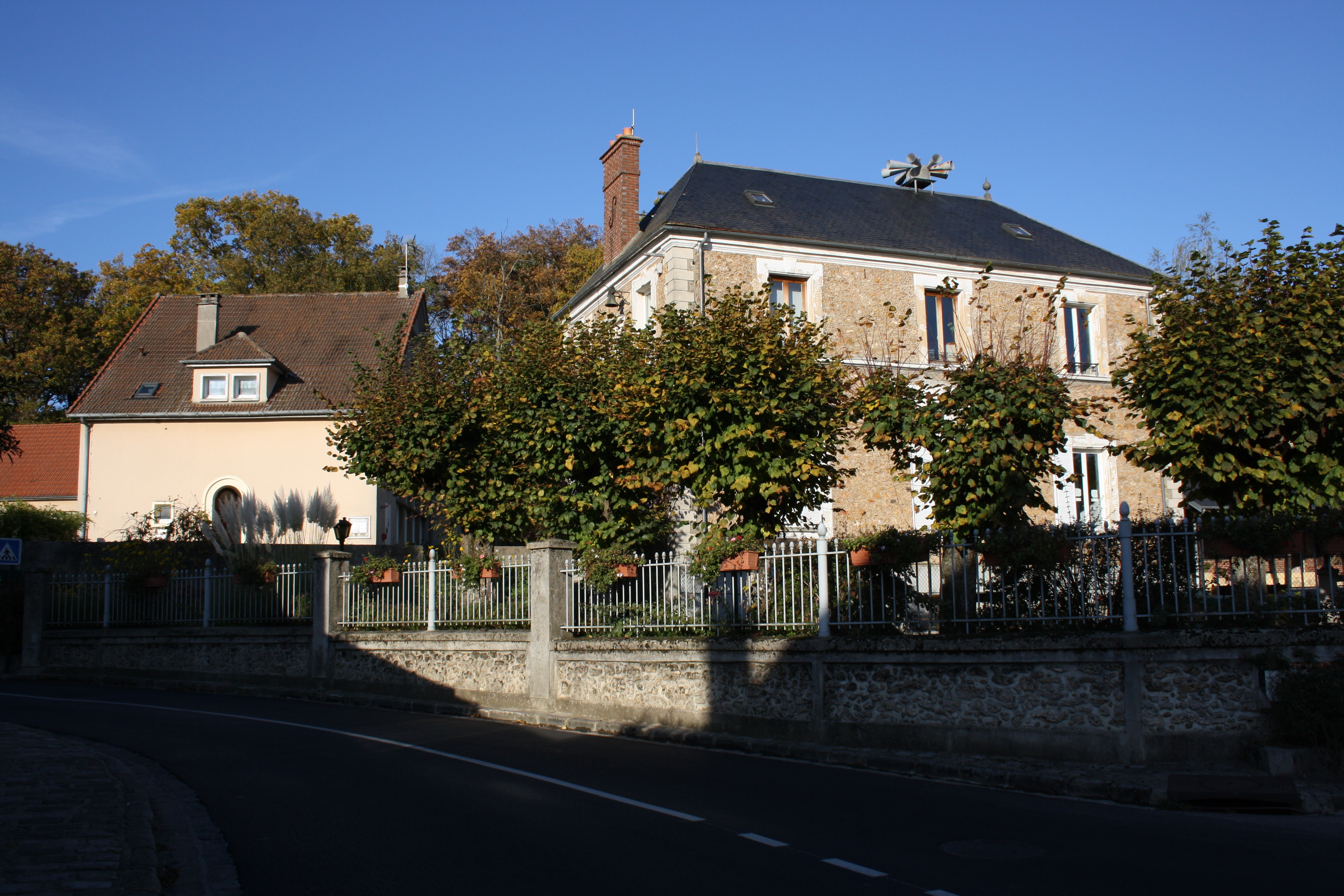
- Janvry town hall and school
- Location of Janvry
- Location within France Location within Île-de-France (region)
- Coordinates: 48°38′48″N 2°09′23″E
- Country: France
- Region: Île-de-France
- Department: Essonne
- Arrondissement: Palaiseau
- Canton: Dourdan
- Intercommunality: Pays de Limours

Government
  - Mayor (2020–2026): Christian Schoettl
- Area^{1}: 8.24 km^{2} (3.18 sq mi)
- Highest elevation: 172 m (564 ft)
- Lowest elevation: 113 m (371 ft)
- Population (2023): 654
  - Density: 79.4/km^{2} (206/sq mi)
- Time zone: UTC+01:00 (CET)
  - Summer (DST): UTC+02:00 (CEST)
- INSEE/Postal code: 91319 /91640
- ^{1} French Land Register data, which excludes lakes, ponds, glaciers > 1 km^{2} (0.386 sq mi or 247 acres) and river estuaries.

Janvry (French pronunciation: [ʒɑ̃vʁi]) is a commune in the Essonne department and Île-de-France region of north-central France.

The inhabitants of Janvry are known in French as les Janvryssois.

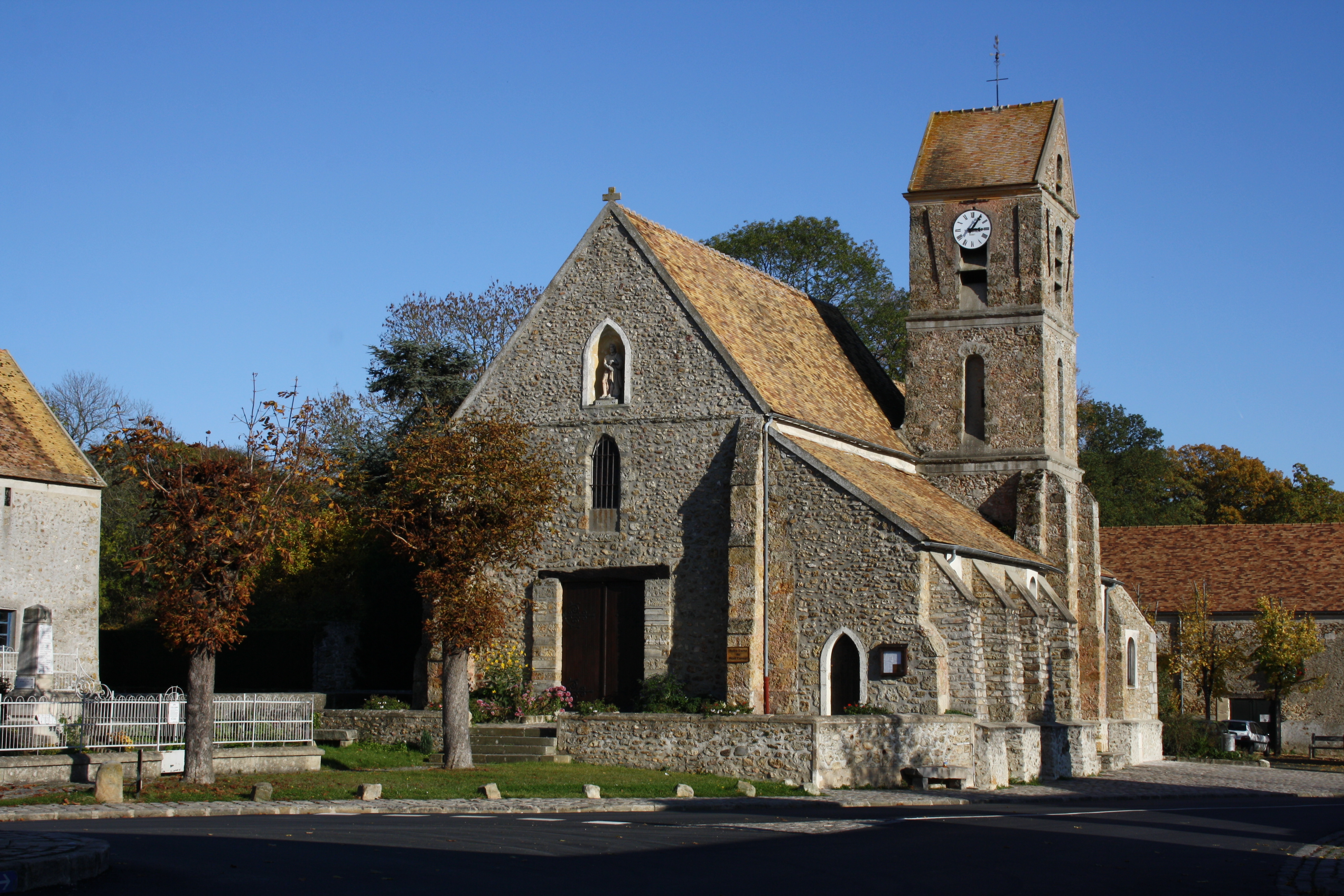
Our Lady of Mount Carmel, Janvry

== See also ==
- Château de Janvry
- Communes of the Essonne department
