= Les Molières =

Commune in Île-de-France, France

- Commune
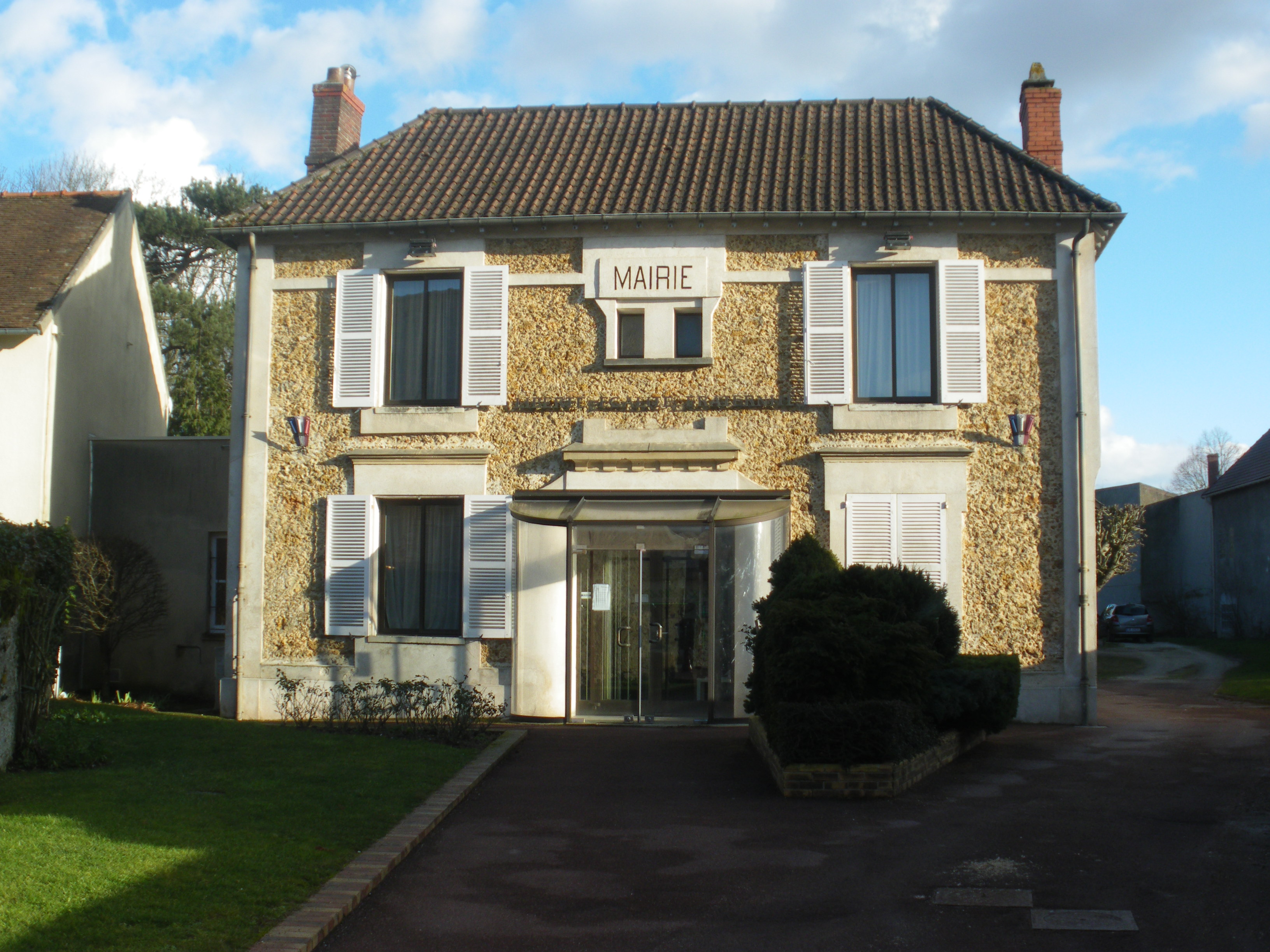
- The town hall in Les Molières
- Location of Les Molières
- Location within France Location within Île-de-France (region)
- Coordinates: 48°40′23″N 2°04′09″E
- Country: France
- Region: Île-de-France
- Department: Essonne
- Arrondissement: Palaiseau
- Canton: Gif-sur-Yvette
- Intercommunality: Pays de Limours

Government
  - Mayor (2023–2026): Jean-Paul Gruffeille
- Area^{1}: 7.02 km^{2} (2.71 sq mi)
- Highest elevation: 177 m (581 ft)
- Lowest elevation: 100 m (330 ft)
- Population (2023): 1,975
  - Density: 281/km^{2} (729/sq mi)
- Time zone: UTC+01:00 (CET)
  - Summer (DST): UTC+02:00 (CEST)
- INSEE/Postal code: 91411 /91470
- ^{1} French Land Register data, which excludes lakes, ponds, glaciers > 1 km^{2} (0.386 sq mi or 247 acres) and river estuaries.

Les Molières (French pronunciation: [le mɔljɛʁ]) is a commune in the Essonne department in Île-de-France in northern France.

Inhabitants of Les Molières are known as Molièrois in French.

== See also ==
- Communes of the Essonne department
