= Saint-Maurice-Montcouronne =

Commune in Île-de-France, France

- Commune
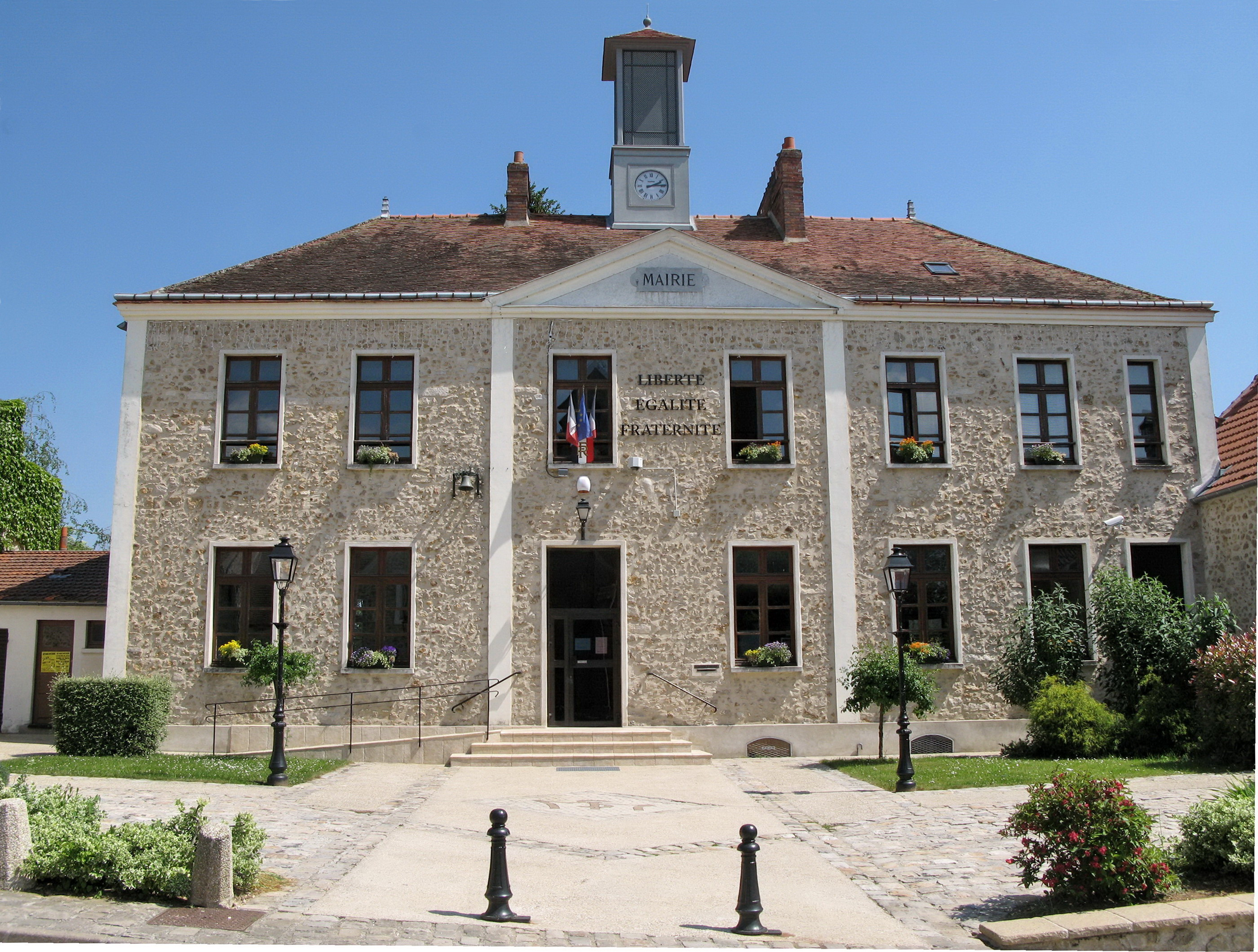
- The town hall in Saint-Maurice-Montcouronne

- Coat of arms
- Location of Saint-Maurice-Montcouronne
- Location within France Location within Île-de-France (region)
- Coordinates: 48°34′53″N 2°07′27″E
- Country: France
- Region: Île-de-France
- Department: Essonne
- Arrondissement: Palaiseau
- Canton: Dourdan
- Intercommunality: Pays de Limours

Government
  - Mayor (2020–2026): William Berrichillo
- Area^{1}: 9.03 km^{2} (3.49 sq mi)
- Highest elevation: 157 m (515 ft)
- Lowest elevation: 54 m (177 ft)
- Population (2023): 1,543
  - Density: 171/km^{2} (443/sq mi)
- Time zone: UTC+01:00 (CET)
  - Summer (DST): UTC+02:00 (CEST)
- INSEE/Postal code: 91568 /91530
- ^{1} French Land Register data, which excludes lakes, ponds, glaciers > 1 km^{2} (0.386 sq mi or 247 acres) and river estuaries.

Saint-Maurice-Montcouronne (French pronunciation: [sɛ̃ mɔʁis mɔ̃kuʁɔn]) is a commune in the Essonne department in Île-de-France in northern France.

Inhabitants of Saint-Maurice-Montcouronne are known as Saint-Mauriciens.

== See also ==
- Communes of the Essonne department
