= Saint-Jean-de-Beauregard =

Commune in Île-de-France, France

- Commune
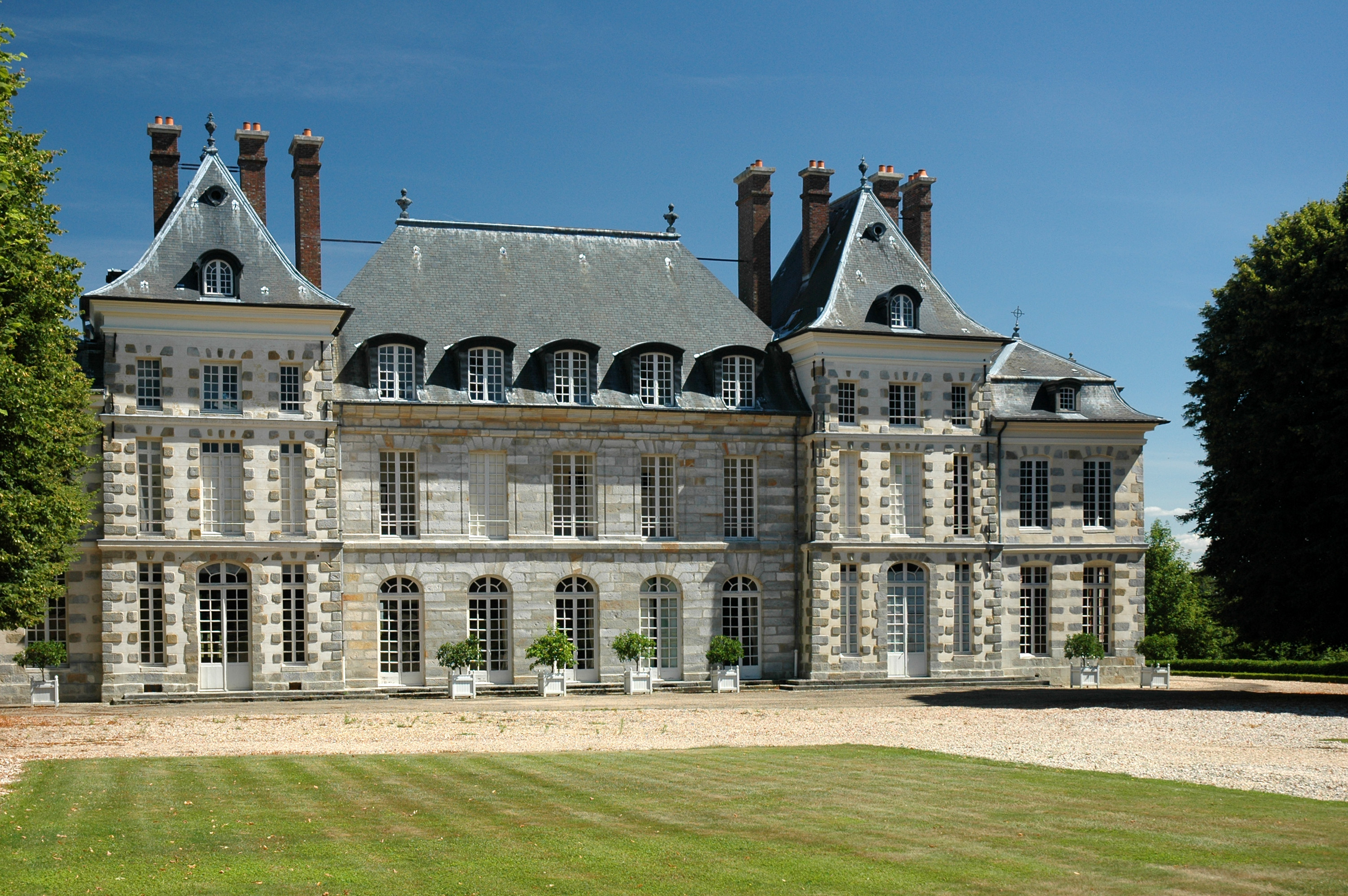
- Château de Saint-Jean de Beauregard
- Location of Saint-Jean-de-Beauregard
- Location within France Location within Île-de-France (region)
- Coordinates: 48°40′11″N 2°10′03″E
- Country: France
- Region: Île-de-France
- Department: Essonne
- Arrondissement: Palaiseau
- Canton: Les Ulis
- Intercommunality: Pays de Limours

Government
  - Mayor (2020–2026): François Frontera
- Area^{1}: 3.97 km^{2} (1.53 sq mi)
- Highest elevation: 169 m (554 ft)
- Lowest elevation: 100 m (330 ft)
- Population (2023): 471
  - Density: 119/km^{2} (307/sq mi)
- Demonym: Bellinagardinois
- Time zone: UTC+01:00 (CET)
  - Summer (DST): UTC+02:00 (CEST)
- INSEE/Postal code: 91560 /91940
- ^{1} French Land Register data, which excludes lakes, ponds, glaciers > 1 km^{2} (0.386 sq mi or 247 acres) and river estuaries.

Saint-Jean-de-Beauregard (French pronunciation: [sɛ̃ ʒɑ̃ də boʁ(ə)ɡaʁ]) is a commune in the Essonne department in the Île-de-France region in Northern France. It is best known for its 17th-century Château de Saint-Jean de Beauregard (or Château de Beauregard).

Inhabitants of Saint-Jean-de-Beauregard are known as Bellinagardinois (masculine) and Bellinagardinoises (feminine) in French.

== Gallery ==
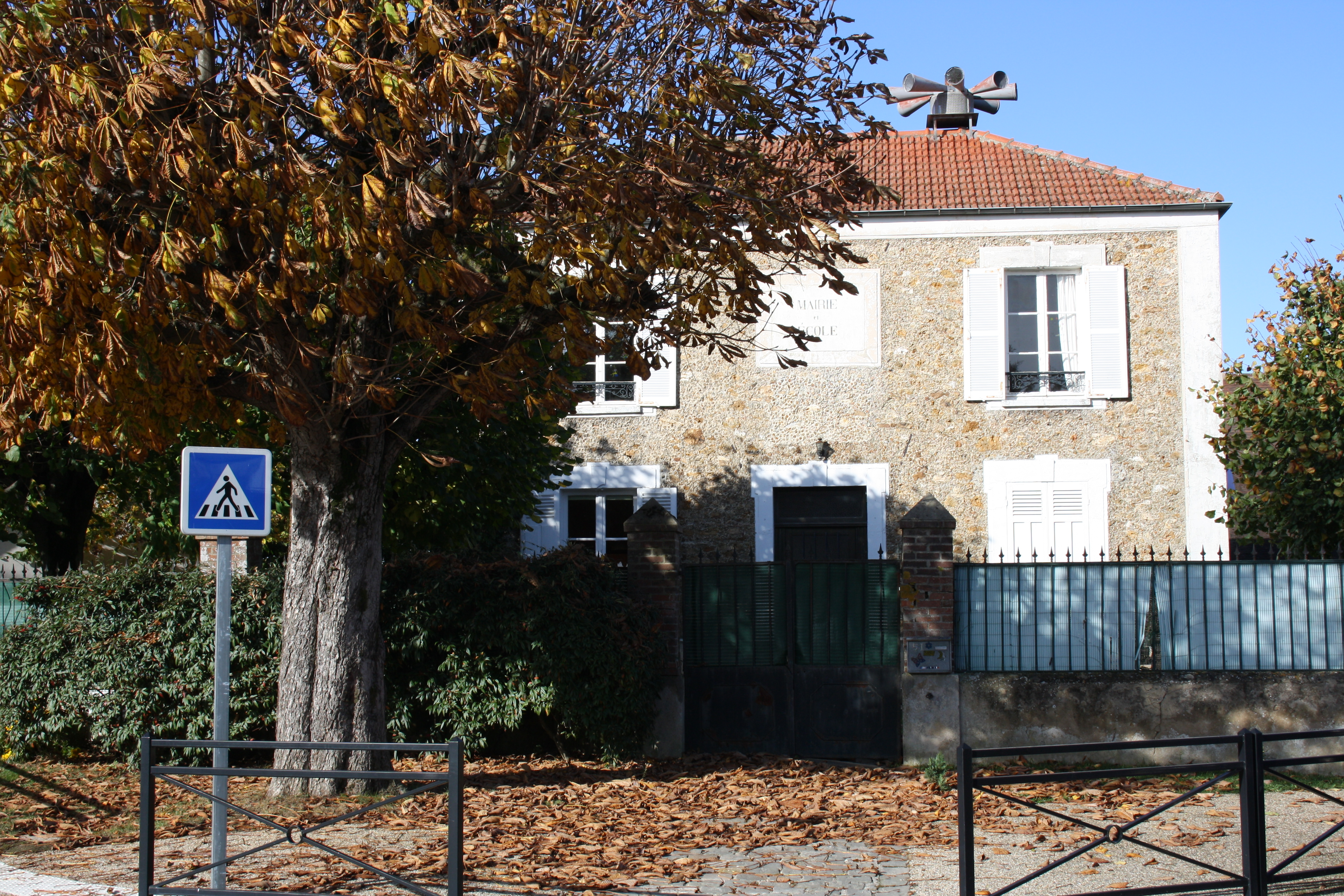
Town hall

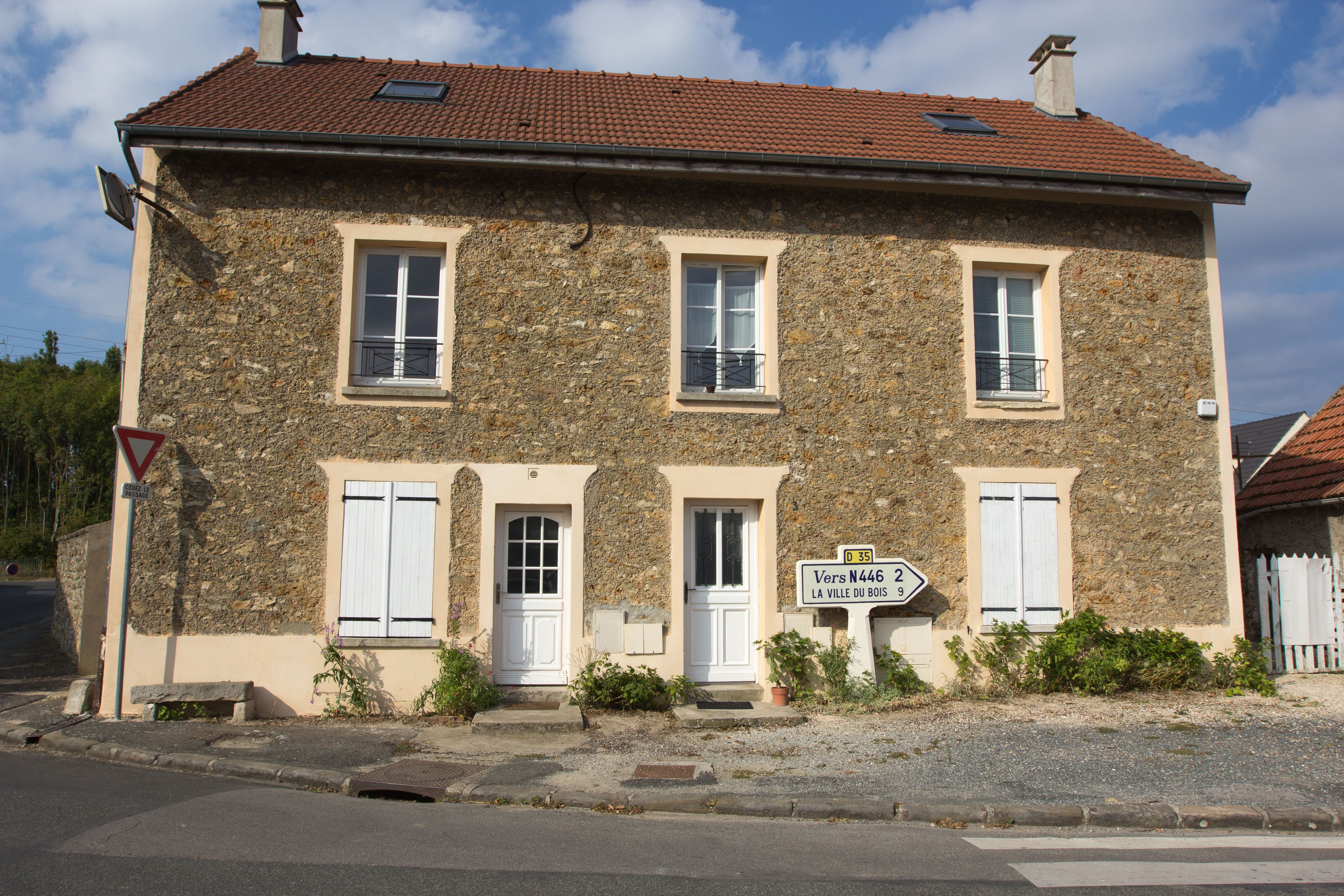
Town centre

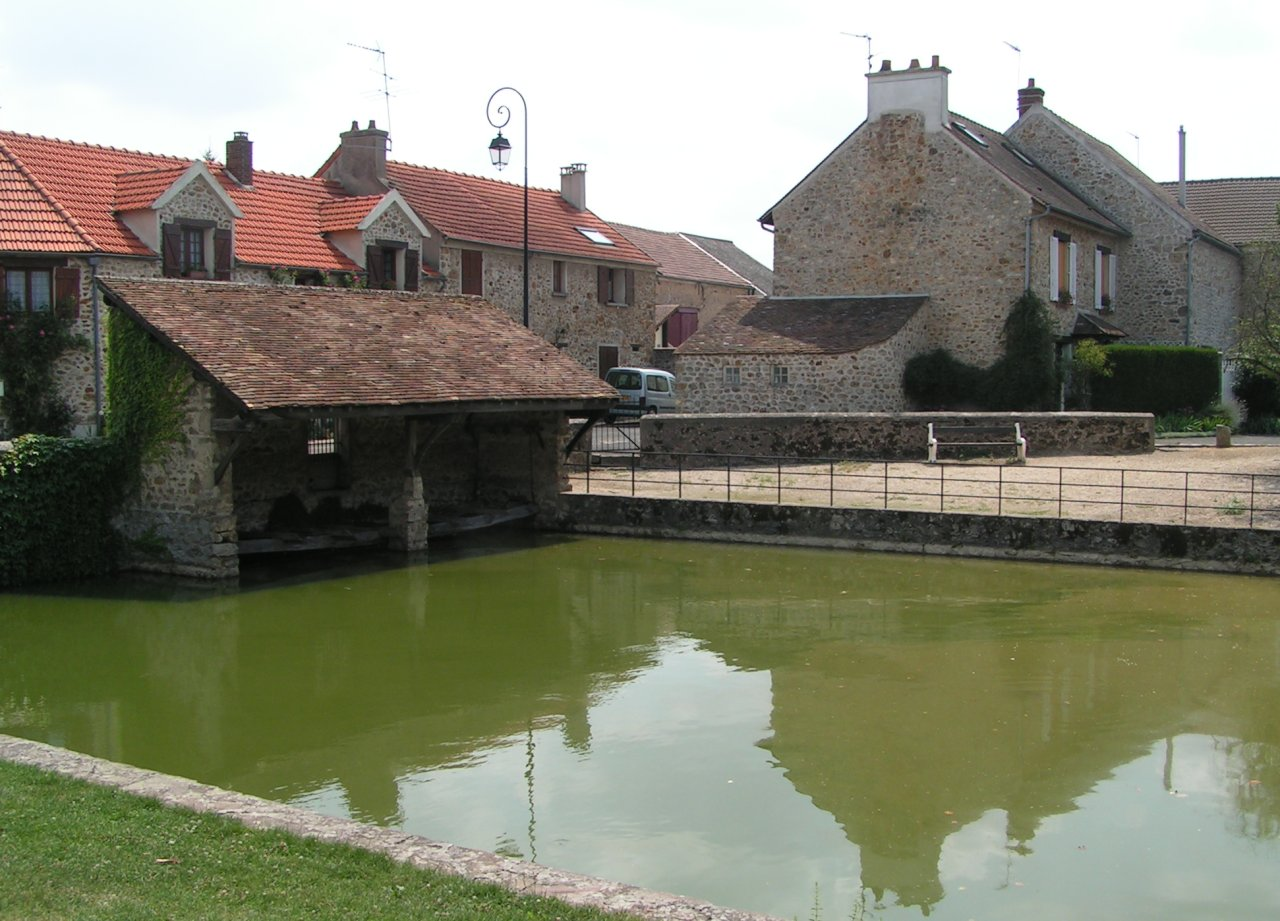
Public laundry

== See also ==
- Communes of the Essonne department
