= Forges-les-Bains =

Commune in Île-de-France, France

- Commune
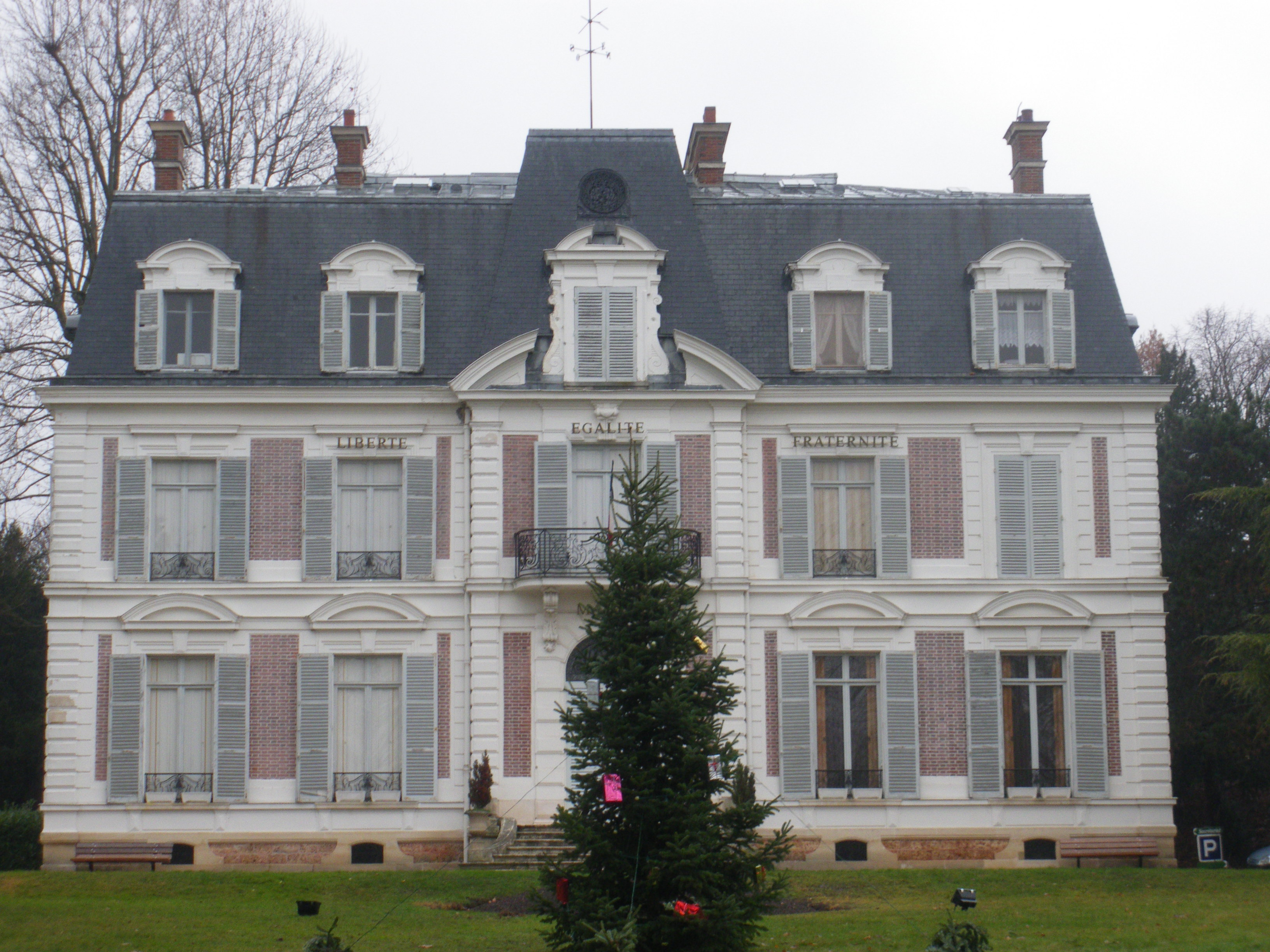
- The town hall of Forges-les-Bains
- Location of Forges-les-Bains
- Location within France Location within Île-de-France (region)
- Coordinates: 48°37′41″N 2°06′00″E
- Country: France
- Region: Île-de-France
- Department: Essonne
- Arrondissement: Palaiseau
- Canton: Dourdan
- Intercommunality: Pays de Limours

Government
  - Mayor (2020–2026): Séverine Martin
- Area^{1}: 14.58 km^{2} (5.63 sq mi)
- Highest elevation: 169 m (554 ft)
- Lowest elevation: 92 m (302 ft)
- Population (2023): 4,241
  - Density: 290.9/km^{2} (753.4/sq mi)
- Time zone: UTC+01:00 (CET)
  - Summer (DST): UTC+02:00 (CEST)
- INSEE/Postal code: 91249 /91470
- ^{1} French Land Register data, which excludes lakes, ponds, glaciers > 1 km^{2} (0.386 sq mi or 247 acres) and river estuaries.

Forges-les-Bains (French pronunciation: [fɔʁʒ le bɛ̃]) is a commune in the Essonne department in Île-de-France in northern France.

== Population ==
Historical population
Year	Pop.	±% p.a.
1968	1,164	—
1975	1,374	+2.40%
1982	2,017	+5.64%
1990	2,757	+3.98%
1999	3,229	+1.77%
2007	3,671	+1.62%
2012	3,754	+0.45%
2017	3,851	+0.51%
2023	4,241	+1.62%
Source: INSEE

Inhabitants of Forges-les-Bains are known as Forgeois in French.

== See also ==
- Communes of the Essonne department
