= Orléanais =

Former province of France

Duchy of Orléans Duché d'Orléanais
- 1498–1791
- Flag Coat of arms

- Location of Orléanais within France (1789 borders)
- Capital: Orléans
- Demonym: Orléanois
- Government
  - Type: Province
- King of France
  - 1498–1515: Louis XII
  - 1774–1791: Louis XVI
- Governor of Orléanais
  - 1498–1504: Guillaume de Montmorency
  - 1784–1791: Aymery Louis Roger
- History
  - Established: 1498
  - Province dissolved: 1791
Preceded by
County of Orléans
County of Blois
County of Chartres
County of Étampes
Succeeded by
Loiret
Loir-et-Cher
Eure-et-Loir
Seine-et-Oise
Yonne
- Today part of: France

The Duchy of Orléanais (French pronunciation: [ɔʁleanɛ]) is a former province of France, which was created during the Renaissance by merging four former counties and towns. However after the French Revolution, the province was dissolved in 1791 and succeeded by five départments (less some communes to others).

== Dukedom ==
The Duchy of Orléanais was created in 1344 by raising the former County of Orléans to a Dukedom under King Philip VI for his second son Philip de Valois. With the creation of the duchy, several localities around the former county were also integrated, they included the County of Beaugency and the Seigneurities of Neuville-aux-Bois, Yèvre-le-Châtel, Châteauneuf-en-Thymerais, Lorris, and Boiscommun. In 1375, Prince Philip died without a legitimate heir, the title of 'Duke of Orléans' and the duchy itself were merged into the royal domain (crown lands) of the King of France.

Location of Orléanais within modern departments.

In 1392, the duchy was re-created by King Charles VI for his younger brother Louis de Valois-Orléans. The duke was later succeeded by his son Charles de Valois-Orléans who reigned until 1465 when he died of natural causes. He was succeeded by his own son Louis de Valois-Orléans, who became King Louis XII in 1495 and the title was merged into the crown once more.

In 1519, the dukedom was once again created by King Francis I for his second son Henri de Valois-Angoulême. However, Henri later renounced his title when he became Dauphin of France (heir to the throne) in 1536. He was then succeeded by his son Charles de Valois-Angoulême who reigned as duke until he died of the flu in 1545.

In 1549, the dukedom was again created for the one year old Prince Louis de Valois-Angoulême, who died just a few months into his tenure. He was succeeded by his older brother Charles, who became King Charles IX in 1560 and renounced his dukedom. Charles was succeeded by Henri de Valois-Angoulême, but dropped his title in 1566 in exchange for the Dukedom of Anjou. In February 1566, the title was transferred to Queen Consort Chatherine de' Medici as Duchess of Orléans. She died in 1589 and the dukedome was once again merged into the crown.

In 1626, Louis XIII re-created the Dukedom of Orléans for his younger brother Gaston, Duke of Anjou who reigned as duke until 1660 when he died of natural causes. Once again the title merged into the crown for the last time.

Finally in 1661 the Dukedom of Orléans was created for the final time by King Louis XIV for his brother Prince Philip, Duke of Anjou. He was succeeded by his son, then his grandson, great-grandson, and finally great-great grandson Louis Philippe II. In 1793, he was executed for treason during the Reign of Terror and succeeded by his son Louis Philippe III (later King Louis Philippe). The title then transferred for the last time to Prince Ferdinand Philippe de Orléans who died in an accident in 1842 and the title was dissolved as the Kingdom of France itself was dissolved in 1830.

== Province ==
The Province of Orléanais roughly corresponds to the old Duchy of Orléanais and was created on 7 April 1498 when Louis II became King Louis XII. The new province incorporated local counties, including the Orléans, Blois, Vendôme, Chartrès, and Étampes. With the duchy absorbed into the royal domain, it was transformed into a province (really a military district instead of the equivalent of an English county or American state).

In 1558, the province was elevated into a Generality (Géneralité) or General Government (Gouvernment Général) and a permanent governor was installed in the region. During this period, the Duke of Orléans was de jure owner of the land, but the Governor was de facto overseer of the province.

In 1776, as part of a reorganisation of the military general governments (provinces), the governments were divided into three categories. The highest or "most important" were the First Category including notably Rennes, Lyon, Aix, Strasbourg, and Metz; the Second Category included Orléanais, La Rochelle, Angoulême, Nevers; and the Special Category including Paris and Monaco. The first category's military governor was to be a Marshal of France, the second class were reserved for Lieutenant Generals, and the special regions were assigned by the King.

In 1791, under the auspicious of 'unity of France', the provinces were dissolved and succeeded by smaller départments. The former province was split between several new départments: Loiret, Loir-et-Cher, Eure-et-Loir, Seine-et-Oise, and Yonne.

Some communes joined other départments, including:

- Cher (Brinon-sur-Sauldre)
- Essonne (Abbéville-la-Rivière, Angerville, Authon-la-Plaine, Auvers-Saint-Georges, Blandy, Boigneville, Bois-Herpin, Boissy-la-Rivière, Boissy-le-Cutté, Bouville, Brouy, Cerny, Chalo-Saint-Mars, Chalou-Moulineux, Chatignonville, Champmotteux, Chauffour-lès-Étréchy, Courdimanche-sur-Essonne, D'Huison-Longueville, Estouches, Étampes, Étréchy, Fontaine-la-Rivière, La Forêt-Sainte-Croix, Gironville-sur-Essonne, Guillerval, Maisse, Marolles-en-Beauce, Méréville, Mérobert, Mespuits, Monnerville, Morigny-Champigny, Ormoy-la-Rivière, Orveau, Plessis-Saint-Benoist, Prunay-sur-Essonne, Puiselet-le-Marais, Pussay, Richarville, Roinvilliers, Saclas, Saint-Cyr-la-Rivière, Saint-Escobille, Congerville-Thionville, Valpuiseaux, Vayres-sur-Essonne, and Villeneuve-sur-Auvers)
- Indre-et-Loire (Chemillé-sur-Dême, Épeigné-sur-Dême, La Ferrière, Les Hermites, and Monthodon)
- Sarthe (La Chapelle-Huon, Marolles-lès-Saint-Calais, Poncé-sur-le-Loir, Ruillé-sur-Loir, Saint-Calais, and Saint-Gervais-de-Vic)
- Seine-et-Marne (Boulancourt and Buthiers)
- Yvelines (Ablis, Allainville, Boinville-le-Gaillard, Orsonville, Paray-Douaville, Prunay-en-Yvelines, and Saint-Martin-de-Bréthencourt)

== Administration ==
=== Governors ===
A governor of a province in France before the revolution was initially the representative of the King in the area and held no real power. Until the transformations under Louis XIV, the governorship of a province was more of a de jure appointment, and had no status in decision making. However, after Louis XIV's reforms, the governorship of a province transformed into a military-held appointment. From then, the governor was not just the King's representative, but also military commander of the area. In addition to his military duties, the governor was de facto leader of the province while the titular holder (ex: Duke of Orléans) was de jure owner of the province. Below is a list of the Governors of Orléanais:

Portrait	Name	Tenure	Appointee
Portrait de Guillaume de Montmorency - MBA Lyon	Guillaume de Montmorency, Seigneur of Châteauneuf and of Damville	1498 – 1504	Louis XII
?uestionmark	Lancelot du Lac, Seigneur of Chamerolles and of Chilleurs	1504 – 1536	Louis XII
?uestionmark	Claude du Lac, Baron of Broyes, Seigneur of Chamerolles and of Chilleurs	1537 – 1548	Francis I
Blason de Brou	Claude Robertet, Baron of Alluye and of Brou	1548 – 1563	Henry II
?uestionmark	Philibert de Marcilly, Seigneur of Sipierre	1563 – 1565	Charles IX
	François de Bourbon, Duke of Montpensier	1565 – 1569	Charles IX
	Artus de Cossé-Brissac, Baron of Gonnor, Count of Secondigny	1569 – 1582	Charles IX
	Philippe Hurault, Count of Chiverny and of Limoux	1582	Henry III
?uestionmark	François de Balzac, Seigneur of Entraigues	1582 – 1588	Henry III
?uestionmark	Guillaume Charles de Balzac, Seigneur of Marcoussy	1588 – 1596	Henry III
	François d'Orléans Longueville, Count of Saint-Pol	1596 – 1615	Henry IV
?uestionmark	Léonor II d'Orléans, Duke of Fronsac	1615 – 1622	Louis XIII
?uestionmark	François de Valois, Duke of Fronsac	1622 – 1630	Louis XIII
Chambord - tableau Gaston d'Orléans	Gaston de Bourbon, Duke of Orléans	1630 – 1634	Louis XIII
?uestionmark	Charles d'Escoubleau de Sourdis, Marquis of Alluyes	1635 – 21 December 1666	Louis XIII
?uestionmark	Paul d'Escoubleau de Sourdis, Marquis of Alluyes	30 March 1667 – 1690	Louis XIV
Le cardinal François de Sourdis par Le Bernin	François d'Escoubleau, Count of Sourdis, Seigner of Gaujac, Estillac, and of Chabanais	8 January 1690 – 21 September 1707	Louis XIV
1710 portrait of Louis Antoine de Pardaillan de Gondrin, Duke of Antin wearing the Order of the Holy Spirit by Hyacinthe Rigaud (Versailles)	Louis-Antoine de Pardaillan de Gondron, Marquis of Antin and of Montespan, Duke of Antin	28 September 1707 – 2 November 1736	Louis XIV
?uestionmark	Louis de Pardaillan de Gondrin, Duke of Antin	2 November 1736 – 9 December 1743	Louis XV
?uestionmark	Louis de Pardaillan de Gondrin, Duke of Antin	11 December 1743 – 13 September 1757	Louis XV
?uestionmark	François Charles, Count of Rochechouart-Faudoas	2 November 1757 – 25 August 1784	Louis XV
?uestionmark	Aymery Louis Roger, Count of Rochechouart-Faudoas	7 November 1784 – 1 January 1791	Louis XVI

=== Assemblies ===
In 1558, most provinces in France were separated further into tax districts or Élections. Orléanais included the following: Beauce, Blésois, Vendômois, Bas-Vendômois, Chartrès, Dunois, and Gâtinais (only part).

The Généralite of Orléanis had a 52 member assembly in Orléans who worked alongside the Duke of Orléans to run the province. Among the notable presidents was Anne-Charles-Sigismond de Montmorency-Luxembourg, Duke of Montmorency-Luxembourg.
