= Val de Loire orléanais =

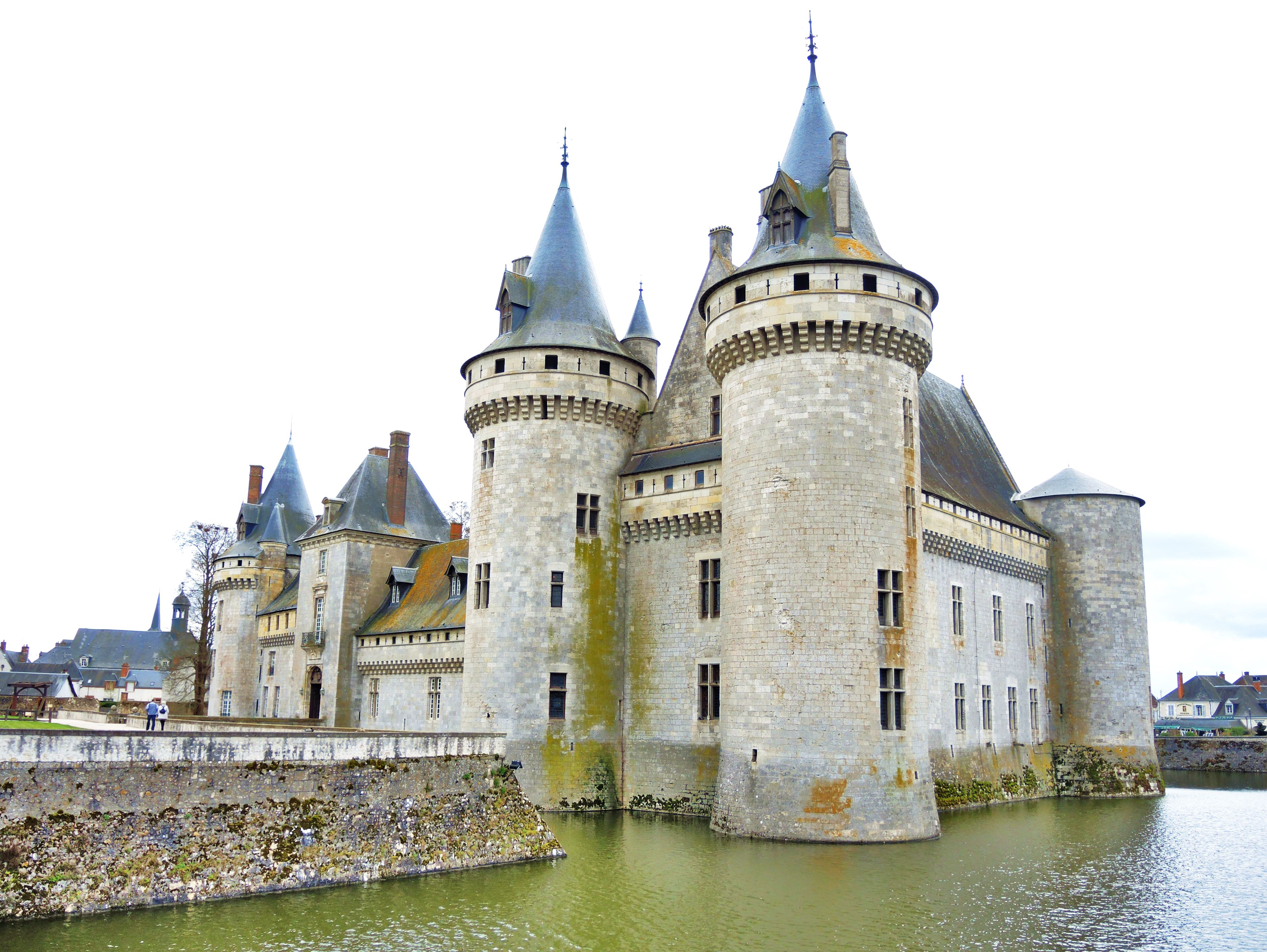
Château de Sully-sur-Loire.

Val de Loire orléanais is a natural region of France located in the heart of the Loiret department, in the Centre-Val de Loire region.

== Location ==
This natural region is located in the center of Loiret. It was named after the city of Orléans. With Val de Loire tourangeau, Blésois and Val d'Anjou, it is part of a larger natural region called Val de Loire.

This region is surrounded on the North by Beauce, in the East by the Forest of Orléans and Gâtinais, in the South by Sologne and in the West by Blésois.
