= Le Mérévillois =

Commune in Île-de-France, France

- Commune
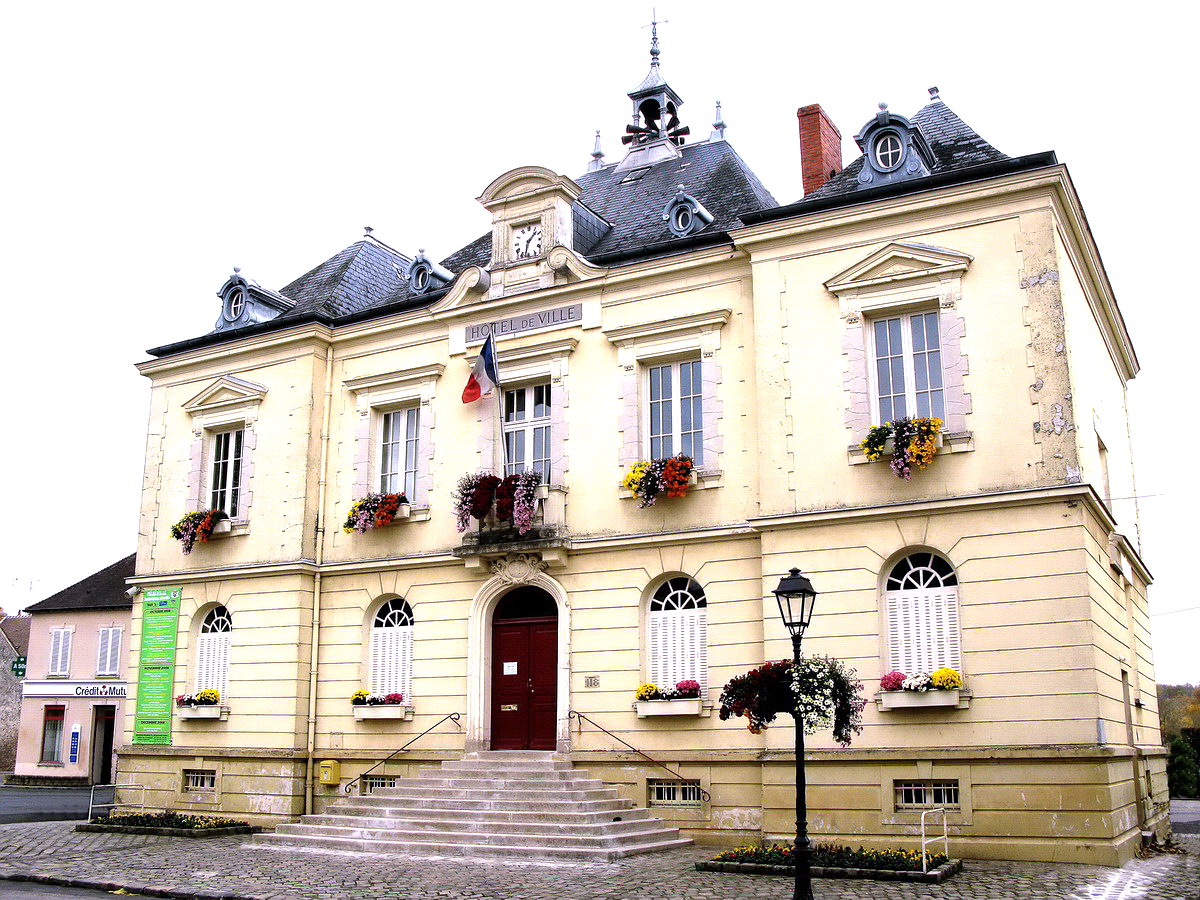
- The town hall in Le Mérévillois

- Coat of arms
- Location of Le Mérévillois
- Location within France Location within Île-de-France (region)
- Coordinates: 48°19′6″N 2°5′13″E
- Country: France
- Region: Île-de-France
- Department: Essonne
- Arrondissement: Étampes
- Canton: Étampes
- Intercommunality: CA Étampois Sud Essonne

Government
  - Mayor (2020–2026): Guy Desmurs
- Area^{1}: 32.97 km^{2} (12.73 sq mi)
- Highest elevation: 142 m (466 ft)
- Lowest elevation: 82 m (269 ft)
- Population (2023): 3,477
  - Density: 105.5/km^{2} (273.1/sq mi)
- Time zone: UTC+01:00 (CET)
  - Summer (DST): UTC+02:00 (CEST)
- INSEE/Postal code: 91390 /91660
- ^{1} French Land Register data, which excludes lakes, ponds, glaciers > 1 km^{2} (0.386 sq mi or 247 acres) and river estuaries.

Le Mérévillois (French pronunciation: [lə meʁevilwa]) is a commune in the department of Essonne.

It was established on 1 January 2019 from the amalgamation of the communes of Méréville and Estouches.

== Geography ==
=== Climate ===
Le Mérévillois has an oceanic climate (Köppen climate classification Cfb). The average annual temperature in Le Mérévillois is 11.1 °C (52.0 °F). The average annual rainfall is 639.1 mm (25.16 in) with May as the wettest month. The temperatures are highest on average in July, at around 19.3 °C (66.7 °F), and lowest in January, at around 3.8 °C (38.8 °F). The highest temperature ever recorded in Le Mérévillois was 42.0 °C (107.6 °F) on 25 July 2019; the coldest temperature ever recorded was −18.0 °C (−0.4 °F) on 17 January 1985.

Climate data for Le Mérévillois (1981−2010 normals, extremes 1979−2020)
Month	Jan	Feb	Mar	Apr	May	Jun	Jul	Aug	Sep	Oct	Nov	Dec	Year
Record high °C (°F)	16.0 (60.8)	21.2 (70.2)	24.0 (75.2)	30.0 (86.0)	32.0 (89.6)	37.0 (98.6)	42.0 (107.6)	41.2 (106.2)	34.0 (93.2)	30.2 (86.4)	22.0 (71.6)	16.5 (61.7)	42.0 (107.6)
Mean daily maximum °C (°F)	6.6 (43.9)	7.8 (46.0)	12.0 (53.6)	15.3 (59.5)	19.3 (66.7)	22.7 (72.9)	25.8 (78.4)	25.6 (78.1)	21.5 (70.7)	16.3 (61.3)	10.4 (50.7)	6.9 (44.4)	15.9 (60.6)
Daily mean °C (°F)	3.8 (38.8)	4.2 (39.6)	7.4 (45.3)	9.9 (49.8)	13.8 (56.8)	16.8 (62.2)	19.3 (66.7)	19.1 (66.4)	15.7 (60.3)	11.9 (53.4)	7.1 (44.8)	4.3 (39.7)	11.1 (52.0)
Mean daily minimum °C (°F)	1.0 (33.8)	0.6 (33.1)	2.8 (37.0)	4.6 (40.3)	8.3 (46.9)	10.9 (51.6)	12.8 (55.0)	12.6 (54.7)	9.9 (49.8)	7.4 (45.3)	3.8 (38.8)	1.6 (34.9)	6.4 (43.5)
Record low °C (°F)	−18.0 (−0.4)	−13.0 (8.6)	−13.2 (8.2)	−5.4 (22.3)	−2.0 (28.4)	−0.5 (31.1)	3.0 (37.4)	3.5 (38.3)	1.0 (33.8)	−4.0 (24.8)	−13.0 (8.6)	−13.5 (7.7)	−18.0 (−0.4)
Average precipitation mm (inches)	51.5 (2.03)	43.5 (1.71)	46.8 (1.84)	50.5 (1.99)	65.3 (2.57)	49.2 (1.94)	56.9 (2.24)	47.9 (1.89)	49.1 (1.93)	63.0 (2.48)	54.7 (2.15)	60.7 (2.39)	639.1 (25.16)
Average precipitation days (≥ 1.0 mm)	11.2	9.7	10.2	9.8	10.6	8.1	8.1	6.6	8.2	10.4	10.2	11.3	114.4
Source: Météo-France

== Population ==
Population data refer to the area corresponding with the commune as of January 2025.

Historical population
Year	Pop.	±% p.a.
1968	2,310	—
1975	2,480	+1.02%
1982	2,853	+2.02%
1990	3,033	+0.77%
1999	3,248	+0.76%
2007	3,381	+0.50%
2012	3,380	−0.01%
2017	3,347	−0.20%
2023	3,477	+0.64%
Source: INSEE
