= Château de Montespan =

Remains of a 13th-century French castle

Coordinates: 43°5′14″N 0°51′2″E

The Château de Montespan is the remains of a 13th-century castle in the commune of Montespan in the Haute-Garonne département of France.

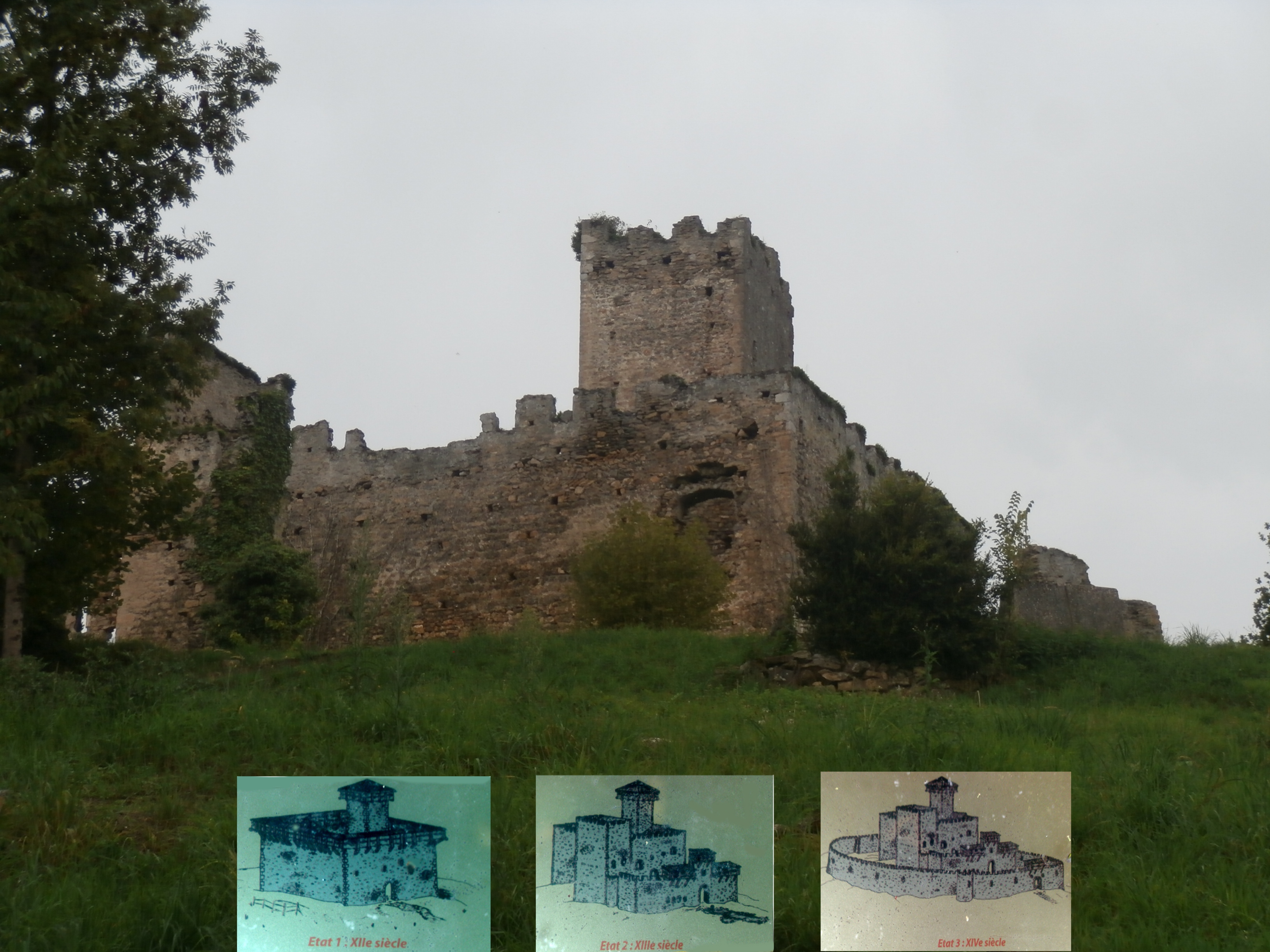
Château de Montespan

The property of the commune, it has been listed since 1926 as a monument historique by the French Ministry of Culture.

== See also ==
- List of castles in France
