= Villeneuve-sur-Auvers =

Commune in Île-de-France, France

- Commune
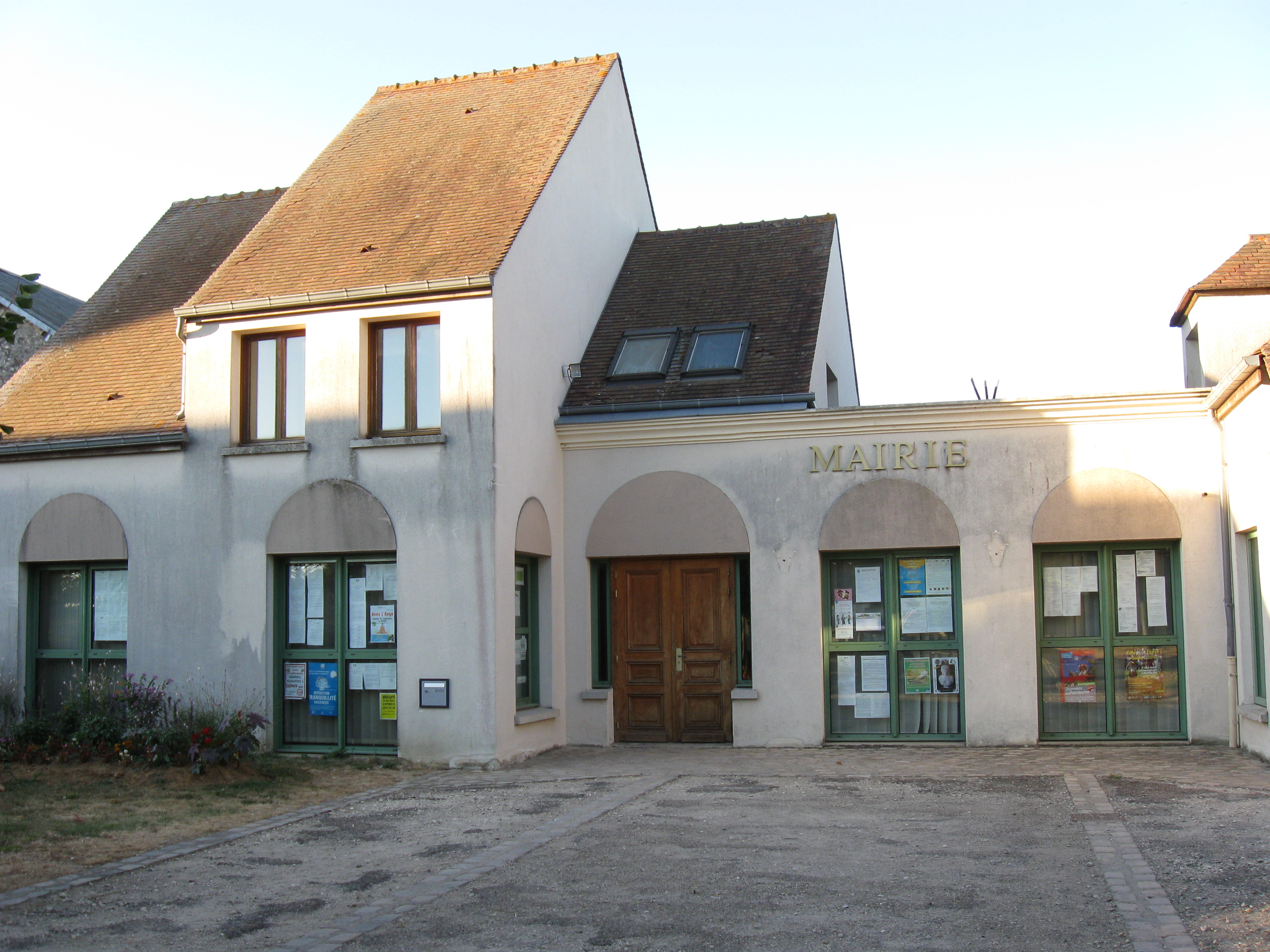
- The town hall in Villeneuve-sur-Auvers
- Location of Villeneuve-sur-Auvers
- Location within France Location within Île-de-France (region)
- Coordinates: 48°28′26″N 2°14′56″E
- Country: France
- Region: Île-de-France
- Department: Essonne
- Arrondissement: Étampes
- Canton: Étampes
- Intercommunality: Entre Juine et Renarde

Government
  - Mayor (2020–2026): Martine Huteau
- Area^{1}: 7.07 km^{2} (2.73 sq mi)
- Highest elevation: 157 m (515 ft)
- Lowest elevation: 85 m (279 ft)
- Population (2023): 593
  - Density: 83.9/km^{2} (217/sq mi)
- Time zone: UTC+01:00 (CET)
  - Summer (DST): UTC+02:00 (CEST)
- INSEE/Postal code: 91671 /91580
- ^{1} French Land Register data, which excludes lakes, ponds, glaciers > 1 km^{2} (0.386 sq mi or 247 acres) and river estuaries.

Villeneuve-sur-Auvers (French pronunciation: [vilnœv syʁ ovɛʁ], literally Villeneuve on Auvers) is a commune in the Essonne department in Île-de-France in northern France.

Inhabitants of Villeneuve-sur-Auvers are known as Villeneuvois.

== See also ==
- Communes of the Essonne department
