= Bloisian =

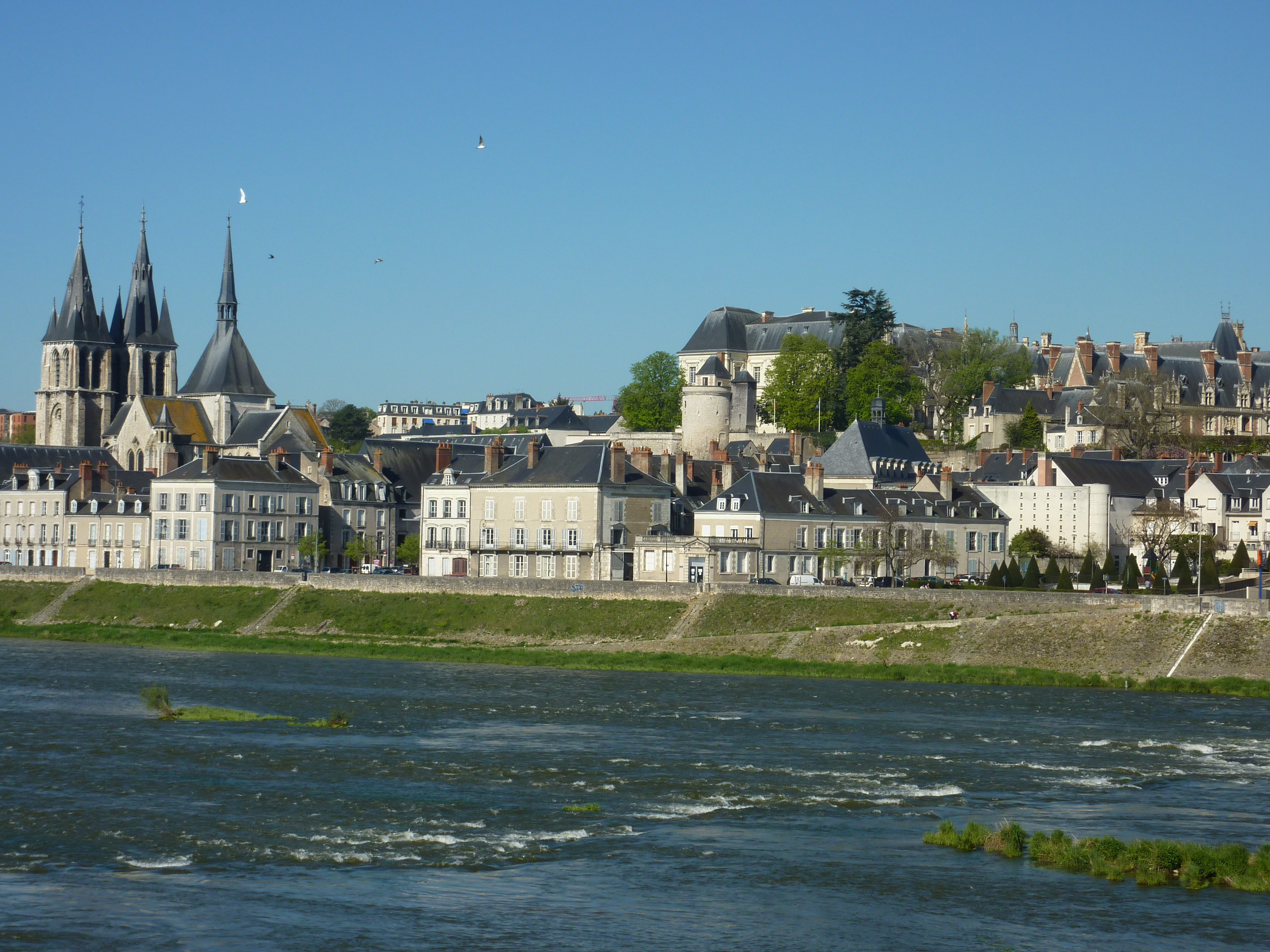
Blois, from the left bank of the Loire.

Bloisian (Blésois in French) is a natural region of France located around the city of Blois, Loir-et-Cher, Centre-Val de Loire. This term also refers to the locals living there. Historically, Bloisian was part of the County of Blois, and from 1498 part of the Orléanais province.

== Situation ==
This natural region is located in the center of the Loir-et-Cher department. With Val de Loire orléanais, Val de Loire tourangeau and Val d'Anjou, it is part of a larger natural region called Val de Loire.

Bloisian is between the following natural regions:

- In the North, Beauce and Val de Loire orléanais;
- In the East, Sologne;
- In the South, Val de Loire tourangeau;
- In the East, Gâtine tourangelle.

== Terminology ==
The word “Bloisian” comes from the city of Blois, whose name was firstly given by Romans to the surroundings as pagus Blesensi, and seems to derivate itself from the Celtic word bleiz, meaning “wolf”. As a result, Bloisian was originally the “land of wolves”, even though this animal disappeared in this region.

By analogy, this refers to a local dialect too.

The French term is “Blésois”, but the former “Blaisois” was once correct, but it has to be avoided since it can be confused with the Blaise river surroundings.

== Local wild fauna ==
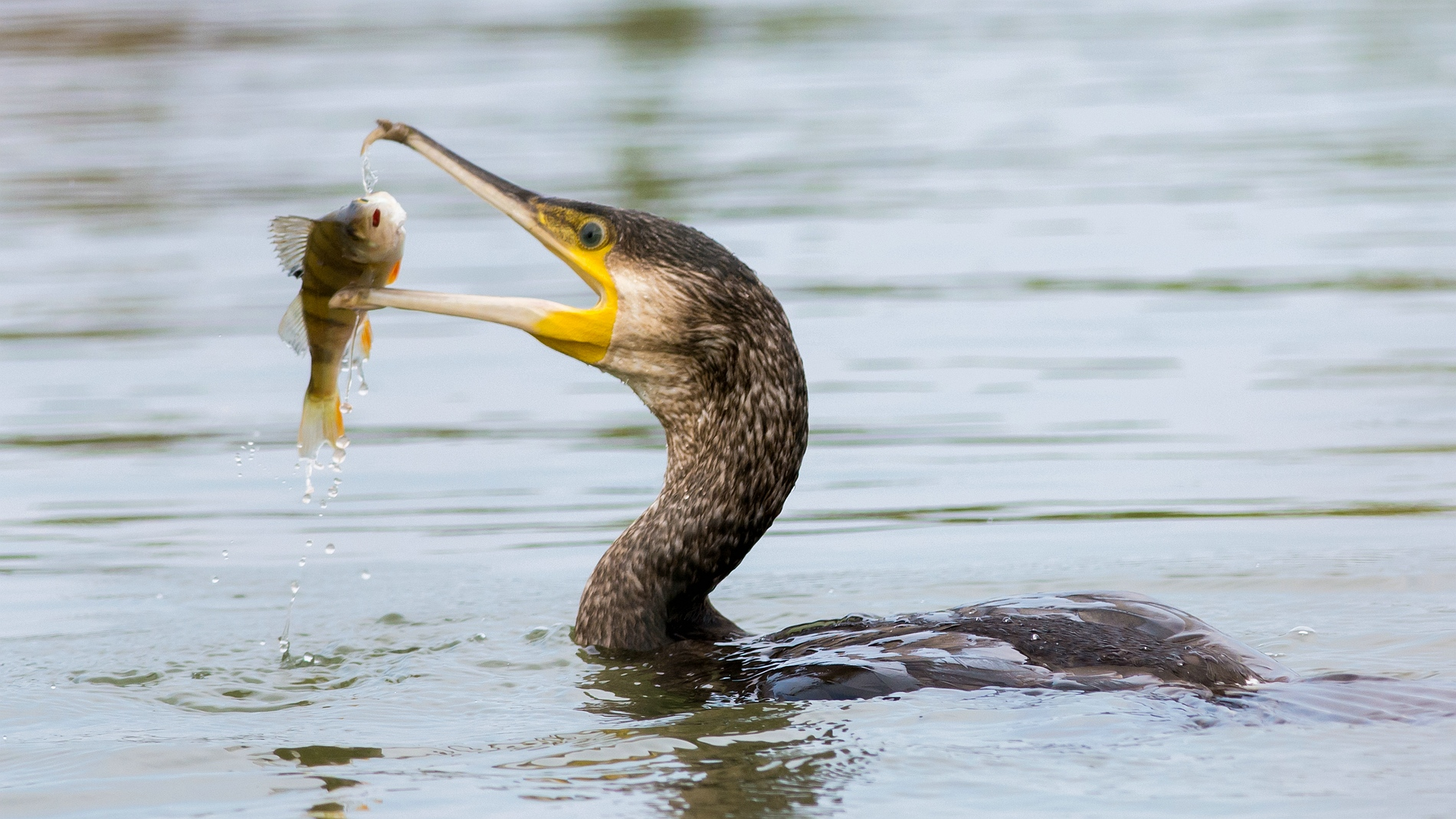
Great cormorant

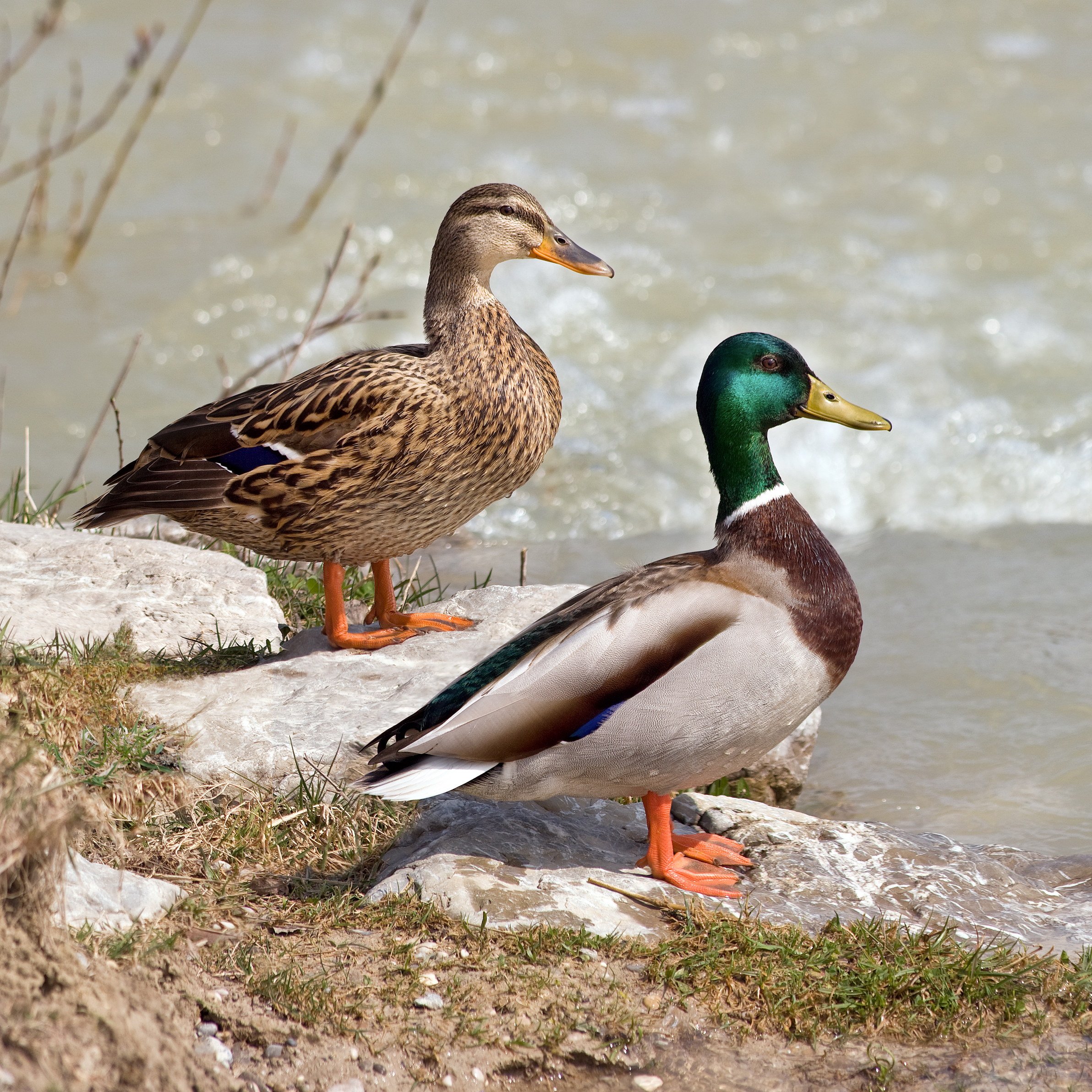
Couple of mallards

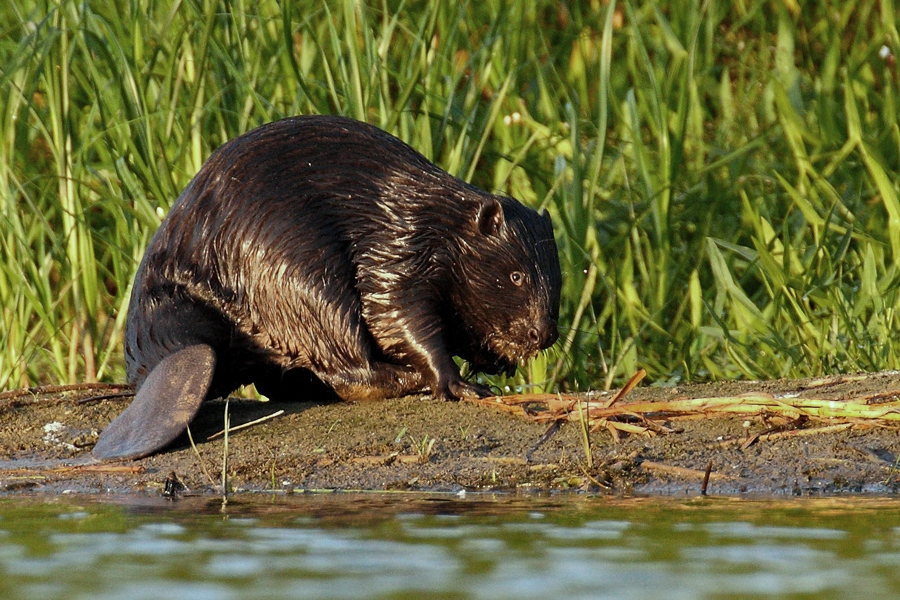
Eurasian beaver
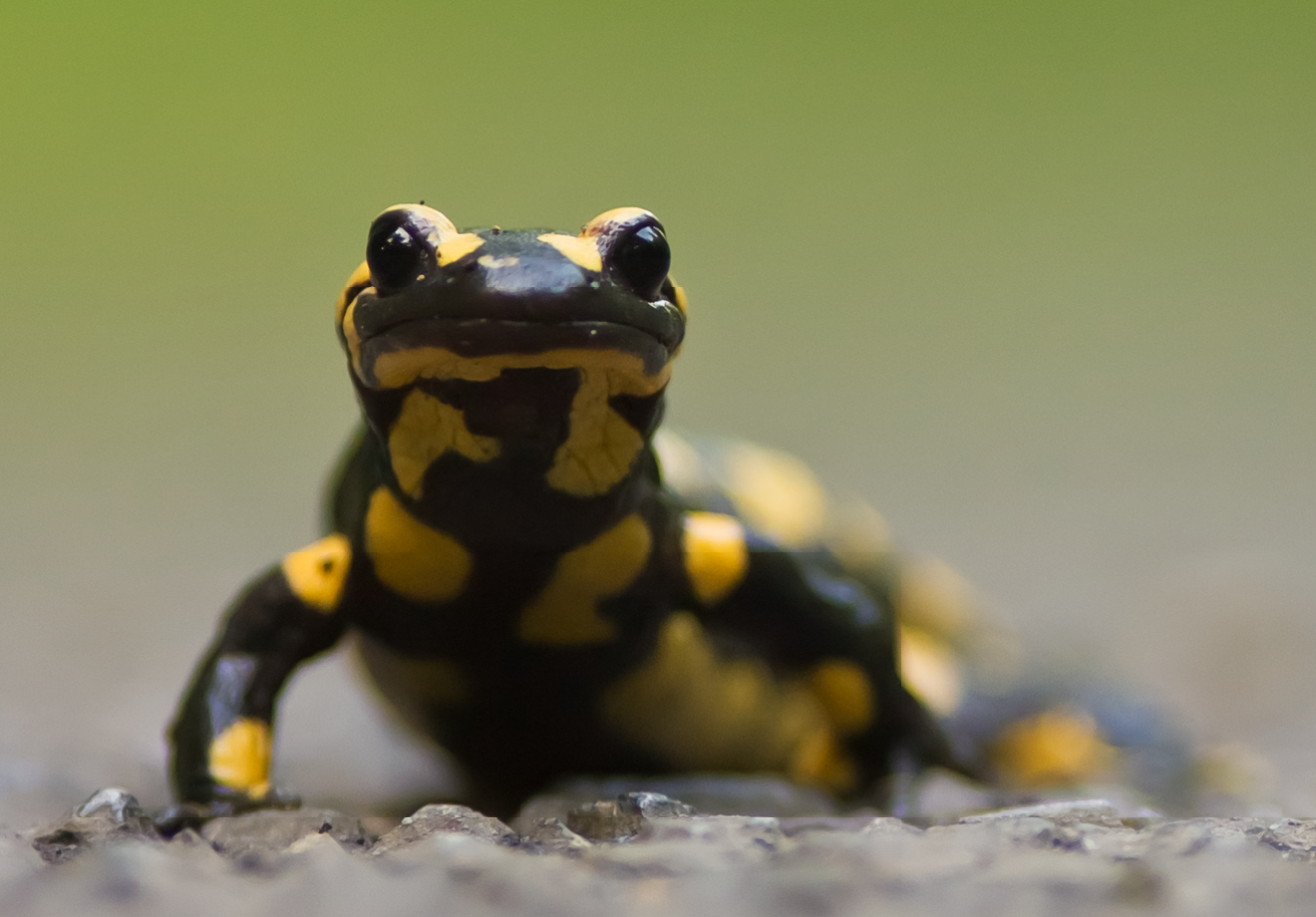
Fire salamander

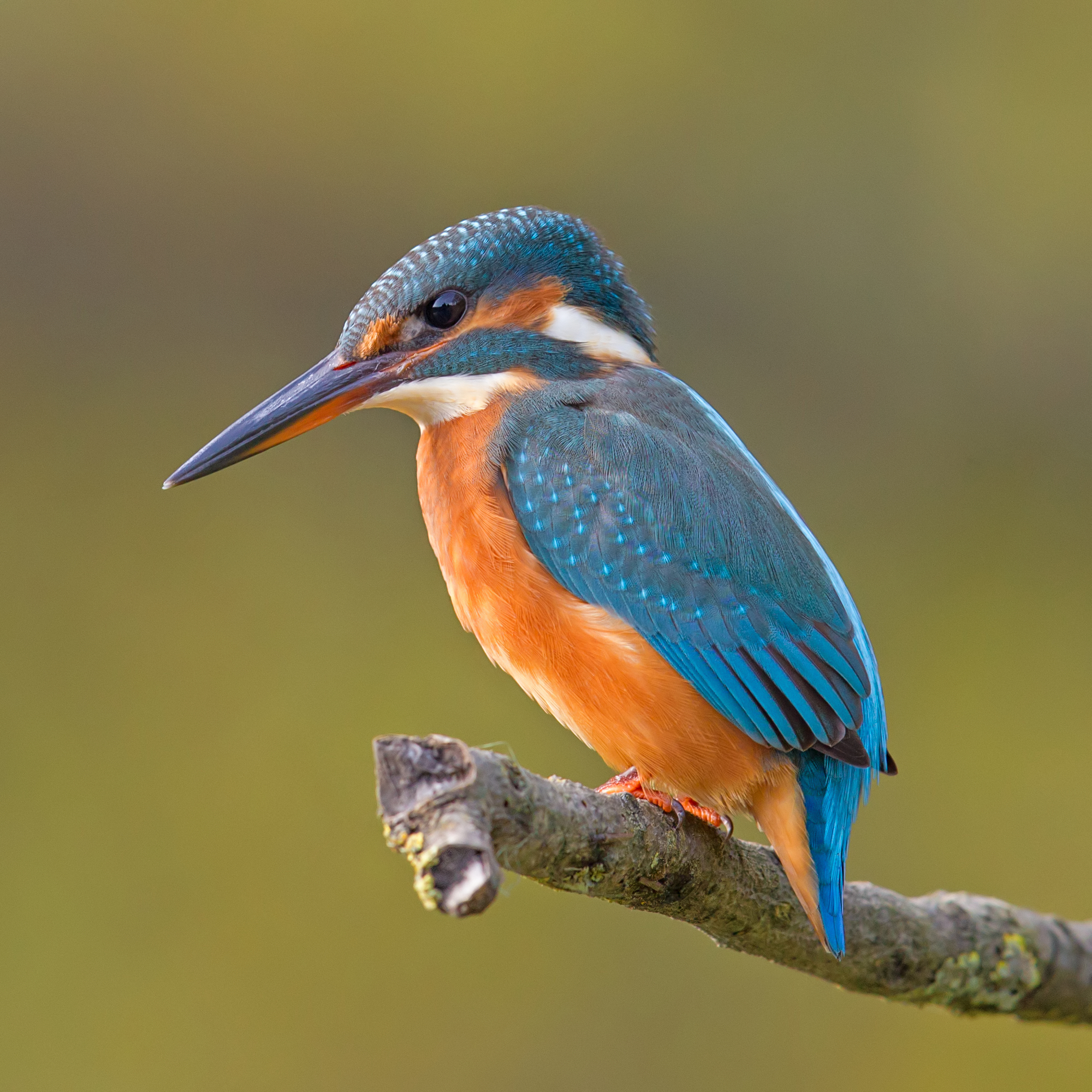
Eurasian kingfisher

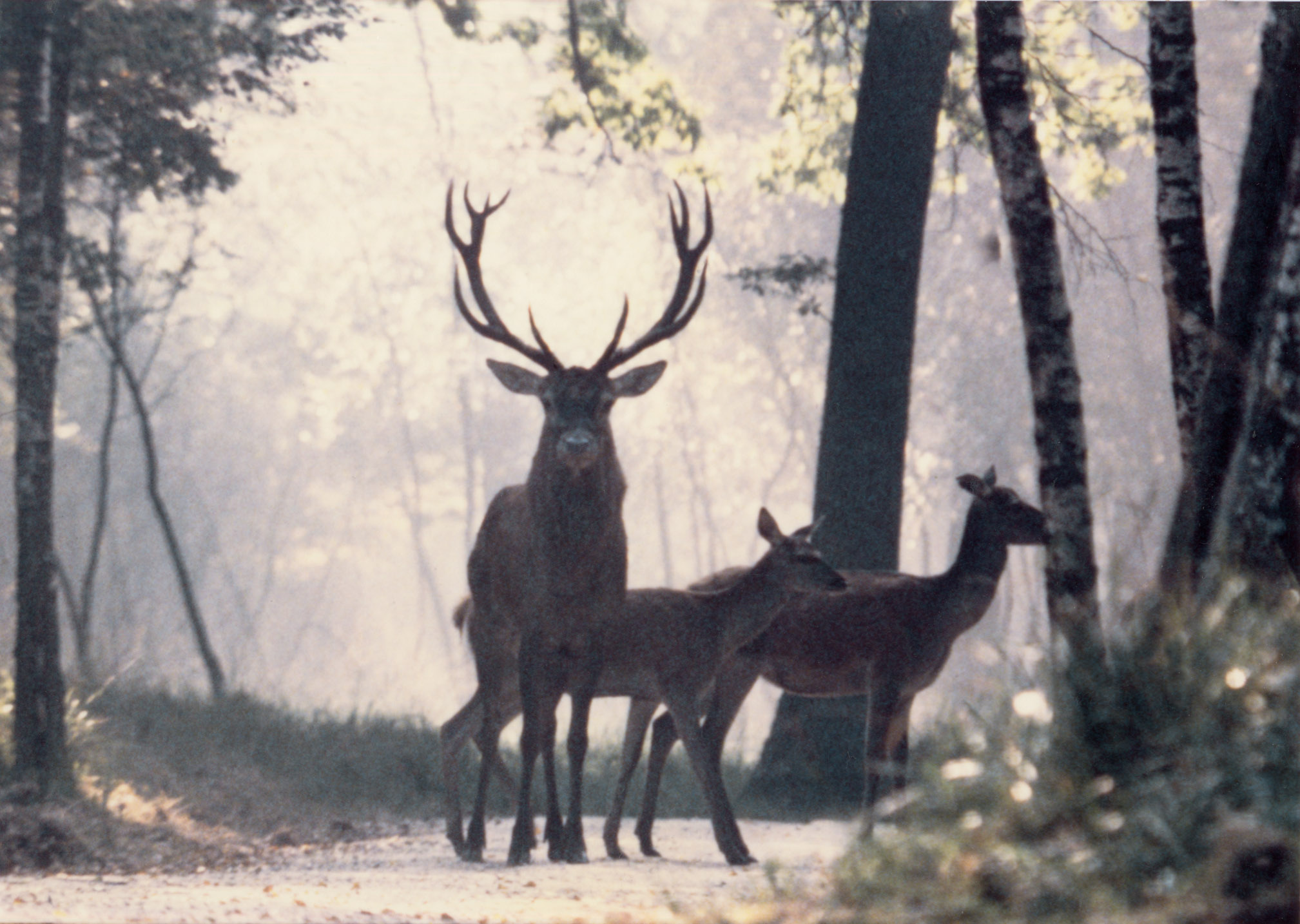
Red deer stag with 2 hinds

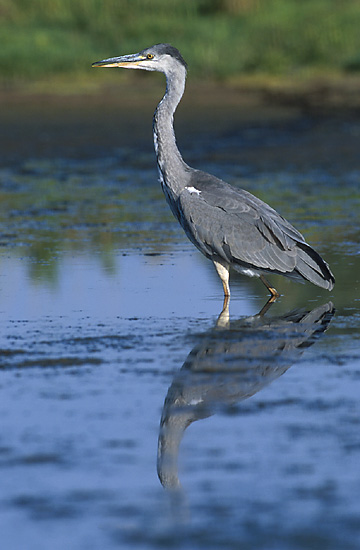
Grey heron
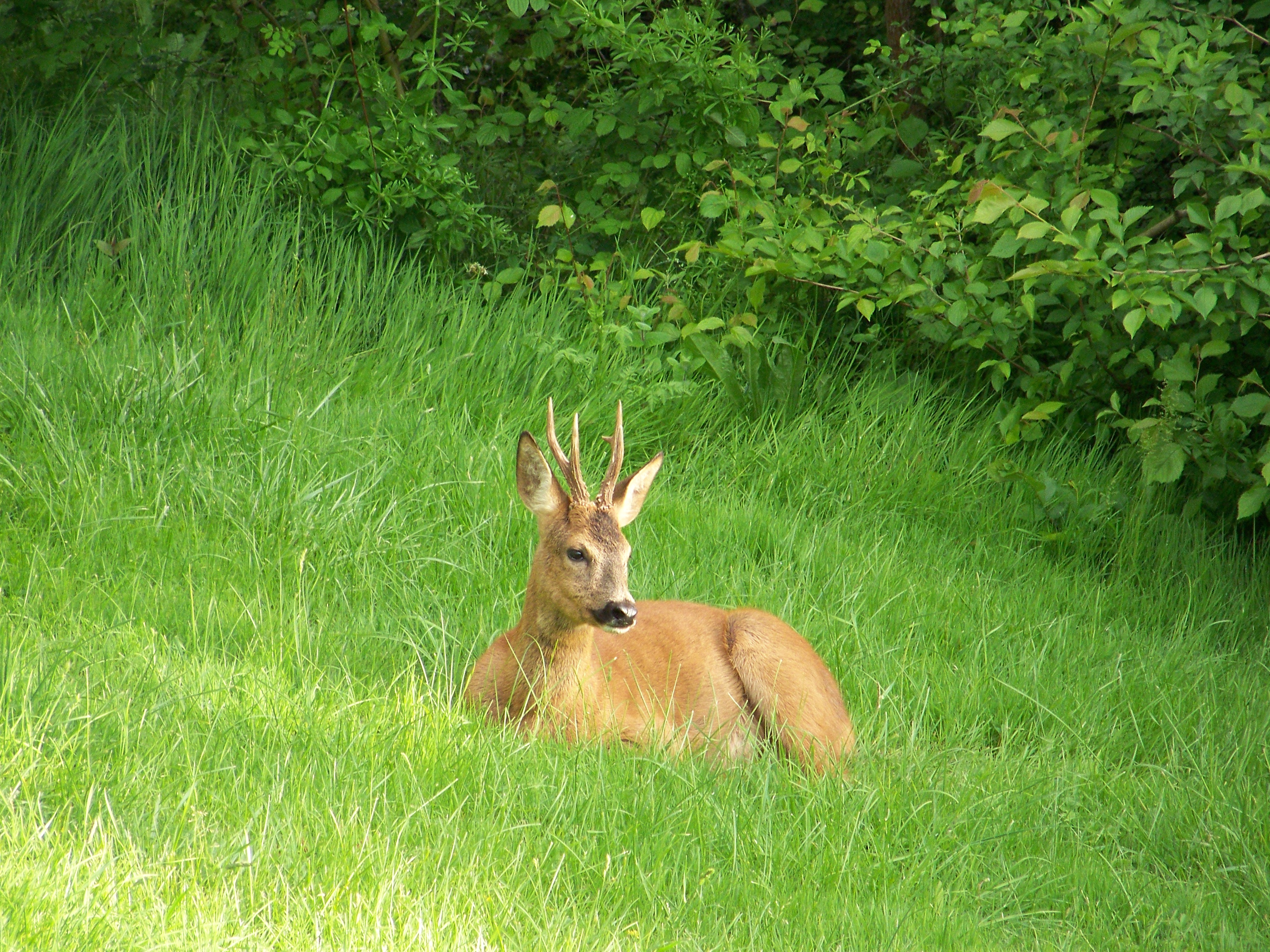
Roe deer

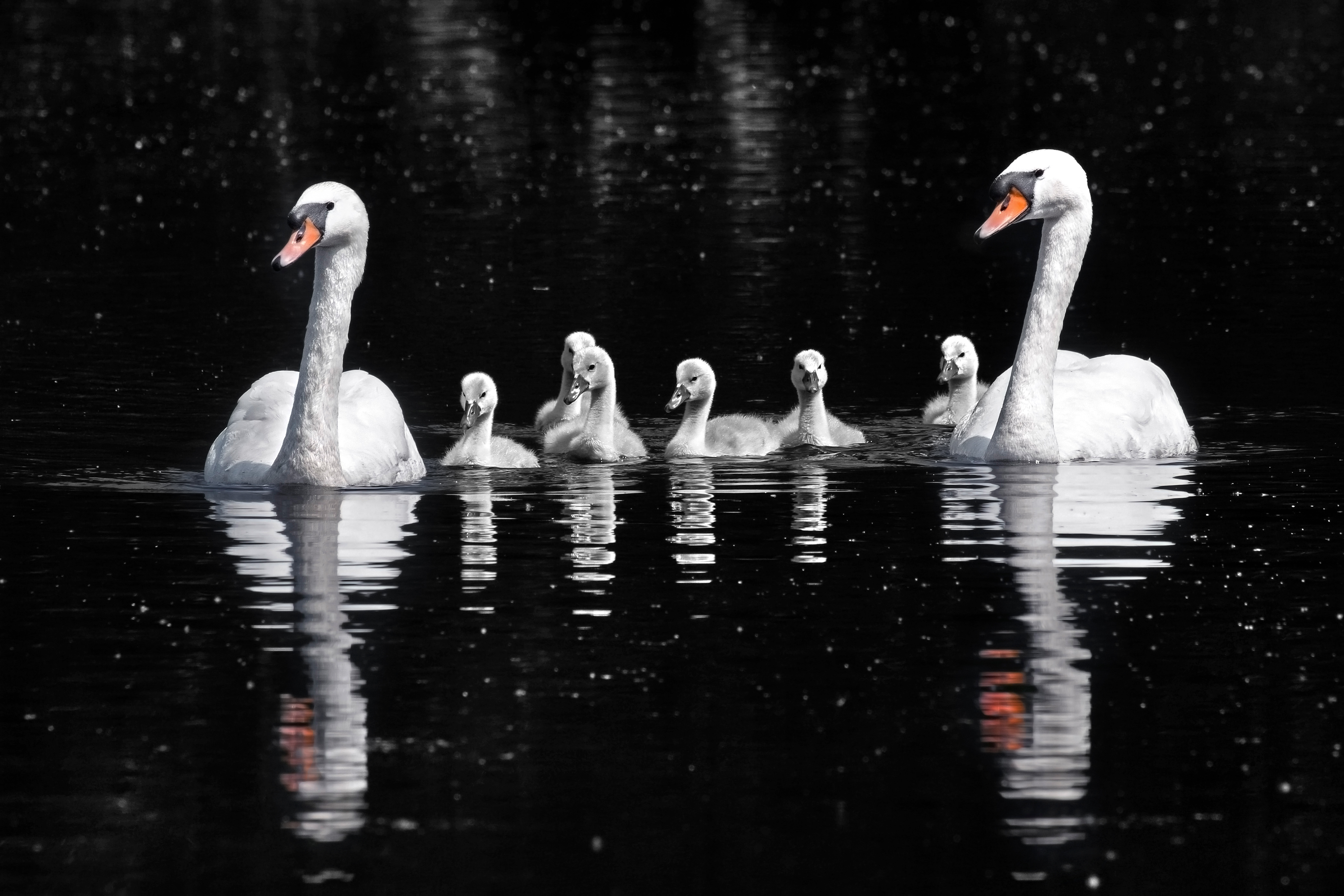
Family of mute swans

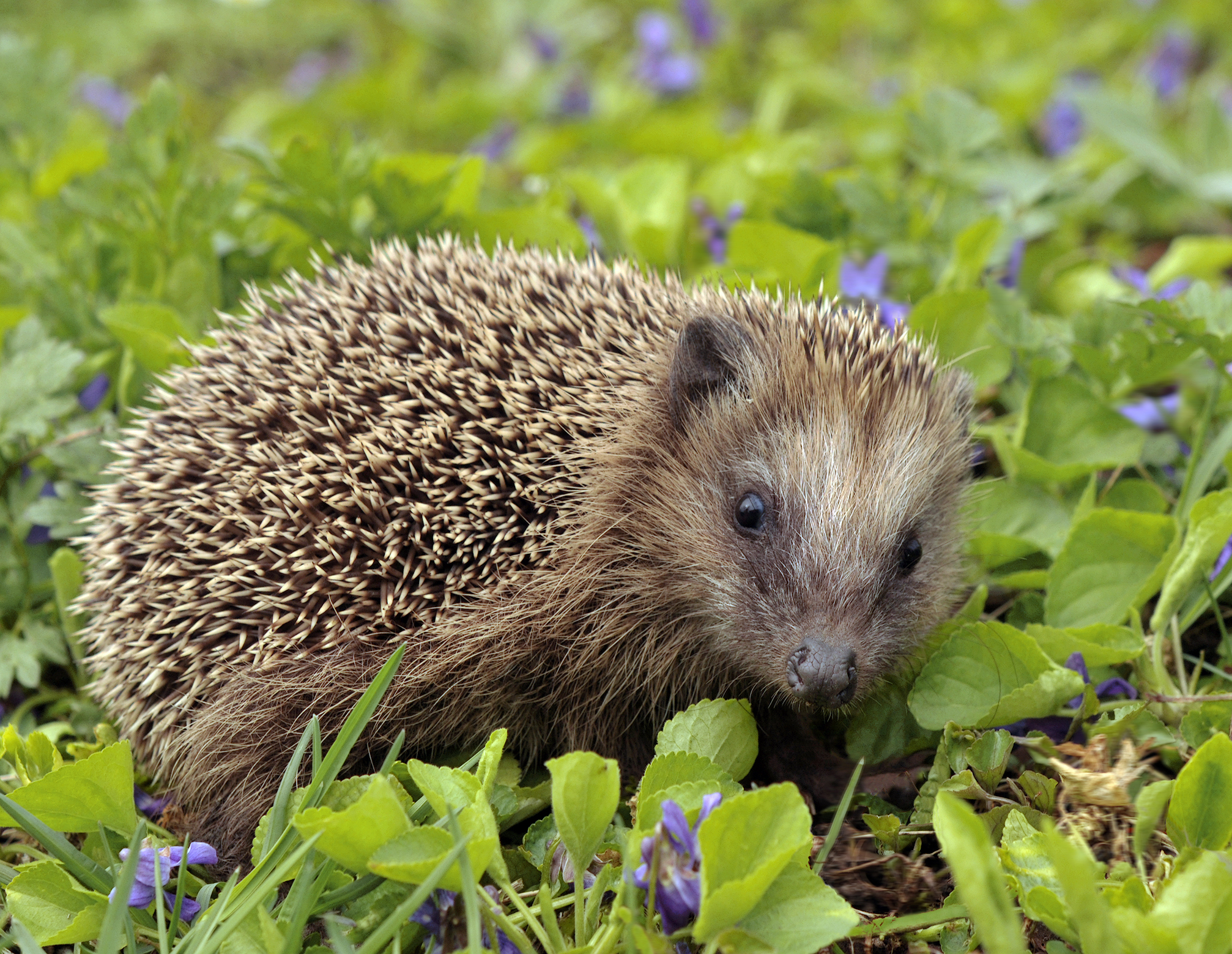
Young european hedgehog

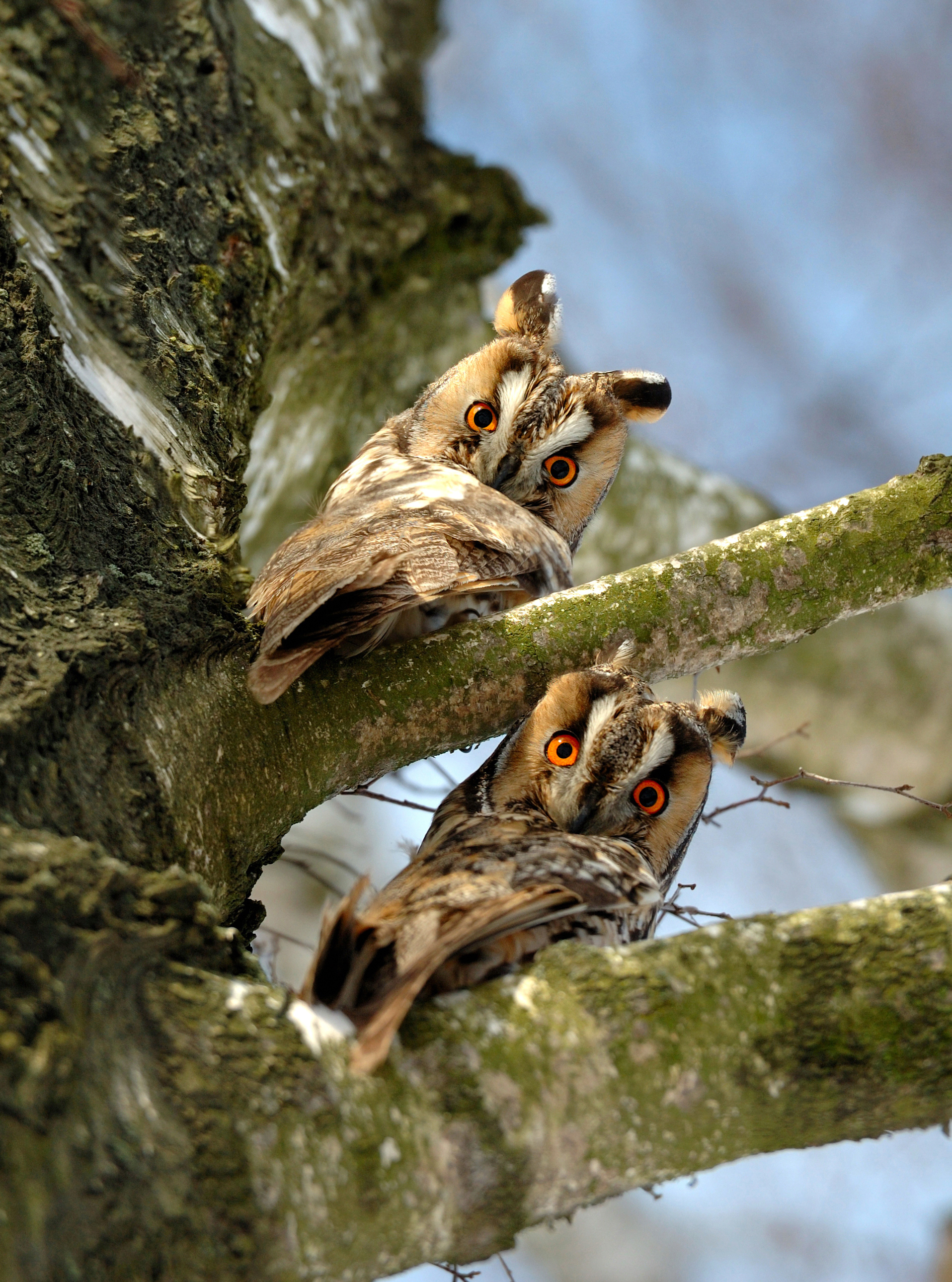
Duo of long-eared owls
