= Natural regions of France =

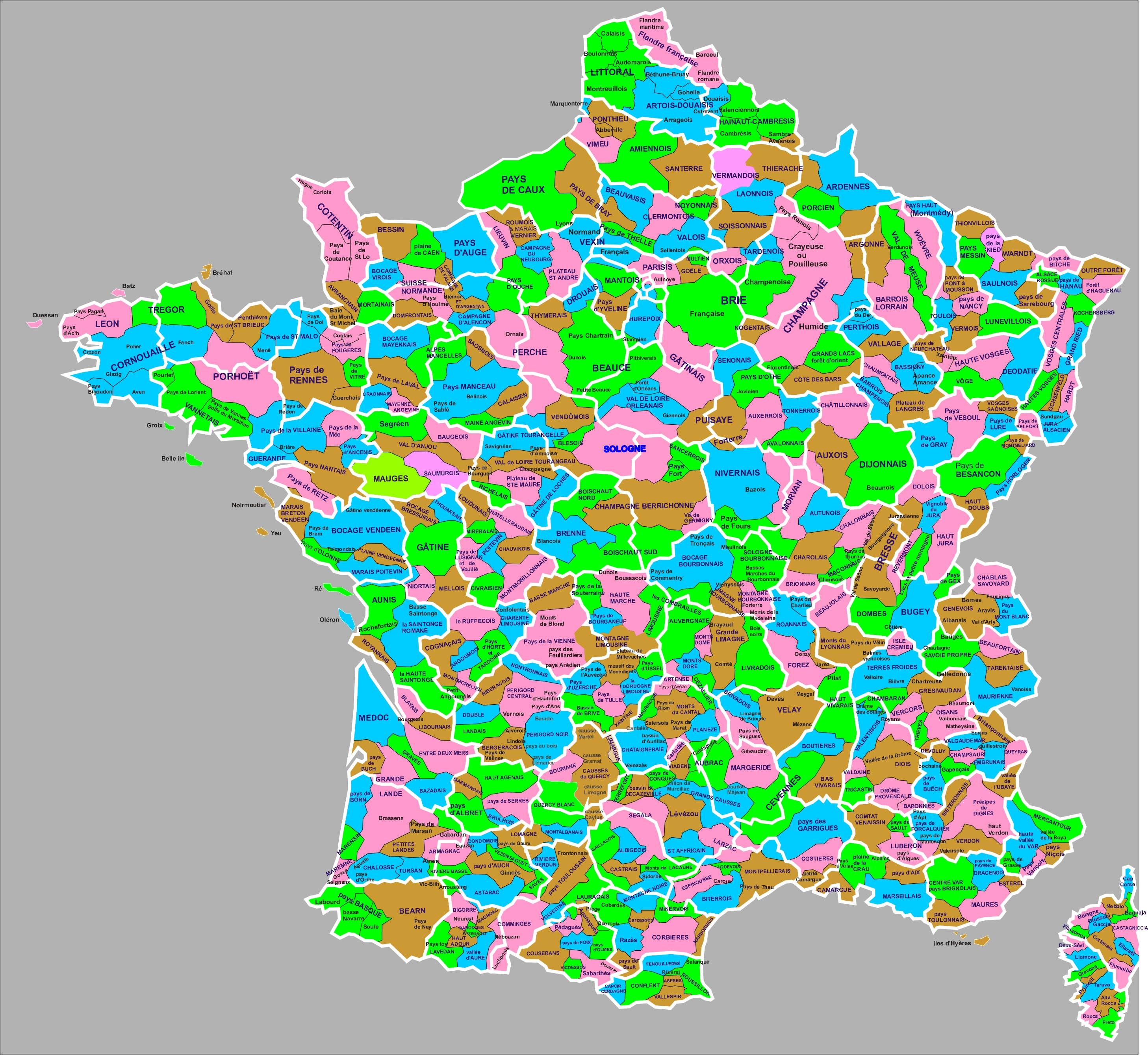
Map of natural regions of France

In France, a natural region (French: région naturelle), traditionally called "a country" (~“pais” in romance languages, who also gave the words “peasant” and “pagan” in english), is a territory of often limited extent (at most a few hundred square kilometers) with homogeneous physical characteristics (geomorphology, geology, climate, soils, water resources) associated with a human occupation that shares a distinct cultural identity (perception and management of land that develop specific landscapes). In some cases, traditional "pays" are subdivided into smaller territories; for example, the Bresse region is divided into Bresse bourguignonne (including Bresse louhannaise and Bresse chalonnaise), Bresse savoyarde, and Bresse comtoise. In Corsica, the term microrégion is used, with the island being divided into about fifteen such regions. The word "pays" derives from the Latin "pagus".

== History ==
Many natural regions in France have historically corresponded to political boundaries from the Middle Ages, inherited from the Gallo-Roman pagi, and sometimes, through them, the territory of a Gallic people or the influence of a city on its hinterland (such as Vendômois). The definition of a natural region may stem from the work of a local scholarly society, local scholars (for example, the Chinonais studied by the Amis du Vieux Chinon or the Lochois described in the works of local scholar Jacques-Marie Rougé and illustrated by the terroir museum in Loches), or ancient rural identities, particularly since the 16th century.

Over time, natural regions, conflated with the political power that administered them, may have given their names to much larger entities. This sometimes leads to confusion, as the same name often designates very different areas, sometimes unrelated to the original regions bearing that name (the natural region, its more or less enduring historical zone of influence, and its possible administrative forms). There are many examples:

- Artois (the country of Arras) and the County of Artois;
- The Pays de France and Île-de-France, which, like France itself, derive their names from Francia;
- Hainaut, originally limited to the valley of the Haine, now refers to historical entities and an administrative province (in Belgium);
- The Val de Loire, which includes part of the Centre-Val de Loire region, Mayenne, Sarthe, and Maine-et-Loire;
- The Pays Catalans in France includes the department of Pyrénées-Orientales (originally extending to Béziers).

== List of natural regions of France ==
Bénédicte and Jean-Jacques Fénié list 546 "pays" from Pays d'Ach to Pays d'Yveline. Frédéric Zégierman, on the other hand, identifies 426 with 1800 natural units. The relatively vague notion of traditional "pays" or natural regions limits the possibility of establishing a precise list. Different entities, each equally relevant but based on different criteria or perspectives, may overlap in the same geographic area.

- Bloisian
- Cévennes
- Landes de Gascogne
  - Landes forest
- Médoc
- Rivière-Basse
