= Méréville, Essonne =

Méréville
- Part of Le Mérévillois
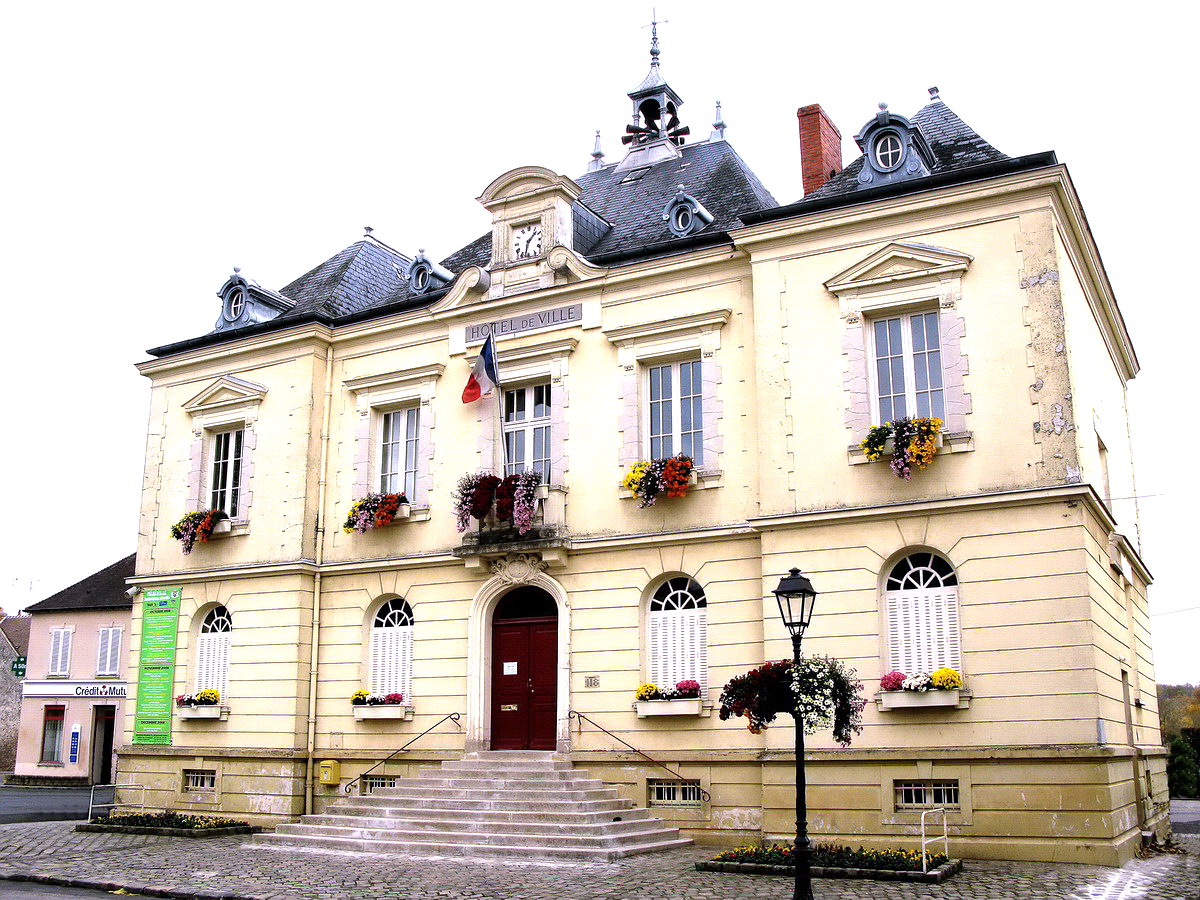
- The town hall in Méréville

- Coat of arms
- Location of Méréville
- Location within France Location within Île-de-France (region)
- Coordinates: 48°19′06″N 2°05′14″E
- Country: France
- Region: Île-de-France
- Department: Essonne
- Arrondissement: Étampes
- Canton: Étampes
- Commune: Le Mérévillois
- Area^{1}: 26.99 km^{2} (10.42 sq mi)
- Highest elevation: 142 m (466 ft)
- Lowest elevation: 82 m (269 ft)
- Population (2022): 3,163
  - Density: 117.2/km^{2} (303.5/sq mi)
- Time zone: UTC+01:00 (CET)
  - Summer (DST): UTC+02:00 (CEST)
- Postal code: 91660
- ^{1} French Land Register data, which excludes lakes, ponds, glaciers > 1 km^{2} (0.386 sq mi or 247 acres) and river estuaries.

Méréville is a former commune in the Essonne department in Île-de-France in northern France. On 1 January 2019, it was merged into the new commune Le Mérévillois. It contains the Château de Méréville, with its famous 1786 landscape park.

Inhabitants of Méréville are known as Mérévillois.

== Geography ==
The river Juine flows northward through the eastern part of the commune and crosses the village.

== See also ==
- Communes of the Essonne department
