= D'Huison-Longueville =

Commune in Île-de-France, France

- Commune
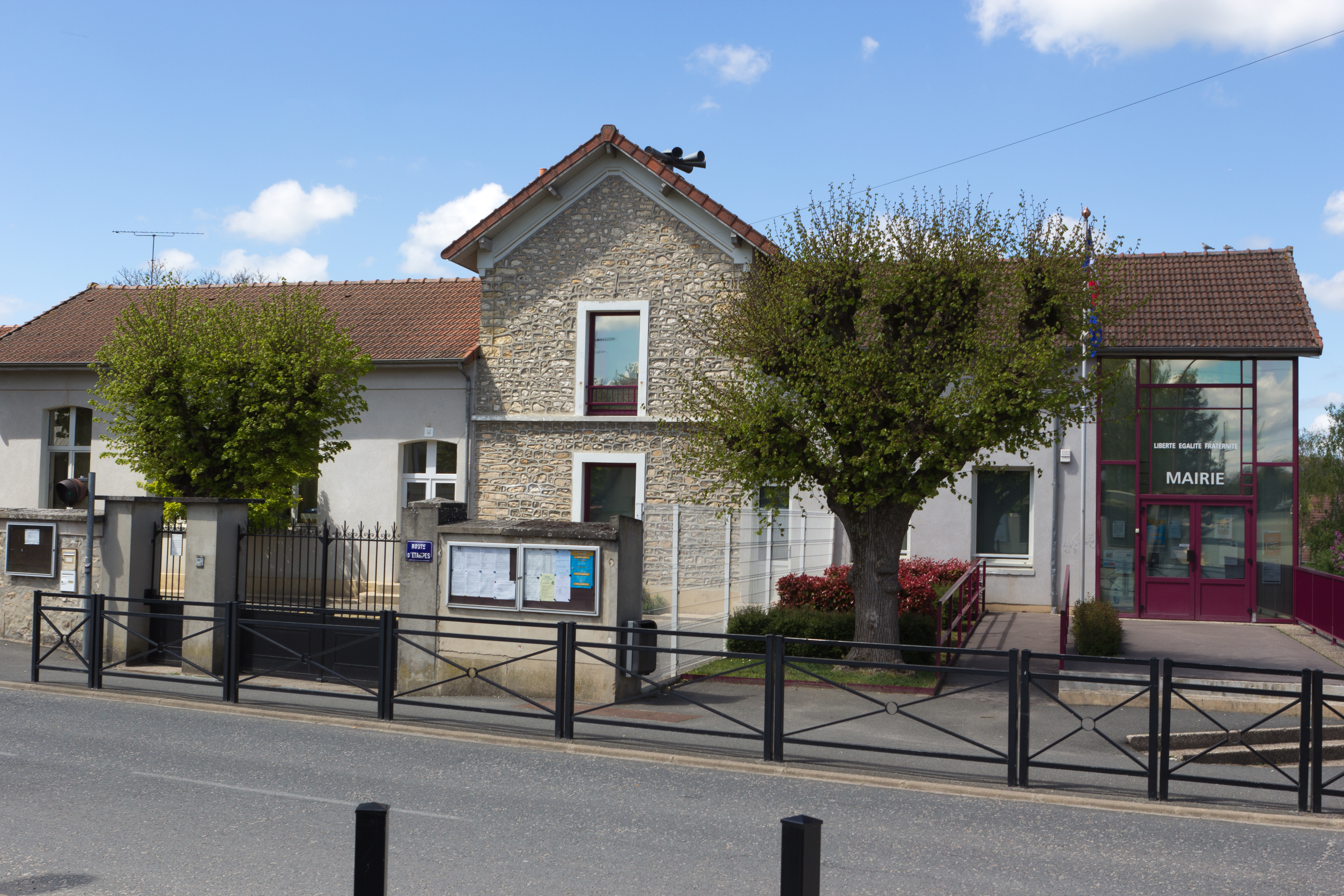
- The town hall of D'Huison-Longueville

- Coat of arms
- Location of D'Huison-Longueville
- Location within France Location within Île-de-France (region)
- Coordinates: 48°27′28″N 2°19′19″E
- Country: France
- Region: Île-de-France
- Department: Essonne
- Arrondissement: Étampes
- Canton: Étampes
- Intercommunality: Val d'Essonne

Government
  - Mayor (2020–2026): Jean-Christophe Hardy
- Area^{1}: 10.04 km^{2} (3.88 sq mi)
- Highest elevation: 145 m (476 ft)
- Lowest elevation: 53 m (174 ft)
- Population (2023): 1,557
  - Density: 155.1/km^{2} (401.7/sq mi)
- Time zone: UTC+01:00 (CET)
  - Summer (DST): UTC+02:00 (CEST)
- INSEE/Postal code: 91198 /91590
- ^{1} French Land Register data, which excludes lakes, ponds, glaciers > 1 km^{2} (0.386 sq mi or 247 acres) and river estuaries.

D'Huison-Longueville (French pronunciation: [dɥizɔ̃ lɔ̃ɡvil]) is a commune in the Essonne department in Île-de-France in northern France.

== Population ==
Inhabitants of D'Huison-Longueville are known as Huisonnais-Longuevillois in French.

Historical population
Year	Pop.	±% p.a.
1968	425	—
1975	684	+7.03%
1982	857	+3.27%
1990	1,168	+3.95%
1999	1,232	+0.59%
2007	1,327	+0.93%
2012	1,438	+1.62%
2017	1,508	+0.96%
2023	1,557	+0.53%
Source: INSEE

== See also ==
- Communes of the Essonne department
