= Montespan =

- Commune
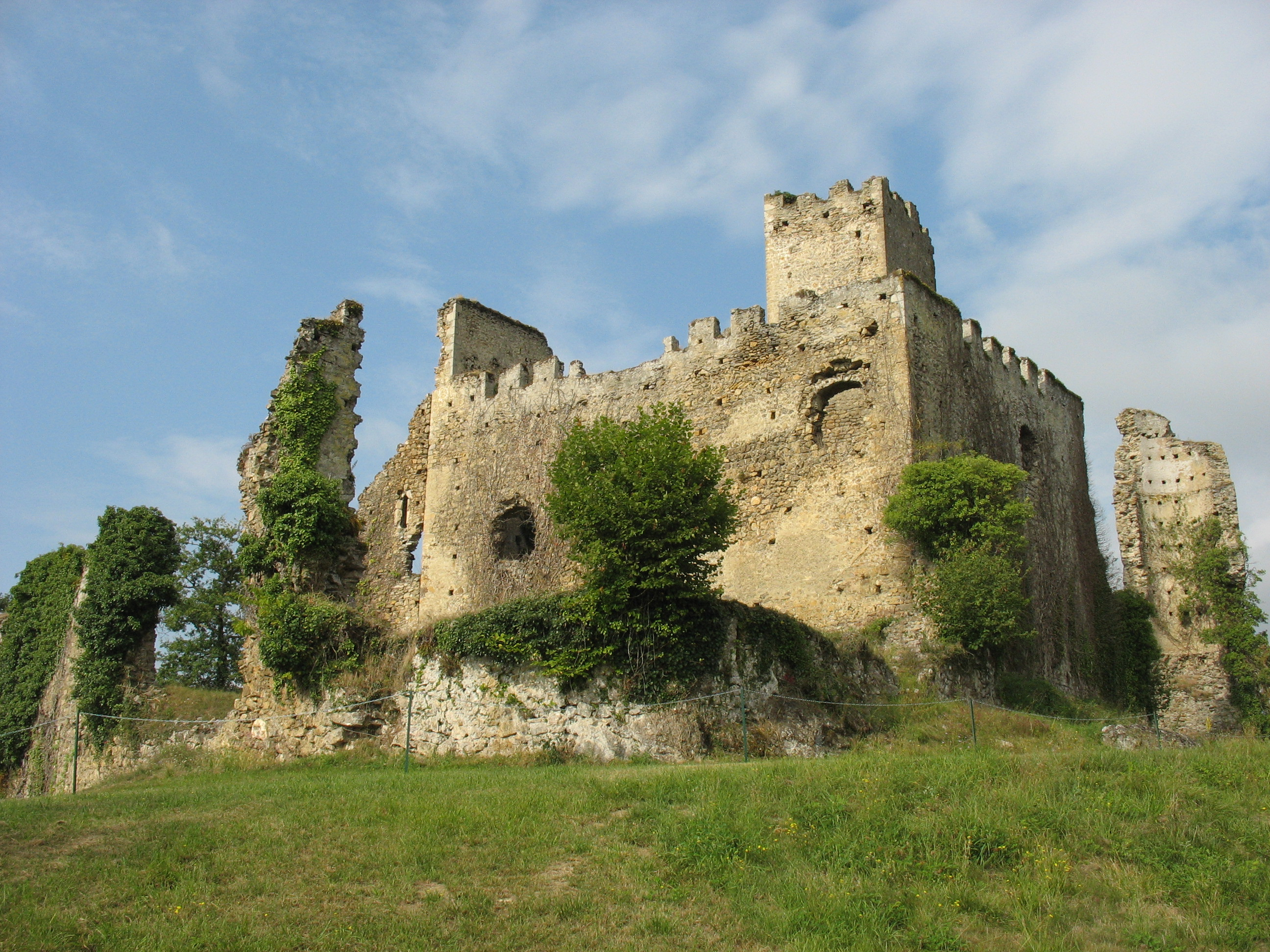
- The chateau ruins in Montespan

- Coat of arms
- Location of Montespan
- Location within France Location within Occitanie
- Coordinates: 43°05′09″N 0°51′18″E
- Country: France
- Region: Occitania
- Department: Haute-Garonne
- Arrondissement: Saint-Gaudens
- Canton: Bagnères-de-Luchon
- Intercommunality: Cagire Garonne Salat

Government
  - Mayor (2020–2026): Marie-Christine Llorens
- Area^{1}: 12.57 km^{2} (4.85 sq mi)
- Elevation: 400 m (1,300 ft)
- Highest elevation: 522 m (1,713 ft)
- Lowest elevation: 298 m (978 ft)
- Population (2023): 476
  - Density: 37.9/km^{2} (98.1/sq mi)
- Time zone: UTC+01:00 (CET)
  - Summer (DST): UTC+02:00 (CEST)
- INSEE/Postal code: 31372 /31260
- ^{1} French Land Register data, which excludes lakes, ponds, glaciers > 1 km^{2} (0.386 sq mi or 247 acres) and river estuaries.

Montespan (French pronunciation: [mɔ̃tɛspɑ̃]; Occitan: [mũnteˈspa]) is a commune in the Haute-Garonne department of southwestern France.

== Population ==
Historical population
Year	Pop.	±% p.a.
1968	479	—
1975	432	−1.46%
1982	428	−0.13%
1990	398	−0.90%
1999	422	+0.65%
2007	435	+0.38%
2012	444	+0.41%
2017	455	+0.49%
2023	476	+0.75%
Source: INSEE

== Sights ==
The remains of a 13th-century castle, the Château de Montespan, have been listed since 1926 as a historic site by the French Ministry of Culture.

== See also ==
- Communes of the Haute-Garonne department
