= Orveau =

Commune in Île-de-France, France

- Commune
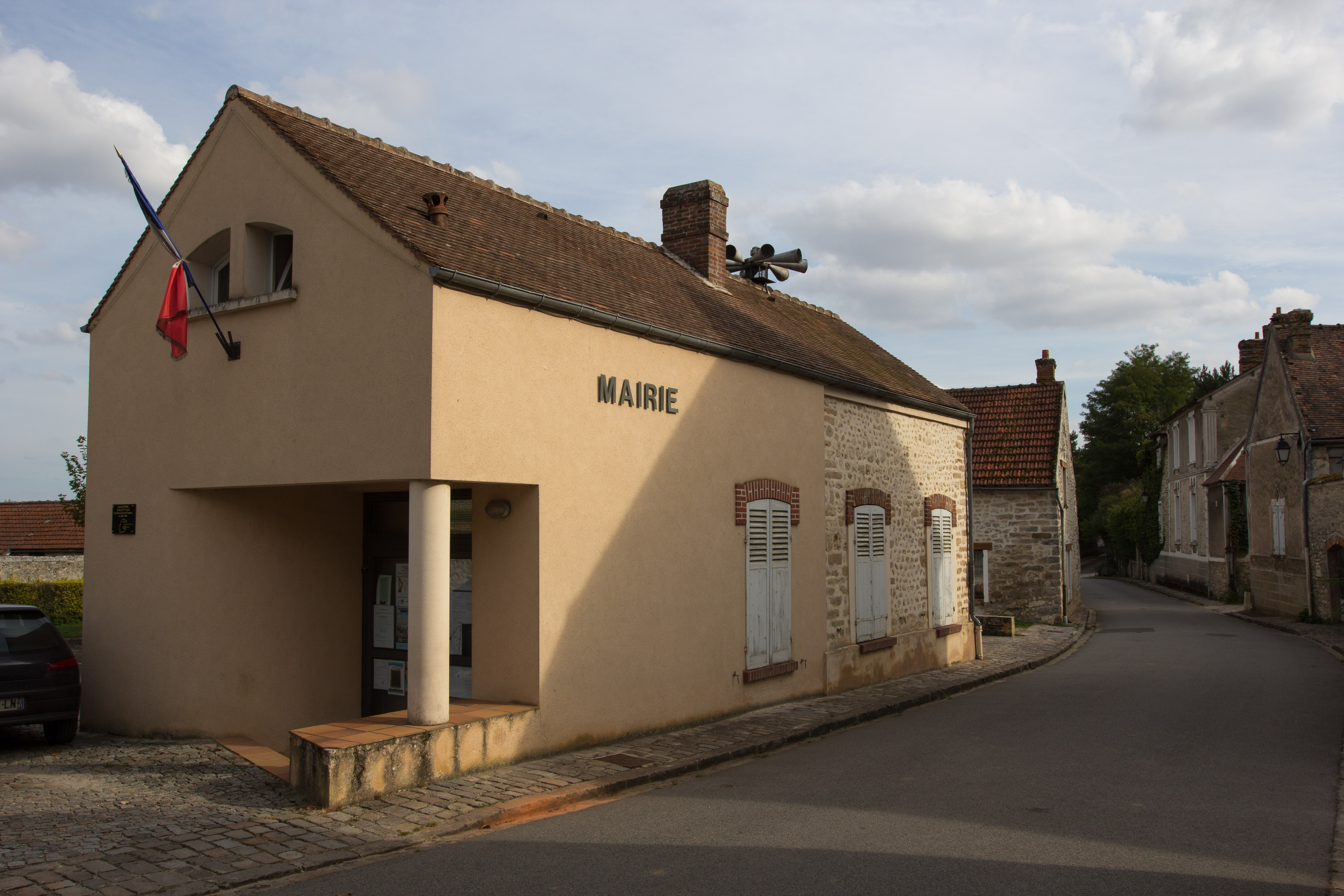
- The town hall in Orveau
- Location of Orveau
- Location within France Location within Île-de-France (region)
- Coordinates: 48°26′54″N 2°17′32″E
- Country: France
- Region: Île-de-France
- Department: Essonne
- Arrondissement: Étampes
- Canton: Étampes

Government
  - Mayor (2020–2026): Philippe Damiot
- Area^{1}: 4.30 km^{2} (1.66 sq mi)
- Highest elevation: 147 m (482 ft)
- Lowest elevation: 64 m (210 ft)
- Population (2023): 141
  - Density: 32.8/km^{2} (84.9/sq mi)
- Time zone: UTC+01:00 (CET)
  - Summer (DST): UTC+02:00 (CEST)
- INSEE/Postal code: 91473 /91590
- ^{1} French Land Register data, which excludes lakes, ponds, glaciers > 1 km^{2} (0.386 sq mi or 247 acres) and river estuaries.

Orveau (French pronunciation: [ɔʁvo]) is a commune in the Essonne department in Île-de-France in northern France.

Inhabitants of Orveau are known as Orvallois.

== See also ==
- Communes of the Essonne department
