= Boissy-le-Cutté =

Commune in Île-de-France, France

- Commune
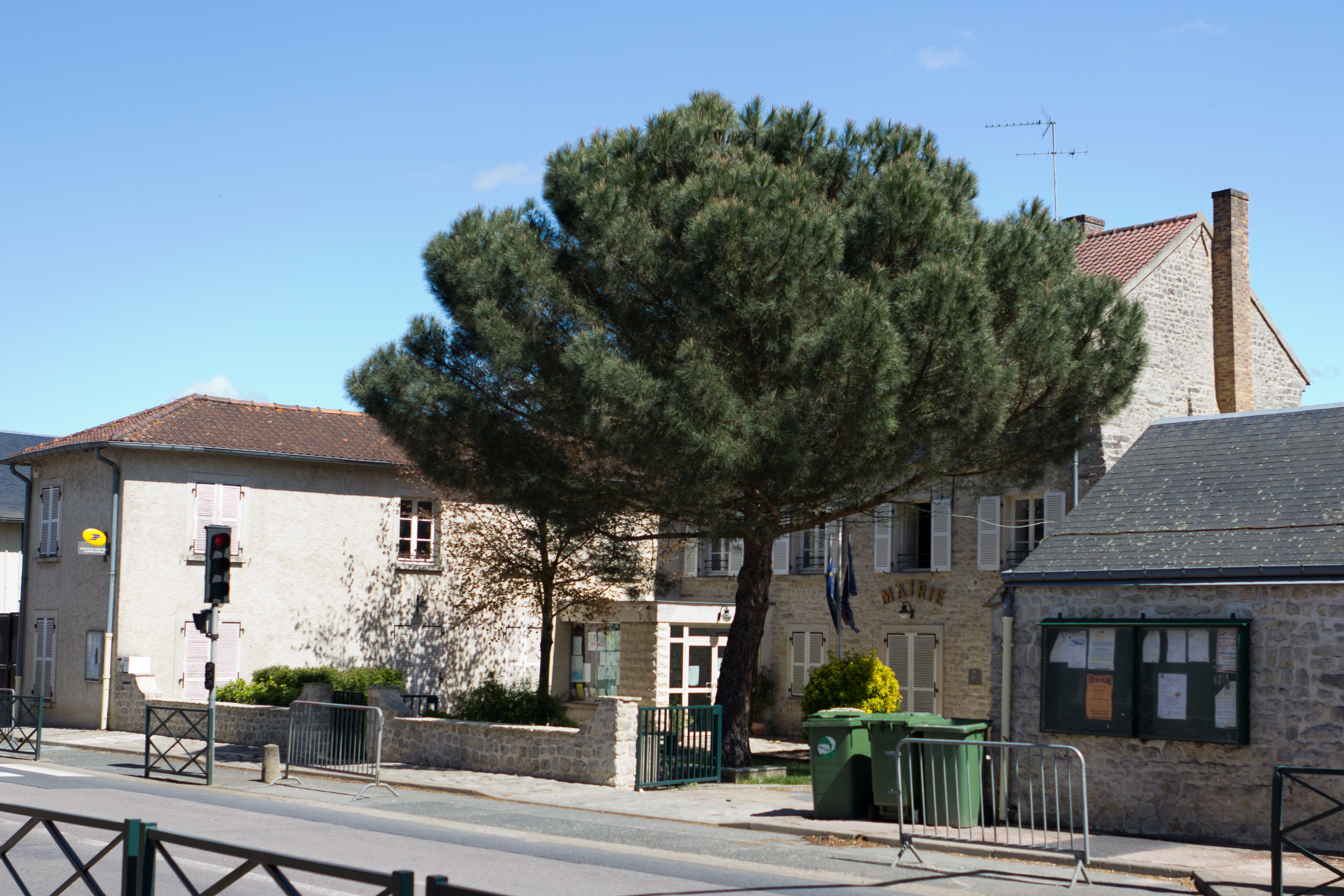
- The town hall of Boissy-le-Cutté

- Coat of arms
- Location of Boissy-le-Cutté
- Location within France Location within Île-de-France (region)
- Coordinates: 48°28′09″N 2°16′57″E
- Country: France
- Region: Île-de-France
- Department: Essonne
- Arrondissement: Étampes
- Canton: Étampes
- Intercommunality: Entre Juine et Renarde

Government
  - Mayor (2020–2026): Sylvie Sechet
- Area^{1}: 4.58 km^{2} (1.77 sq mi)
- Highest elevation: 148 m (486 ft)
- Lowest elevation: 72 m (236 ft)
- Population (2023): 1,331
  - Density: 291/km^{2} (753/sq mi)
- Time zone: UTC+01:00 (CET)
  - Summer (DST): UTC+02:00 (CEST)
- INSEE/Postal code: 91080 /91590
- ^{1} French Land Register data, which excludes lakes, ponds, glaciers > 1 km^{2} (0.386 sq mi or 247 acres) and river estuaries.

Boissy-le-Cutté (French pronunciation: [bwasi lə kyte]) is a commune in the Essonne department in Île-de-France in northern France.

Inhabitants of Boissy-le-Cutté are known as Boissillons in French.

== See also ==
- Communes of the Essonne department
