= Estouches =

- Part of Le Mérévillois
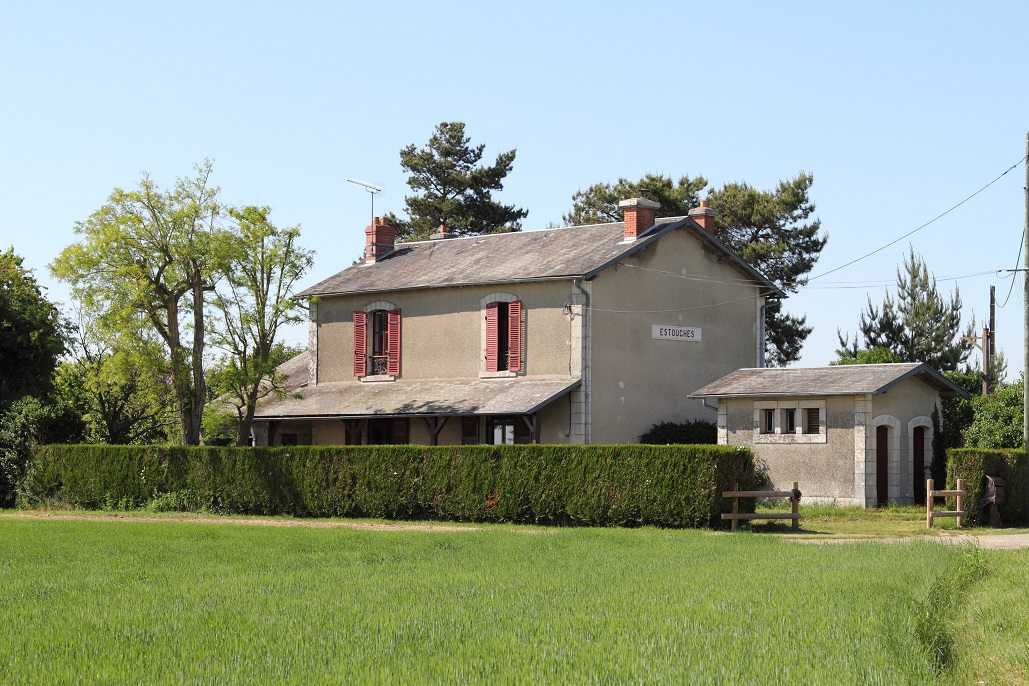
- The former railway station in Estouches
- Location of Estouches
- Location within France Location within Île-de-France (region)
- Coordinates: 48°18′08″N 2°08′02″E
- Country: France
- Region: Île-de-France
- Department: Essonne
- Arrondissement: Étampes
- Canton: Étampes
- Commune: Le Mérévillois
- Area^{1}: 5.98 km^{2} (2.31 sq mi)
- Highest elevation: 138 m (453 ft)
- Lowest elevation: 124 m (407 ft)
- Population (2022): 257
  - Density: 43.0/km^{2} (111/sq mi)
- Time zone: UTC+01:00 (CET)
  - Summer (DST): UTC+02:00 (CEST)
- Postal code: 91660
- ^{1} French Land Register data, which excludes lakes, ponds, glaciers > 1 km^{2} (0.386 sq mi or 247 acres) and river estuaries.

Estouches (French pronunciation: [ɛstuʃ]) is a former commune in the Essonne department in Île-de-France in northern France. On 1 January 2019, it was merged into the new commune Le Mérévillois.

Inhabitants of Estouches are known as Estornaciens.

== See also ==
- Communes of the Essonne department
