= Auvers-Saint-Georges =

Commune in Île-de-France, France

- Commune
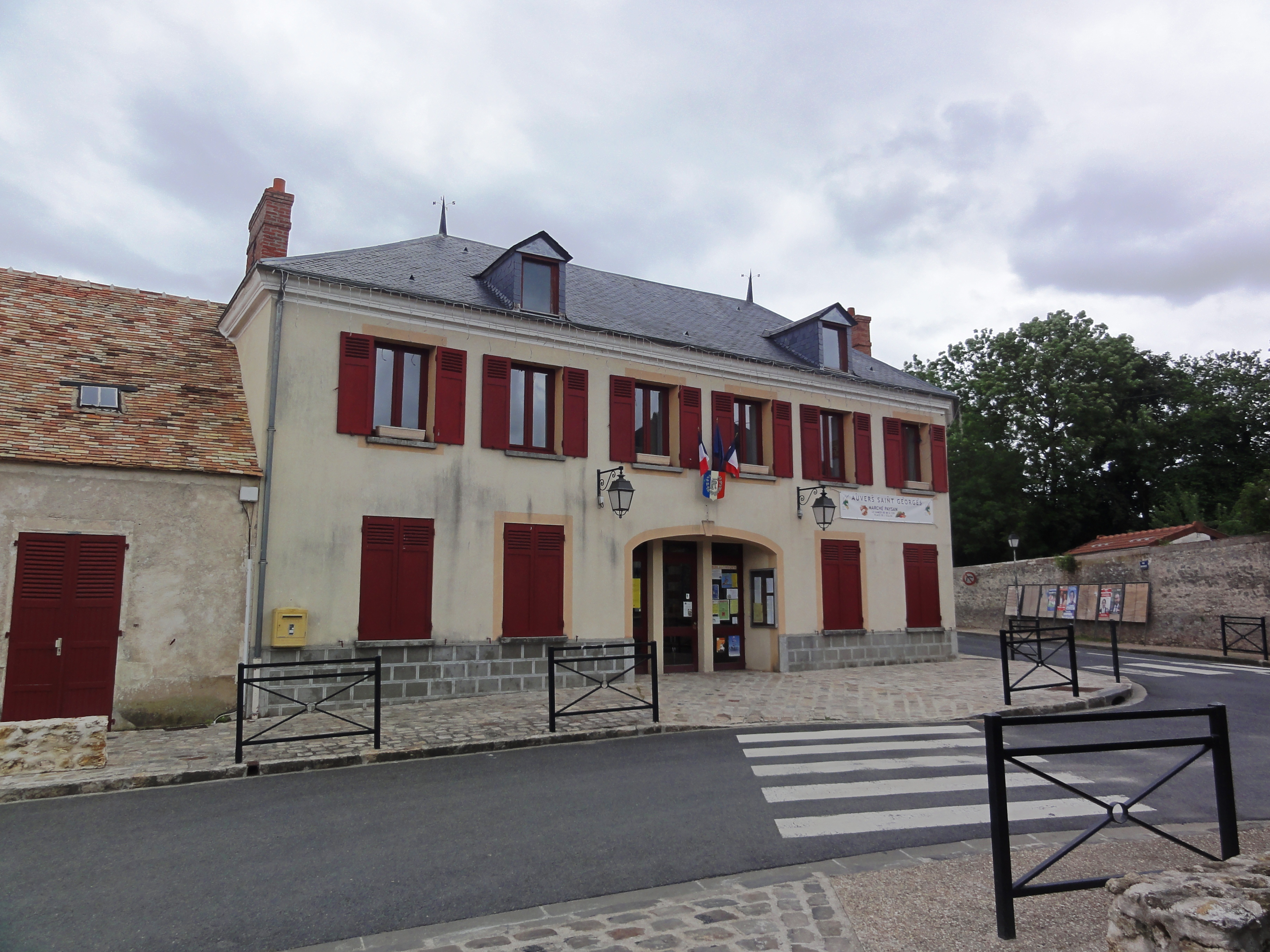
- The town hall of Auvers-Saint-Georges
- Location of Auvers-Saint-Georges
- Location within France Location within Île-de-France (region)
- Coordinates: 48°29′33″N 2°13′07″E
- Country: France
- Region: Île-de-France
- Department: Essonne
- Arrondissement: Étampes
- Canton: Étampes
- Intercommunality: CC Entre Juine Renarde

Government
  - Mayor (2020–2026): Denis Meunier
- Area^{1}: 12.99 km^{2} (5.02 sq mi)
- Highest elevation: 156 m (512 ft)
- Lowest elevation: 63 m (207 ft)
- Population (2023): 1,223
  - Density: 94.15/km^{2} (243.8/sq mi)
- Time zone: UTC+01:00 (CET)
  - Summer (DST): UTC+02:00 (CEST)
- INSEE/Postal code: 91038 /91580
- ^{1} French Land Register data, which excludes lakes, ponds, glaciers > 1 km^{2} (0.386 sq mi or 247 acres) and river estuaries.

Auvers-Saint-Georges (French pronunciation: [ovɛʁ sɛ̃ ʒɔʁʒ]) is a commune in the Essonne department in Île-de-France in northern France.

Inhabitants are known as Auversois.

== Geography ==
The village lies on the right bank of the Juine, which forms all of the commune's north-western border.

== See also ==
- Communes of the Essonne department
