= Haute Vallée de Chevreuse Regional Natural Park =

- IUCN category V (protected landscape/seascape)
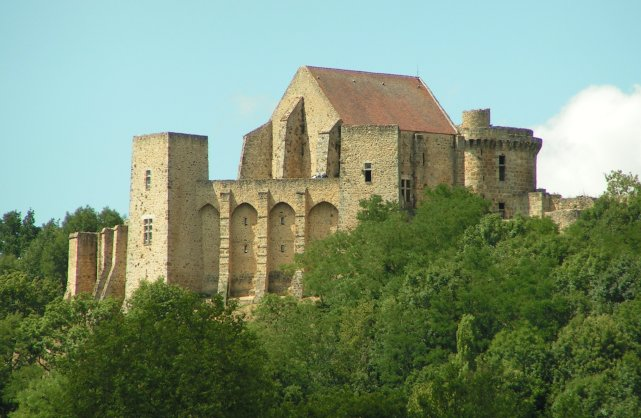
- Château de la Madeleine, Chevreuse
- Interactive map of Haute Vallée de Chevreuse Regional Natural Park
- Location: Île-de-France, Yvelines; Essonne, France
- Coordinates: 48.661°N 1.964°E
- Area: 256 km^{2} (99 sq mi)
- Established: 1985
- Governing body: Fédération des parcs naturels régionaux de France
- Website: www.parc-naturel-chevreuse.fr/

Haute Vallée de Chevreuse Regional Natural Park (French: Parc naturel régional de la haute vallée de Chevreuse, pronounced [paʁk natyʁɛl ʁeʒjɔnal də la ot vale də ʃəvʁøz]) is a protected area in the Île-de-France region of northern France. It is a verdant rural area outside Paris, designated as a regional natural park because it contains a wide variety of unique historical sites.

== Features ==
The parkland spans two departments, Yvelines and Essonne, and connects fifty-one separate communes along the Chevreuse valley of the river Yvette. The park's main office is located in Chevreuse in a medieval fortress, the Château de la Madeleine.

The land was officially designated as a parc naturel régional (PNR) in 1985, with a total area of 25,600 hectares (63,000 acres).

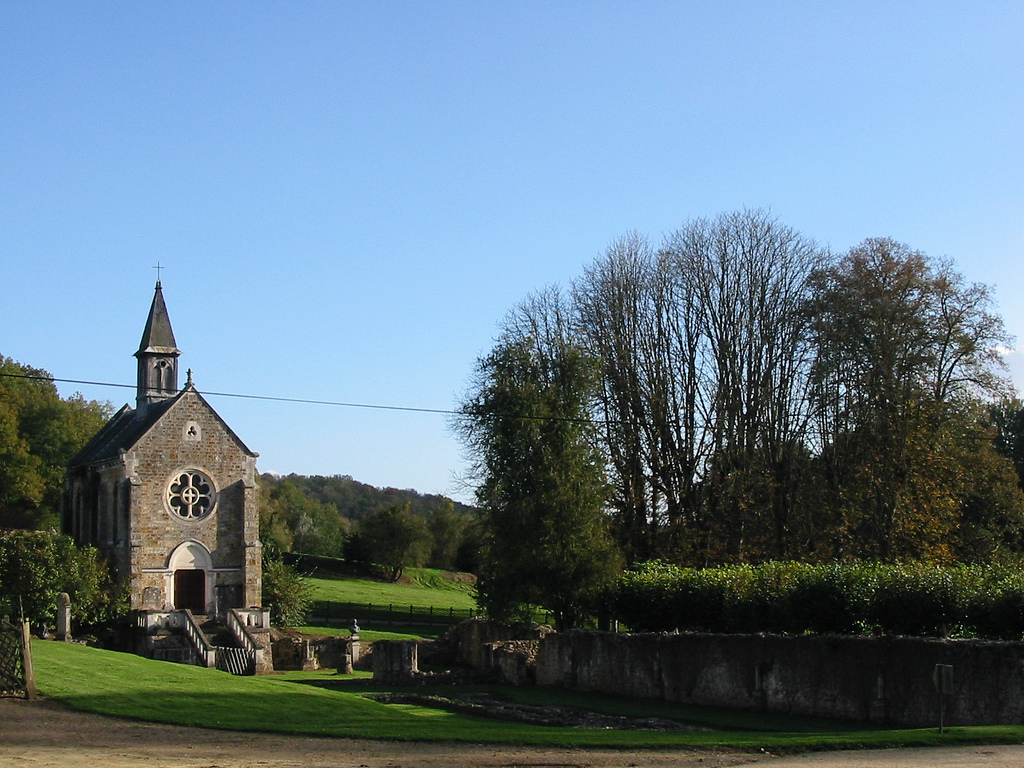
Port-Royal-des-Champs

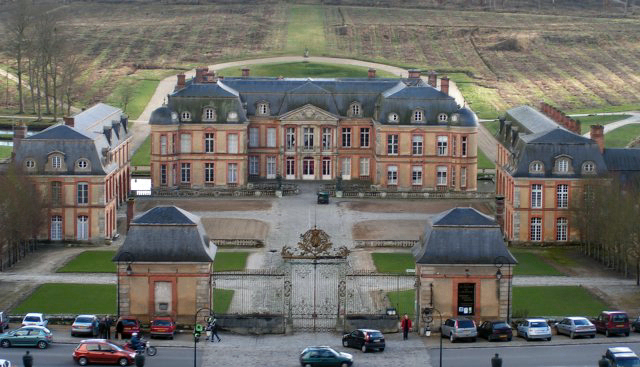
Château de Dampierre

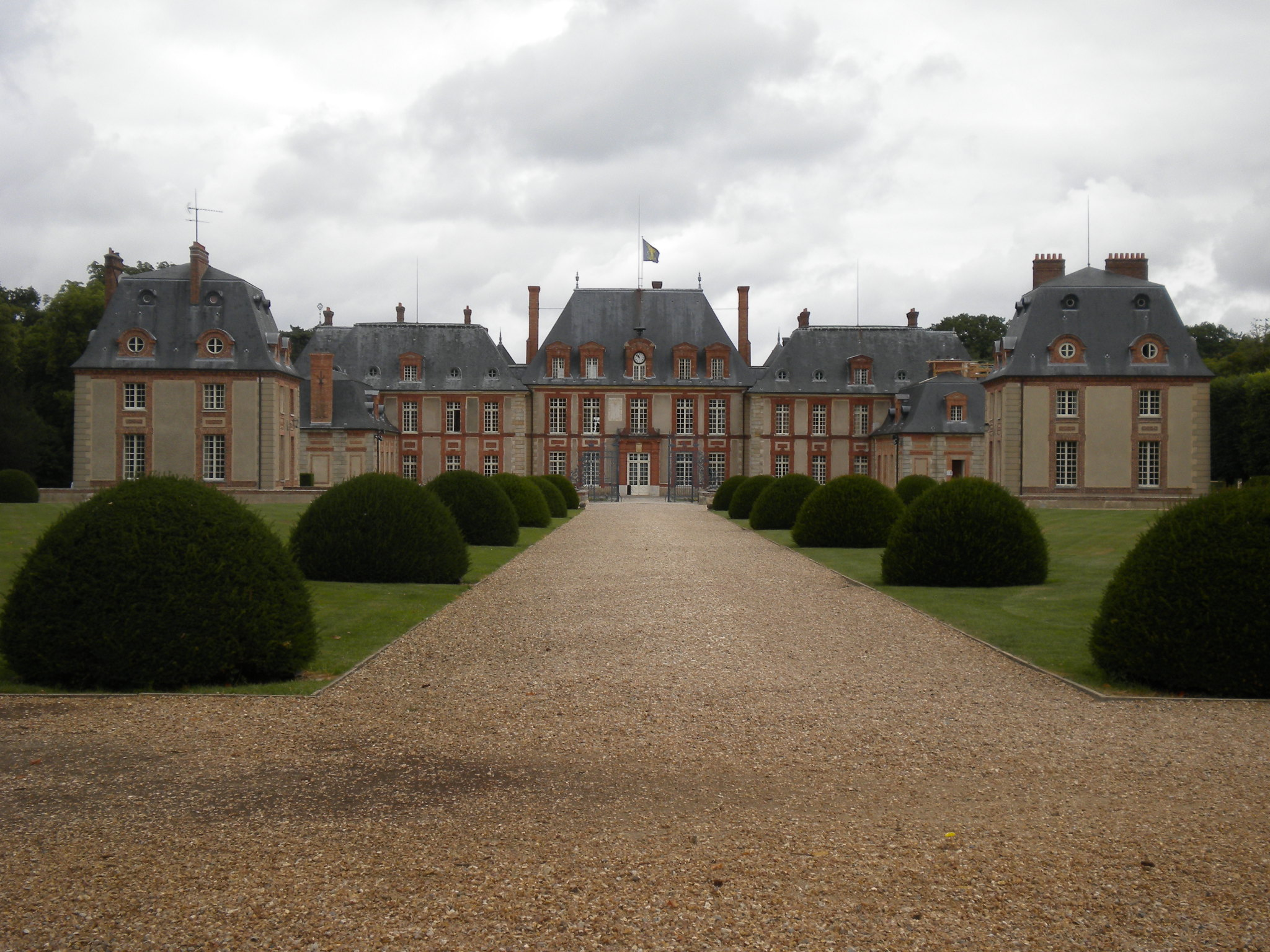
Château de Breteuil

== See also ==
- List of regional natural parks of France
