= Jules Vinçard =

French humorist

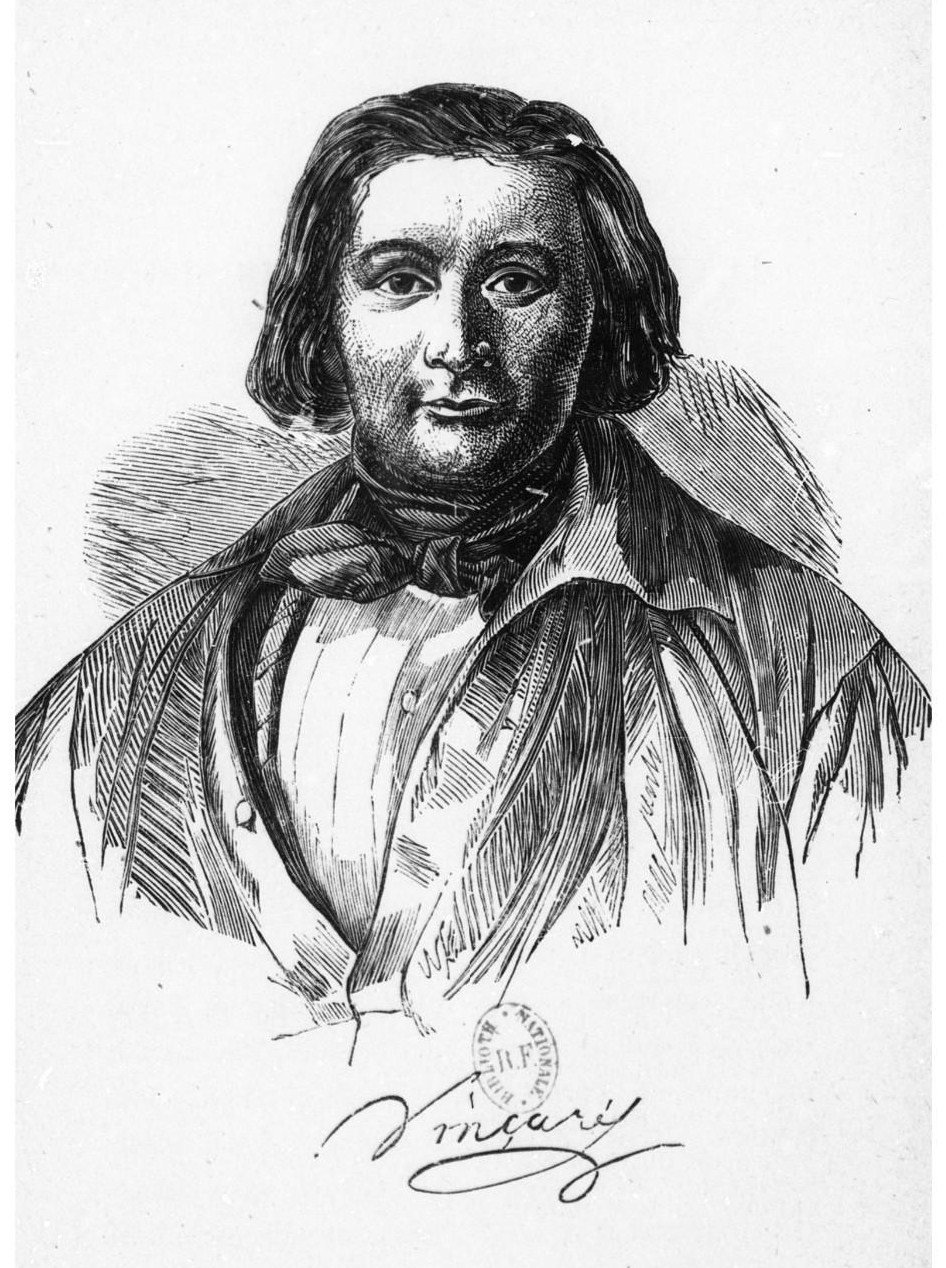
Jules Vinçard

Louis Edmé Jean Baptiste Vinçard, called Vinçard aîné or Jules Vinçard, born 12 thermidor an IV (30 July 1796) in Paris, died after 1878, was an artisan manufacturer of linear measurements, chansonnier, goguettier, follower and propagandist of Saint-Simonianism. He was editor of the newspaper La Ruche populaire. He lived in Saint-Maur-des-Fossés (Seine) for some time.

The writer and journalist Pierre Vinçard, with whom he is sometimes mistaken, was his nephew.

He was also a very active goguettier and participated in particular to the activities of the goguettes Lice chansonnière, l'Enfer and le Lycée.

== Sources ==
- Jules Vinçard Mémoires épisodiques d'un vieux chansonnier saint-simonien E. Dentu éditeur, Paris 1878.
