= Thobois =

Thobois is a surname. Notable people with the surname include:

- Étienne Thobois (born 1967), French badminton player
- Ingrid Thobois (born 1980), French novelist and development worker
- Kévin Thobois, French motorcycle racer
