= Guinguette =

French drinking establishment

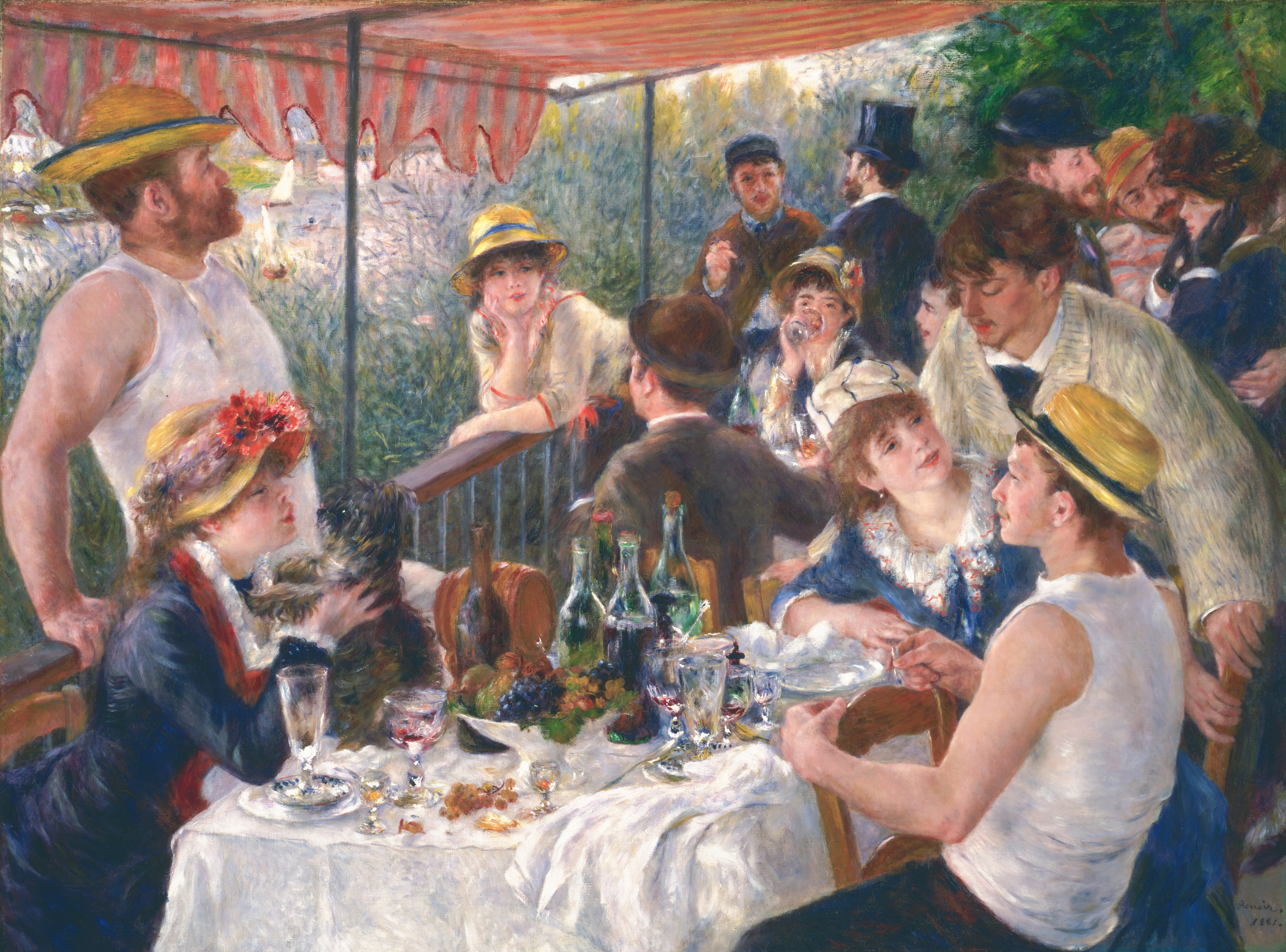
Guinguette atmosphere in the Déjeuner de Canotiers of Auguste Renoir

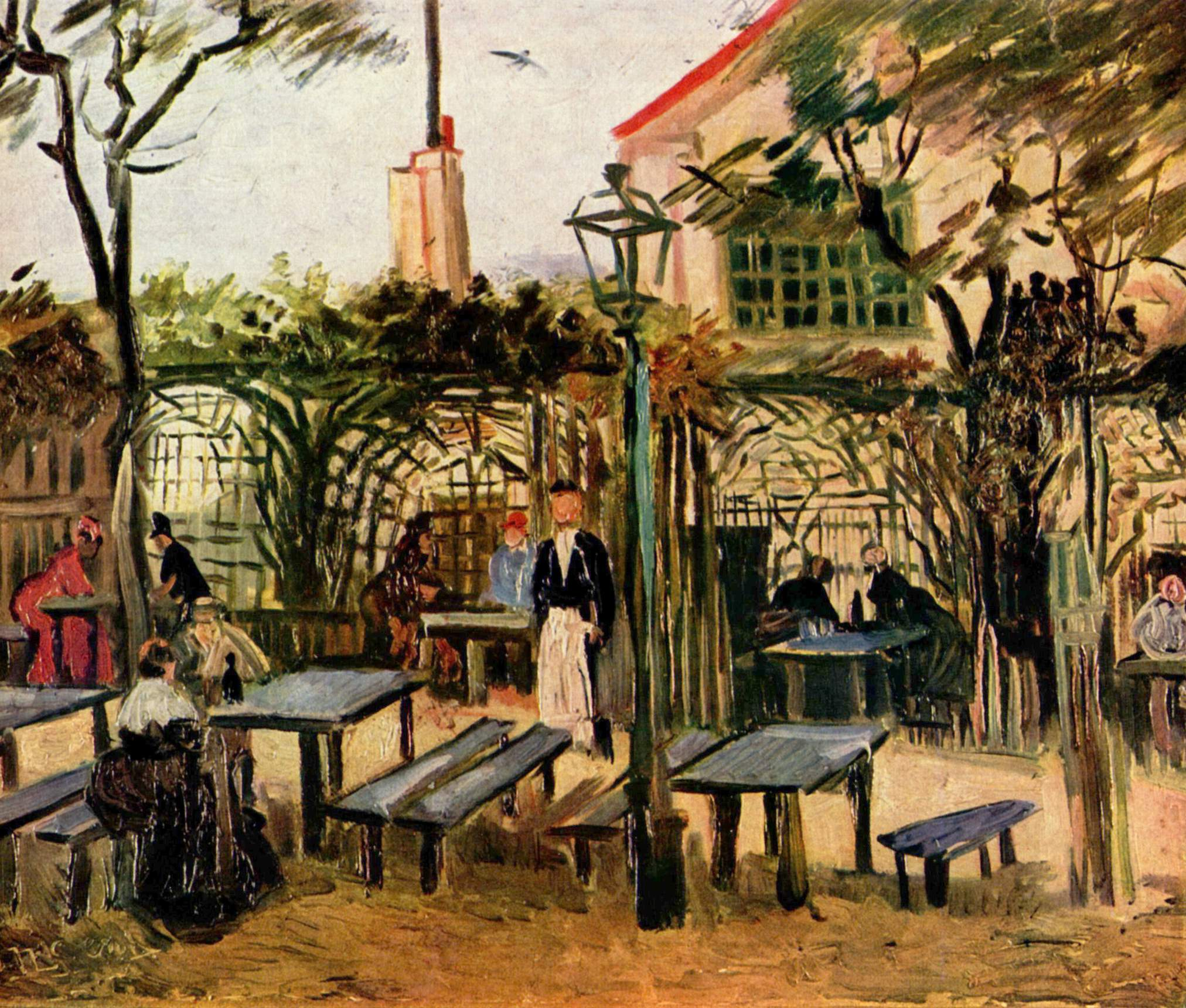
La guinguette, Vincent van Gogh

The guinguette (French pronunciation: [ɡɛ̃ɡɛt]), originating in the 17th century, was a type of popular tavern in the suburbs of Paris and of other cities in France. The term comes from guinguet, a type of cheap green wine served there. A goguette was a venue for informal solo and ensemble singing, and goguettes also served as places for drinking, socialising, and recreation.

== History ==
During the 18th century, a consumer revolution led once-isolated villages and hamlets outside Paris to be swept up in a booming material culture. Commodities, and particularly alcohol, consumed outside the customs barrier of the city were considerably cheaper, being exempt from state taxes. This encouraged the growth of an entertainment industry just beyond the tax man's reach, and a network of drinking establishments was established. They were especially popular on Sundays and holidays, when Parisians would visit to enjoy themselves and to get drunk cheaply. Today, the term 'guinguette' is still used for a waterside refreshment stand, particularly open-air, all over France.

The development of railways in the 1880s and the establishment of the "Gare de la Bastille" (Bastille station) with many trains serving the eastern suburbs of Paris (such as Nogent sur Marne) contributed to the success of guinguettes.

== Geography ==
The majority are on the edges of the Seine and the Marne rivers, and some are in a district that stretches to the outskirts of Rouen. Some guinguettes were however far from the rivers, as the picturesque guinguettes of le Plessis-Robinson built among the chestnut trees. There were hundreds of guinguettes as far away as Nogent-sur-Seine, where the nature of the Seine valley changes most.

== Decline and rebirth of the tradition ==
Today guinguettes are objects of nostalgia. The guinguettes were marvelous places to return to lighter times during the Années folles of the 1920s. They were obviously an eminent subject for painting during the first half of the 20th century.

But television and the ban on bathing in the rivers in the 1960s caused the decline of guinguettes. This ban was justified for reasons of hygiene (water quality deteriorated in the 1960s and 1970s) and safety (the risk due to barge traffic and drowning). In the 1960s, guinguettes became a subject of nostalgia. Many people forgot guinguettes, as the French scriptwriter Michel Audiard had one of his characters point out. Since the 1980s, there has been a small revival, particularly along the Marne river. In 2008, some guinguettes were open every weekend.

As of 2008, a gradual return to modern guinguettes had begun, notably in Paris, with opening of la Guinguette de Rosa Bonheur, named after the legendary 19th century feminist painter of the same name. Combining the spirit of the Camargue region in southern France, there are currently four distinct locations, beginning with the original in the Parc des Buttes-Chaumont, followed by Rosa-sur-Seine at the Port of Invalides, Rosa à l'ouest in Asnières-sur-Seine, and Rose à l'Est at the Chalet de la Porte Jaune in the Park Bois de Vincennes.

== See also ==
- Bal-musette
- Café-concert
- Eugène Imbert
- Lapin Agile

== Movies with guinguettes ==
- Nogent, Eldorado du dimanche ("Nogent, a Sunday Paradise") - Marcel Carné, 1929
- La belle équipe ("The Fine Crew"; They Were Five) - Julien Duvivier, 1936, with Jean Gabin singing the well-known waltz Quand on s' promène au bord de l'eau ("Walking at the Water's Edge")
- Casque d'or ("Golden Helmet") - Jacques Becker, 1952
