= Vallée de Chevreuse =

Valley of the Yvette River in Île-de-France

Coordinates: 48°42′N 2°2′E

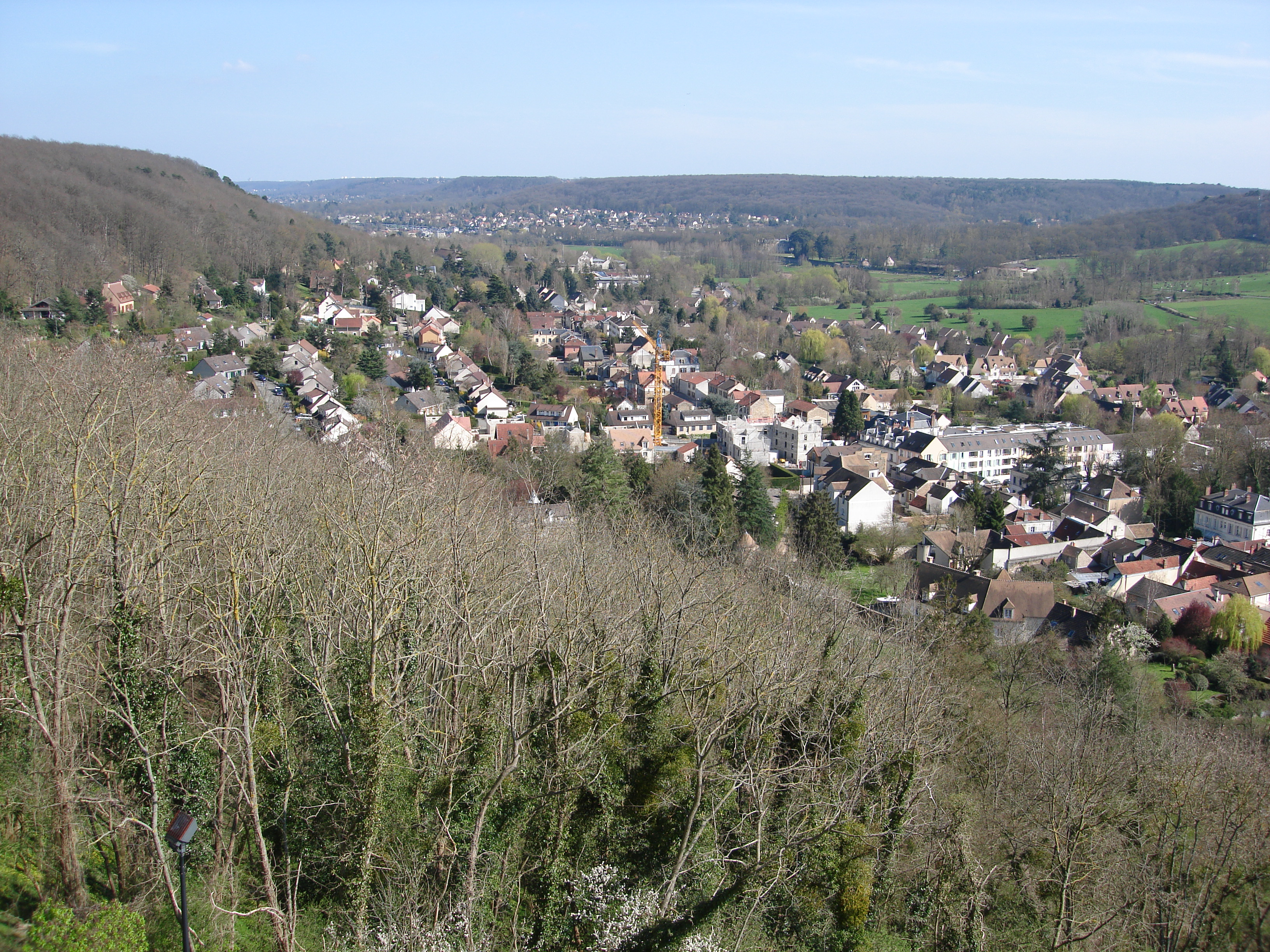
- View of Chevreuse and the Chevreuse valley

Geography
- Location: France
- Population centers: Chevreuse; Saint-Rémy-lès-Chevreuse; Choisel; Dampierre
- Rivers: Yvette
- Interactive map of Vallée de Chevreuse

Vallée de Chevreuse (French pronunciation: [vale də ʃəvʁøz], Chevreuse Valley) is the valley of the Yvette River in the Yvelines and Essonne departments.

It encompasses the communes around Chevreuse (Saint-Rémy-lès-Chevreuse, Choisel, Dampierre, etc.) within the Parc naturel régional de la haute vallée de Chevreuse and communes further downstream until Palaiseau: Gif-sur-Yvette, Bures-sur-Yvette, Orsay, Villebon-sur-Yvette, etc.

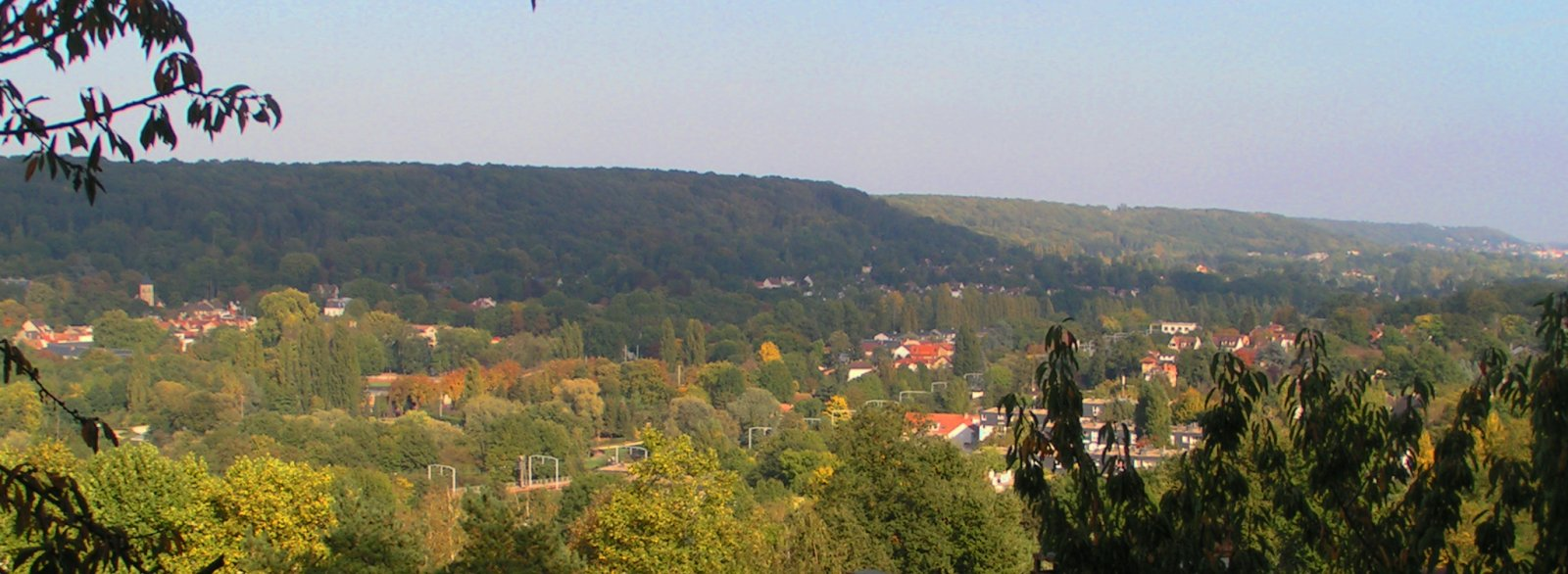
Vallée de Chevreuse at Gif-sur-Yvette.
