= Chevreuse =

- Commune
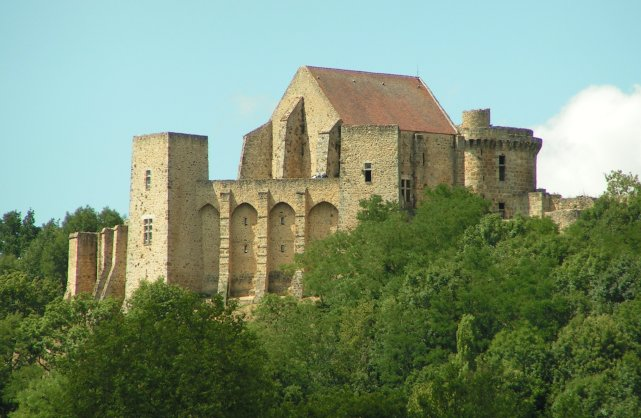
- Château de la Madeleine

- Coat of arms
- Location of Chevreuse
- Location within France Location within Île-de-France (region)
- Coordinates: 48°42′30″N 2°02′21″E
- Country: France
- Region: Île-de-France
- Department: Yvelines
- Arrondissement: Rambouillet
- Canton: Maurepas

Government
  - Mayor (2021–2026): Anne Hery-Le Pallec
- Area^{1}: 13.42 km^{2} (5.18 sq mi)
- Elevation: 85 m (279 ft)
- Highest elevation: 174 m (571 ft)
- Lowest elevation: 72 m (236 ft)
- Population (2023): 5,502
  - Density: 410.0/km^{2} (1,062/sq mi)
- Time zone: UTC+01:00 (CET)
  - Summer (DST): UTC+02:00 (CEST)
- INSEE/Postal code: 78160 /78460
- ^{1} French Land Register data, which excludes lakes, ponds, glaciers > 1 km^{2} (0.386 sq mi or 247 acres) and river estuaries.

Chevreuse (French pronunciation: [ʃəvʁøz]) is a commune in the French department of Yvelines, administrative region of Île-de-France, north-central France.

== Geography ==
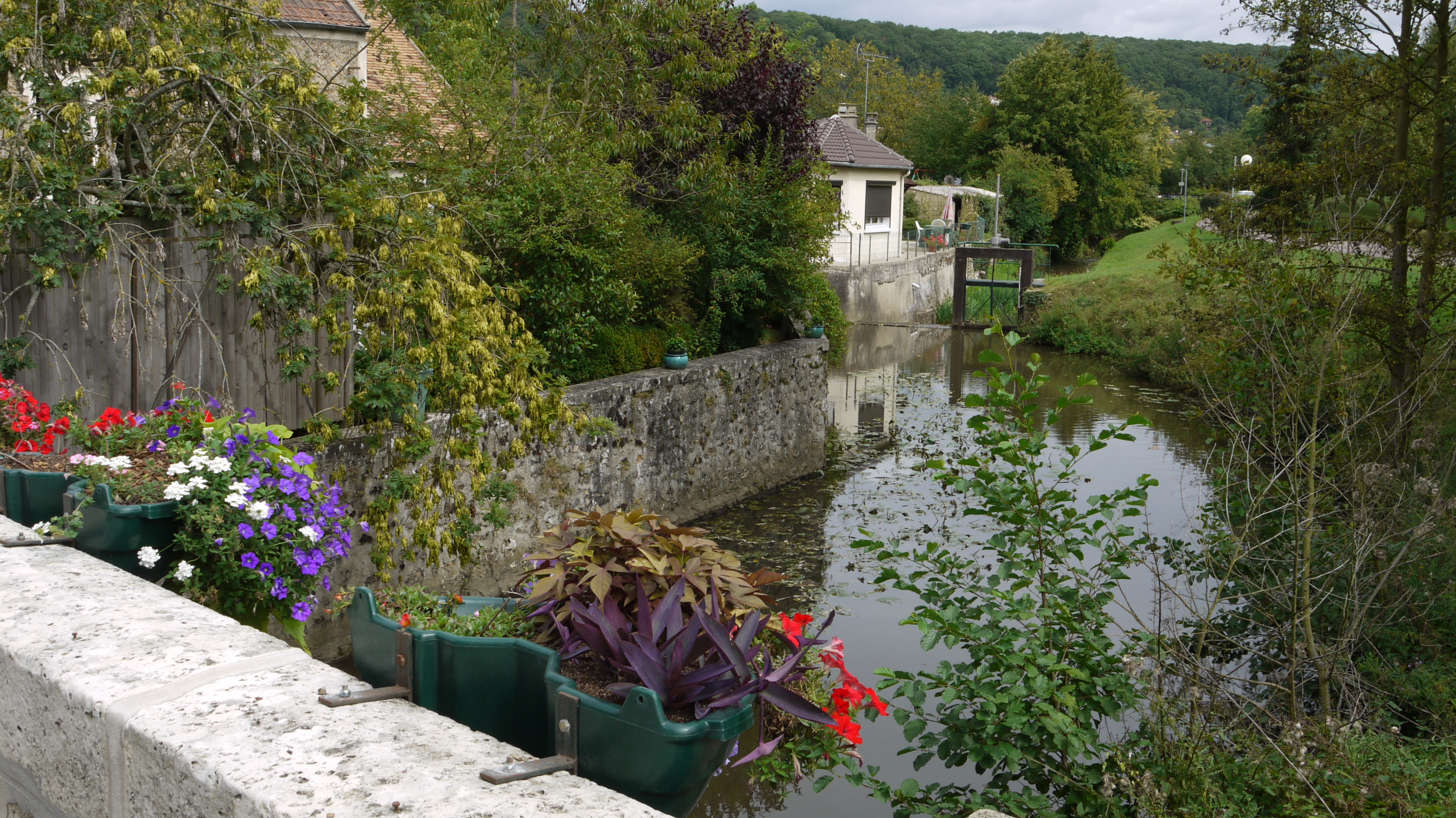
The Yvette river at Chevreuse

Chevreuse is located south of Paris, in the middle of a regional natural park, Parc naturel régional de la haute vallée de Chevreuse. The river Yvette flows through the area, forming the fertile Vallée de Chevreuse.

== History ==
Chevreuse was founded in the 10th century, and celebrated its first millennium of existence in 1980. Its castle, the Château de la Madeleine, dates back to the 11th century.

The writer Patrice Pluyette, winner of the 2008 Prix Amerigo Vespucci, was born in Chevreuse in 1977.

== Population ==
Historical population
Year	Pop.	±% p.a.
1968	3,409	—
1975	4,186	+2.98%
1982	4,811	+2.01%
1990	5,027	+0.55%
1999	5,364	+0.72%
2007	5,686	+0.73%
2012	5,789	+0.36%
2017	5,678	−0.39%
2023	5,502	−0.52%
Source: INSEE

== Transportation ==
Chevreuse is serviced by the Paris suburban rail (RER B line) at the Saint-Rémy-lès-Chevreuse station in the neighboring commune by the same name, 2 km to the east. The nearest Transilien station is Trappes, 8 km to the north.

== See also ==
- Duke of Chevreuse
- Port-Royal-des-Champs
- Communes of the Yvelines department
- Jean Racine
