= Hugo Boris =

French writer (born 1979)

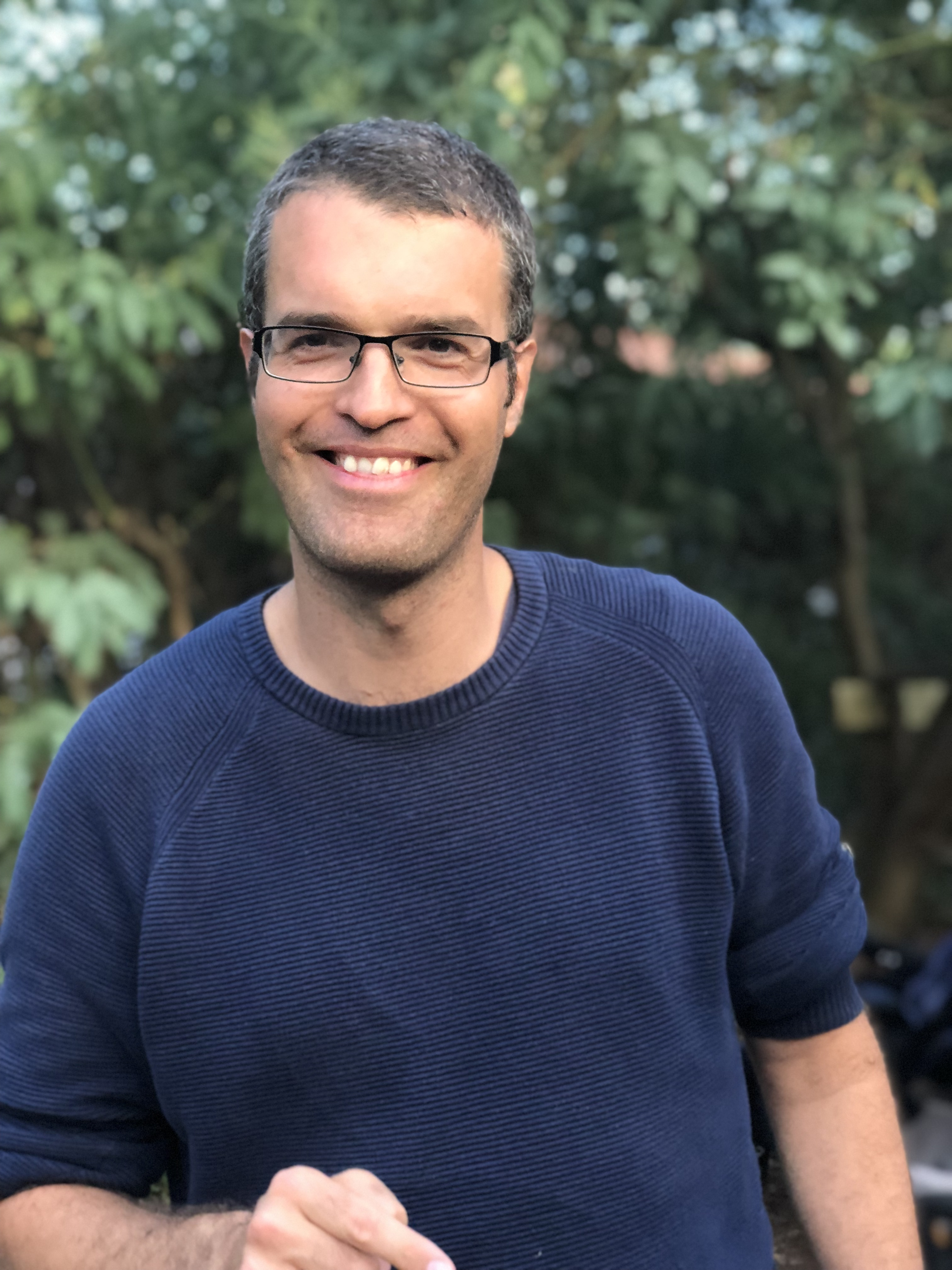
Hugo Boris

Hugo Boris (born 18 November 1979 in Paris), is a French writer.

== Biography ==
Born in 1979, Boris is graduated from the Institut d'études politiques de Bordeaux and the École nationale supérieure Louis-Lumière.

In 2003, his short story N'oublie pas de montrer ma tête au peuple, published by Mercure de France, earned him the prix du jeune écrivain.

His first novel, Le Baiser dans la nuque (The kiss in the neck), was published by Éditions Belfond in 2005. The book, which describes the meeting of a piano teacher with a deaf midwife, was rewarded by the Festival of the first novel of Chambéry and by the Prix Emmanuel Roblès. The book met a critical and public success which made it one of the events of the literary season. Télérama evoked a novel "light as a song, dark as a requiem", of a writing which "always leaves the emotion pass, the poetry, without sentimentality", a text which goes "against the publications of the literary season that trumpet and storm" Elle wrote of a text "with a sustained, almost musical rhythm, nourished by a lively and often poignant writing of humanity".

In 2007, appeared La Délégation norvégienne (The Norwegian Delegation), which developed a criminal intrigue where the assassin is the reader in person. The last pages of this new "behind closed doors", in the heart of a Scandinavian forest, are not cut out. The reader must have a paper cutter to cut them and, in so doing, commit a literary murder. This second novel, finalist of the grand prix RTL-Lire, won the first prix littéraire des Hebdos en Région. Le Monde des Livres speaks of a novel "playful like a Cluedo, disturbing like a Hitchcock". Lire, tells of an author who is beyond the process, closes the trap and holds us like puppets".

Je n’ai pas dansé depuis longtemps (I haven't danced for a long time), published in 2010, recounts the initiatory journey of a Soviet cosmonaut in weightlessness for more than four hundred days. The book was awarded the prix Amerigo Vespucci and was a finalist in many literary prizes, including the grand prix RTL-Lire, the Prix Landerneau, and the prix Françoise Sagan. Libération suggests that Je n’ai pas dansé depuis longtemps brings cosmonauts into literature. and Ciel et Espace talks about one of the best novels ever written about space. Le Nouvel Observateurmentions a "modern Jules Verne".

Each of Hugo Boris's books approaches a different genre, seems to take it up to imitate it, then deconstruct it. Apart from the game on genre, a certain number of obsessive themes haunt his romantic universe: huis-clos, bestiality, courage.

He recognizes Guy de Maupassant and Michel Tournier as major influences.

Hugo Boris also directed a dozen short films and worked as an assistant director on documentaries.

Published in 2013, his novel Trois grands fauves braids an imaginary umbilical cord between Georges Danton, Victor Hugo and Winston Churchill. The novel was selected in the final selection of the Style Award, and won the Thyde Monnier Award. Trois grands fauves was selected among the 25 best books of the year by the French newspaper Le Point.

In 2016, his novel Police was published by Grasset. Translated in several countries, Police was adapted into a film of the same name by the award-winning French director, Anne Fontaine.

== Works ==
- 2003: N’oublie pas de montrer ma tête au peuple, Mercure de France, collective work, ISBN 978-2715224384
- 2005: Le Baiser dans la nuque, Éditions Belfond, ISBN 2-7144-4193-9
- 2007: La Délégation norvégienne, Belfond, ISBN 978-2-7144-4249-9
- 2010: Je n’ai pas dansé depuis longtemps, Belfond, ISBN 978-2-7144-4513-1, BnF 42140247z
- 2013: Trois Grands Fauves, Belfond, 2013 ISBN 978-2714454447
- 2016: POLICE, Grasset, ISBN 978-2-246-86144-7

== Prizes ==
- 2003: Prix du jeune écrivain for the short story N’oublie pas de montrer ma tête au peuple;
- 2006: Prix Emmanuel Roblès for Le Baiser dans la nuque;
- 2008: Prix littéraire des Hebdos en Région for La Délégation norvégienne.
- 2010: Prix Amerigo Vespucci for Je n’ai pas dansé depuis longtemps.
- 2016: Prix Eugène Dabit du roman populiste for POLICE.
