= François Garde =

French writer and high-ranking official (born 1959)

François Garde (born 1959 in Le Cannet, Alpes-Maritimes) is a French writer and high-ranking official

== Administrative career ==
- Graduated in 1984 of the ENA (class Louise Michel),
- Deputy Secretary-General of New Caledonia from 1991 to 1993
- Administrator-Superior of French Southern and Antarctic Lands (from 25 May 2000 to 19 December 2004)
- Secretary-General of the Government of New-Caledonia, August 2009 – August 2010,
- Vice-President of the Administrative court at Dijon, then Grenoble.

== Works ==
Garde began to write at the age of over forty years and since 2003 has published various books and two novels.

=== Essays ===
- 2003: Les Institutions de la Nouvelle-Calédonie.,
- 2006: Paul-Émile Victor et la France de l'Antarctique.,
- 2015: La Baleine dans tous ses états.

=== Novels ===
- 2012: Ce qu'il advint du sauvage blanc.
  - prix Goncourt du premier roman 2012
  - grand prix Jean-Giono 2012.
  - prix littéraire des grands espaces Maurice Dousset 2012
  - prix Hortense Dufour 2012.
  - prix Edmée de La Rochefoucauld 2012
  - prix Emmanuel Roblès 2012
  - prix Amerigo Vespucci 2012.
  - prix Ville de Limoges 2012.
- 2013: Pour trois couronnes, Gallimard
- 2016: L’Effroi, Gallimard
