= Night Shift (2020 film) =

- Theatrical release poster
- French: Police
- Directed by: Anne Fontaine
- Screenplay by: Claire Barré; Anne Fontaine
- Based on: Police by Hugo Boris
- Produced by: Jean-Louis Livi; Philippe Carcassonne
- Starring: Omar Sy; Virginie Efira; Grégory Gadebois; Payman Maadi
- Cinematography: Yves Angelo
- Edited by: Fabrice Rouaud
- Production companies: F Comme Film; Ciné@; StudioCanal; France 2 Cinéma; France 3 Cinéma; Korokoro; Scope Pictures
- Distributed by: StudioCanal; Athena Film
- Release dates: 23 February 2020 (Berlin); 2 September 2020 (France); 2 September 2020 (Belgium)
- Running time: 98 minutes
- Countries: France; Belgium
- Language: French
- Budget: €10.2 million
- Box office: $1.8 million

Night Shift (French: Police) is a 2020 drama film directed by Anne Fontaine, who co-wrote the screenplay with Claire Barré. It is an adaptation of the 2016 novel Police by Hugo Boris. It is a co-production between France and Belgium. The film stars Omar Sy, Virginie Efira, Grégory Gadebois and Payman Maadi. It had its world premiere at the 70th Berlin International Film Festival on 23 February 2020. It was released in France and Belgium on 2 September 2020.

== Premise ==
Three Parisian police officers are tasked with escorting an illegal immigrant from Tajikistan who is subject to deportation from France. The officers face an ethical dilemma when they are confronted with the reality that their prisoner will likely be killed upon return to his home country.

== Cast ==
- Omar Sy as Aristide
- Virginie Efira as Virginie
- Grégory Gadebois as Erik
- Payman Maadi as Tohirov
- Aurore Broutin as the psychologist
- Thierry Levaret as Hervé
- Cécile Rebboah as the social worker
- Anne-Pascale Clairembourg as Martine
- Cédric Vieira as Virginie's husband
- Tadrina Hocking as the gynecologist
- Elisa Lasowski as Sonia
- Emmanuel Barrouyer as the abusive husband

== Production ==
Night Shift was produced by Jean-Louis Livi at F Comme Film and Philippe Carcassonne at Ciné@, in co-production with StudioCanal, France 2 Cinéma, France 3 Cinéma, Omar Sy's Korokoro and Belgian firm Scope Pictures.

Principal photography took place in Paris and in the Île-de-France region, beginning on 4 February 2019 and lasting nine weeks. Restricted by the ban on filming in police stations, interior scenes were instead shot in a former Orange S.A. data center located in Antony, Hauts-de-Seine.

== Release ==
Night Shift was selected to be screened in the Berlinale Special section at the 70th Berlin International Film Festival. It had its world premiere in Berlin on 23 February 2020.

The film was originally scheduled to be released theatrically on 1 April 2020, but was postponed due to the French government's decision to close cinemas in response to the COVID-19 pandemic. The release was initially rescheduled to 6 May 2020, but was postponed to 3 June 2020. The film was finally released on 2 September 2020, by StudioCanal in France and Athena Films in Belgium.

== Reception ==
=== Critical response ===
Night Shift received an average rating of 3.3 out of 5 stars on the French website AlloCiné, based on 31 reviews. On Rotten Tomatoes, the film holds an approval rating of 67% based on 6 reviews, with an average rating of 6.7/10.

Jordan Mintzer of The Hollywood Reporter wrote, "The cast is convincing enough, and the changing viewpoints intriguing enough, to allow you to forget some of the broader aspects of the writing and delve into the character dynamics".

Jonathan Romney of Screen International wrote, "Night Shift – despite its clever, multi-angled opening gambit – proves a solemn, emotionally overwrought, narratively implausible affair".
