= Prix Amerigo Vespucci =

French literary award

Prix Amerigo-Vespucci
- Description: French literary award honoring works centered on adventure and travel
- Country: France
- Presented by: International Festival of Geography
- Website: http://www.ecrivosges.com/prixconcours/amerigovespucci.php

The prix Amerigo-Vespucci is a French literary award established in 1990, during the first International Festival of Geography (IFG) at Saint-Dié-des-Vosges. It rewards works on the theme of adventure and travel and refers to the Italian navigator Amerigo Vespucci.

Featuring 2500 euros (in 2014), it is traditionally awarded at the inauguration of the Book Fair. An Amerigo Vespucci Youth Award is also presented. The current value of the prize is 1,500 euros according to the official website of the festival.

== Laureates of prix Amerigo Vespucci ==
- 1990: Claude Leborgne, La Prison nomade (François Bourin)
- 1991: Pierre-Jean Rémy, Chine (Albin Michel)
- 1992: Anka Muhlstein, Cavelier de la Salle (Éditions Grasset)
- 1993: Liliane Sichler, La Chinoise du Pacific Railway (Grasset)
- 1994: Michel Marty, L'Île rouge Éditions Phébus
- 1995: Isabelle Jarry, 23 Lettres d'Amérique (Fayard)
- 1996: Yves Ouahnon, Le Calendrier de Cordoue (Éditions Autrement)
- 1997: Éric Fottorino, Cœur d'Afrique (Stock)
- 1998: Gisèle Pineau, L'Âme prêtée aux oiseaux (Stock)
- 1999: Gilles Lapouge, Besoin de mirages (Éditions du Seuil)
- 2000: Ahmadou Kourouma, Allah n'est pas obligé (Le Seuil)
- 2001: Jean-Luc Coatalem, Je suis dans les mers du Sud, sur les traces de Paul Gauguin (Grasset)
- 2002: Abdelkader Djemaï, Camping (Le Seuil)
- 2003: Marc Durin-Valois, Chamelle (JC Lattès)
- 2004: France Huser, Le Murmure des sables (Le Seuil)
- 2005: Jean-Paul Delfino, Corcovado (Éditions Métailié)
- 2006: Pierre Pelot, L'Ombre des voyageuses (Éditions Héloïse d'Ormesson)
- 2007: Bernard Giraudeau, Les Dames de nage (Éditions Métaillié)
- 2008: Patrice Pluyette, La Traversée du Mozambique par temps calme (Le Seuil)
- 2009: Isabelle Autissier, Seule la mer s'en souviendra (Grasset)
- 2010: Hugo Boris, Je n'ai pas dansé depuis longtemps (Éditions Belfond)
- 2011: Olivier Weber, Le Barbaresque (Flammarion)
- 2012: François Garde, Ce qu'il advint du sauvage blanc (Éditions Gallimard)
- 2013: Laurent-Frédéric Bollée and Philippe Nicloux for Terra Australis (Glénat)
- 2014: Laurent Mauvignier, Autour du monde (Les Éditions de Minuit)
- 2015: Grégoire Polet, Barcelona ! (Gallimard)
- 2016: Doan Bui, Le Silence de mon père (L'Iconoclaste)
- 2017: Raphaël Jerusalmy, Évacuation (Actes Sud)
- 2018: Michel Moutot, Les Séquoias (Editions du Seuil)
- 2019: Emmanuel Ruben, Sur la route du Danube (Rivages)
- 2020: Sandrine Colette, Et toujours les forêts (Jean-Claude Lattès)
- 2021: Luc Bronner, Chaudun, la montagne blessée, (Editions du Seuil).
- 2025: Sacha Bertrand, 11h02 le vent se lève
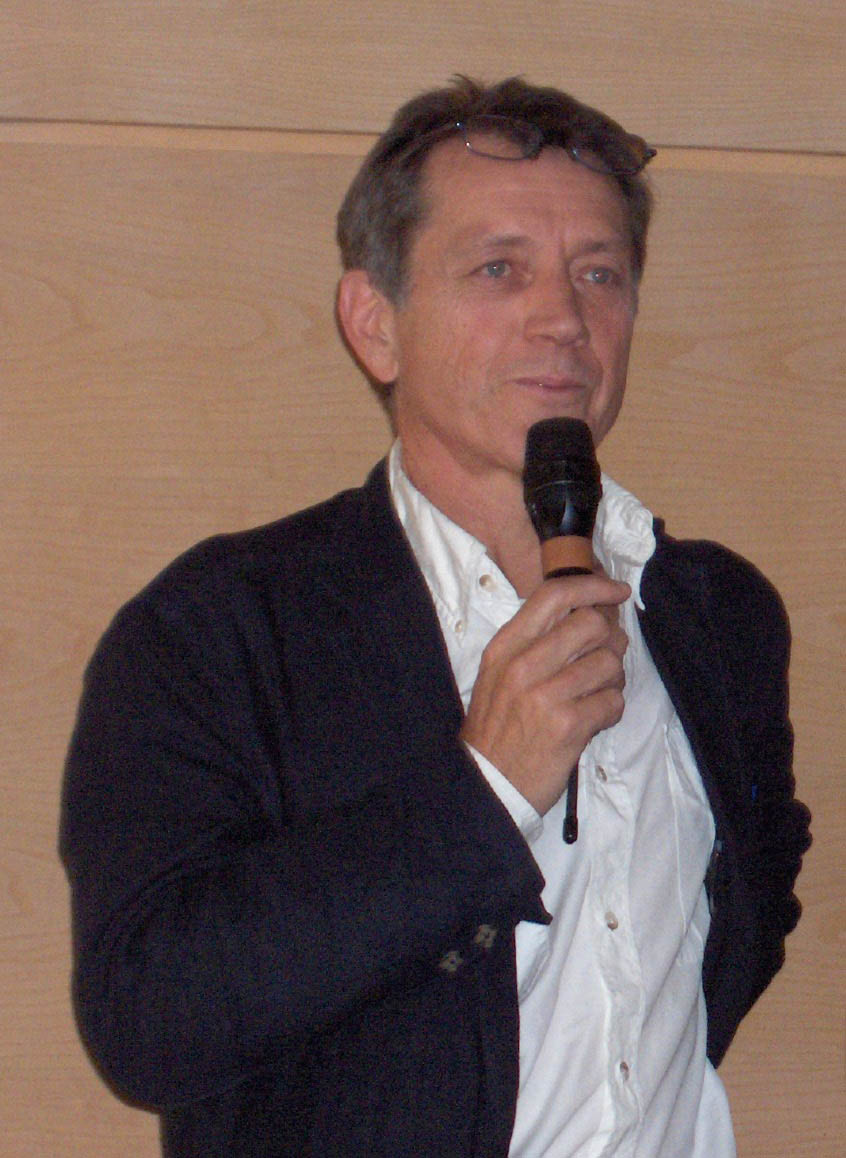
Bernard Giraudeau, laureate 2007

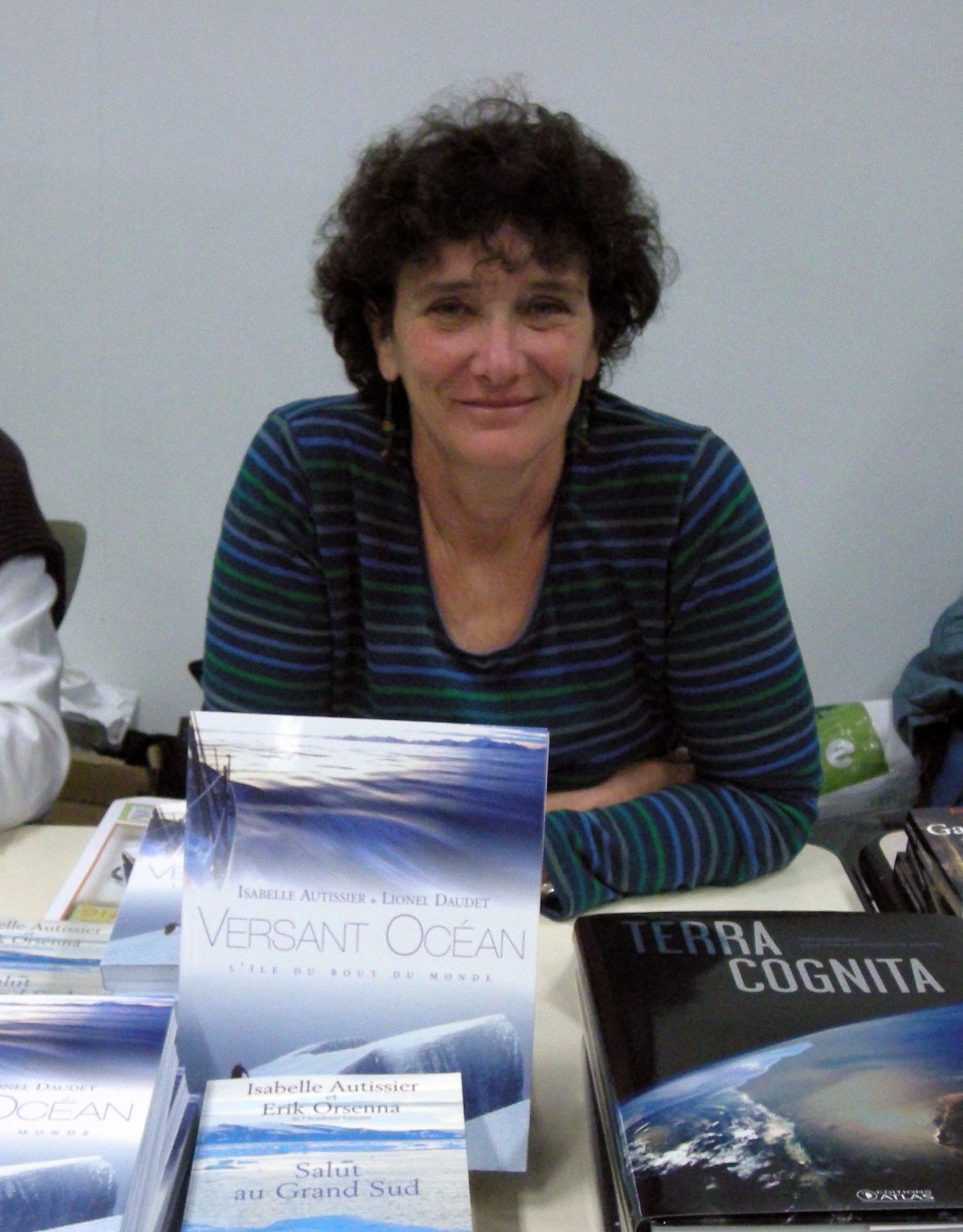
Isabelle Autissier, laureate 2009

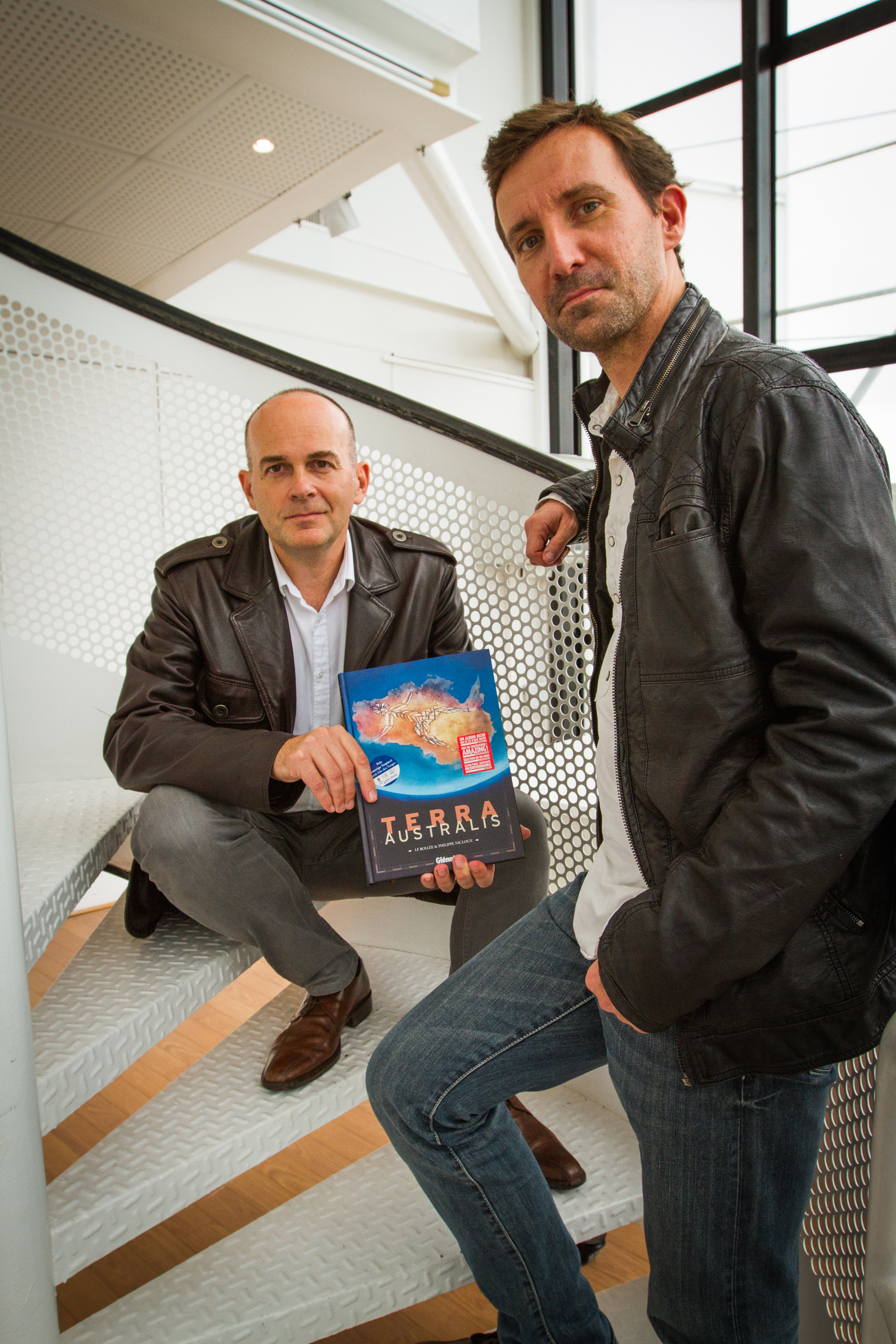
Laurent-Frédéric Bollée and Philippe Nicloux, laureates 2013

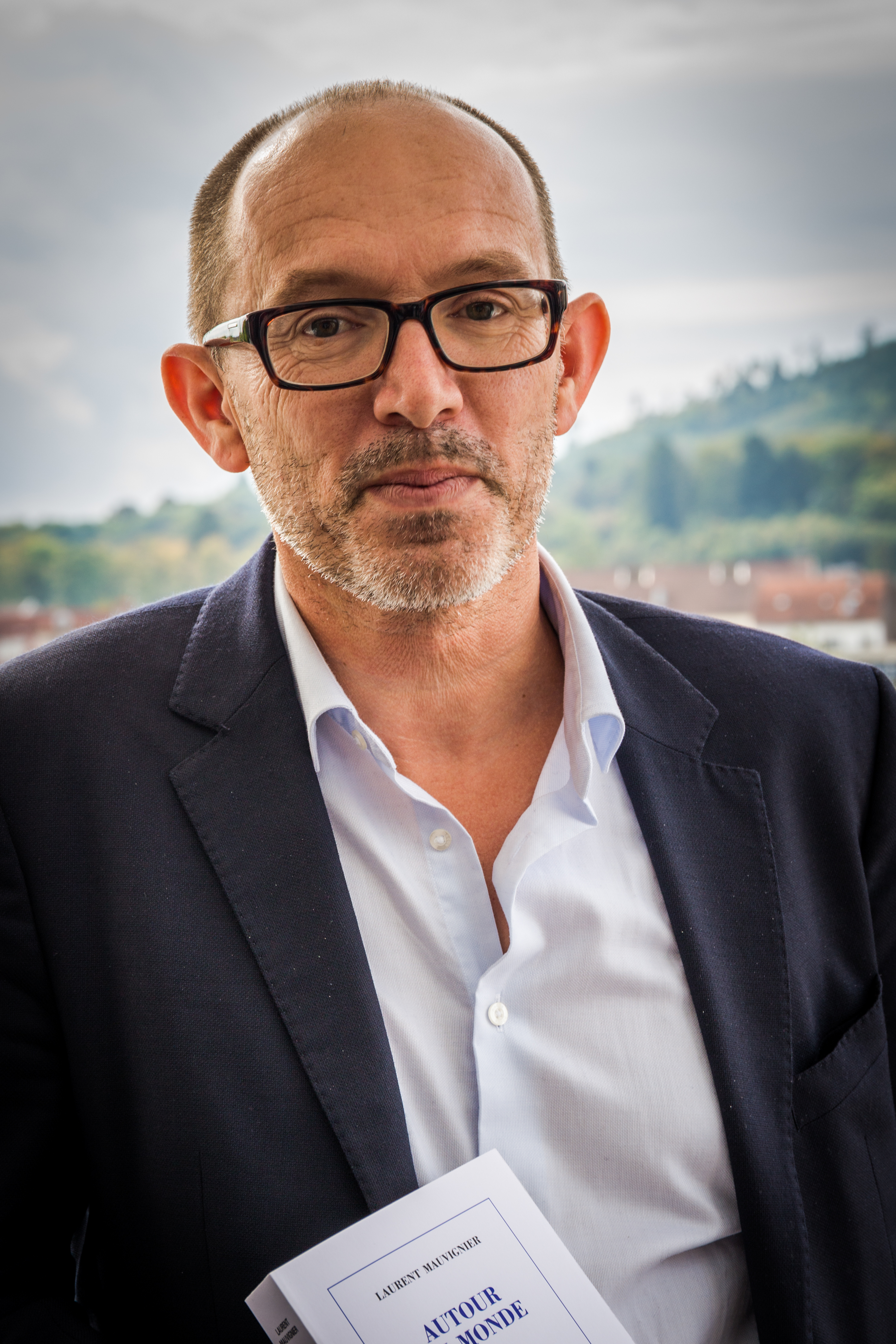
Laurent Mauvignier, laureate 2014

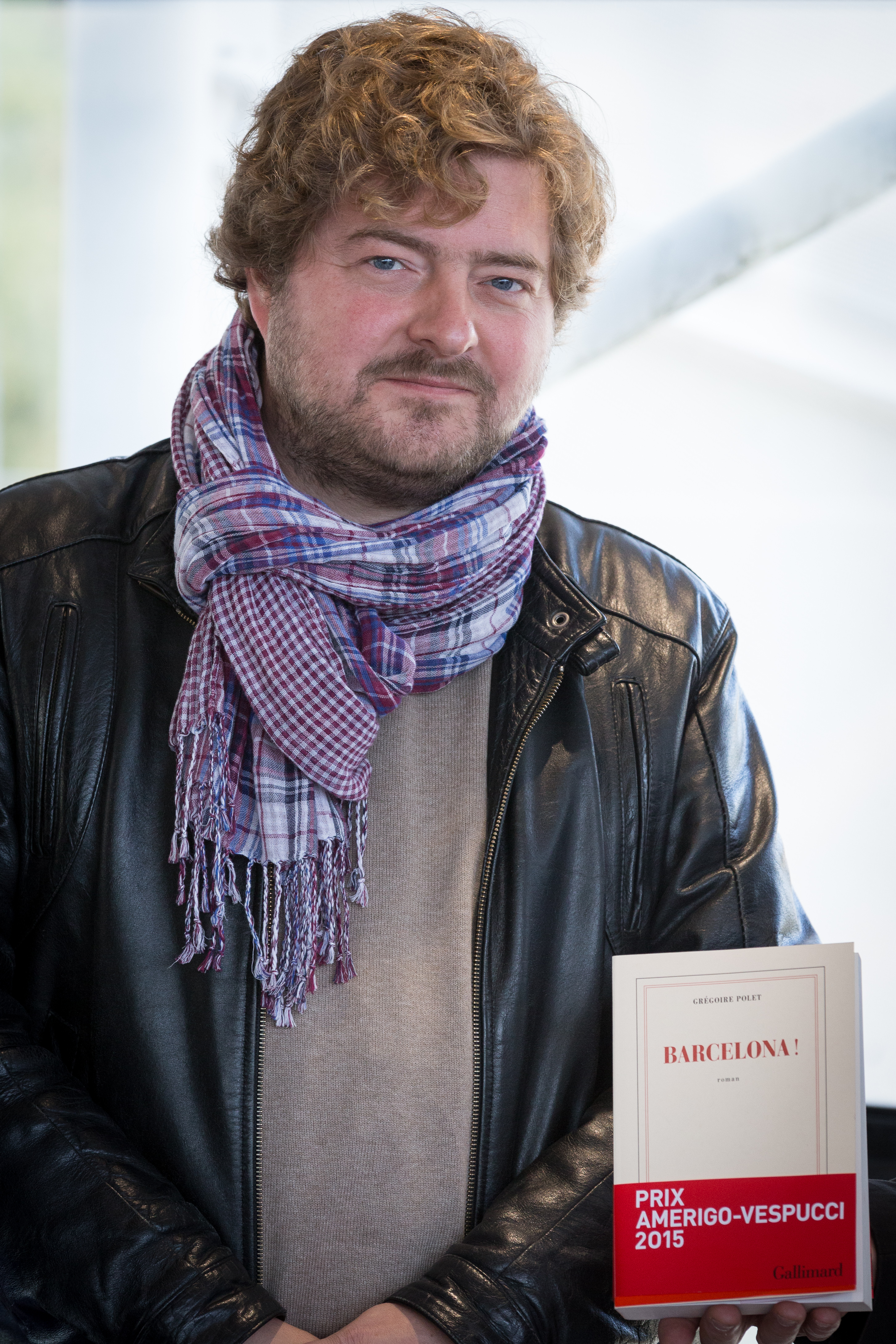
Grégoire Polet, laureate 2015

== Laureates of the prix Amerigo Vespucci for youth ==
- 1990: John Howe and Gérard Jaegger, Amerigo Vespucci (La Joie de lire).
- 1991: Sylvie Girardet, Claire Merleau-Ponty and Anne Tardy, Les Routes de la soie (Bayard)
- 1992: Daniel Pennac, L'Agence Babel et L'Évasion de Kamo (Gallimard)
- 1993: Joëlle Wintrebert, Les Diables blancs (Gallimard)
- 1994: Bertrand Solet, La Troupe sans pareille (Hachette jeunesse)
- 1995: Danielle Martinigol, Les Oubliés de Vulcain (Hachette Jeunesse)
- 1996: Jean-François Chabas, Une moitié de Wasicum (Casterman)
- 1997: François Place, Du pays des Amazones aux îles Indigo (Casterman)
- 1998: Éric Boisset, Nicostratos (Magnard jeunesse).
- 1999: Daniel Vaxelaire, En haut la Liberté (Flammarion, Castor Poche)
- 2000: Catherine Porte and Rose-Claire Labalestra, Le roi Vagabond (Rageot, Cascade)
- 2001: Erik L'Homme, Livres des étoiles (Gallimard Jeunesse)
- 2002: Frédéric Toussaint and Anne Romby, La nuit de l'Ylang-Ylang (Actes Sud Junior)
- 2003: Jean-Baptiste de Panafieu, Planète eau douce (Gallimard Jeunesse) and Pierre-Marie Beaude, La maison des Lointains (Gallimard Jeunesse, Scripto)
- 2004: Didier Daeninckx and Laurent Corvaisier, L'Enfant du zoo (Rue du monde).
- 2005: Xavier-Laurent Petit, Le col des Mille Larmes (Flammarion, Castor poche)
- 2006: Carole Saturno, Enfants ici, parents d'ailleurs (Gallimard Jeunesse)
- 2007: François Place, Le Roi des Trois Orients (éditions Rue du Monde).
- 2008: Isabelle Collombat, Bienvenue à Goma (éditions du Rouergue).
- 2009: Guillaume Duprat, Le livre des terres imaginées (Seuil)
- 2010: Xavier-Laurent Petit, Mon petit cœur imbécile (École des Loisirs)
- 2011: Jean-Philippe Blondel and Florence Lebert (phot.), Qui vive ? (éditions Thierry Magnier)
- 2012: Yves-Marie Clément, Sur les traces de Walipo (Seuil Jeunesse)
- 2013: Geneviève Clastre and Lucie Placin, Le Goût de voyages chez Gallimard Jeunesse.
- 2014: Daniel Picouly and Nathalie Novi, Et si on redessinait le monde (éditions Rue du monde)
- 2015: Fleur Daugey and Sandrine Thommen, Les Oiseaux globe-trotters (Actes Sud Junior).
- 2016: Julien Billaudeau and Sébastien Gayet, À la découverte de la grotte Chauvet-Pont d'Arc (Actes Sud Junior).
- 2017: Johan Dayt, Une Italie (Maison Eliza)
- 2018: Thaï-Marc Le Thanh (text) and Lucile Piketty (illustration), Buffalo Bill (Le Seuil)
- 2019: Didier Cornille, La ville, quoi de neuf ? (Éditions Helium)
- 2020: Séraphine Menu, Biomimétisme (Editions La Pastèque)
- 2021: Julieta Canepa, Pierre Ducrozet et Stéphane Kiehl — Je suis au monde (Éditions Actes Sud Junior)
- 2022: Eva Bensard et Daniele Catalli — Hokusai et le Fujisan (Éditions Amaterra)
- 2023: Ingrid Thobois et Pascale Breysse — Histoire de se laver (Éditions Kilowatt)
- 2024: Tony Durand — Quelqu’un quelque part (Éditions Motus)
- 2025: Brice Postma Uzel — Les horizons sauvages (Éditions MeMo)
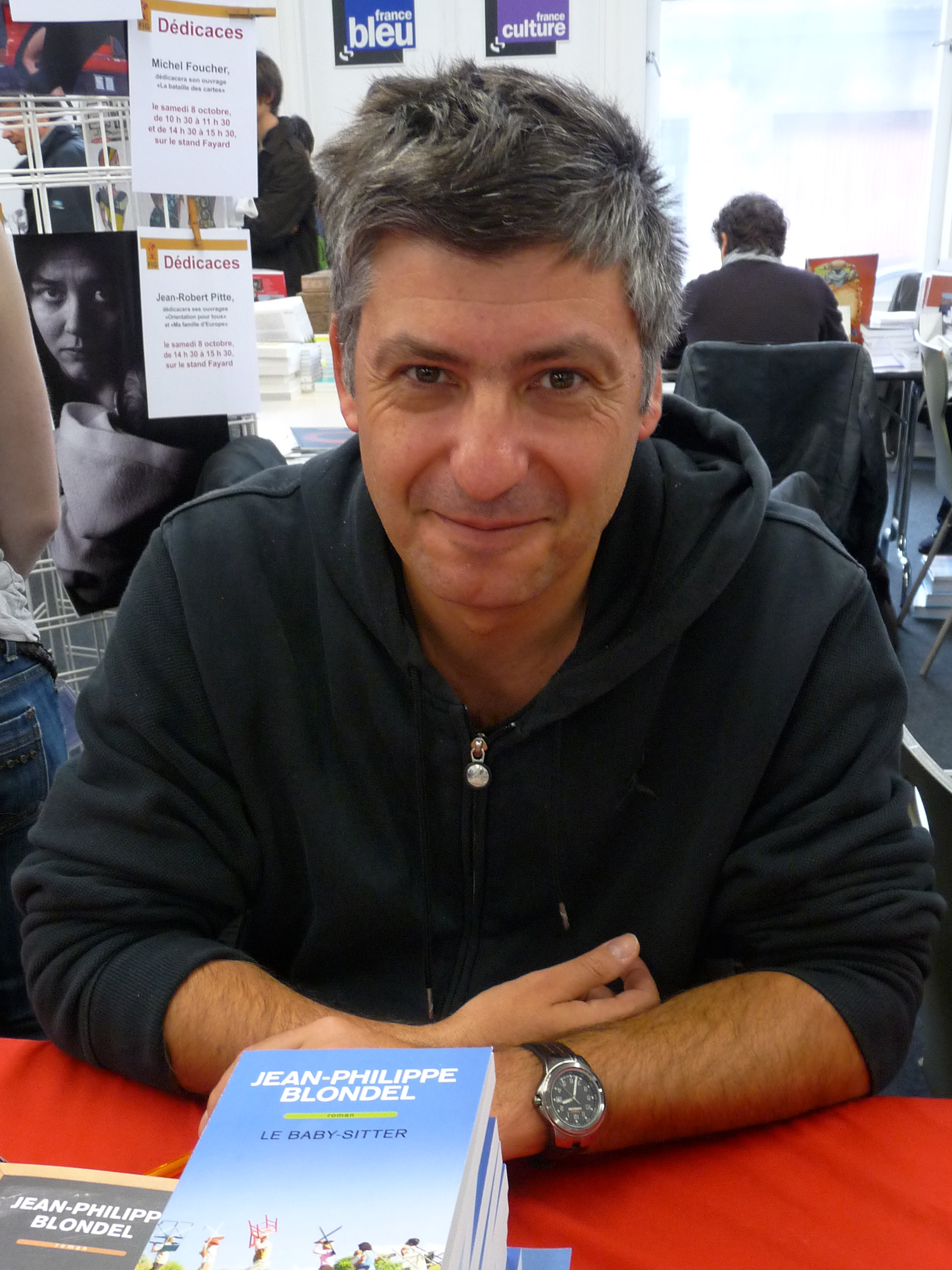
Jean-Philippe Blondel, laureate 2011

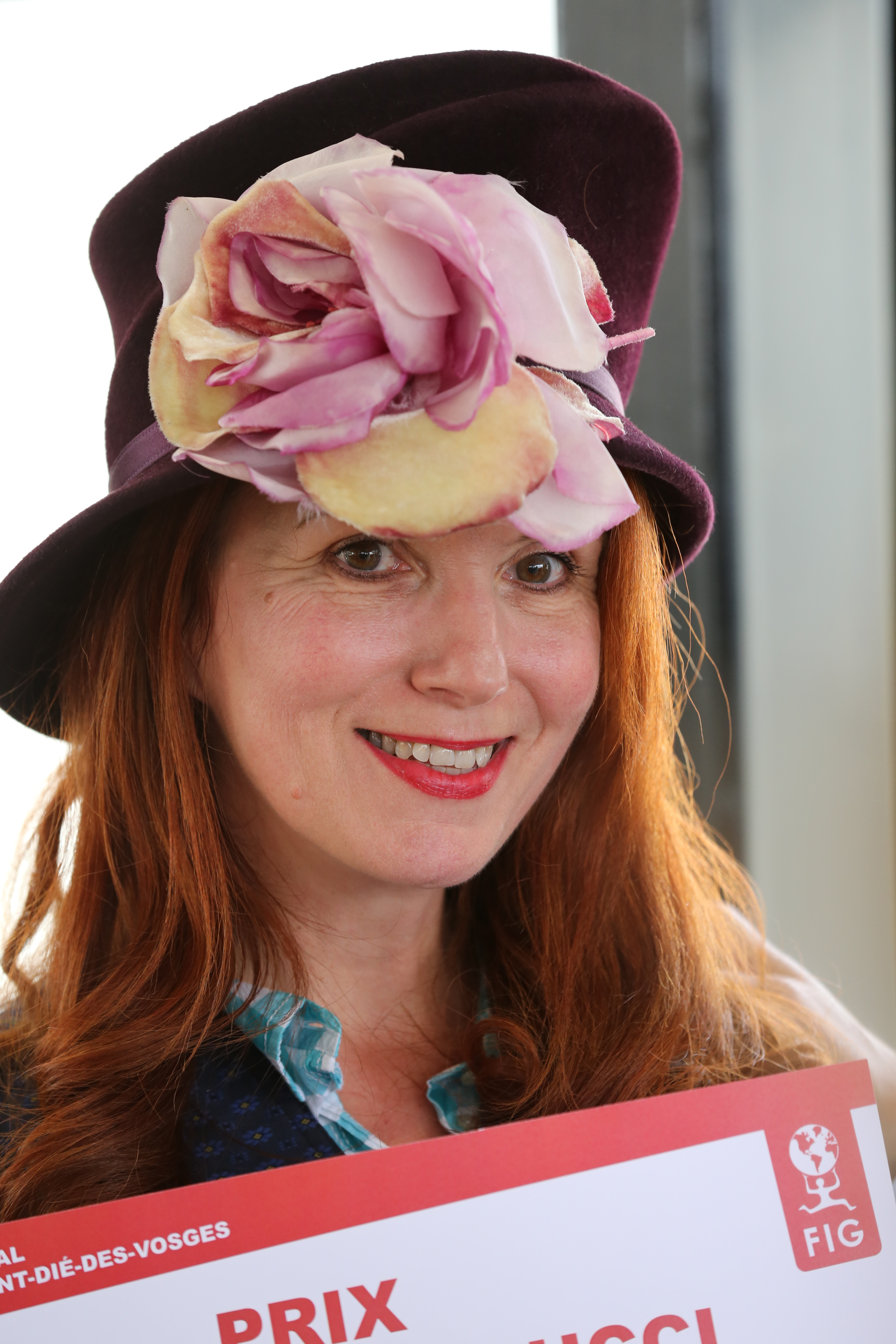
Nathalie Novi, co-laureate 2014 with Daniel Picouly

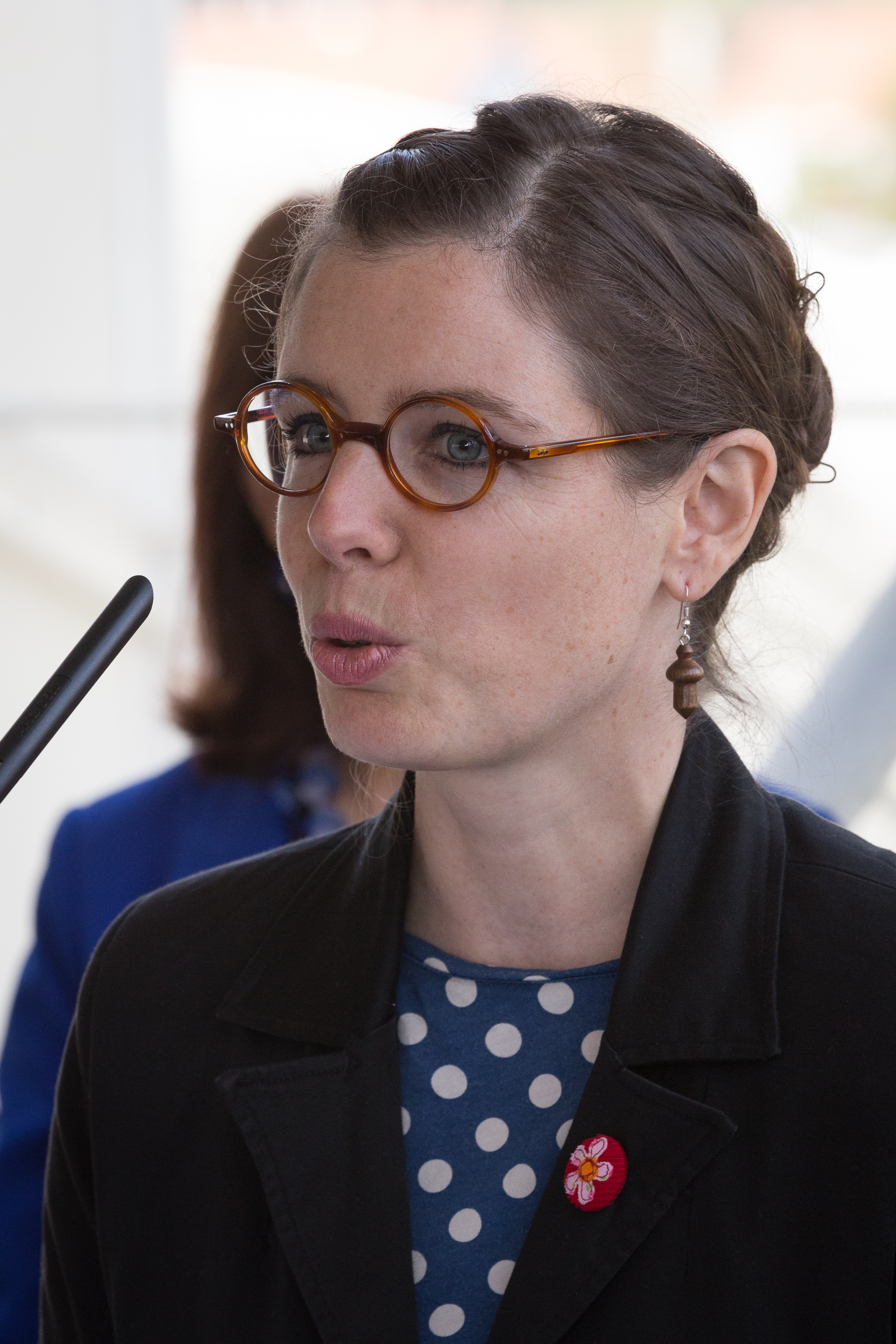
Fleur Daugey, co-laureate 2015

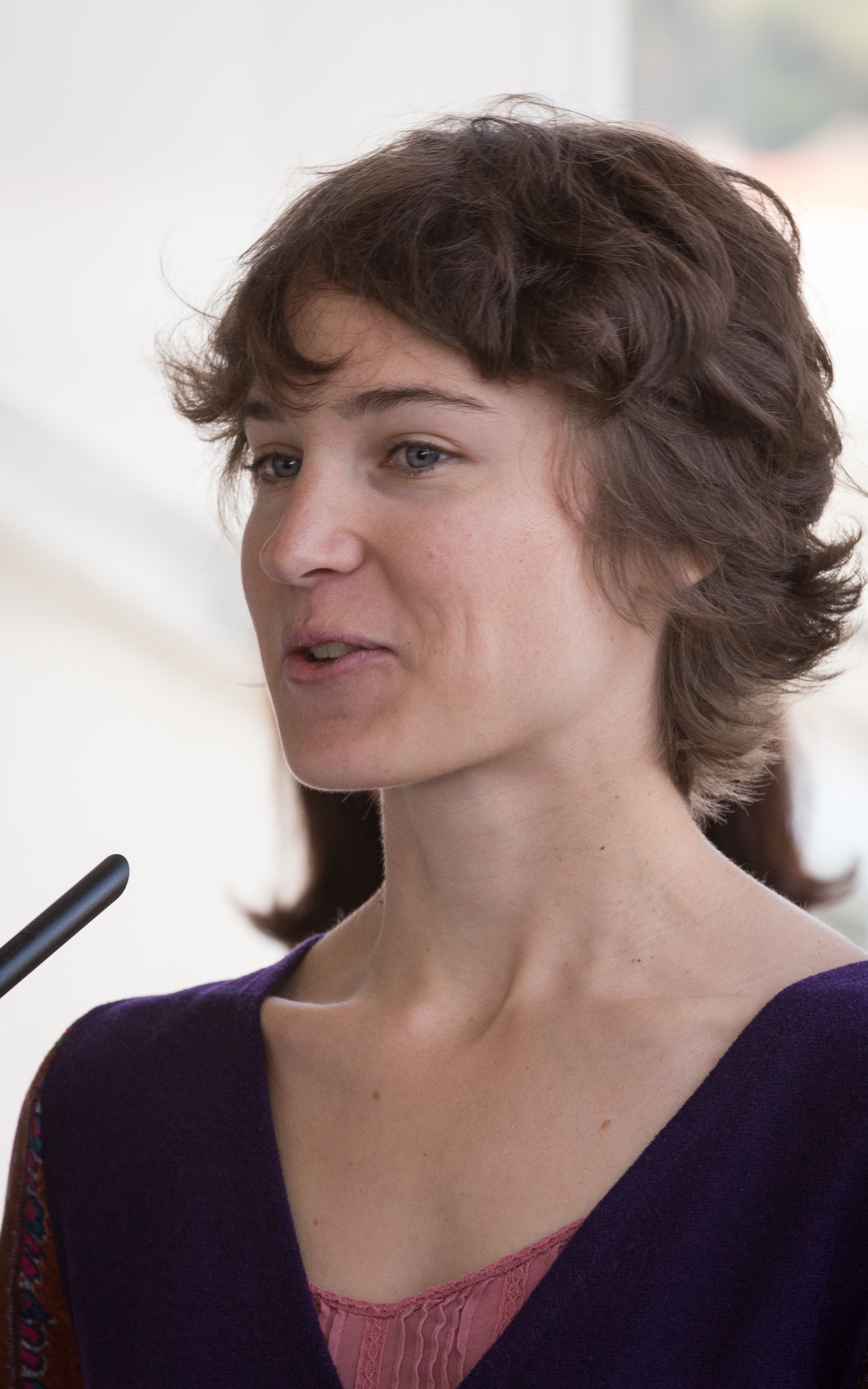
Sandrine Thommen, co-laureate 2015

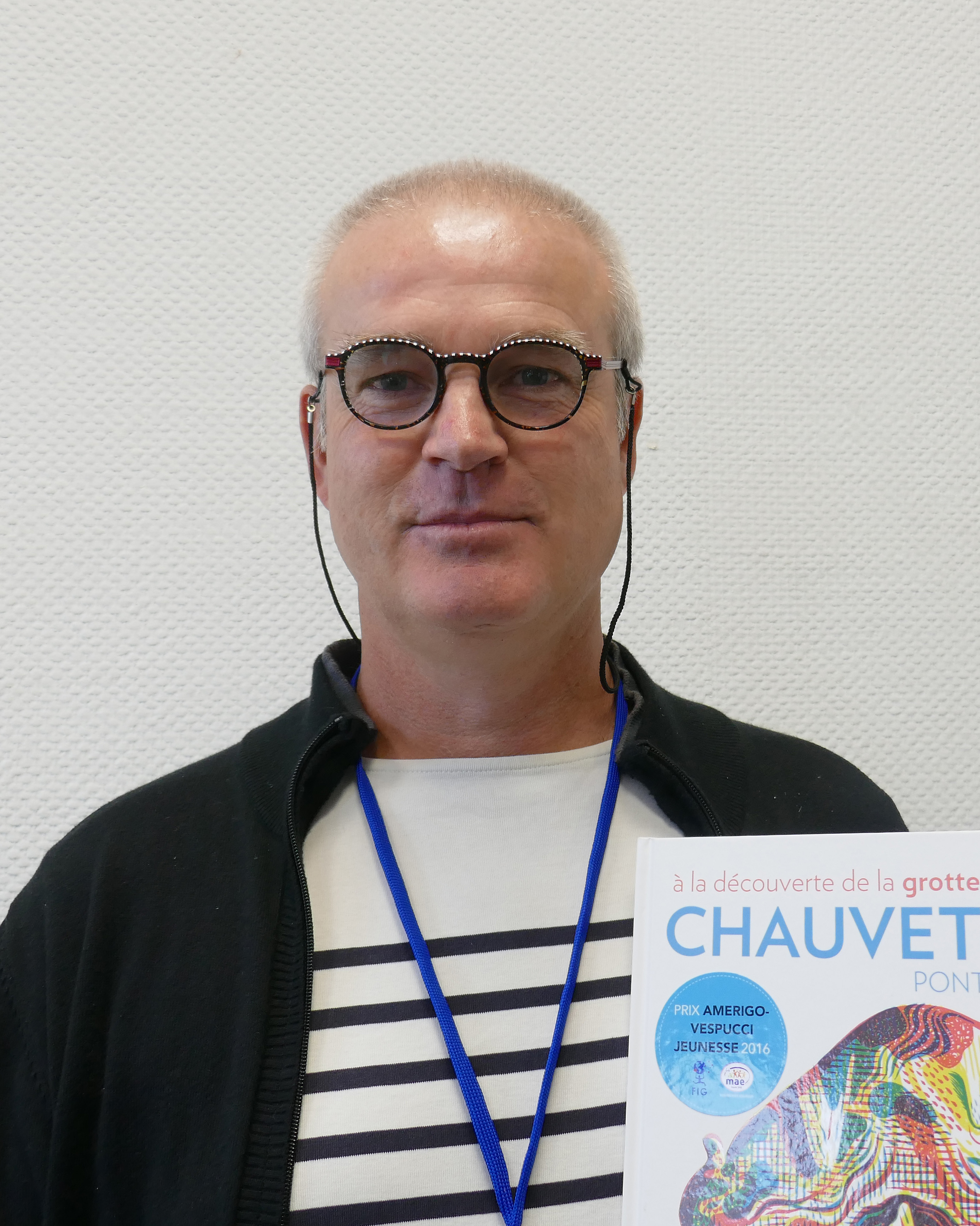
Sébastien Gayet, co-laureate 2016
