= Saint-Rémy-lès-Chevreuse =

- Commune
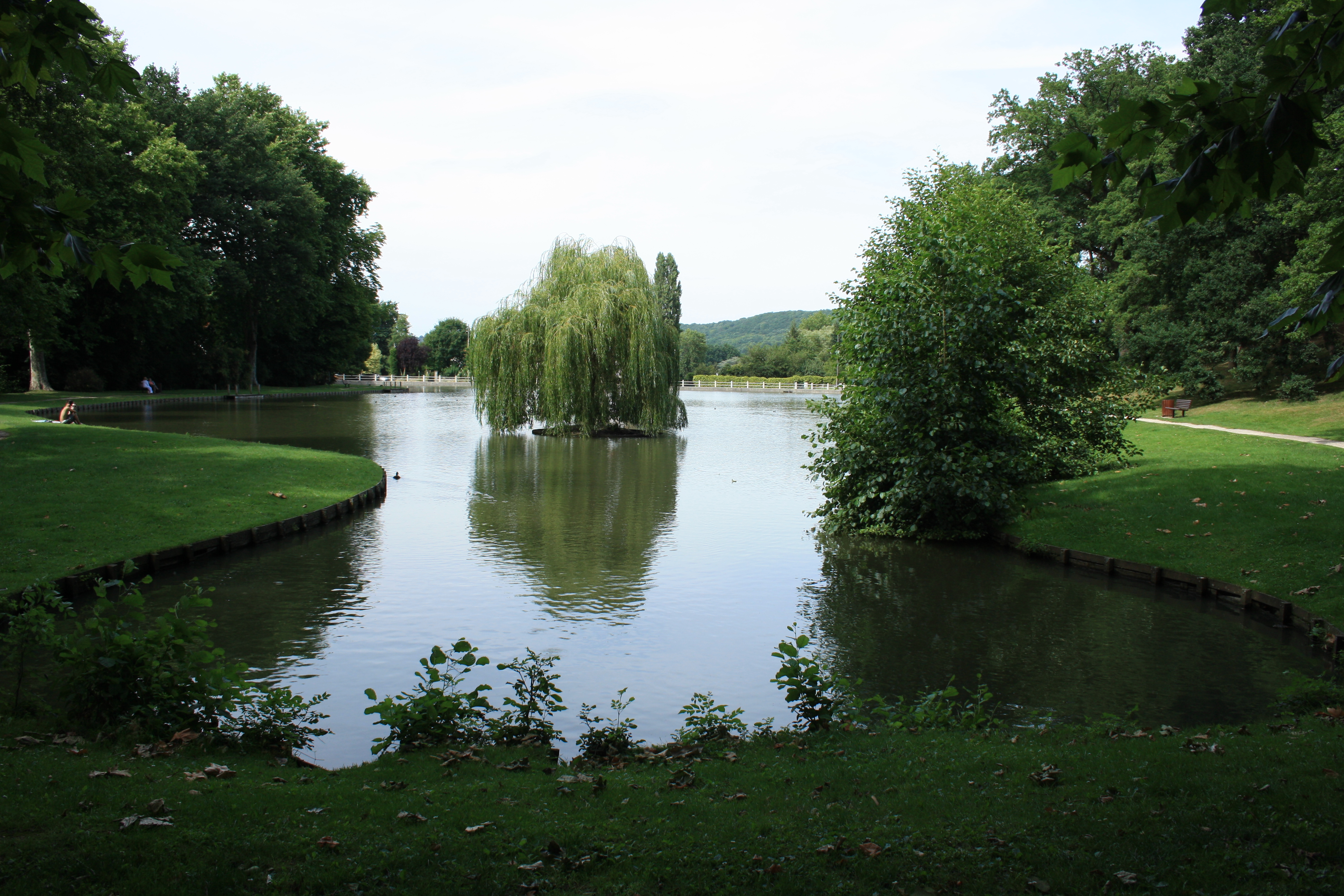
- Lake Beausejour in Saint Remy les Chevreuse
- Location of Saint-Rémy-lès-Chevreuse
- Location within France Location within Île-de-France (region)
- Coordinates: 48°42′23″N 2°04′21″E
- Country: France
- Region: Île-de-France
- Department: Yvelines
- Arrondissement: Rambouillet
- Canton: Maurepas

Government
  - Mayor (2020–2026): Dominique Bavoil
- Area^{1}: 9.65 km^{2} (3.73 sq mi)
- Elevation: 76 m (249 ft)
- Highest elevation: 169 m (554 ft)
- Lowest elevation: 66 m (217 ft)
- Population (2023): 7,747
  - Density: 803/km^{2} (2,080/sq mi)
- Time zone: UTC+01:00 (CET)
  - Summer (DST): UTC+02:00 (CEST)
- INSEE/Postal code: 78575 /78470
- ^{1} French Land Register data, which excludes lakes, ponds, glaciers > 1 km^{2} (0.386 sq mi or 247 acres) and river estuaries.

Saint-Rémy-lès-Chevreuse (French pronunciation: [sɛ̃ ʁemi lɛ ʃəvʁøz], lit. 'Saint-Rémy near Chevreuse') is a commune in the Yvelines department, in the Île-de-France region of north-central France.

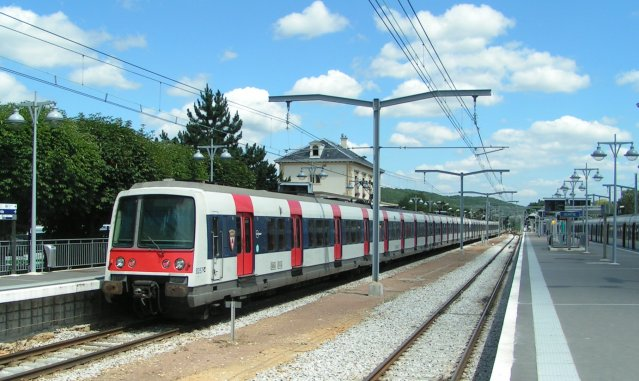
RER B line railway station

Saint-Rémy-lès-Chevreuse station is the southwestern endpoint of the RER B line from Paris.

== Population ==
Historical population
| Year | Pop. | ±% p.a. |
|---|---|---|
| 1968 | 3,488 | — |
| 1975 | 4,807 | +4.69% |
| 1982 | 5,221 | +1.19% |
| 1990 | 5,589 | +0.86% |
| 1999 | 7,651 | +3.55% |
| 2007 | 7,879 | +0.37% |
| 2012 | 7,730 | −0.38% |
| 2017 | 7,862 | +0.34% |
| 2023 | 7,747 | −0.25% |
Source: INSEE

== Education ==
Preschools include Jacques Liauzun and Saint Exupéry, and elementary schools include Jean Jaurès, Jean Moulin, and Jacques Liauzun. There are two area junior high schools, Pierre de Coubertin in Chevreuse and Hélène Boucher in Voisins-le-Bretonneux. The area senior high school/sixth form college is Lycée de la Vallée de Chevreuse in Gif-sur-Yvette.

== Notable people ==
- Pierre de Coubertin (1863–1937), cofounder of the International Olympic Committee, considered the father of the modern Olympic Games.
- Eugène Imbert (1821–1898), 19th-century chansonnier, died here
- André Wogenscky (1916–2004), French Modernist architect, and member of the Académie des beaux-arts.
- Marta Pan (1923–2008), French abstract sculptor of Hungarian origin.

== See also ==
- Communes of the Yvelines department
