= Jean-Paul Delfino =

French writer and screenwriter

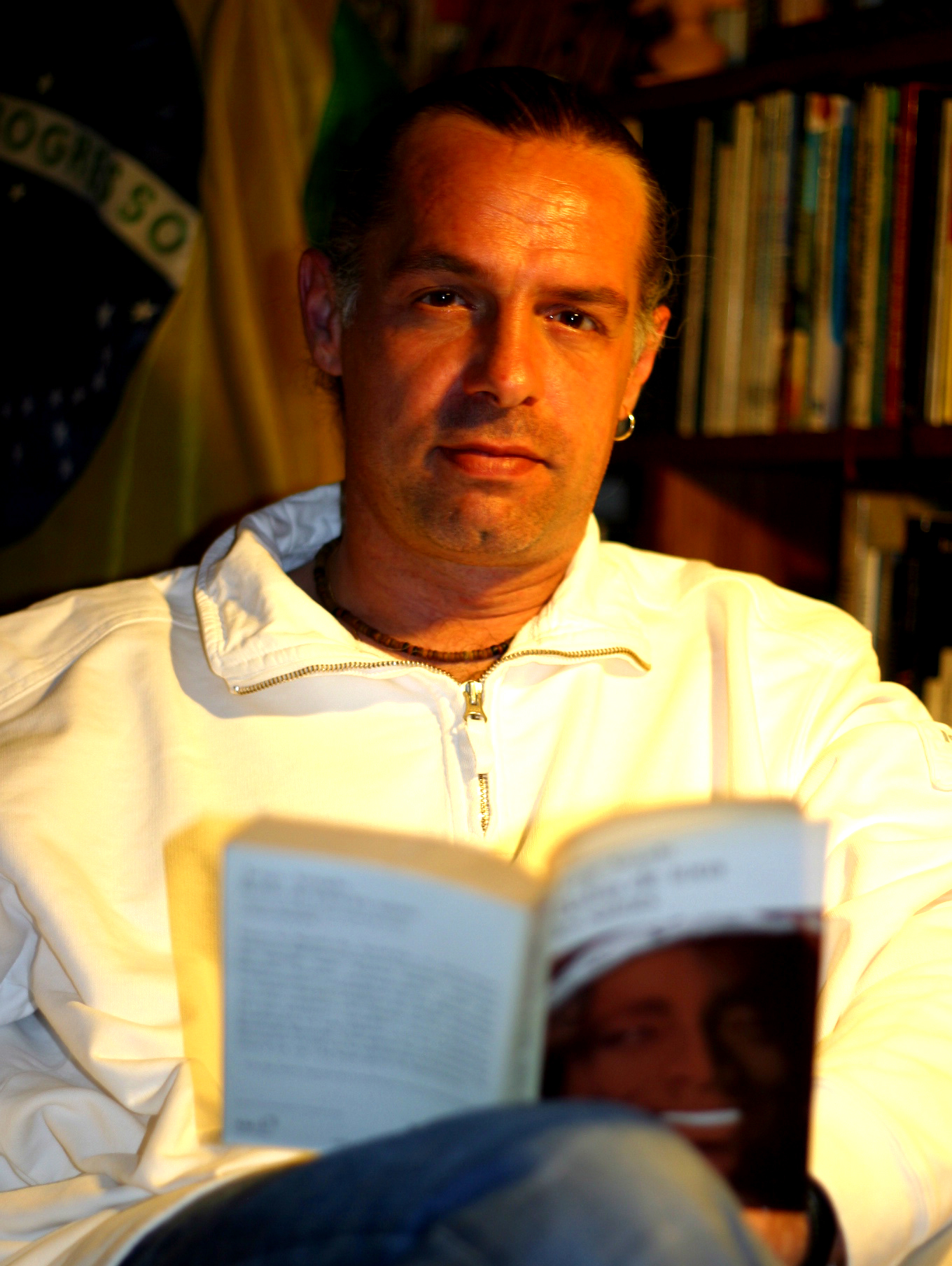
Jean-Paul Delfino in 2005

Jean-Paul Delfino (born 1 August 1964 in Aix-en-Provence) is a French writer and screenwriter.

== Bibliography ==
Literature

- 1999: L’Ile aux Femmes, Éditions Métailié Noir
- 2000: Tu touches pas à Marseille, Métailié Noir
- 2000: La Faction, Atout Éditions
- 2001: De l'eau dans le grisou, Métailié Noir
- 2001: Chair de Lune, Métailié Grand Format
- 2002: Embrouilles au Vélodrome, Métailié Noir
- 2002: Droit aux brutes, ADCAN-Vivendi Diffusion, (ISBN 2-951657-29-3)
- 2005: Corcovado, Métailié Hors collection – Prix Amerigo Vespucci of the Festival International de Géographie of Saint-Dié-des-Vosges – Prix Gabrielle d'Estrées of Chambray-lès-Tours
- 2006: Dans l’ombre du Condor, Métailié Hors collection
- 2007: Samba triste, Métailié Hors collection
- 2009: Zumbi, Buchet/Chastel
- 2011: Pour tout l'or du Brésil, Le Passage
- 2012: Pour l'amour de Rio, Le Passage
- 2013: Brasil, Le Passage
- 2014: Saudade, Le Passage
- 2015: 12, rue Carioca , Le Passage
- 2016: Les Pêcheurs d'étoiles, Le Passage

Collective

- 2002: Bleu, blanc, sang, éditions Fleuve Noir
- 2001: La fiesta dessoude, L’écailler du Sud
- 2003: Meurtres sur un plateau, L’écailler du Sud
- 2003: Le tacle et la plume, L’écailler du Sud
- 2005: Saudade, with Cédric Fabre and Gilles Del Pappas, CLC
- 2006:Va y avoir du sport !, Gallimard Jeunesse

Scripts and dialogues

- United Passions, by Frédéric Auburtin (Sélection officielle du Festival de Cannes 2014)

Documents

- 1988: Brasil Bossa Nova, Edisud, Grand Prix du Label France Brésil – Foreword by Georges Moustaki
- 1998: Brasil : a musica, 1st anthology of Brazilian folk music in Europe, Parenthèses
- 2014: Couleurs Brasil, 40 chronicles on popular Brazilian music, Le Passage, co-edition with Radio France

Youth

- 2001: Plus fort que les montagnes, Éditions L'Envol
- 2002: Gaïa, le peuple des Horucks, et tout ce qu’il advint…, Éditions L'Envol
- 2003: L’incroyable histoire de Momo-le-Mérou, Éditions L’Envol
- 2004: Mais où est passée Princesse Lulu ?, CLC Éditions
- 2006: Balduino, fils du Brésil, Éditions Pif Gadget
- 2023: René Maran, un homme (presque) comme les autres Éditions Orphie

Radioplays

- 2001: Le Triangle d'or, Radio France
- 2001: Enfants, les nouveaux esclaves du football, Radio France
- 2001: La mort après la vie, Radio France
- 2002: Des cadavres en cascade, Radio France
- 2002: De si gentils petits chats…, Radio France
- 2003: Le Fossoyeur des espérances, Radio France
- 2003: Bon appétit !, Radio France
- 2004: Un dernier, pour la route…, Radio France
- 2014: Couleurs Brasil, Radio France
