= Doan Bui =

French journalist

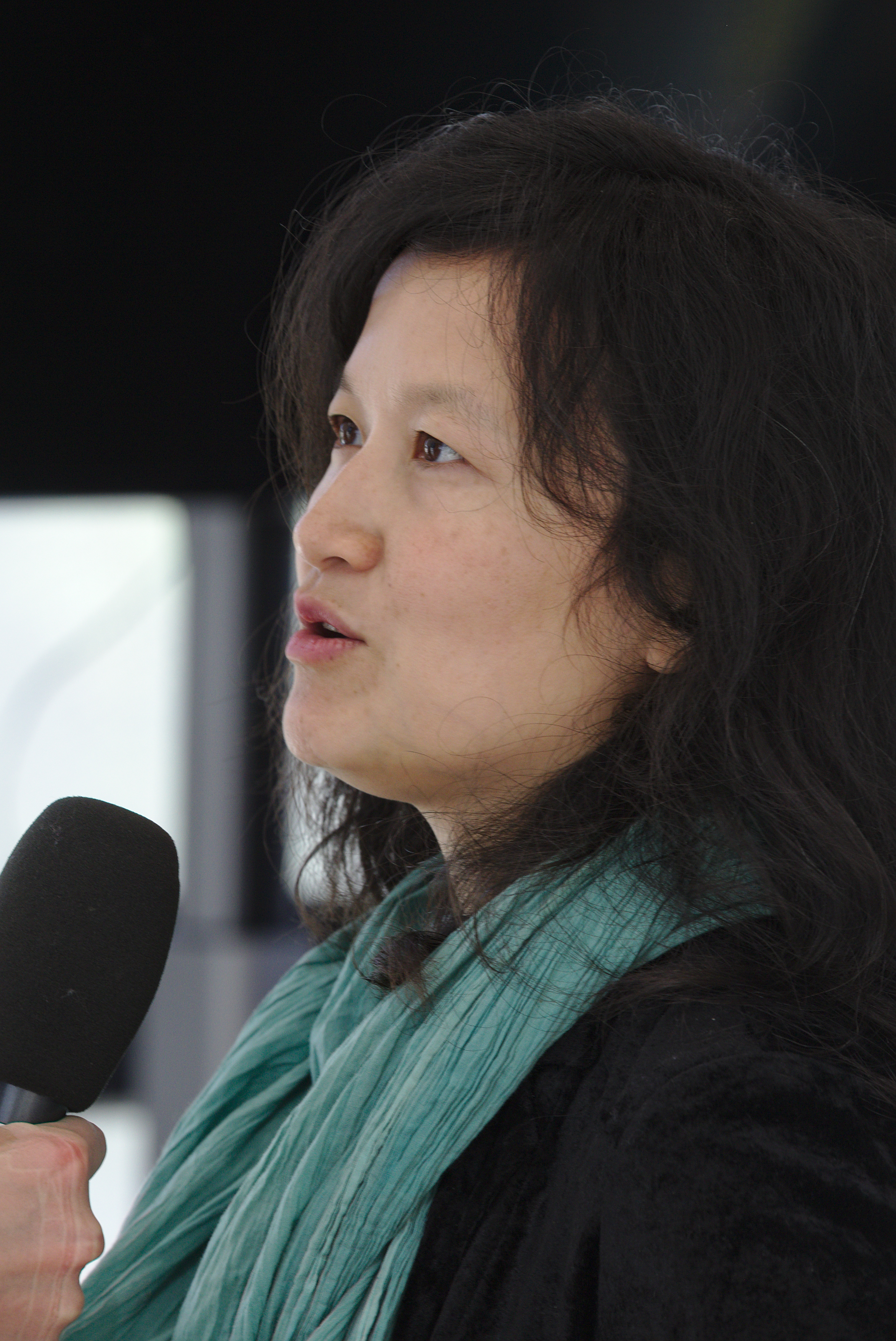
Doan Bui in 2016

Doan Bui is a French journalist born in Le Mans.

She received the prix Albert-Londres 2013 for her report Les Fantômes du fleuve on migrants trying to penetrate Europe in Greece through Turkey, published by Nouvel Observateur.

In 2016, she was awarded the prix Amerigo Vespucci for her work Le Silence de mon père (Éditions L'Iconoclaste).

== Publications ==
- 2002: Milliardaires d'un jour : Splendeurs et misères de la nouvelle économie, with Grégoire Biseau, Paris, Éditions Grasset and Fasquelle, 373 p. ISBN 978-2-246-62371-7
- 2009: Les Affameurs : voyage au cœur de la planète de la faim, Paris, Éditions Privé, 360 p. ISBN 978-2-35076-094-0
- 2010: Ils sont devenus français, with Isabelle Monnin, Paris, Éditions JC Lattès, series "Essais et documents", 303 p. ISBN 978-2-7096-3552-3
- 2011: Pour une terre solidaire, with Jean-Paul Rivière and all, Paris, éditions Le Cherche midi, 240 p. ISBN 978-2-7491-1978-6
- 2016: Le Silence de mon père, Paris, L'Iconoclaste, 272 p. ISBN 979-1-0954-3810-6
- 2022: La Tour, Paris, Grasset, 352 p. ISBN 978-2-2468-2499-2

== Television ==
- 2014–2015: Frères d'armes, historical TV serial by Rachid Bouchareb and Pascal Blanchard: presentation of zouave Daurière
