= Isabelle Jarry =

French writer and essayist (born 1959)

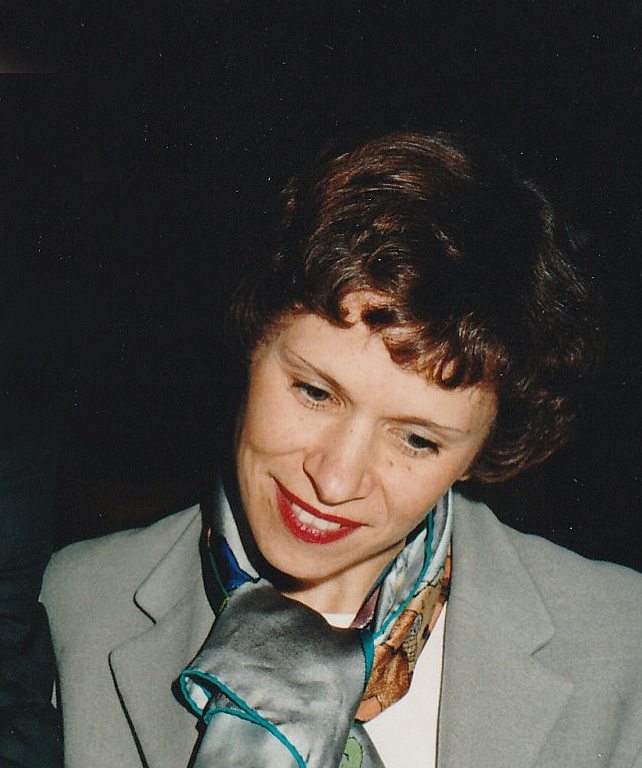
Isabelle Jarry-FIG 1995

Isabelle Jarry (born 2 October 1959 in Paris) is a French writer and essayist.

She is a member of the Board of Directors of the Maison des écrivains et de la littérature.

She is a chevalier of the Ordre des Arts et des Lettres.

== Works ==
- 1990: Théodore Monod, Paris, Plon, 239 p. ISBN 978-2259022002
- 1990: Mémoires d'un naturaliste voyageur, with Théodore Monod, icon. by Jean-Marc Durou, preface by Jean Rouch, Marseille, Éditions AGEP, series "Mémoires d'aujourd'hui", 180 p. ISBN 978-2902634538
- 1991: Voyage au Ténéré, Paris, 200 p.ISBN 2-259-02388-6
- 1992: L'homme de la passerelle, Paris, Éditions du Seuil, series "Cadre Rouge", 185 p. ISBN 978-2020177832 Prix du Premier Roman 1992.
- 1990: L’Archange perdu, Éditions Mercure de France, series "Bleue", 345 p. ISBN 978-2715218918, Prix Anna de Noailles de l'Académie française (1995)
- 1993: William Wilson de 1983 à 1993, Paris, Comptoir général d'Édition, 221 p. ISBN 978-2213594545
- 1995: Vingt-trois lettres d'Amérique, Paris, Éditions Fayard, 221 p. ISBN 978-2213594545

- Prix Amerigo Vespucci 1995

- 1996: Emportez-moi sans me briser, Paris, Éditions Fayard, 312 p. ISBN 978-2213597058
- 1997: La Pluie des mangues. Histoires contemporaines du Cambodge, phot. by Yves Gellie, Paris, Éditions Marval, 180 p. ISBN 978-2862342283
- 1998: Au ciel les nuages. Hommage à Dominique Bagouet, Éditions Marval
- 1999: Le Jardin Yamata, Paris, Stock, 228 p. ISBN 978-2234051522
- 2000: Il était une fois... l'enfance, photographies du fonds Roger Viollet, Paris, Éditions Plume, 111 p. ISBN 978-2841101252
- 2002: Au Désert, Paris, éditions Éditions Desclée de Brouwer, 149 p. ISBN 978-2220051963
- 2003: George Orwell, cent ans d'anticipation, Stock, 216 p. ISBN 978-2234055704
- 2004: J’ai nom sans bruit, Stock, series "La Bleue", 210 p. ISBN 978-2234057050
- 2007: Millefeuille de onze ans, Stock, 230 p. ISBN 978-2234059399
- 2008: La Traversée du Désert, Stock, 240 p. ISBN 978-2234060319
- 2009: Contre mes seuls ennemis, Stock, 203 p. ISBN 978-2234063181
- 2011: La Voix des êtres aimés, Stock, series "La Bleue", 304 p. ISBN 978-2234062375
- 2015: Magique aujourd’hui, Éditions Gallimard, "Collection Blanche", 336 p. ISBN 978-2-07-014892-9

Youth literature

- 2004: Aglaé en Inde, with William Wilson, Paris, Jalan Publications, 40 p. ISBN 978-2849660089
- 2007: Balthazar au jardin, with William Wilson, Paris, Gallimard Jeunesse, series "Hors série Giboulée", 37 p. ISBN 978-2070610570
- 2008: Ma folle semaine avec Papyrus, ill. by Aurore Callias, Gallimard Jeunesse, series "Giboulées", 101 p. ISBN 978-2070616169
- 2011: Le Bal de la Saint-Valentin : Une aventure de Titus et Papyrus, ill. by Aurore Callias, Gallimard Jeunesse, series "Giboulées", 120 p. ISBN 978-2070631599
- 2011: Zqwick le robot : Une aventure de Titus et Papyrus, ill. d'Aurore Callias, Gallimard Jeunesse, series "Hors série Giboulées", 108 p.

Pocket editions

- 1994: L’Homme de la passerelle, Points Seuil
- 1996: L’Archange perdu, Folio Gallimard
- 1998: Emportez-moi sans me briser, Le Livre de Poche
- 2001: Le Jardin Yamata, Le Livre de Poche
- 2006: J’ai nom sans bruit, Folio Gallimard
- 2008: Millefeuille de onze ans, Folio Gallimard
