= Grégoire Polet =

Belgian writer and poet

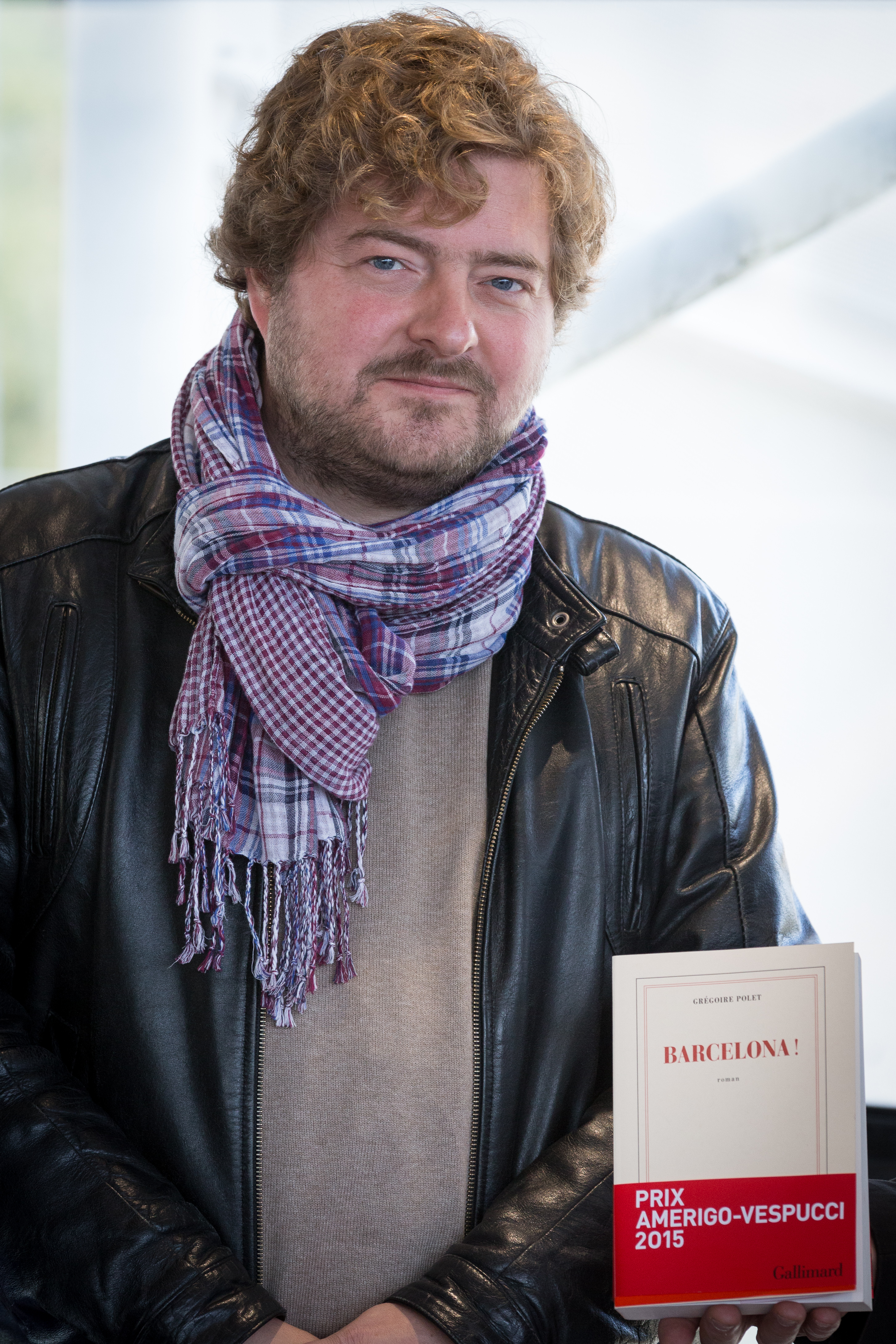
Grégoire Polet receives the prix Amerigo-Vespucci 4 October 2015

Grégoire Polet (15 April 1978, Uccle) is a Belgian writer and poet.

== Biography ==
Also a translator, Grégoire is a Doctor of Arts of the Université catholique de Louvain, specializing in Spanish literature. He is now a full-time writer and lives in Barcelona. For his inspiration he often found himself in the cities that concerned his history: when he wrote Madrid ne dort pas, his first book, he rented an apartment in Madrid. The same goes for Chucho whose action takes place in Barcelona.

At Lycée Martin V in Louvain-la-Neuve (Belgium), he was fellow with writer Jean-François Dauven. Their novels manifestly maintain close relations: often choral novels, written in the present of the indicative, very numerous and recurring characters from one book to another, always staged in urban areas (Paris, Rome, Brussels, Madrid, Prague, Barcelona, etc.), with a predilection for the representation of the simultaneity of destinies in an urban context.

== Works ==
=== Novels ===
- 2005: Madrid ne dort pas, Éditions Gallimard, prix Jean Muno 2005.
- 2006: Excusez les fautes du copiste, Gallimard, prix Victor-Rossel des jeunes 2006. Prix spécial Écrivain de la Fondation Jean-Luc Lagardère.
- 2008: Leurs vies éclatantes, Gallimard, prix Indications du jeune critique 2008 (ex aequo with Corinne Hoex, for Ma robe n'est pas froissée, éd. Les Impressions nouvelles). Prix Fénéon 2007. Prix Grand-Chosier 2007. Novel niminated in the first selection of prix Goncourt 2007.
- 2009: Chucho, Gallimard, prix Sander Pierron of the Académie royale de langue et de littérature françaises de Belgique.
- 2010: Petit éloge de la gourmandise, collection folio
- 2012: Les Ballons d'hélium, Gallimard
- 2015: Barcelona!, Gallimard, prix Amerigo-Vespucci at the Festival international de géographie.
- 2022: Petit éloge de la Belgique, Gallimard

=== Translations ===
- 2007: Juan Valera, Pepita Jiménez (Translation and foreword by Grégoire Polet), Geneva, Editions Zoé
