= Patrice Pluyette =

French writer (born 1977)

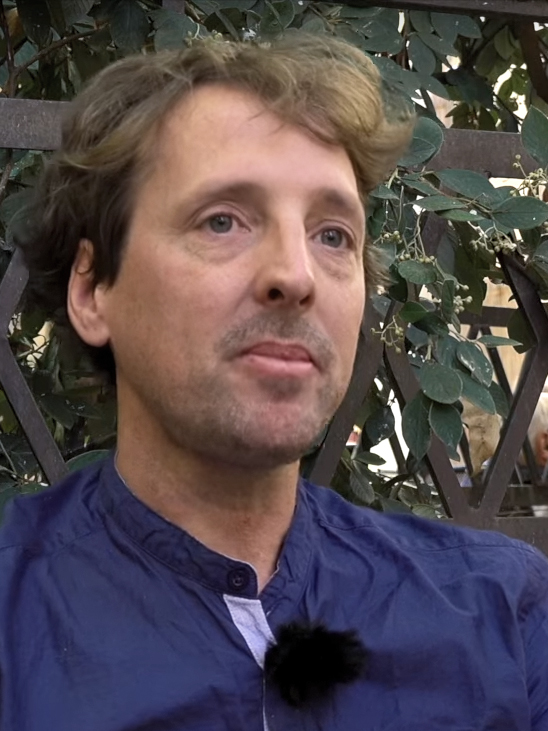
Patrice Pluyette (2018)

Patrice Pluyette (born 5 September 1977 in Chevreuse) is a French writer.

== Biography ==
After studying modern letters at the Sorbonne and a master's degree on Eugène Ionesco (Le Merveilleux dans l’œuvre théâtrale de Ionesco), Pluyette interrupted the competitions for teaching in 2002 and devoted himself to writing. In 2004, he chose to settle down by the sea in Morbihan.

After a collection of poetry published in 2001, Décidément rien (Éditions-Galerie Racine), he published two novels or narratives very favourably noticed at Maurice Nadeau: Les Béquilles (2004) and Un vigile (2005). He subsequently published three novels at Éditions du Seuil: Blanche (2006), La Traversée du Mozambique par temps calme (2008) nominated for the Prix Goncourt and the Prix Médicis, and Un été sur le Magnifique ( 2011).

In October 2008, the Festival international de géographie bestowed him the Prix Amerigo Vespucci for his novel La Traversée du Mozambique par temps calme.

In November 2008, he was awarded the Prix Pierre-Mac Orlan, chaired by Pierre Bergé, for the same novel.

In 2010-2011 Patrice Pluyette was resident at the Villa Médicis at Rome.

His latest novel, La fourmi assassine, was published on 8 January 2015 at éditions du Seuil. It was selected for the Grand prix RTL-Lire and the Prix Alexandre Vialatte.

== Works ==
=== Novels ===
- 2004: Les Béquilles, Éditions Maurice Nadeau, ISBN 286231188X
- 2005: Un vigile, Éditions Maurice Nadeau
- 2006: Blanche, Seuil, ISBN 2020871149
- 2008: La Traversée du Mozambique par temps calme, Seuil series Point, ISBN 2757814621
- 2011: Un été sur le Magnifique, Seuil, ISBN 9782020996761
- 2015: La Fourmi assassine, Seuil, ISBN 2021234002

=== Poetry ===
- 2001: Décidément Rien, Éditions-Galerie Racine
