= Château de la Madeleine =

Castle in Île-de-France, France

Coordinates: 48°42′36″N 2°2′31″E

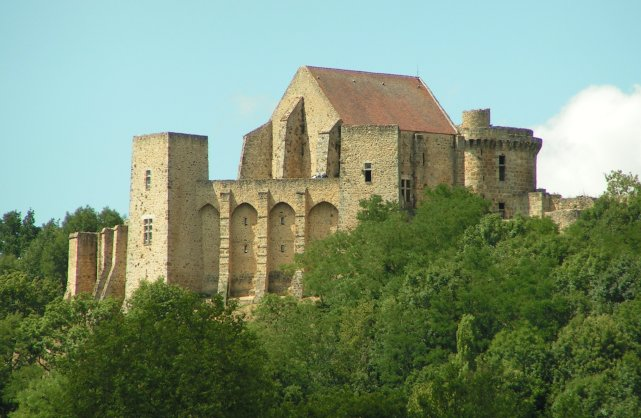

The Château de la Madeleine (French pronunciation: [ʃato də la madlɛn]) is a castle located in the town of Chevreuse, in the French département of Yvelines (Île de France). In a good state of preservation, it was built on the top of a hill and dominates the town.

The name comes from the chapel of the castle, dedicated to Sainte Marie-Madeleine.

== History ==
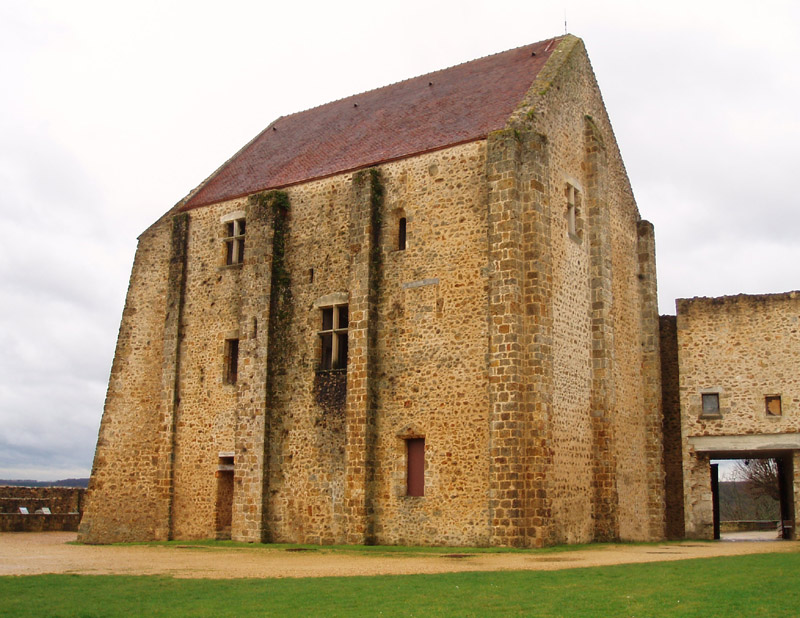
The keep

The construction of the Château de la Madeleine began between 1020 and 1090, under Guy I, lord of Chevreuse. The objective was to protect the village of Chevreuse against pillage. From this period, only the keep remains. At this time, the keep was surrounded by a wooden palisade; this palisade was replaced by stone curtain walls during the 12th century.

One century later, probably under the reign of Anseau de Chevreuse, the castle was modified, notably with the construction of the machicolations. The gatehouse was protected by a moat; the water was retained by a dam for domestic use.

The castles changed hands in 1356: Ingerger le Grand, lord of Chevreuse and Amboise, was taken prisoner by England during the Hundred Years' War. He was constrained to sell his domain to pay his ransom; the castle was bought by the future Pierre de Chevreuse.

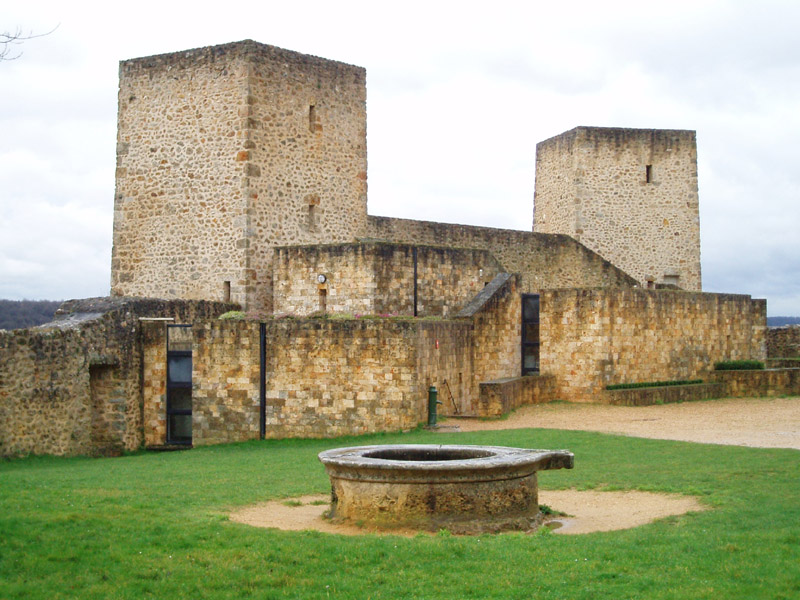
The well; the modern park headquarters is under the square towers

The existing fortifications were largely improved under the reigns of Charles V and Charles VI; they financed the outworks with royal taxes. The modifications were completed under Louis XI (1461 – 1483). Along with the castle, the village was also fortified: a crenelated rampart, 3.5 m (11 ft) high with turrets, was built. The defence was completed by a 15 m large ditch (50 feet).

Circa 1661, Jean Racine supervised modifications of the keep; his name was given to the road from the convent of Port-Royal to the center of the village, passing by the Château de la Madeleine. The keep was partially restored during the 19th century.

The last modifications were in the 20th century. The heart of the castle now houses the park headquarters for the regional natural park of the valley of Chevreuse (French: Parc naturel régional de la Haute Vallée de Chevreuse); the modern architecture is mixed with the square towers, and uses old rooms.

== Present state ==
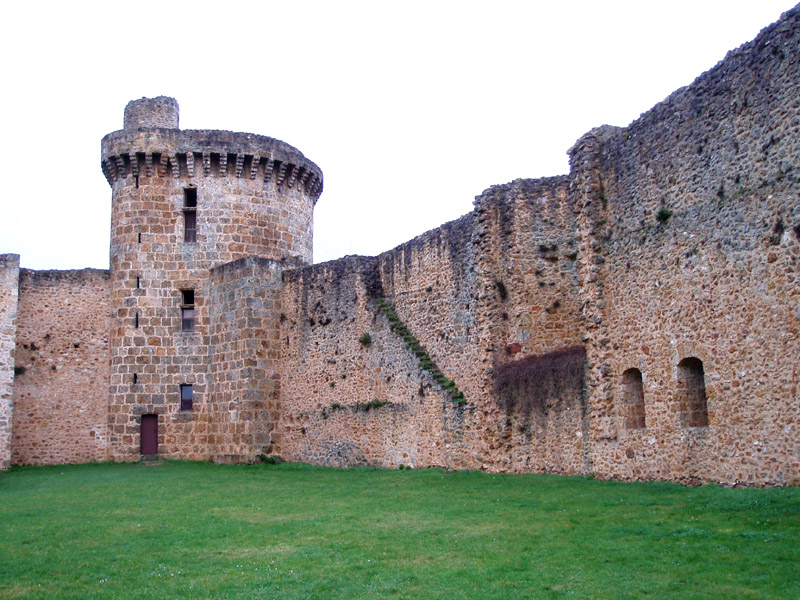
The tower of the guards

The intact parts are:

- the complete curtain wall with two square towers in the east, facing the village;
- the main door surrounded by two towers; the stone pediment collapsed and was replaced by a wooden lintel;
- two round towers; one is semicircular, the other is surmounted by a turret for watching;
- the keep, having small openings from the 11th century on one side, and windows from the 15th century on the other front;
- a well (15th century)
- machicolations, on the top of the ramparts.

The castle is open to the public for free. A few rooms are accessible; an exhibition shows the history of the castle.

The Château de la Madeleine has been protected by the French Ministry of Culture as a monument historique since 1940.

== See also ==
- Duke of Chevreuse
- List of castles in France
