= Goguette =

Singing society in France and Belgium

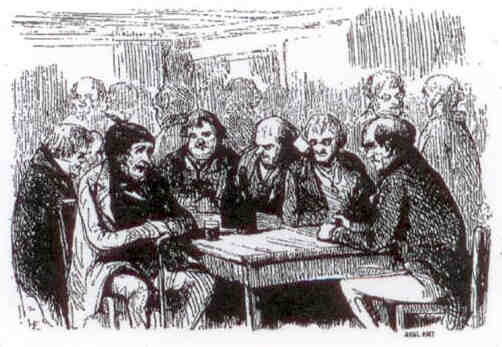
La Goguette des Joyeux, 1842

A goguette (French pronunciation: [ɡɔɡɛt]) was a singing society in France and Belgium, and its members were called goguettiers.

As well as providing venues for informal solo and ensemble singing, goguettes also served as places for drinking, socialising, and recreation.

Goguettes can trace their history back to 1729 and the Société du Caveau in Paris, founded by poet and chansonnier Pierre Gallet (1698–1757), but their heyday was in the years 1818 to 1900. They can still be found today.

In the early 19th century, goguettes met in the premises of cafés and restaurants, and provided a space for their members (for a small fee) to sing in public or to have their own compositions sung. Songs would explore well-worn epicurean themes such as drinking and eating, though political and social songs also played an important part.

Open to all social ranks, in practice they tended to attract literate men from the artisan class; they were also associated with revolutionary politics and were carefully monitored by the authorities.

A goguette tended to draw its members from the locality, and would have a formal structure of committee meetings, officials, minutes, etc., as well as social events. Membership was usually open to all – men, women and children, of any social class. Some tended to attract certain types like artists or intellectuals, such as the "Gnoufs-Gnoufs", "Poulet sauté" or "Frileux" in Paris.

Apart from Paris, goguettes could be found in many French provincial towns and cities (Bordeaux, Marseille, Rouen, Toulouse, etc.) as well as in rural areas.

The writer Gérard de Nerval describes a visit to a goguette in his 1852 short-story Les nuits d'Octobre. The narrator is moved by a young woman who sings with a purity and naivety which, he predicts, will be lost when she goes to the conservatoire to be classically trained.

== See also ==
- Café-chantant
- Eugène Imbert
- Guinguette
