= Eugène Imbert =

French writer and poet (1821–1898)

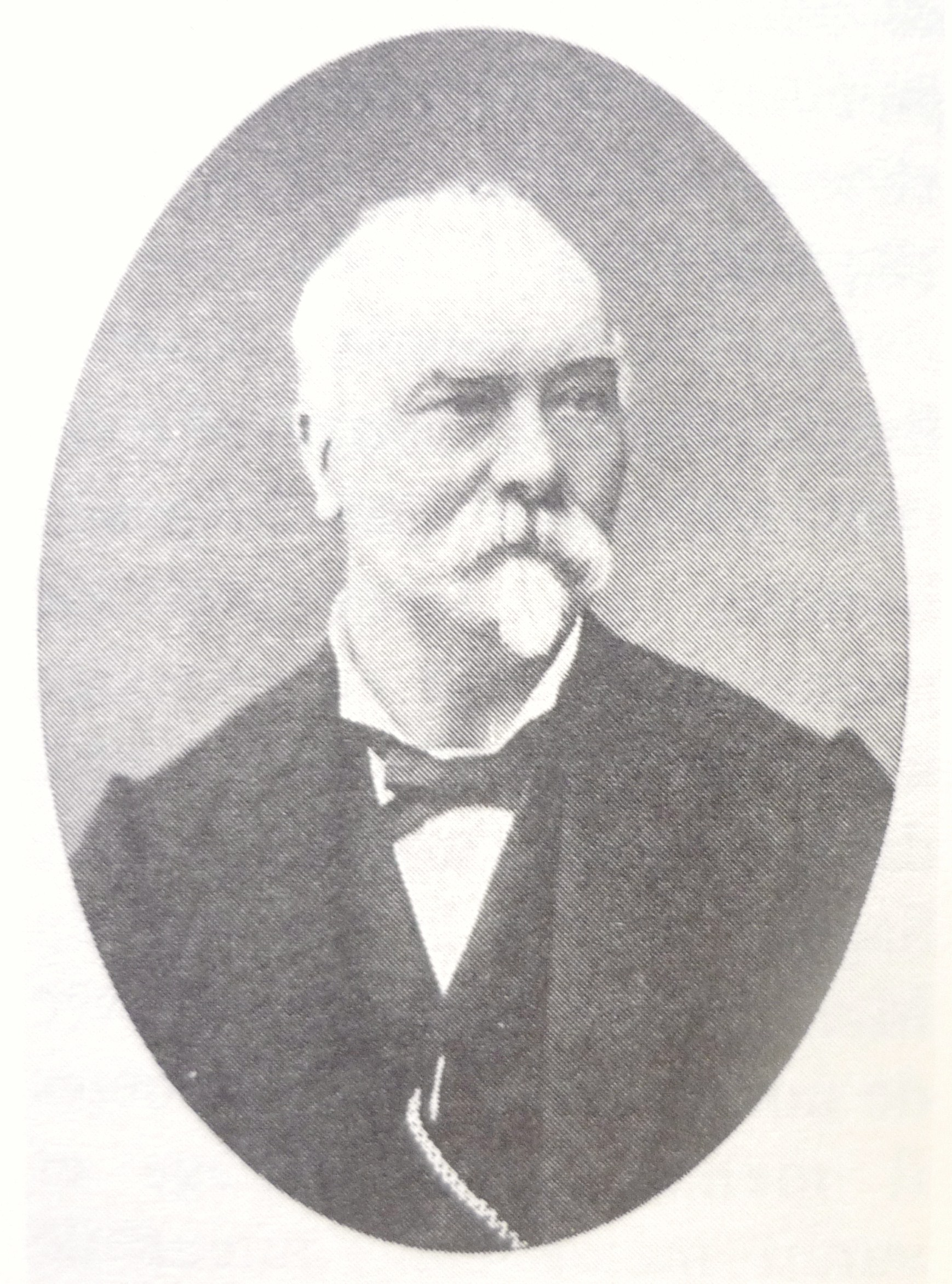
- Born: Eugène Alphonse Monet de Maubois; 14 March 1821; Paris
- Died: 1898 (aged 76–77); Saint-Rémy-lès-Chevreuse
- Occupations: Poet; Chansonnier; Historiographer

Eugène Alphonse Monet de Maubois, called Imbert, known in the world of the song in his time under the pseudonym Eugène Imbert (French pronunciation: [øʒɛn ɛ̃bɛʁ]), was a 19th-century French poet, chansonnier, goguettier and historiographer of the goguettes and songs.

== Some works ==
- 1866: La Chanson
- 1873: La Goguette et les goguettiers, Étude parisienne, 3rd edition, augmented 6 etched portraits by L. Bryois, in-8, 121 pages.
- 1875: Chansons choisies, Élégies parisiennes
