= Ingrid Thobois =

French novelist and development worker (born 1980)

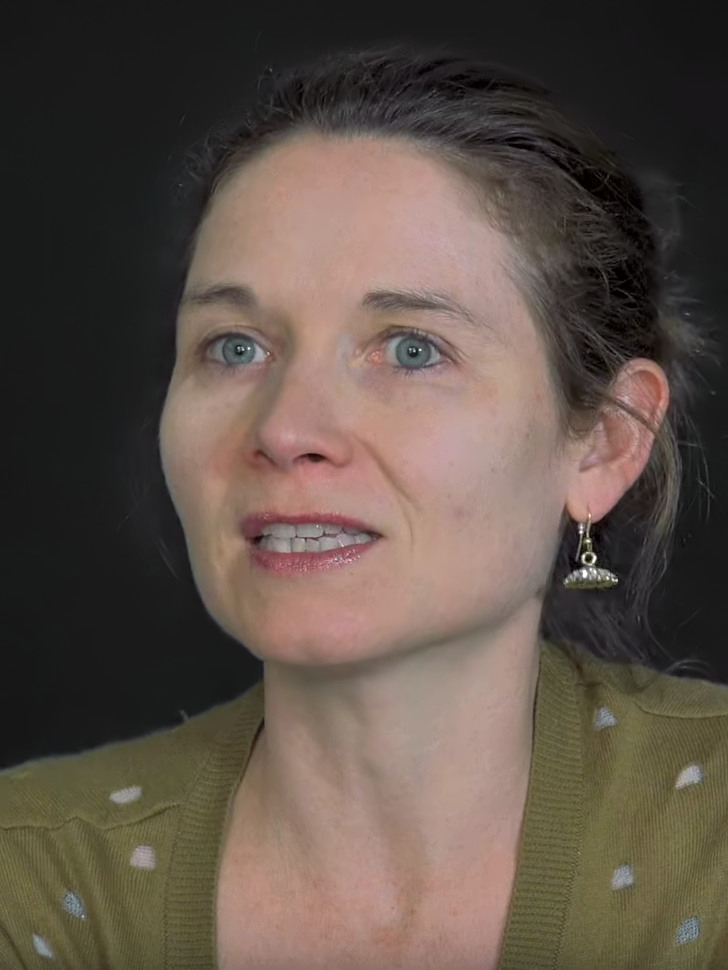
Ingrid Thobois (2018)

Ingrid Thobois is a French novelist and development worker. She was born in Rouen in 1980. She has worked extensively in Afghanistan as a language teacher, and has also taken part in missions in Indonesia, Congo, Moldavia, and Central Asia.

She has written two novels, both widely praised: Le roi d’Afghanistan ne nous a pas mariés and L’Ange anatomique (2008).
