= Hôtel de Ville, Gif-sur-Yvette =

Town hall in Gif-sur-Yvette, France

Hôtel de Ville
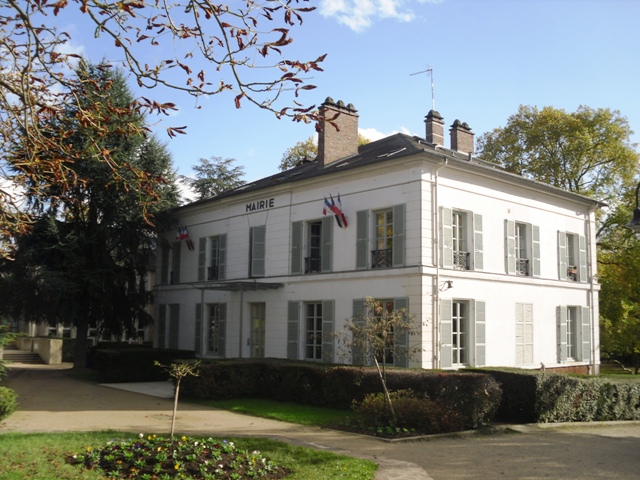
- The main frontage of the Hôtel de Ville in October 2009
- Interactive map of the Hôtel de Ville area

General information
- Type: City hall
- Architectural style: Empire style
- Location: Gif-sur-Yvette, France
- Coordinates: 48.7018°N 2.1339°E
- Completed: c.1835

The Hôtel de Ville (French pronunciation: [otɛl də vil], City Hall) is a municipal building in Gif-sur-Yvette, Essonne, in the southwestern suburbs of Paris, standing on Rue Henri Amodru.

== History ==
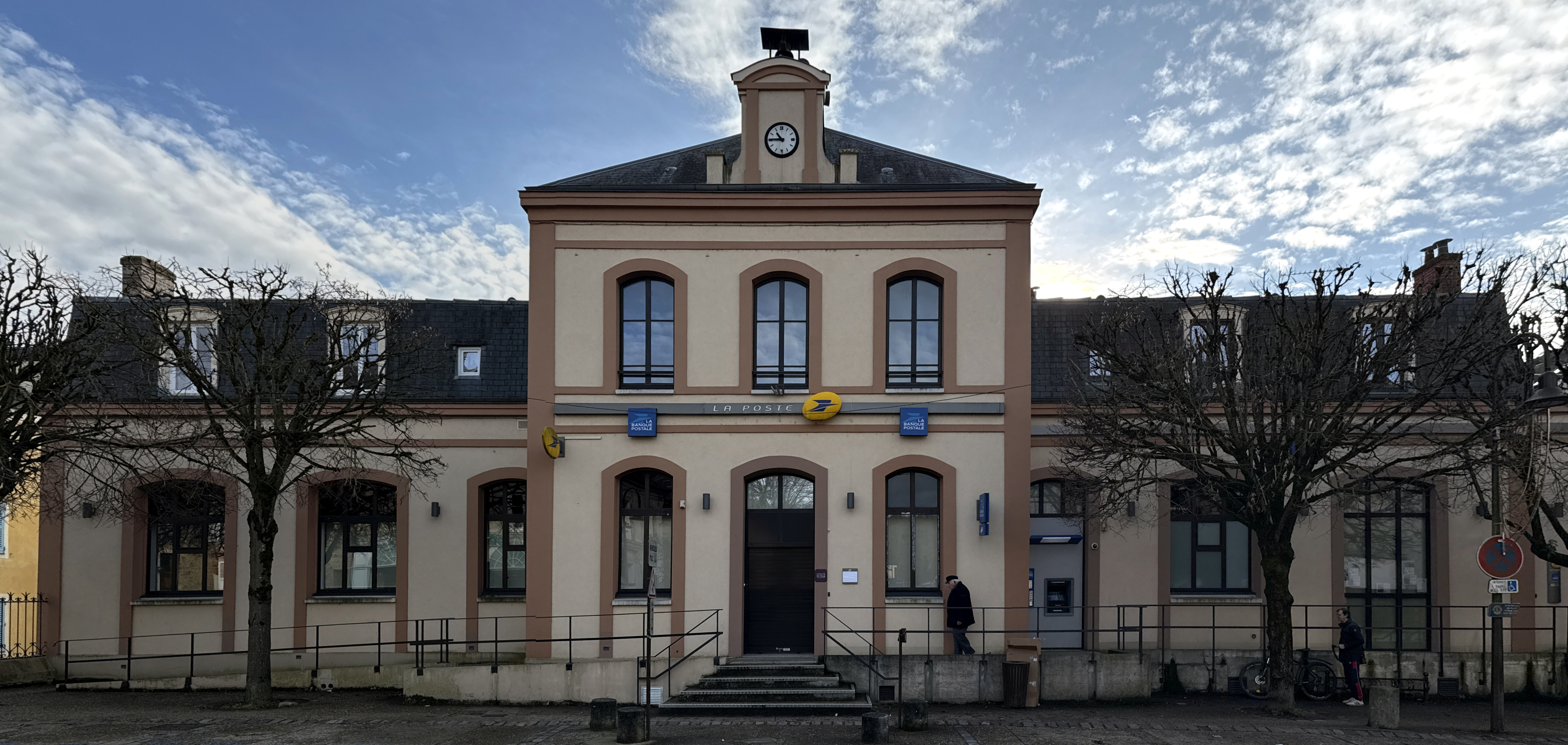
The old town hall

=== The old town hall ===
Following the French Revolution, the new town council initially met at the house of the mayor at the time. This arrangement continued until the mid-19th century when the council decided to commission a combined town hall and school. The site they selected was on the south side of what is now Rue Henri Amodru facing what is now Rue Émile Thuau. The building was designed in the neoclassical style and built in brick with a cement render finish. The complex was laid out as a two-storey main block with a pair of single-storey wings, although the wings also had dormer windows at attic level. The main block of three bays accommodated the council chamber, while the wings of three bays each accommodated the classrooms. It featured a short flight of steps leading up to a segmental-headed doorway and was fenestrated by segmental-headed windows. There was a clock above the central bay. When it was no longer required for municipal use, the building became the local post office.

=== The château ===
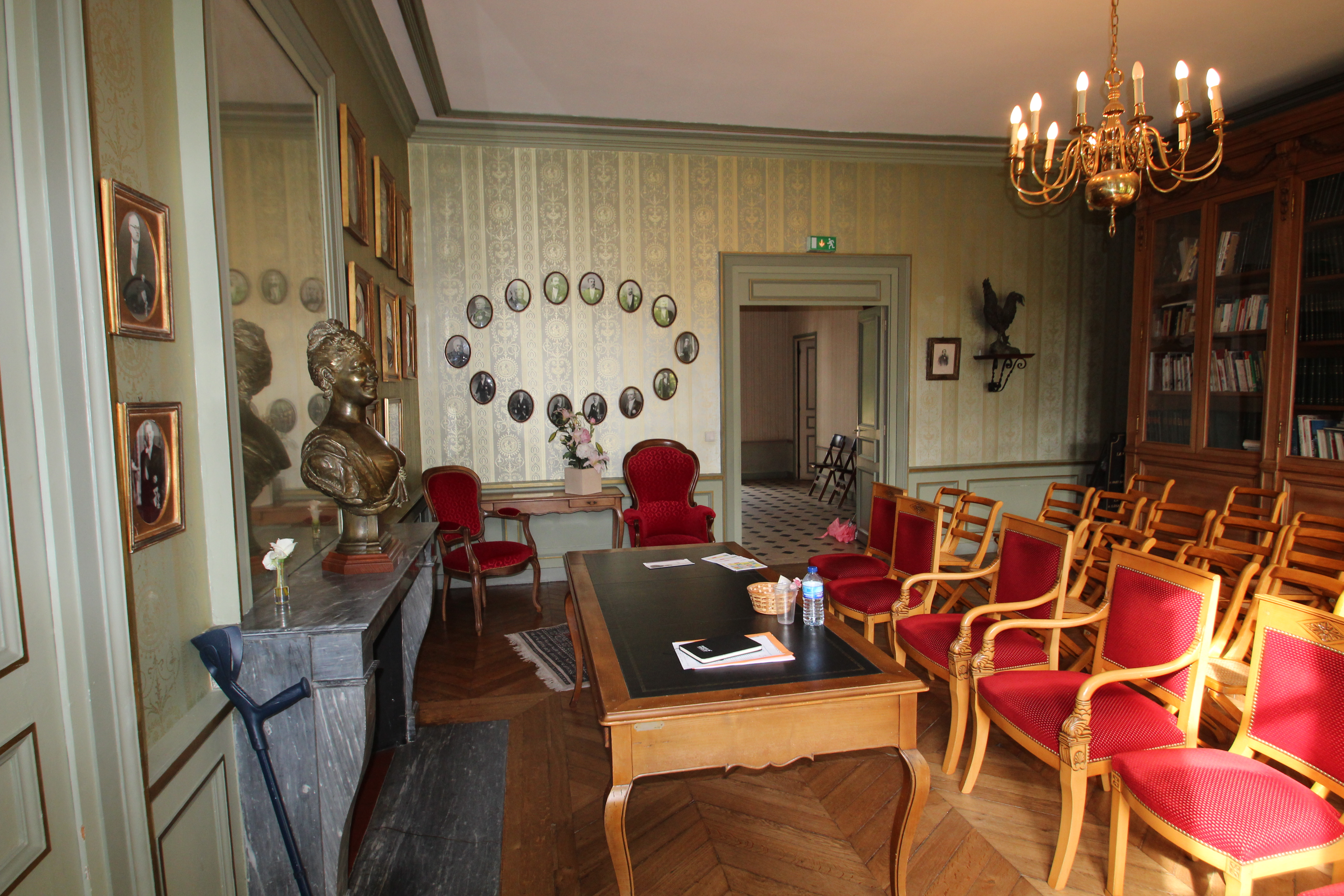
Inside the château

In the mid-1930s, following significant population growth, the town council led by the mayor, Arthur Levasseur, decided to acquire a more substation building. The building they selected was the Château de L'Ermitage, about 150 metres (490 ft) to the east of the old town hall on the south side of Rue Henri Amodru. The château had been commissioned by Napoleon's private secretary, Claude-François de Méneval, in 1831. It came with a large estate which stretched back to the River Yvette to the south and the River Mérantaise to the west. The château was designed in the Empire style, built in brick with a cement render finish and was completed around 1835.

The design involved a symmetrical main frontage of five bays facing onto Rue Henri Amodru. The central bay, which was slightly projected forward and faced in stone, featured a square-headed doorway on the ground floor and a tall casement window with shutters on the first floor. The other bays were fenestrated in a similar style. The rear elevation, facing onto the park behind, featured an additional two-bay floor at attic level. On the first floor, in the centre, there was a niche containing a statue and, at attic level, there was a circular recess containing a bust.

Following Méneval's death in 1850, the château passed to a distant relative, Louis-Théodore Débonnaire, who became mayor of the town. It was acquired by a Russian financier, Arthur Raffalovich, in 1889 and then, after Raffalovich's death in 1921, it was bought by a lingerie merchant. It was acquired shortly afterwards by Léon and Xavier Givaudan, who were the owners of the fragrances and flavouring business, Givaudan. After Léon died in 1936, the château became too expensive for Xavier to maintain, and he sold it to the council in 1938.

During the liberation of the town by the French 2nd Armoured Division, commanded by General Philippe Leclerc, on 24 August 1944, during the Second World War, armoured vehicles arrived from the north, travelling past Château de Button (now the CNRS), and arriving at the château. In 1984, a modern office building, intended to accommodate local municipal services, was erected on land immediately to the east of the château. A bust of the former member of the senate, Michel Pelchat, was created by the sculptor, Véronique d'Arcangues, and unveiled in the park behind the château in 2005.
