= Mérantaise =

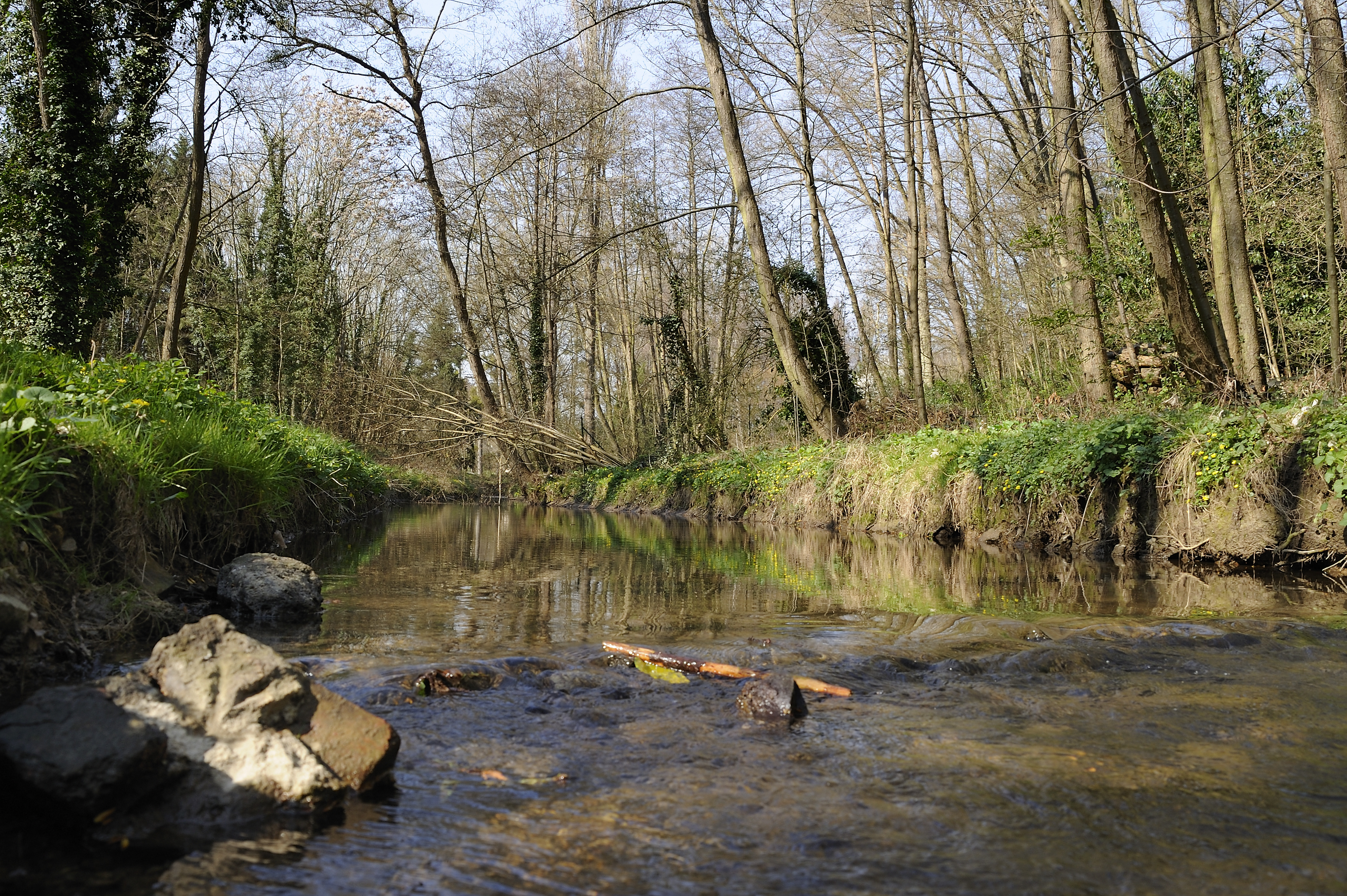

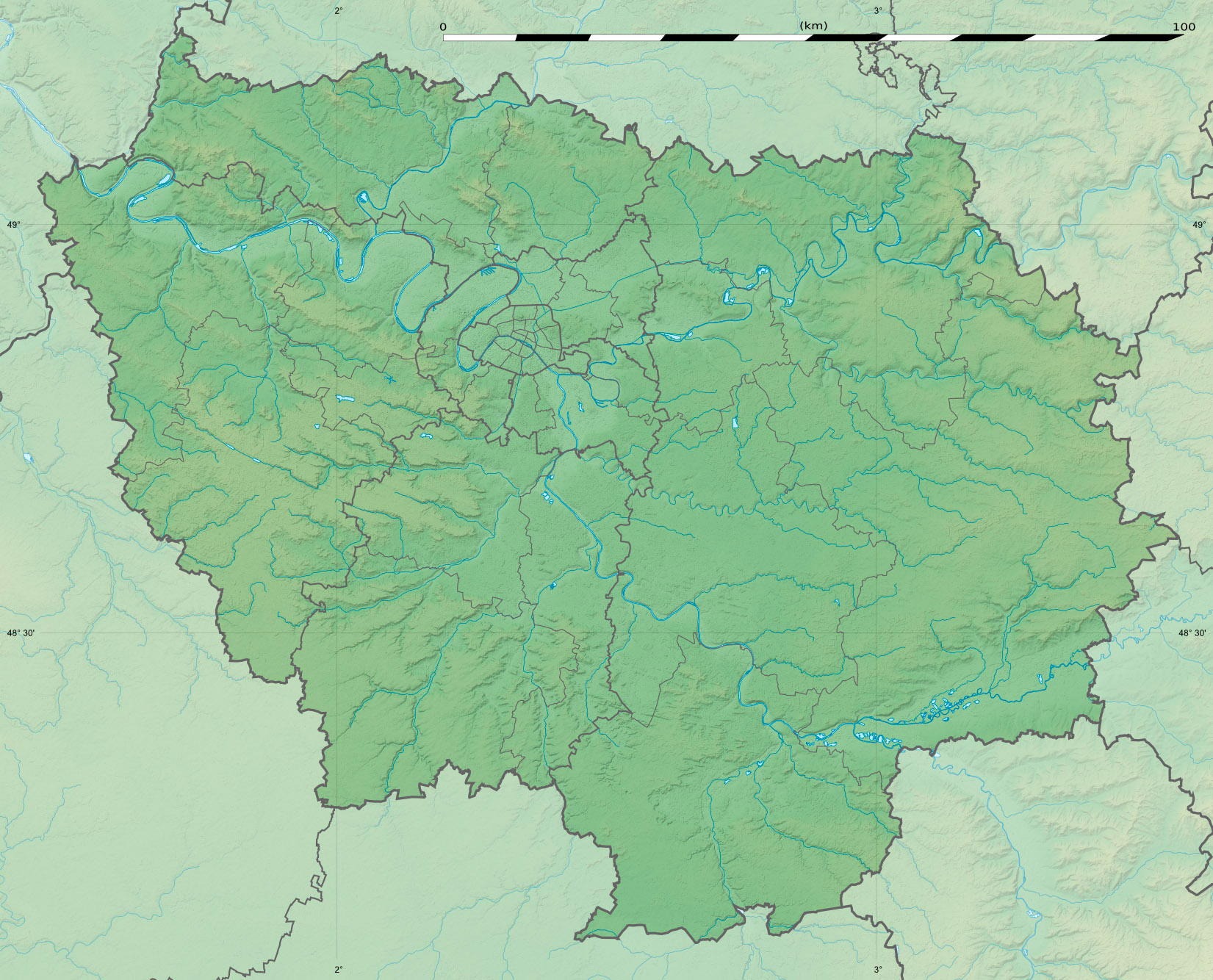
- Location within France Location within Île-de-France (region)

Location
- Country: France

Physical characteristics
- Source
  - coordinates: 48°45′38″N 2°0′44″E
- Mouth
  - location: Yvette
  - coordinates: 48°41′55″N 2°7′57″E
- Length: 14.3 km (8.9 mi)

Basin features
- Progression: Yvette→ Orge→ Seine→ English Channel

The Mérantaise (French pronunciation: [meʁɑ̃tɛz]) is a small river in southern Île-de-France (France), left tributary of the Yvette, which is a tributary of the Orge. It is 14.3 km (8.9 mi) long. Its source is in Voisins-le-Bretonneux, near Versailles, in the Yvelines department.

== Geography ==
The Yvette crosses the following départements and towns:

- Yvelines department : Voisins-le-Bretonneux, Magny-les-Hameaux,
- Essonne department : Saint-Aubin, Villiers-le-Bâcle, Gif-sur-Yvette
