= Gif-sur-Yvette station =

Railway station in Gif-sur-Yvette, France

Gif-sur-Yvette
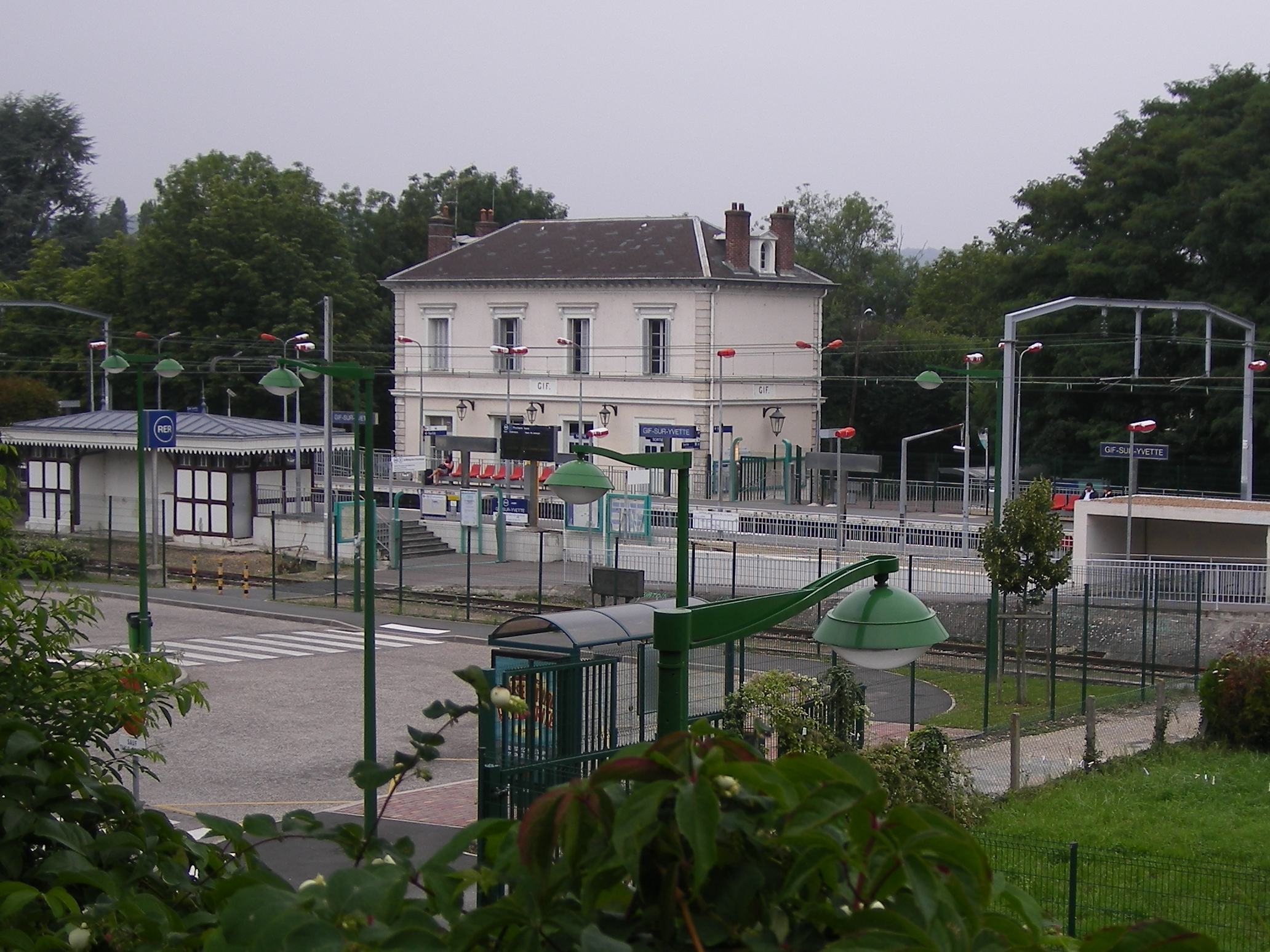
- Gif-sur-Yvette station

General information
- Location: Gif-sur-Yvette; France
- Coordinates: 48°41′54″N 2°8′12″E
- Operator: RATP Group
- Line: Ligne de Sceaux
- Platforms: 2 side platforms
- Tracks: 2

Construction
- Structure type: At-grade
- Accessible: Yes, by request to staff

Other information
- Station code: 87758870
- Fare zone: 5

Services
Preceding station	RER	Following station
La Hacquinière towards Aéroport Charles de Gaulle 2 TGV or Mitry–Claye	RER B	Courcelle-sur-Yvette towards Saint-Rémy-lès-Chevreuse
Location

Gif-sur-Yvette station (French: Gare de Gif-sur-Yvette) is an RER B station in Gif-sur-Yvette, near Paris, France. It is one of two stations in Gif-sur-Yvette, the other is Courcelle-sur-Yvette.

Freight traffic through Gif-sur-Yvette ended in 1972. An underpass was built in 1977 to connect the two platforms.

In 2008/2009, an elevator was constructed to allow disabled access.

== Connections ==
- Noctilien : N122
- SAVAC (bus) : Mobicaps n°10 & Mobicaps n°11
