= Vaularon =

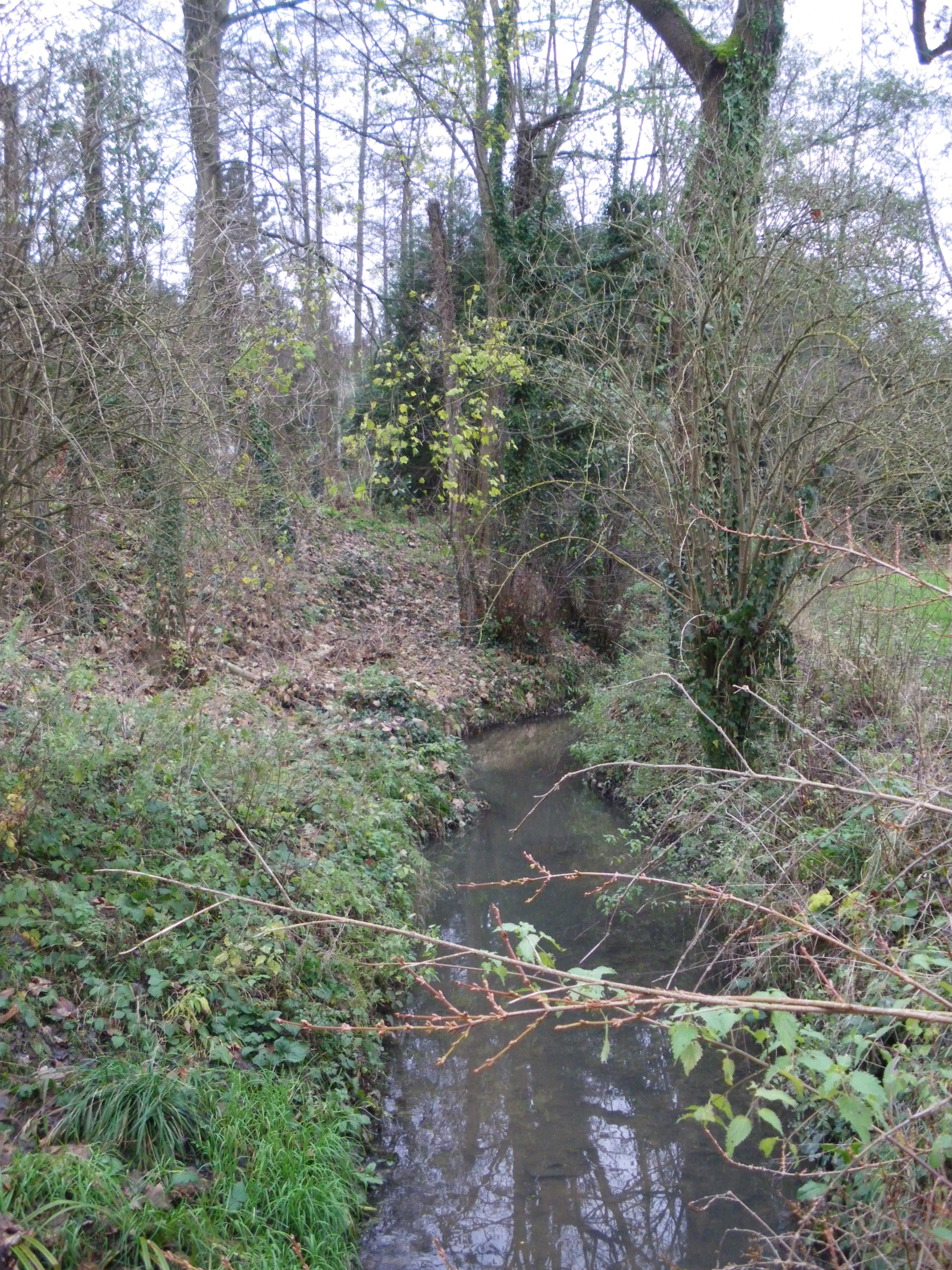
- Vaularon river downtown Bures-sur-Yvette

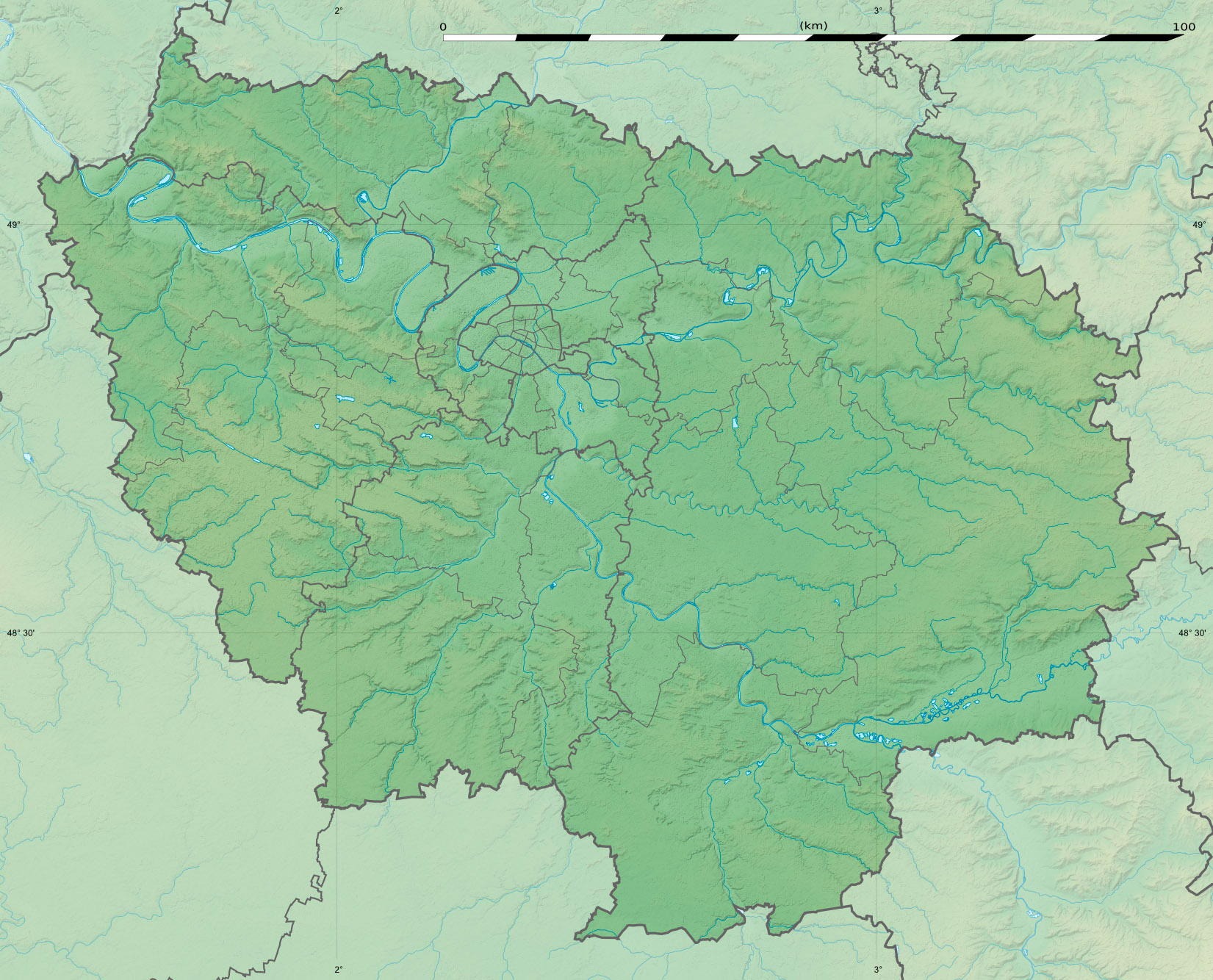
- Location within France Location within Île-de-France (region)

Location
- Country: France

Physical characteristics
- Mouth
  - location: Yvette
  - coordinates: 48°41′49″N 2°9′31″E
- Length: 3.8 km (2.4 mi)

Basin features
- Progression: Yvette→ Orge→ Seine→ English Channel

The Vaularon (French pronunciation: [volaʁɔ̃]) is a small river in southern Île-de-France (France), left tributary of the Yvette, in Bures-sur-Yvette, which is a tributary of the Orge and then the Seine. Its source is in Gometz-le-Chatel, in the Essonne department. It is 3.8 km (2.4 mi) long.
