= Rouillon (Yvette) =

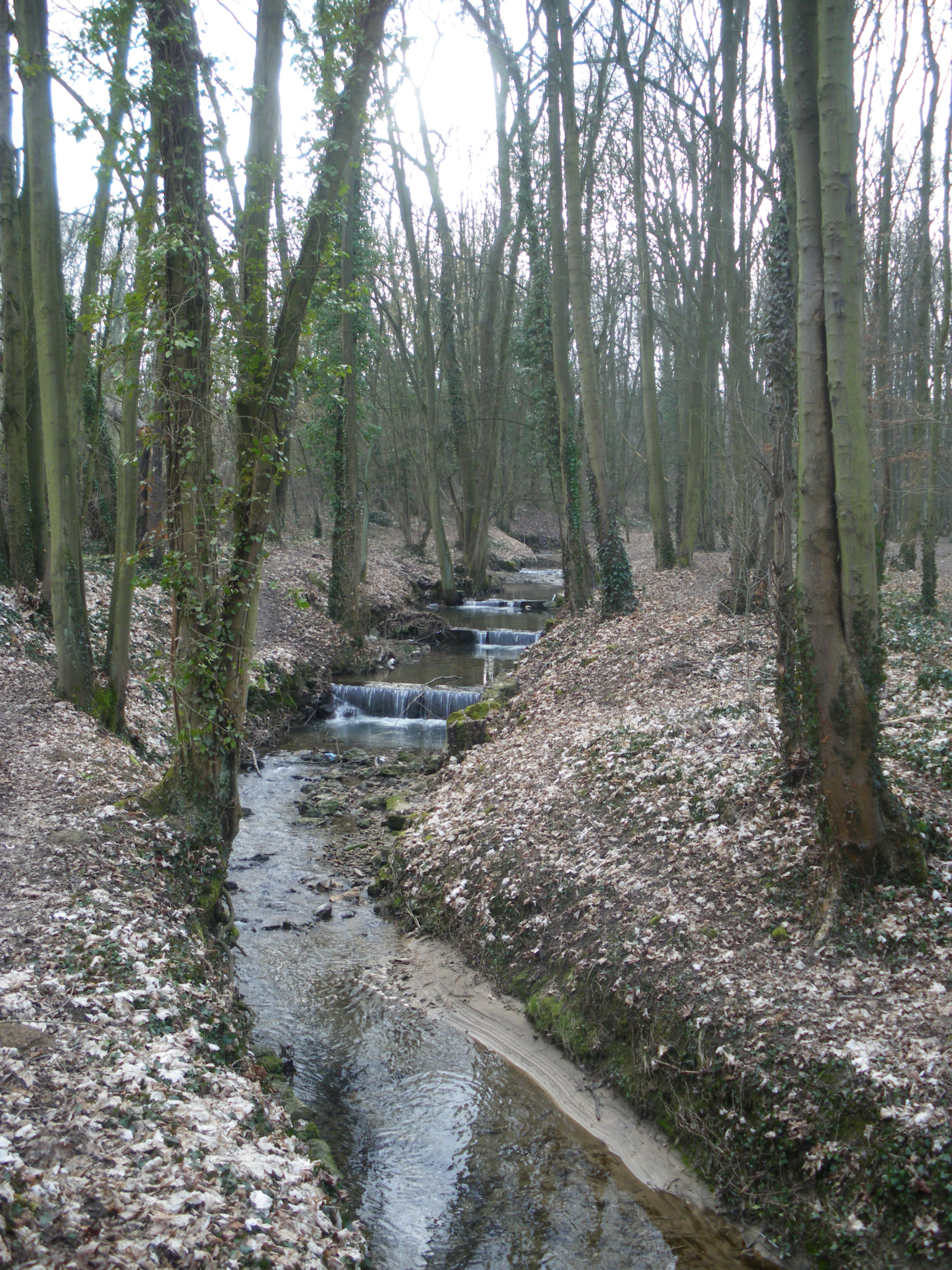
- Rouillon river near Longjumeau

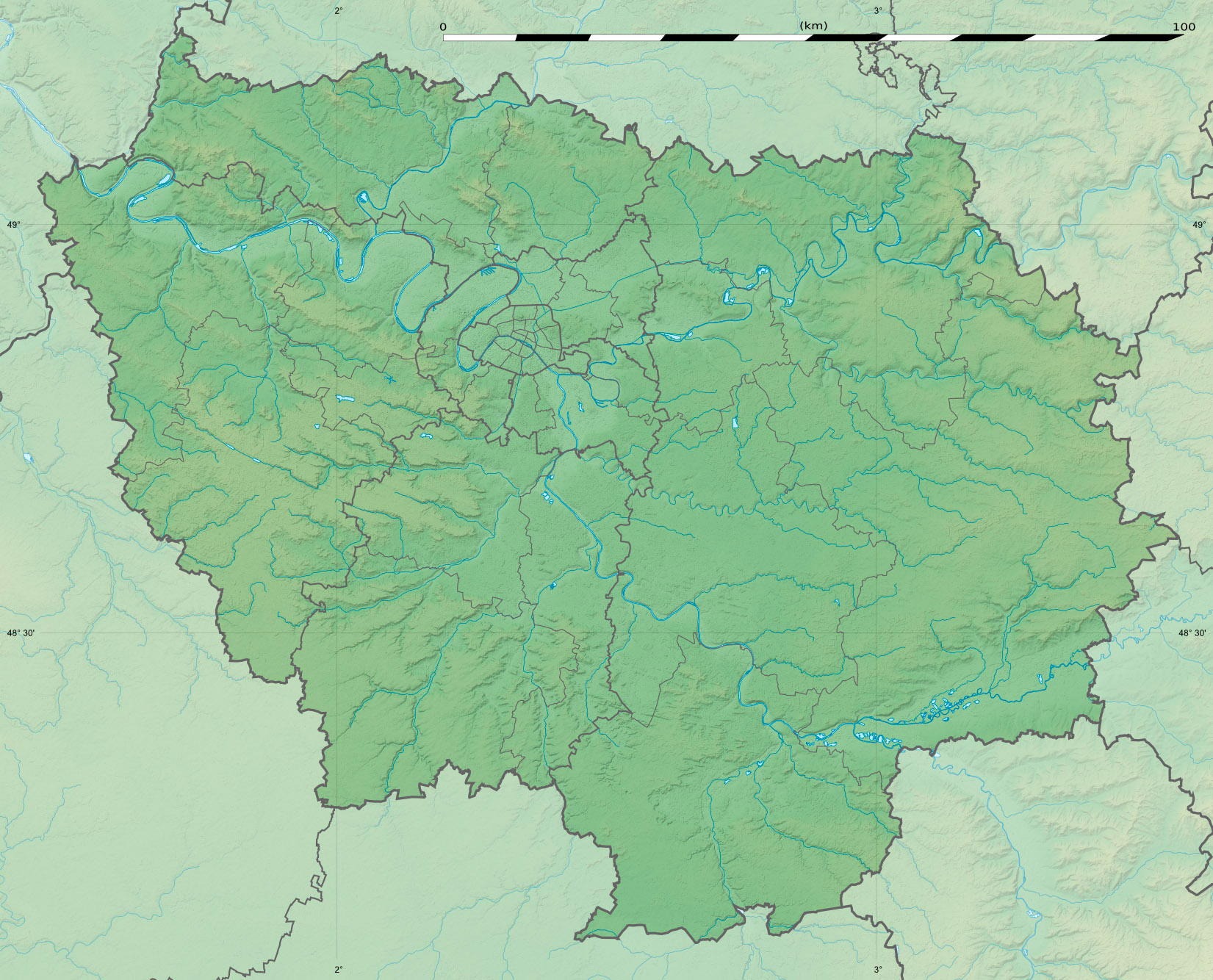
- Location within France Location within Île-de-France (region)

Location
- Country: France

Physical characteristics
- Source
  - coordinates: 48°40′47″N 2°12′42″E
- Mouth
  - location: Yvette
  - coordinates: 48°41′6″N 2°19′11″E
- Length: 9.5 km (5.9 mi)

Basin features
- Progression: Yvette→ Orge→ Seine→ English Channel

The Rouillon (French pronunciation: [ʁujɔ̃]) is a small river in southern Île-de-France (France), left tributary of the Yvette, which is a tributary of the Orge. Its source is in Villejust, north of Longjumeau, in the Essonne department. It is 9.5 km (5.9 mi) long.

The Rouillon crosses the following départements and towns:

- Essonne: Villejust, Saulx-les-Chartreux, Ballainvilliers, Longjumeau.

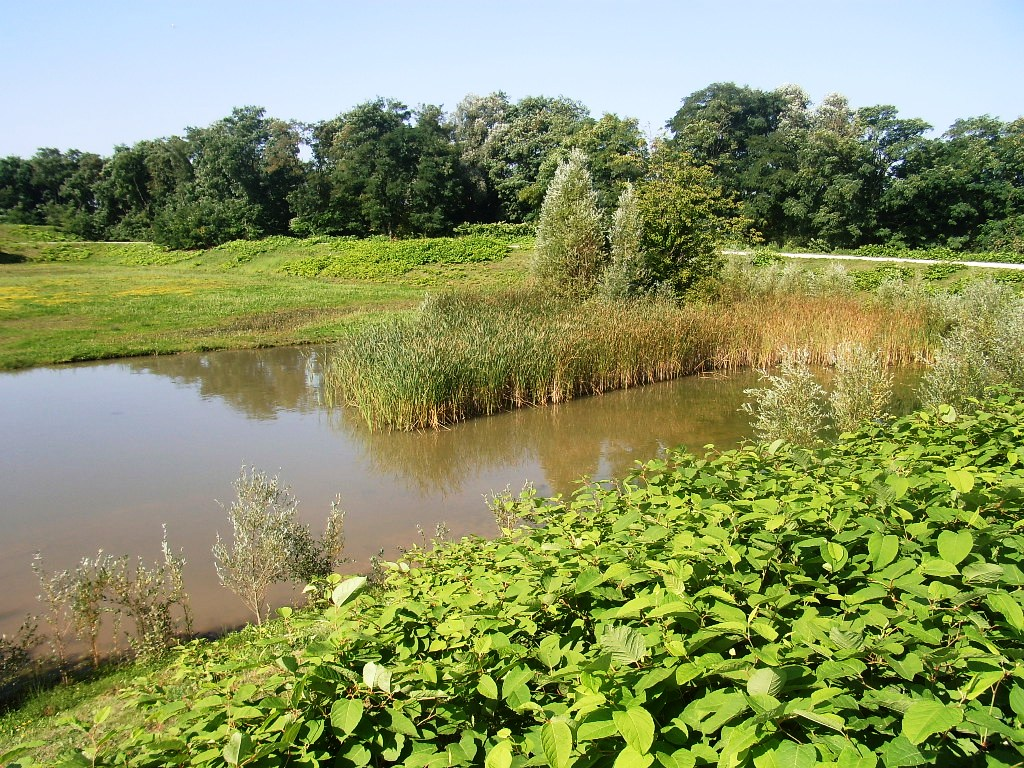
Rouillon river near Villejust

== Tributaries ==
- le ruisseau blanc

== Special places ==
A bridge, which is called le pont des Templiers (the Templars' bridge) and is considered the oldest bridge in the Essonne department, is near Balizy, an area of Longjumeau. It was built in the 13th century.

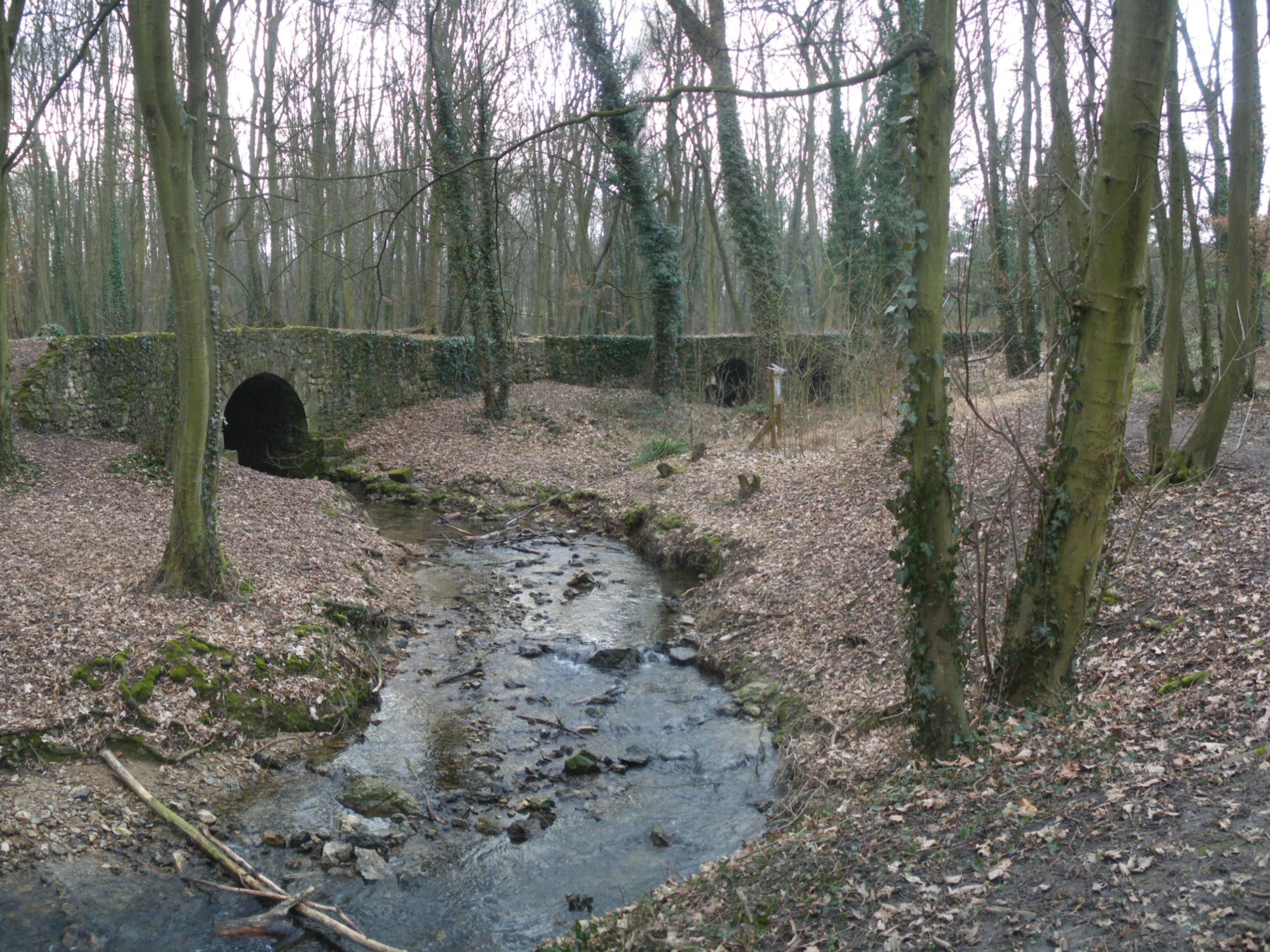

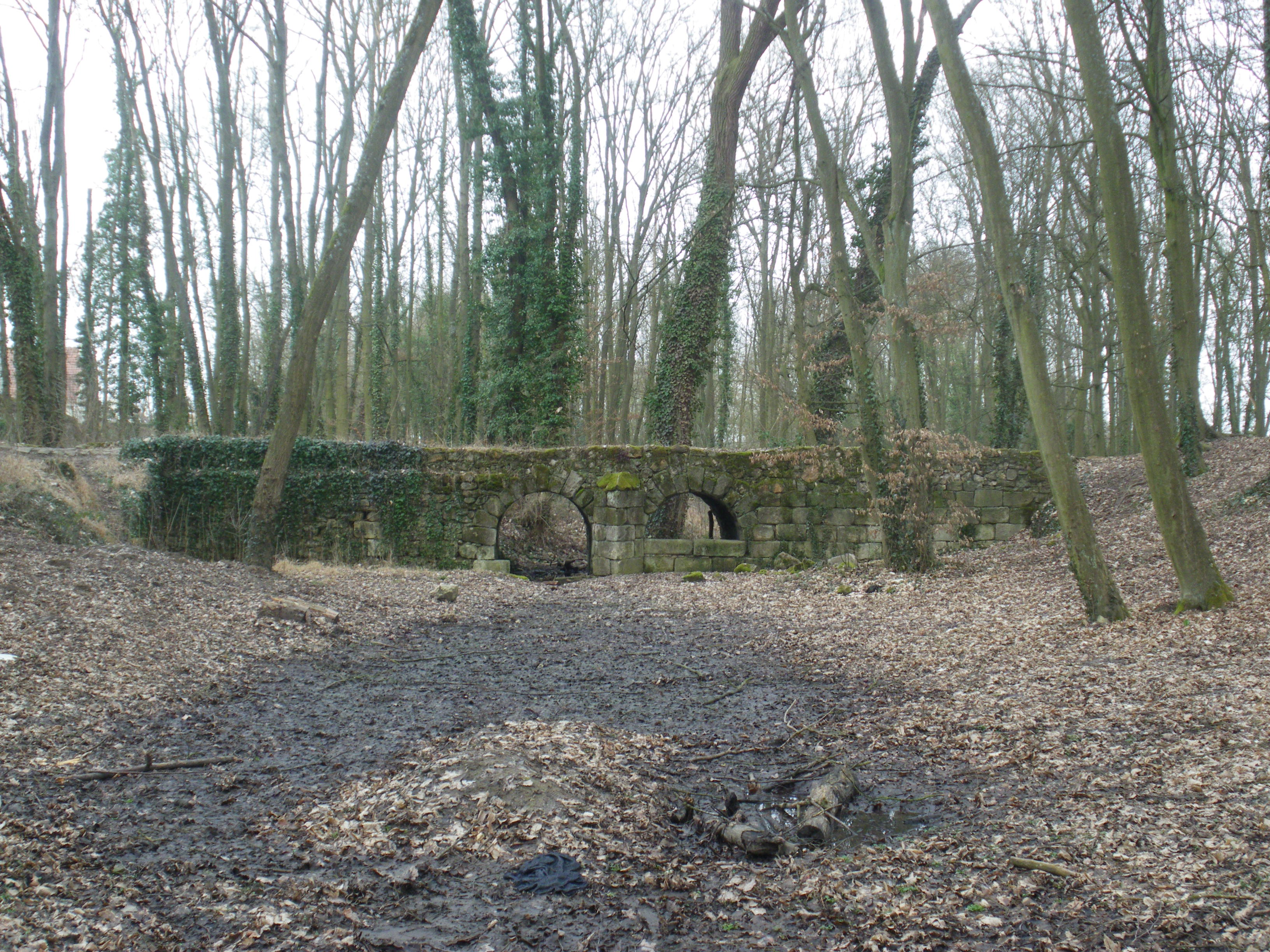
