= Services automobiles de la vallée de Chevreuse =

Network of passenger transport in Île-de-France

- Type: Société par actions simplifiée
- Industry: combined administrative office services
- Headquarters: Chevreuse, Essonne, France
- Products: Road passenger transport
- Website: www.savac.fr

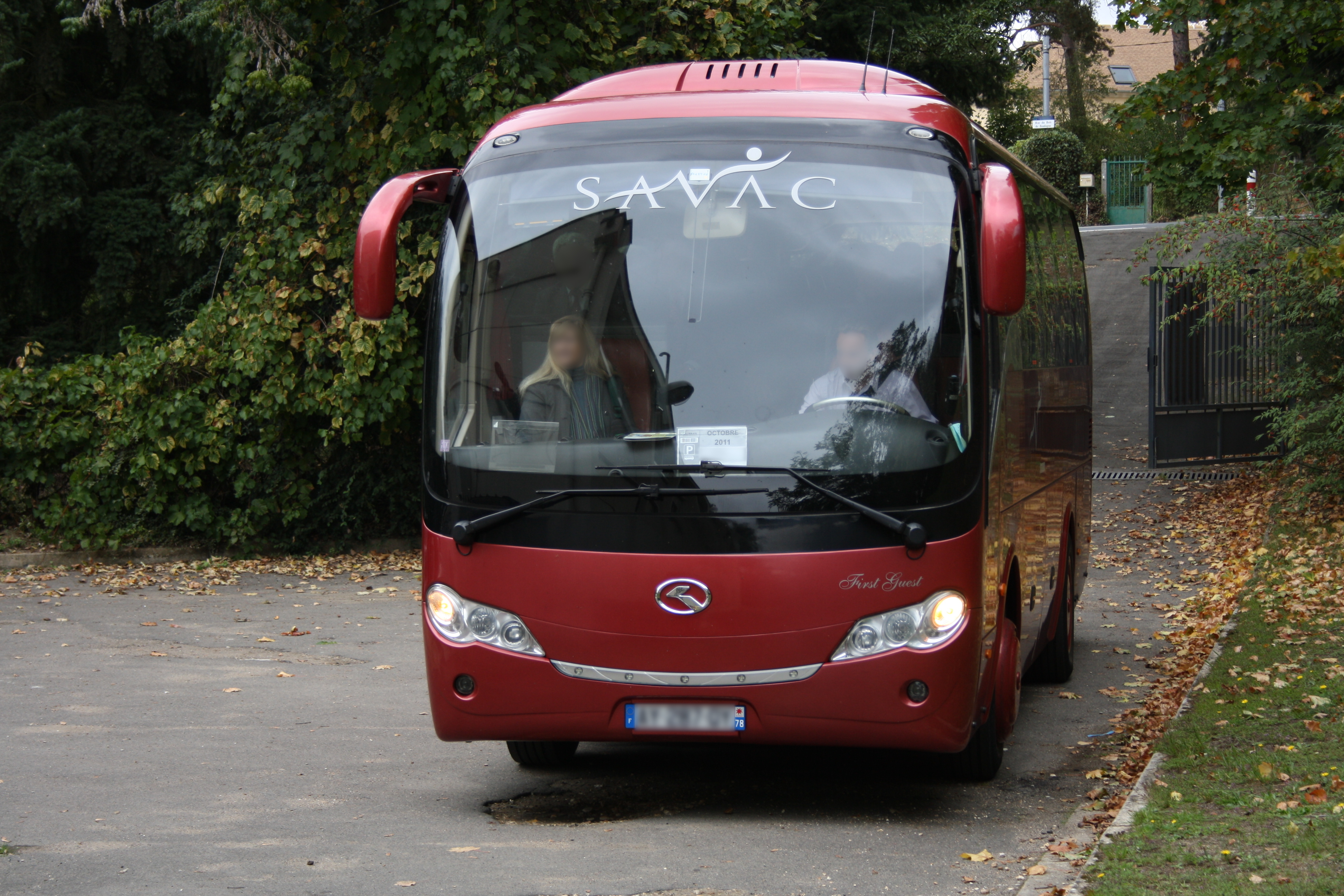
SAVAC bus

The company Services automobiles de la vallée de Chevreuse commonly called SAVAC provides a network of passenger transport in Île-de-France, in the south of Yvelines in the west of Essonne.

== Bus lines ==
=== Bus lines in Essonne ===
Lines	Links
Mobicaps 10	Gif-sur-Yvette ↔ Buc (ex 39.04)
39.05	Orsay ↔ Fontenay-lès-Briis
39.07	Orsay ↔ Saint-Arnoult-en-Yvelines
Mobicaps 11	Gif-sur-Yvette ↔ Les Ulis (ex 39.08)
39.13	Saint-Rémy-lès-Chevreuse ↔ Limours ↔ Bonnelles
39.14	Orsay ↔ Vaugrigneuse
39.15	Janvry ↔ Briis-sous-Forges
39.18	Limours ↔ Arpajon
Mobicaps 12	Courcelle ↔ Les Ulis (ex 39.19)
236.23	Longvilliers ↔ Saint Arnoult ↔ Ablis
39.28	Collège Jean Monnet, (Briis)
39.29	Collège Michel Vignaud, (Limours)
39.30	Lycée Jules Verne (Limours)
Mobicaps 13	Courcelle ↔ Gif-sur-Yvette (ex 39.32)

=== Bus Lines in Yvelines ===
Lignes	Relations
39.02	Saint-Rémy-lès-Chevreuse ↔ Courcelle
39.03	Saint-Rémy-lès-Chevreuse ↔ Rambouillet
39.10	Saint-Rémy-lès-Chevreuse ↔ Domaine de Saint Paul
39.12	Versailles ↔ Guyancourt ↔ Magny-les-Hameaux
39.07	Saint-Rémy-lès-Chevreuse ↔ La Verrière
39.221	Versailles ↔ Satory (Phébus)
39.27	Saint-Rémy-lès-Chevreuse ↔ Les Essarts-le-Roi
39.31	Chevreuse ↔ Montigny-le-Bretonneux
39.34	Guyancourt ↔ Meudon-la-Forêt ↔ Boulogne-Billancourt
39.103	Saint-Rémy-lès-Chevreuse ↔ Cernay-la-Ville
39.203	Cernay-la-Ville ↔ Vieille-Église-en-Yvelines ↔ Rambouillet
39.303	Saint-Rémy-lès-Chevreuse ↔ Rambouillet (express)
39.403	Saint-Rémy-lès-Chevreuse ↔ Rhodon ↔ Chevreuse
262A	Saint-Rémy-lès-Chevreuse ↔ Versailles
262B	Toussus-le-Noble (certaines courses) ↔ Buc ↔ Versailles
263	Versailles ↔ Châteaufort ↔ Campus
307	Vélizy-Villacoublay ↔ Saint-Quentin-en-Yvelines
39.437	Saint-Rémy-lès-Chevreuse ↔ Magny-les-Hameaux (line 437 SqyBus)
39.439	Voisins-le-Bretonneux ↔ Versailles (line 439 SqyBus)
39.440	Voisins-le-Bretonneux ↔ Versailles (line 440 SqyBus)
39.35	Collège Pierre de Coubertin (Chevreuse)
39.36	Collège Catherine de Vivonne (Rambouillet)
39.37	Lycée franco-allemand (Buc)
39.438	Schools of Saint-Quentin-en-Yvelines (line 438 SqyBus)
