= Courcelle-sur-Yvette station =

Railway station in Gif-sur-Yvette, France

Courcelle-sur-Yvette
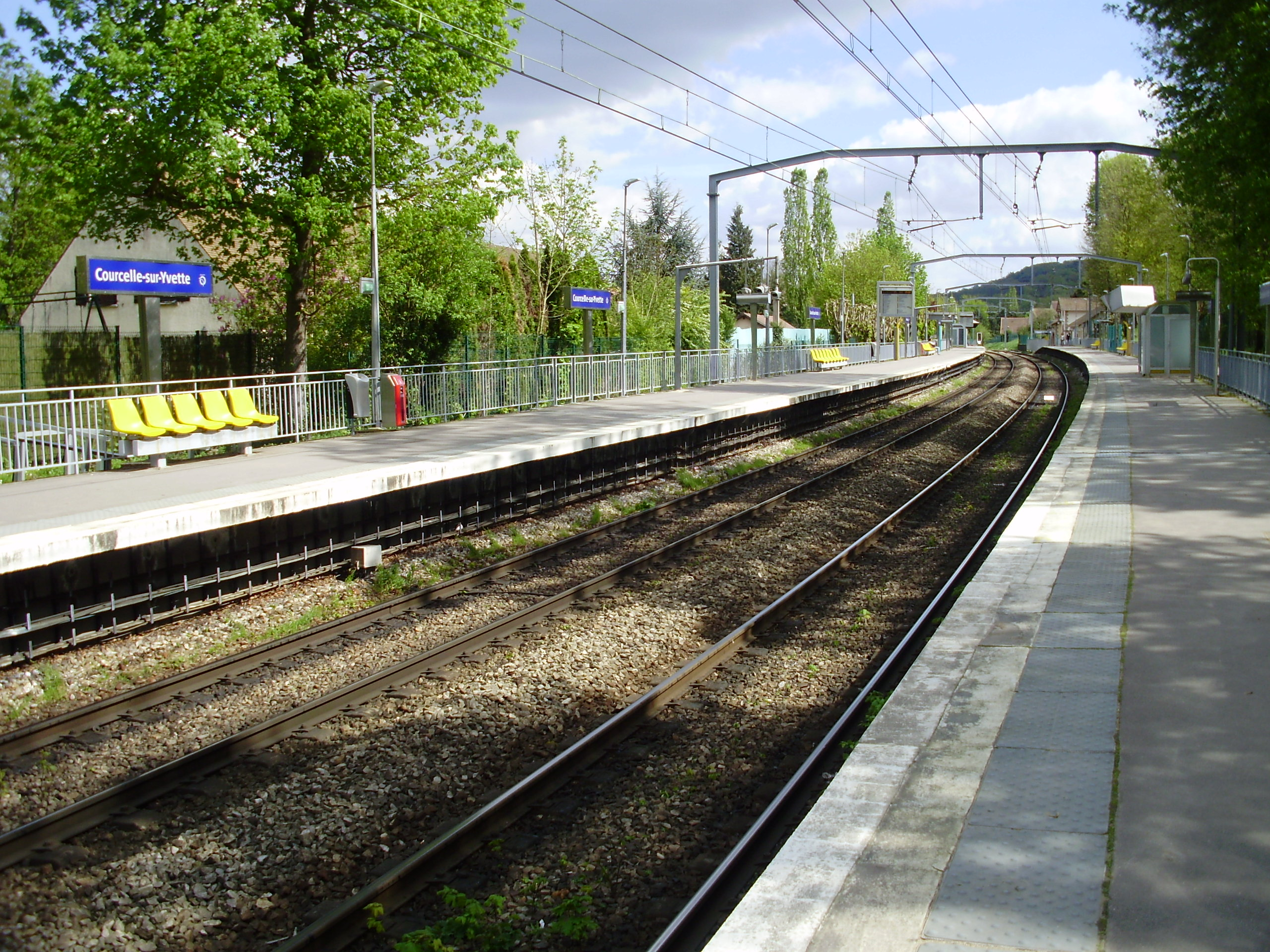
- Courcelle-sur-Yvette station platforms

General information
- Location: Gif-sur-Yvette; France
- Coordinates: 48°42′3″N 2°5′56″E
- Operator: RATP Group
- Line: Ligne de Sceaux
- Platforms: 2 side platforms
- Tracks: 2

Construction
- Structure type: At-grade
- Parking: 85 spaces
- Accessible: Yes, by request to staff

Other information
- Station code: 87758888
- Fare zone: 5

Services
Preceding station	RER	Following station
Gif-sur-Yvette towards Aéroport Charles de Gaulle 2 TGV or Mitry–Claye	RER B	Saint-Rémy-lès-Chevreuse Terminus
Location

Courcelle-sur-Yvette station is an RER B station of Gif-sur-Yvette, near Paris, France. It is also the name of a district of this town.

An underpass was built in 1983 to connect the two platforms of the station.

== Connections ==
- Noctilien: N122
- SAVAC (bus) : 39.02, Mobicaps n°12
