= Épinay-sur-Orge =

Commune in Île-de-France, France

- Commune
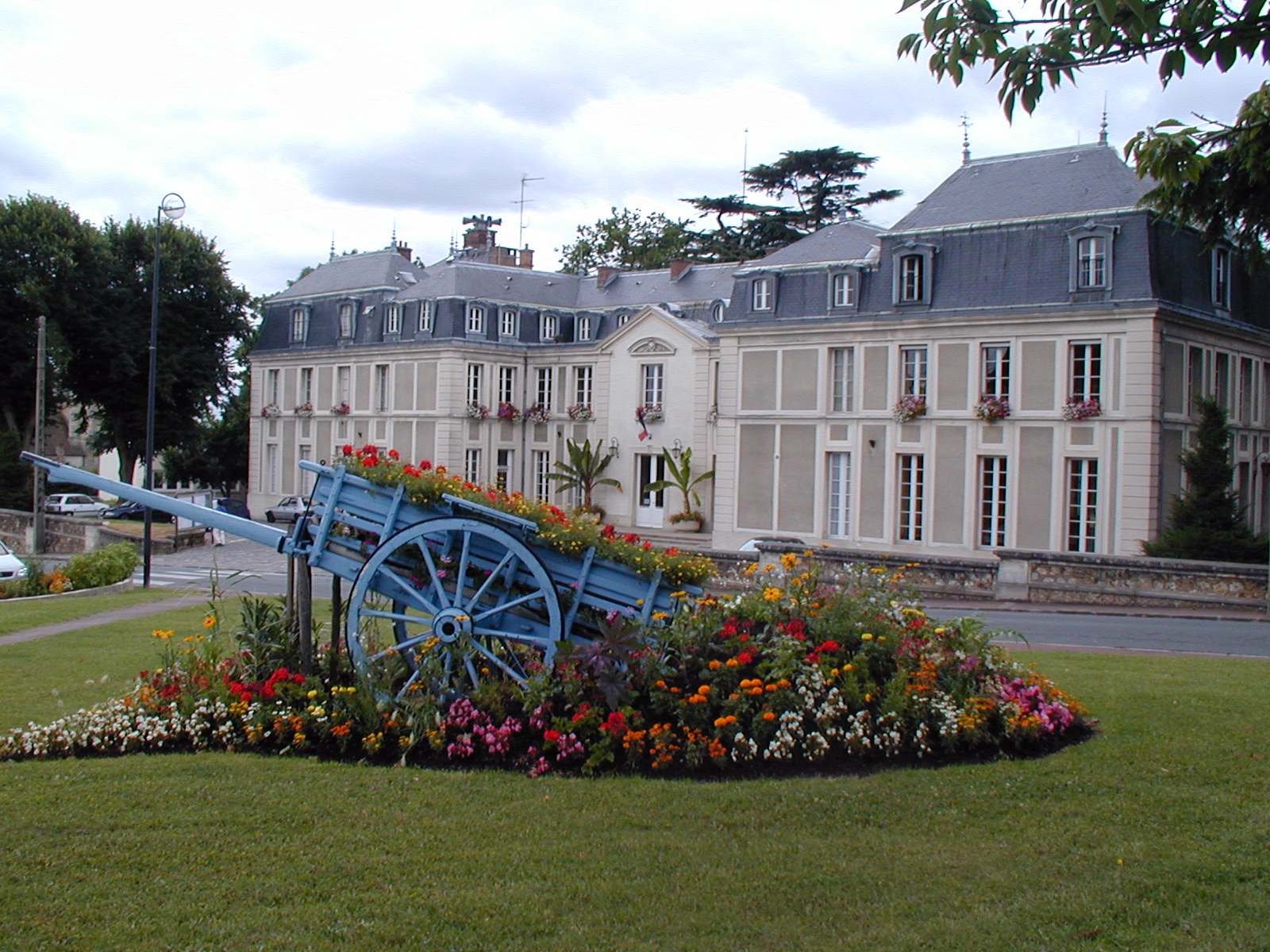
- Town hall

- Coat of arms
- Location of Épinay-sur-Orge
- Location within France Location within Île-de-France (region)
- Coordinates: 48°40′21″N 2°19′26″E
- Country: France
- Region: Île-de-France
- Department: Essonne
- Arrondissement: Palaiseau
- Canton: Longjumeau
- Intercommunality: CA Paris-Saclay

Government
  - Mayor (2023–2026): Olivier Marchau
- Area^{1}: 4.44 km^{2} (1.71 sq mi)
- Highest elevation: 89 m (292 ft)
- Lowest elevation: 36 m (118 ft)
- Population (2023): 10,722
  - Density: 2,410/km^{2} (6,250/sq mi)
- Time zone: UTC+01:00 (CET)
  - Summer (DST): UTC+02:00 (CEST)
- INSEE/Postal code: 91216 /91360
- ^{1} French Land Register data, which excludes lakes, ponds, glaciers > 1 km^{2} (0.386 sq mi or 247 acres) and river estuaries.

Épinay-sur-Orge (French pronunciation: [epinɛ syʁ ɔʁʒ], literally Épinay on Orge) is a commune in the Essonne department in Île-de-France in northern France.

It is situated near Orly Airport some 17 km (11 mi) south of Paris on the A6 motorway. Épinay is served by two stations on different branches of line C of the RER suburban railway system: Épinay-sur-Orge and Petit-Vaux.

== Geography ==
The town is located on a plateau overlooking three rivers:

- the Rouillon flows from West to East along the North side of the town and into the Yvette;
- the Yvette flows from North to South past the East of the town and into the Orge at the point where the three communes of Épinay-sur-Orge, Villemoisson-sur-Orge, and Savigny-sur-Orge meet;
- the Orge flows from West to East past the South of the town.

=== Climate ===
Épinay-sur-Orge has an oceanic climate (Köppen climate classification Cfb). The average annual temperature in Épinay-sur-Orge is 11.5 °C (52.7 °F). The average annual rainfall is 694.4 mm (27.34 in) with December as the wettest month. The temperatures are highest on average in August, at around 20.1 °C (68.2 °F), and lowest in January, at around 4.2 °C (39.6 °F). The highest temperature ever recorded in Épinay-sur-Orge was 40.5 °C (104.9 °F) on 12 August 2003; the coldest temperature ever recorded was −17.5 °C (0.5 °F) on 17 January 1985.

Climate data for Épinay-sur-Orge (1991−2020 normals, extremes 1966−2004)
| Month | Jan | Feb | Mar | Apr | May | Jun | Jul | Aug | Sep | Oct | Nov | Dec | Year |
|---|---|---|---|---|---|---|---|---|---|---|---|---|---|
| Record high °C (°F) | 17.0 (62.6) | 21.0 (69.8) | 26.0 (78.8) | 28.5 (83.3) | 30.5 (86.9) | 36.0 (96.8) | 37.0 (98.6) | 40.5 (104.9) | 32.8 (91.0) | 29.5 (85.1) | 21.0 (69.8) | 16.5 (61.7) | 40.5 (104.9) |
| Mean daily maximum °C (°F) | 7.2 (45.0) | 8.8 (47.8) | 13.1 (55.6) | 15.6 (60.1) | 20.0 (68.0) | 23.2 (73.8) | 25.5 (77.9) | 26.2 (79.2) | 20.7 (69.3) | 15.8 (60.4) | 10.5 (50.9) | 7.5 (45.5) | 16.2 (61.2) |
| Daily mean °C (°F) | 4.2 (39.6) | 4.9 (40.8) | 8.2 (46.8) | 10.2 (50.4) | 14.5 (58.1) | 17.6 (63.7) | 19.7 (67.5) | 20.1 (68.2) | 15.4 (59.7) | 11.5 (52.7) | 7.1 (44.8) | 4.8 (40.6) | 11.5 (52.7) |
| Mean daily minimum °C (°F) | 1.2 (34.2) | 1.2 (34.2) | 3.3 (37.9) | 4.9 (40.8) | 9.1 (48.4) | 11.9 (53.4) | 13.9 (57.0) | 14.1 (57.4) | 10.2 (50.4) | 7.2 (45.0) | 3.7 (38.7) | 2.1 (35.8) | 6.9 (44.4) |
| Record low °C (°F) | −17.5 (0.5) | −12.5 (9.5) | −8.0 (17.6) | −4.0 (24.8) | −0.3 (31.5) | 1.0 (33.8) | 5.4 (41.7) | 4.5 (40.1) | 1.5 (34.7) | −3.5 (25.7) | −10.5 (13.1) | −12.0 (10.4) | −17.5 (0.5) |
| Average precipitation mm (inches) | 57.5 (2.26) | 50.8 (2.00) | 51.4 (2.02) | 48.6 (1.91) | 64.2 (2.53) | 57.1 (2.25) | 55.9 (2.20) | 65.0 (2.56) | 49.8 (1.96) | 59.7 (2.35) | 61.3 (2.41) | 73.1 (2.88) | 694.4 (27.34) |
| Average precipitation days (≥ 1.0 mm) | 11.3 | 10.2 | 9.8 | 9.5 | 9.4 | 8.6 | 7.5 | 7.8 | 8.2 | 10.2 | 11.2 | 12.8 | 116.5 |
Source: Météo-France

== History ==
The area of Épinay-sur-Orge was inhabited from prehistoric times. The town is first mentioned in a 9th-century document as Spinetum. Traces of habitations from the Middle Ages have been found at Breuil (in the South) and Petit Vaux (West of the present-day centre). Slowly, such clusters of building grew towards one agricultural settlement. The town was created in 1793. In May 1843, the development of the town received a boost from becoming a stop on the Paris-Orléans railway, now the main RER station. In the Franco-Prussian War, the Prussians executed 4 resistance fighters in Épinay. A monument to them is in the town cemetery. On 23 August 1944, Épinay was liberated by the "group Warabiot" of the 2nd armoured division (the division Leclerc) on its way from Argentan to Paris. On 21 January 1945, the city decided to rename the rue de Montlhéry, henceforth known as the rue de la Division Leclerc.

== Population ==
The inhabitants of Épinay are known as Spinoliens.

Historical population
| Year | Pop. | ±% p.a. |
|---|---|---|
| 1968 | 9,032 | — |
| 1975 | 9,366 | +0.52% |
| 1982 | 8,745 | −0.98% |
| 1990 | 9,688 | +1.29% |
| 1999 | 9,399 | −0.34% |
| 2007 | 10,261 | +1.10% |
| 2012 | 10,285 | +0.05% |
| 2017 | 11,270 | +1.85% |
| 2023 | 10,722 | −0.83% |
Source: INSEE

== Sights ==
Épinay-sur-Orge was long known for its system of market gardens, providing Parisians with fresh vegetables. The gardens were irrigated with a system of locks in the rivers. Only one of these remains. To the south-east of the town is the psychiatric hospital "Vaucluse". The building was the expatriate home of a rich Irishman who left it to the Department of the Essonne in 1863 on the condition that it be turned into an "asylum for the mad". Reconstruction was finished in 1865. In 1869 the hospital opened with a capacity of around 1000 patients. At that time, the town had a population of 587. Patients built the tower on the grounds, as this was considered therapeutic. There is a long history of conflict between the hospital and the town over the high water level, caused by the river locks, which eroded the land of the hospital and flooded the patients' gardens.

Another monument is the town hall, originally the palace of the Duchess Carafa de Noja. After her death in 1923, the town bought the building and surrounding park. This finally allowed the construction of a fresh water supply system (1923) and electrification (1925). The grand avenue leading towards the palace is still clearly recognizable, with cherry trees blooming in spring.

== See also ==
- Communes of the Essonne department
