= Louis Sédilot =

French colonist of Quebec

Louis Sédilot (c.1599 – January 25, 1672) was one of the first French colonists of Québec.

== Biography ==
Sédilot was born about 1599 or 1600 at Montreuil-sur-Brêche, France, and moved to Gif-sur-Yvette, Île-de-France where he worked as a gardener.

He married Marie Challe Charier in 1626, and they had one child, Marie (1627–84). At some point prior to 1636, the elder Marie died and Sédilot found himself widowed.

In 1636, Sédilot remarried, taking as his wife Marie Grimoult. Their wedding was held in Saint Remy, France. In 1637 Sédilot travelled with his wife and daughter to Québec, where he obtained work from the Company of One Hundred Associates clearing and planting land. He appears to have been successful at this work as his contract was renewed in 1640. In 1645 Sédilot received land from Governor Charles de Montmagny, which he settled on with his family. By this stage Sédilot and Grimoult had had further children, and in order to provide lands for his sons, Sédilot acquired further land from Louis d'Ailleboust in 1651, and from Le Vicomte d'Argenson in 1660. In 1667, census records show that he owned 34 acres of cropland and three cattle.

Sédilot died January 25, 1672, and he was buried the following day at Notre-Dame-de-Québec.
