= SOLEIL =

French synchrotron facility

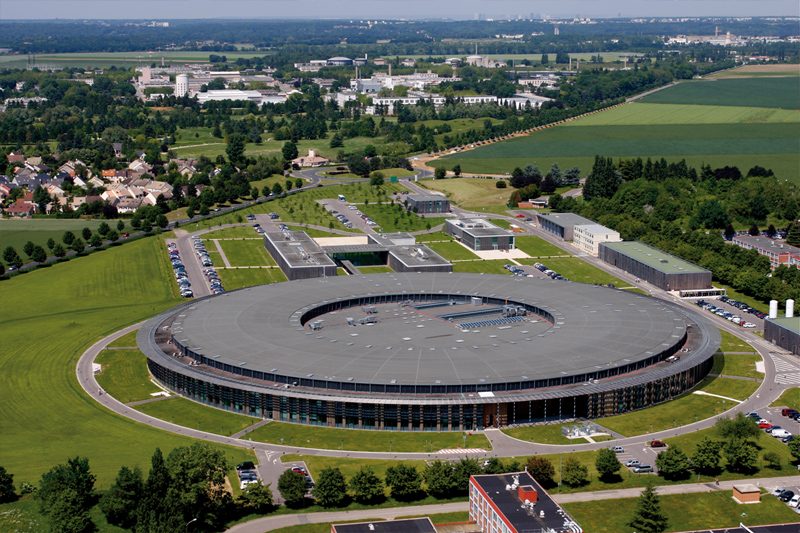
- SOLEIL on 10 June 2009

General properties
- Accelerator type: Synchrotron light source
- Beam type: electrons
- Target type: Light source

Beam properties
- Maximum energy: 2.75 GeV

Physical properties
- Circumference: 354 metres (1,161 ft)
- Location: Saint-Aubin, France
- Coordinates: 48°42′36″N 2°08′42″E
- Dates of operation: 2006 - present

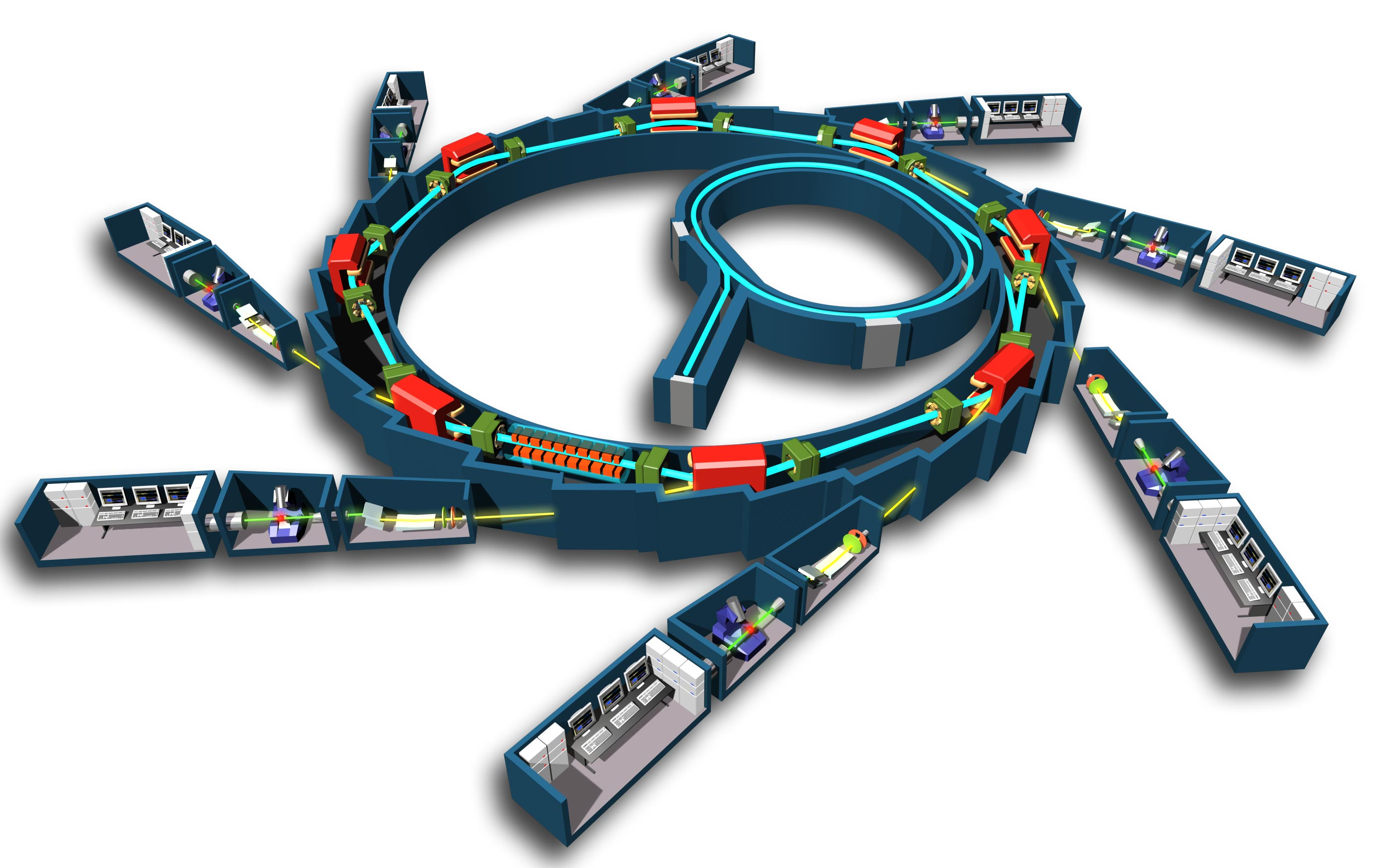
Diagram of machinery

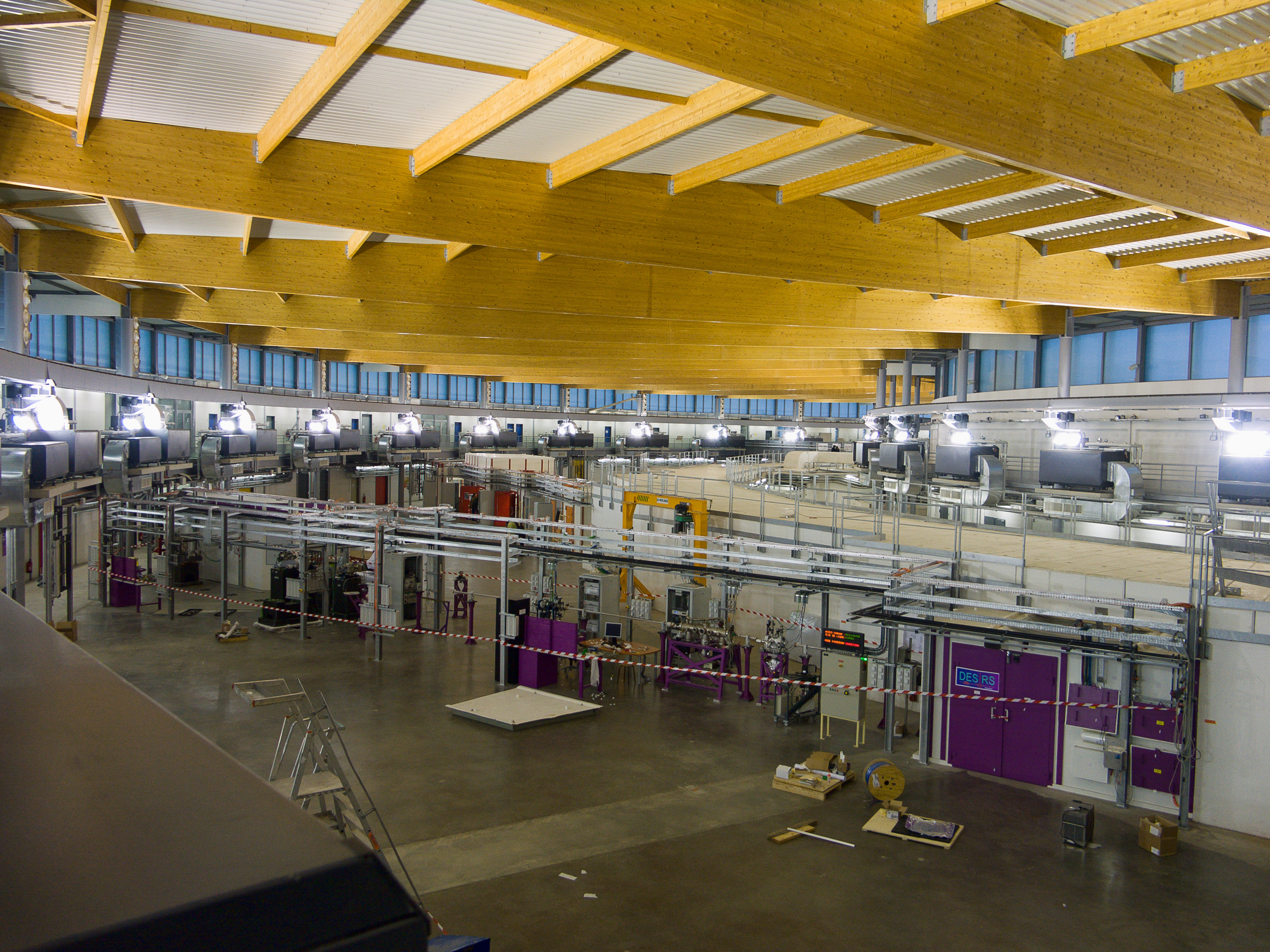
View of the interior of facility

SOLEIL ("Sun" in French) is a synchrotron facility near Paris, France. It performed its first acceleration of electrons on May 14, 2006. The name SOLEIL is a backronym for Source Optimisée de Lumière d’Énergie Intermédiaire du LURE (LURE optimised intermediary energy light source), LURE meaning Laboratoire pour l'Utilisation du Rayonnement Électromagnétique.

The facility is run by a civil corporation held by the French National Centre for Scientific Research (CNRS) and the French Alternative Energies and Atomic Energy Commission (CEA), two French national research agencies. It is located in Saint-Aubin in the Essonne département, a south-western suburb of Paris, near Gif-sur-Yvette and Saclay, which host other facilities for nuclear and particle physics.

The facility is an associate member of the University of Paris-Saclay.

SOLEIL also hosts IPANEMA, the European research platform on ancient materials (archaeology, palaeontology, past environments and cultural heritage), a joint CNRS / French Ministry of Culture and Communication research unit.

SOLEIL covers fundamental research needs in physics, chemistry, material sciences, life sciences (notably in the crystallography of biological macromolecules), earth sciences, and atmospheric sciences. It offers the use of a wide range of spectroscopic methods from infrared to X-rays, and structural methods such as X-ray diffraction and scattering.

== Main parameters ==
SOLEIL contains electrons travelling with an energy of 2.75 GeV around a 354 m circumference. It takes the electrons 1.2 μs to travel around this ring at almost the speed of light; 847,000 times per second.

== Most Cited Scientists at Synchrotron SOLEIL ==
According to Google Scholar, the current top 10 most cited scientists affiliated with Synchrotron SOLEIL are:

- John Bozek

 Citations: 25,935  
 Research Areas: X-ray physics, synchrotron radiation, XFEL, chemical physics, ultrafast X-ray

- Jose Avila

 Citations: 17,106  
 Research Areas: Not specified

- Amina Taleb Ibrahimi

 Citations: 14,128  
 Research Areas: Condensed matter physics, low-dimensional systems

- Timm Weitkamp

 Citations: 12,812  
 Research Areas: X-ray imaging, microtomography, X-ray microscopy, X-ray phase contrast imaging

- Laurent Nahon

 Citations: 12,133  
 Research Areas: Chirality, circular dichroism, molecular photoionization, VUV spectroscopy, polarimetry

 Citations: 10,715  
 Research Areas: Physical chemistry, materials for energy and hydrogen

- Pavel Dudin

 Citations: 9,171  
 Research Areas: Band structure, materials science, topological insulators, graphene, superconductors

- François Bertran

 Citations: 9,019  
 Research Areas: Physics

- Pierre Legrand

 Citations: 8,743  
 Research Areas: Structural virology, nucleic acid–protein interaction, crystallography, cryo-EM, tomography, synchrotron

- Andrea Resta

 Citations: 8,310  
 Research Areas: Surface science, catalysis, nano objects, thin films
