= Yvette (river) =

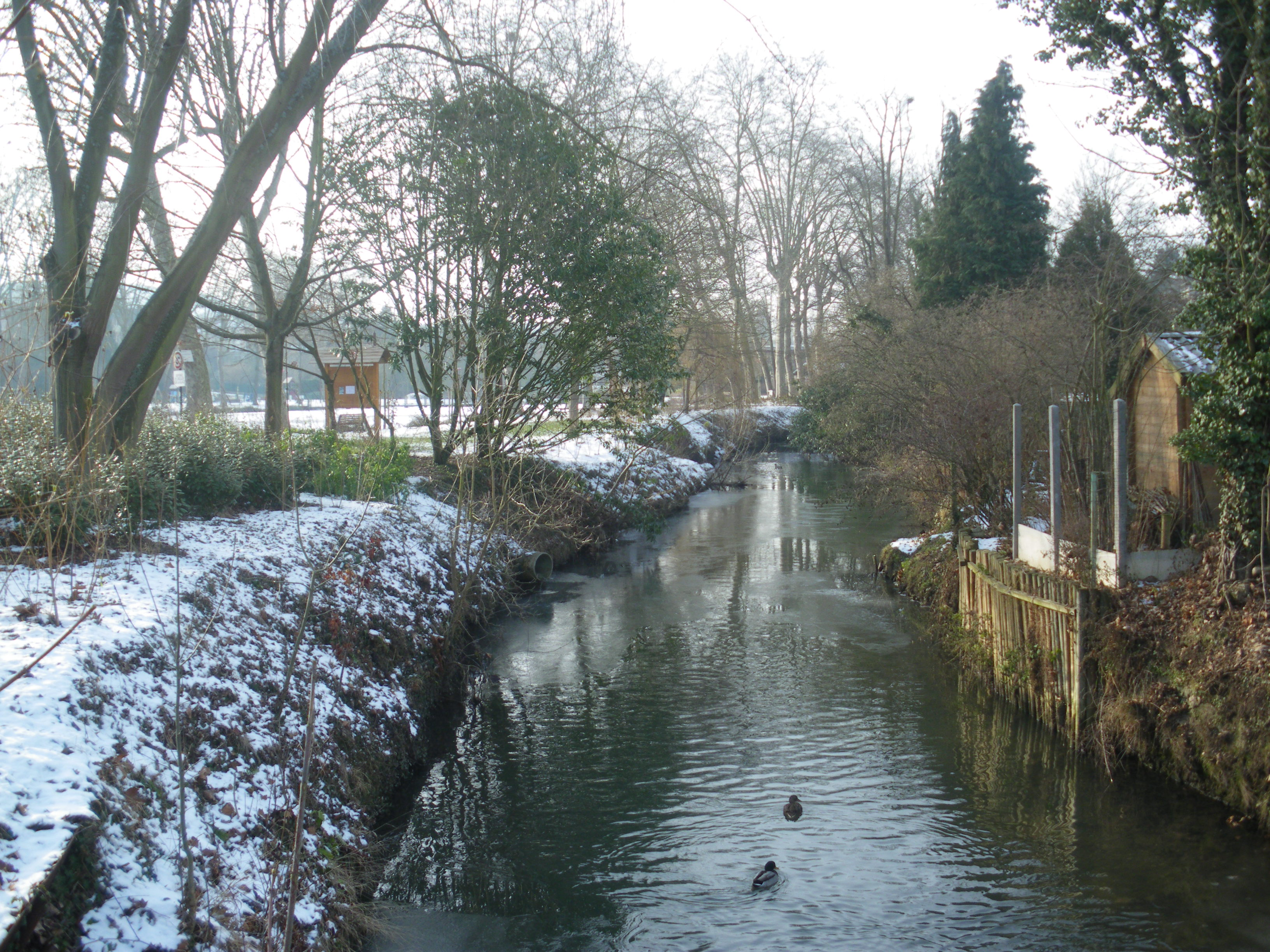
- Yvette river downtown Orsay

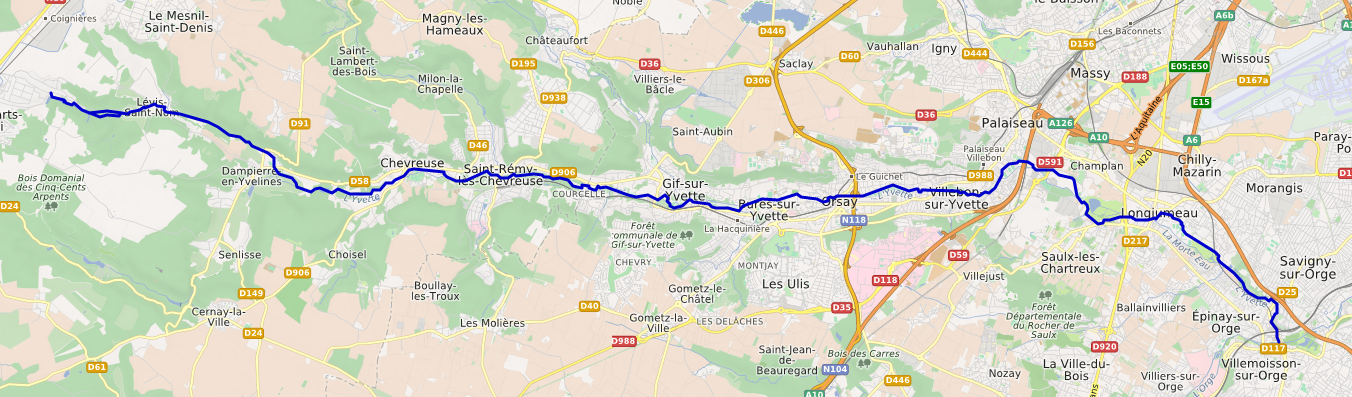

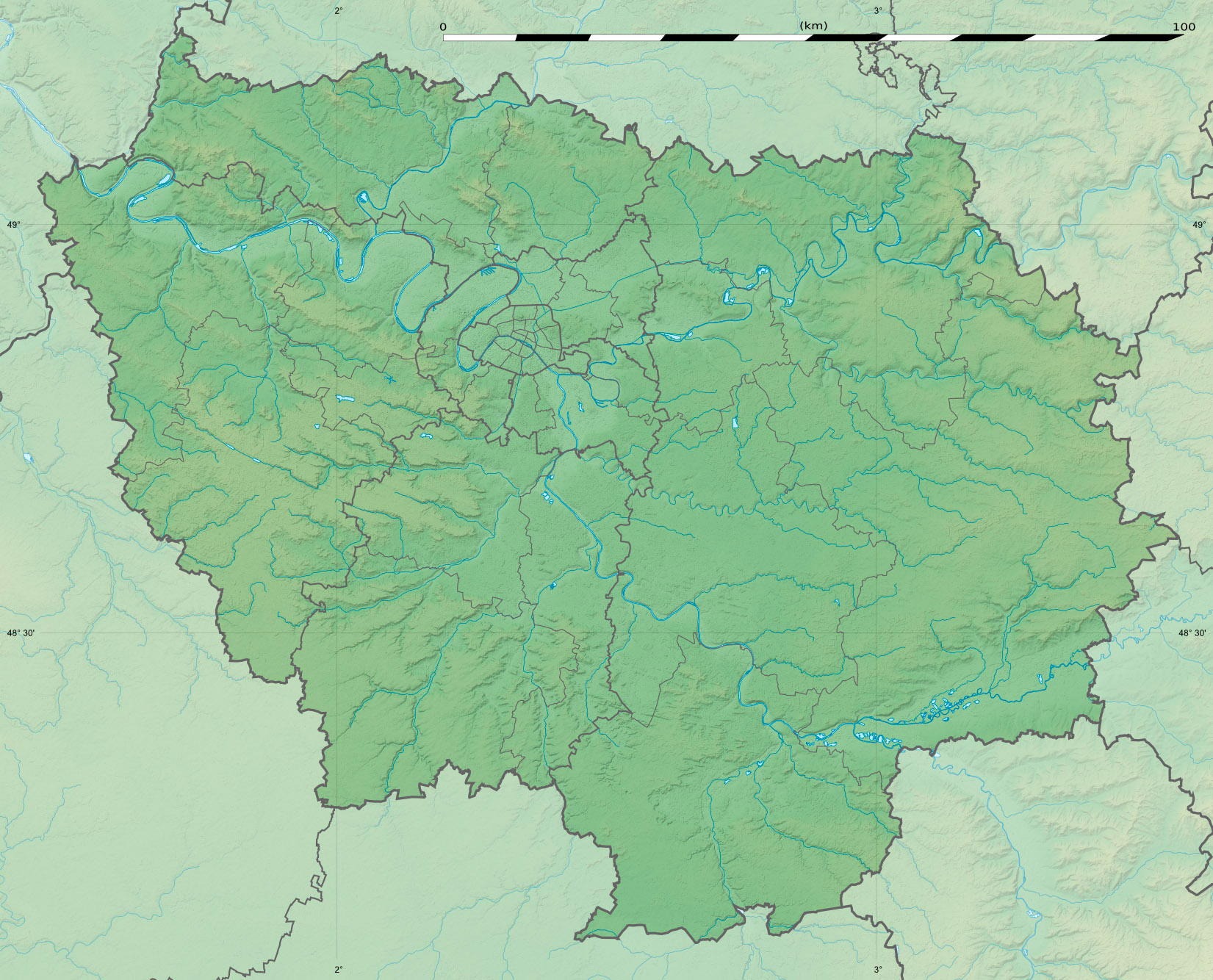
- Location within France Location within Île-de-France (region)

Location
- Country: France

Physical characteristics
- Mouth
  - location: Orge
  - coordinates: 48°40′2″N 2°20′18″E
- Length: 39.3 km (24.4 mi)

Basin features
- Progression: Orge→ Seine→ English Channel

The Yvette (French pronunciation: [ivɛt]) is a small river in southern Île-de-France (France), left tributary of the Orge, which is a tributary of the Seine. It is 39.3 km (24.4 mi) long. Its source is in Les Essarts-le-Roi, north of Rambouillet, in the Yvelines department. Various communes of the Essonne department are named after it: Bures-sur-Yvette, Gif-sur-Yvette and Villebon-sur-Yvette.

The Yvette crosses the following departments and towns:

- Yvelines: Lévis-Saint-Nom, Dampierre-en-Yvelines, Saint-Forget, Chevreuse, Saint-Rémy-lès-Chevreuse
- Essonne: Gif-sur-Yvette, Bures-sur-Yvette, Orsay, Villebon-sur-Yvette, Palaiseau, Champlan, Saulx-les-Chartreux, Longjumeau, Chilly-Mazarin, Épinay-sur-Orge, Savigny-sur-Orge

== Tributaries ==
Left bank:

- Ru du Pommeret
- Ruisseau de la Goutte d'Or
- Rhodon
- Mérantaise

Right bank:

- Ru des Vaux de Cernay
- Rouillon de Valence
- Ru d'Écosse-Bouton
- Ruisseau de Montabé
- Vaularon
- Ruisseau de Paradis
- Rouillon

== See also ==
- Vallée de Chevreuse
