= Claude-François de Méneval =

Napoleon's secretary and writer (1778–1850)

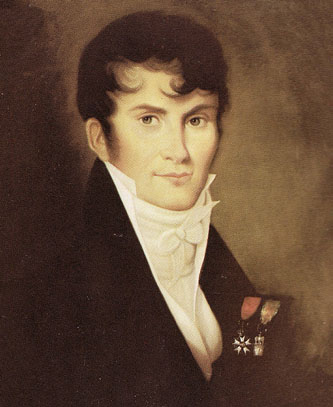
Claude-François de Méneval

Claude-François de Méneval (8 April 1778 – 1850) was Napoleon's private secretary from 1802 until 1813. He was awarded the title of Baron de Méneval, Baron of the Empire by Letters patent in 1810.

He was born in Paris to a merchant father and was educated at the Collège des Quatre-Nations. He attended salons, where he met Napoleon's brother, Louis Bonaparte, and was secretary to Joseph Bonaparte during his diplomatic missions, including the Convention of 1800 with the United States, the Treaty of Lunéville with Francis II, Holy Roman Emperor and the Treaty of Amiens with the United Kingdom.

After the disgrace of Louis Antoine Fauvelet de Bourrienne, Méneval was appointed Napoleon's private secretary, which required him to live in the Tuileries Palace with Napoleon.

Méneval married Aimée Virginie Joséphine des Comtes de Montvernot in 1807 and was made Baron de l'Empire in 1810.

Méneval accompanied Napoleon on his invasion of Russia in 1812 but was forced to resign as his secretary because of frostbite and declining health caused by the Russian winter. From 1813 until 1815, he served Empress Marie Louise, and during the Hundred Days of 1815, Napoleon wanted to create him Duke, Councillor of State and Minister for the Post, but his abdication put an end to this wish. Napoleon remembered Méneval fondly during his exile on Saint Helena: "He was gentle, reserved, zealous, very private, able to work at any time whatsoever. He never gave me anything less than satisfaction and pleasantness. And I loved him dearly."

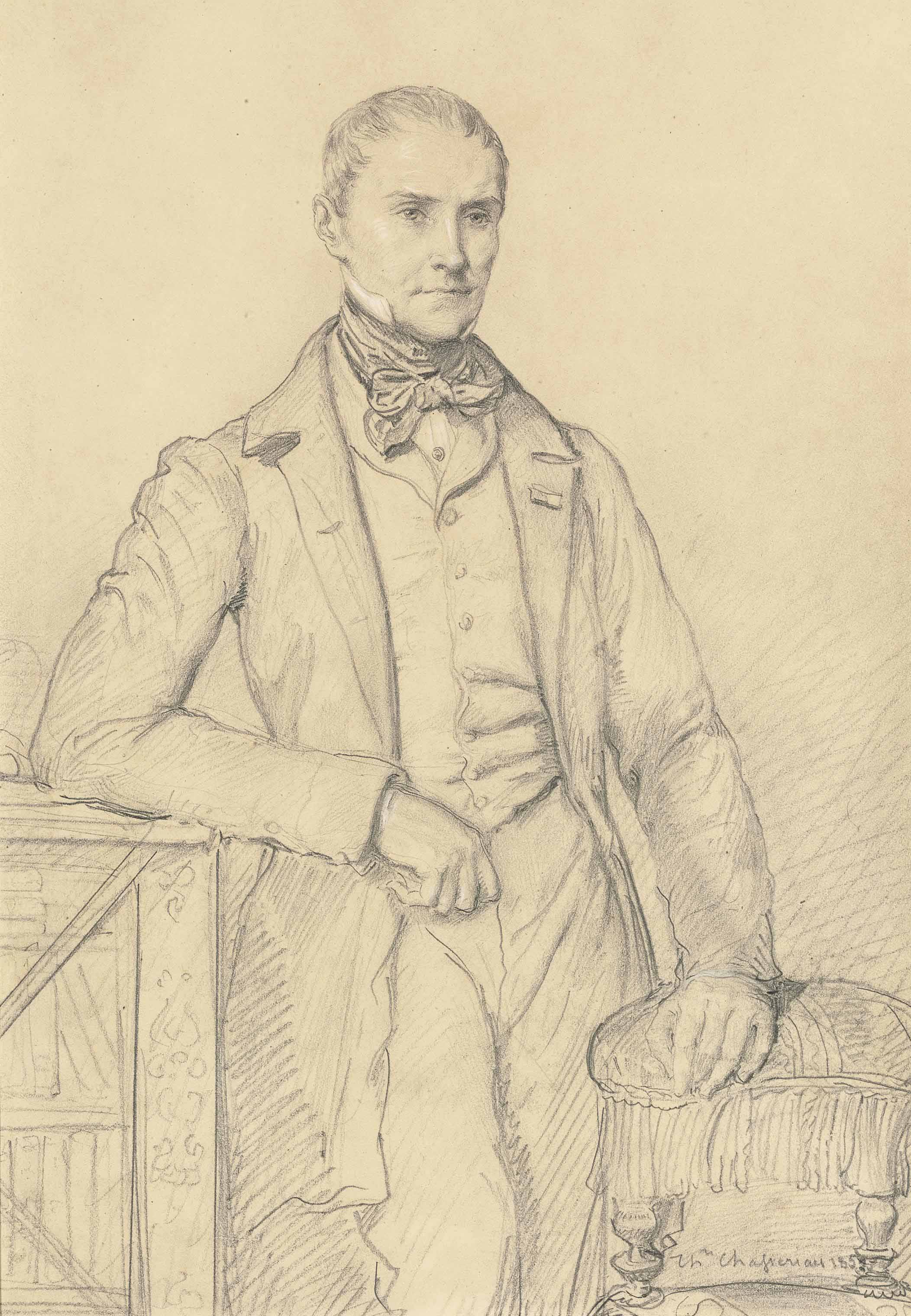
Claude-François de Méneval

His memoirs were published in 1843.

== Works ==
- Memoirs to Serve for the History of Napoleon I from 1802 to 1815, translated by Robert H. Sherard (London: Hutchinson, 1894).
