= Gif-sur-Yvette =

Commune in Île-de-France, France

- Commune
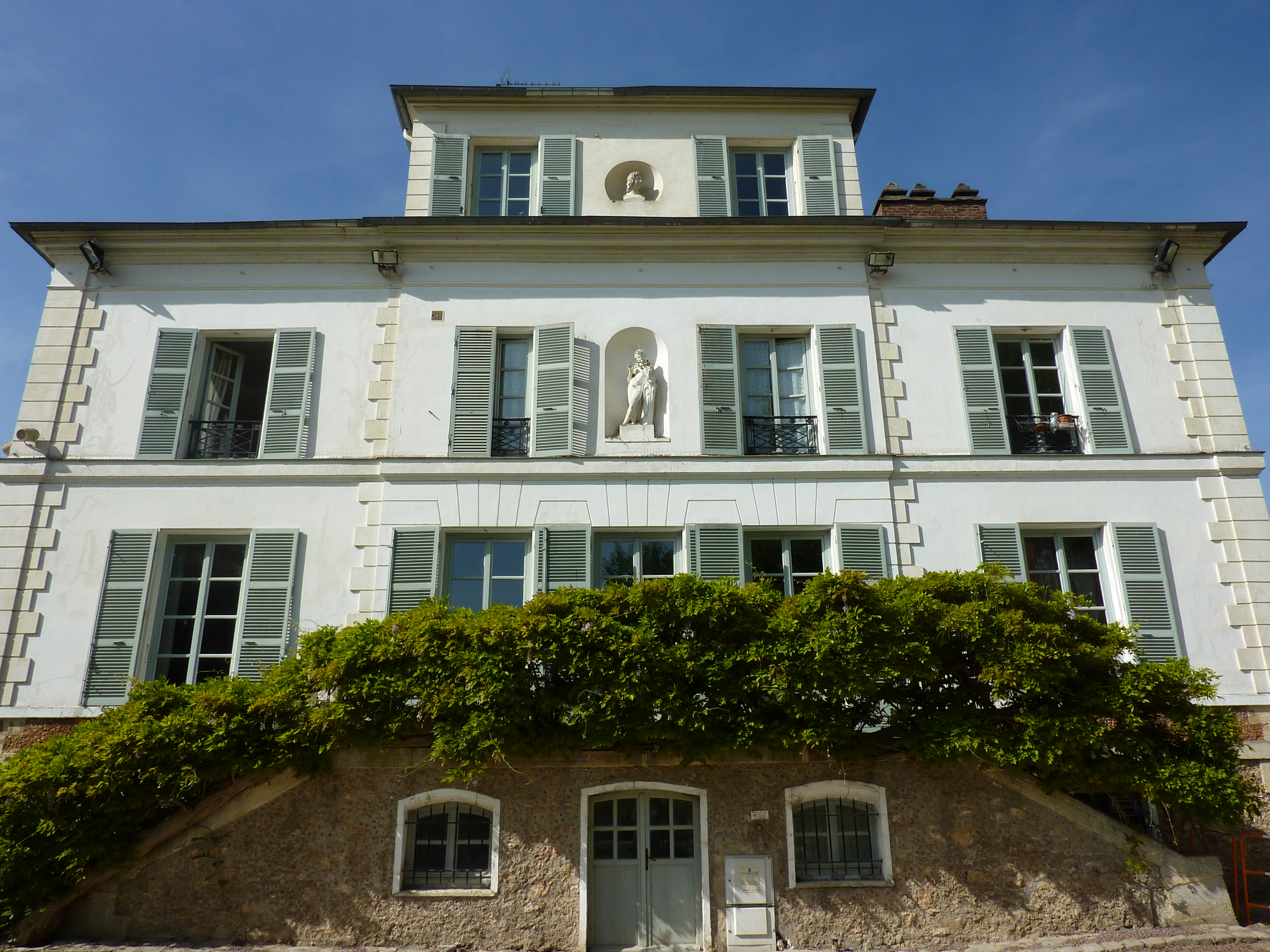
- The Hôtel de Ville (view from the park behind)

- Coat of arms
- Location of Gif-sur-Yvette
- Location within France Location within Île-de-France (region)
- Coordinates: 48°42′06″N 2°08′02″E
- Country: France
- Region: Île-de-France
- Department: Essonne
- Arrondissement: Palaiseau
- Canton: Gif-sur-Yvette
- Intercommunality: CA Paris-Saclay

Government
  - Mayor (2023–2026): Yann Cauchetier
- Area^{1}: 11.60 km^{2} (4.48 sq mi)
- Elevation: 61 m (200 ft)
- Highest elevation: 172 m (564 ft)
- Lowest elevation: 57 m (187 ft)
- Population (2023): 22,544
  - Density: 1,943/km^{2} (5,034/sq mi)
- Demonym: Giffois
- Time zone: UTC+01:00 (CET)
  - Summer (DST): UTC+02:00 (CEST)
- INSEE/Postal code: 91272 /91190
- Website: www.ville-gif.fr
- ^{1} French Land Register data, which excludes lakes, ponds, glaciers > 1 km^{2} (0.386 sq mi or 247 acres) and river estuaries.

Gif-sur-Yvette (French pronunciation: [ʒif syʁ ivɛt], lit. "Gif-on-Yvette") is a commune in southwestern Île-de-France, France. It is located in the Vallée de Chevreuse, 22.9 km (14.2 mi) from the centre of Paris (at Notre-Dame), in the Essonne department on the departmental border with Yvelines. As of 2023, the population of the commune was 22,544.

== Geography ==
The town is crossed by and named after the river Yvette. The total area is 11.60 km^{2} (4.48 sq mi) and 4.07 km^{2} (1.57 sq mi) is green spaces and woods.

=== Place names ===
The commune of Gif-sur-Yvette is composed of three main parts:

- In the valley: Rougemonts, Mérantaise, Mairie, Féverie, Coupières, Damiette, Courcelle, L'Abbaye, Les Coudraies;
- On the Moulon Plateau: Moulon (uninhabited, aside from a research and educational institute);
- On the Hurepoix Plateau: Hacquinière, Belleville and Chevry.

The commune includes a number of woods such as the Hacquinière wood and the D'Aigrefoin wood.

=== Neighbouring communes ===
The neighbouring communes are Villiers-le-Bâcle, Saint-Aubin, Saclay, Orsay, Bures-sur-Yvette, Gometz-le-Châtel, Gometz-la-Ville and Saint-Rémy-lès-Chevreuse.

== History ==
Human presence on the Moulon Plateau originates in Neolithic times. Agriculture was developed, notably during the Roman era. Between the 12th and the 18th century, an important Benedictine abbey was housed in Gif. In the 19th century, amid the Industrial Revolution, Gif remained largely agricultural, with operating mills in particular.

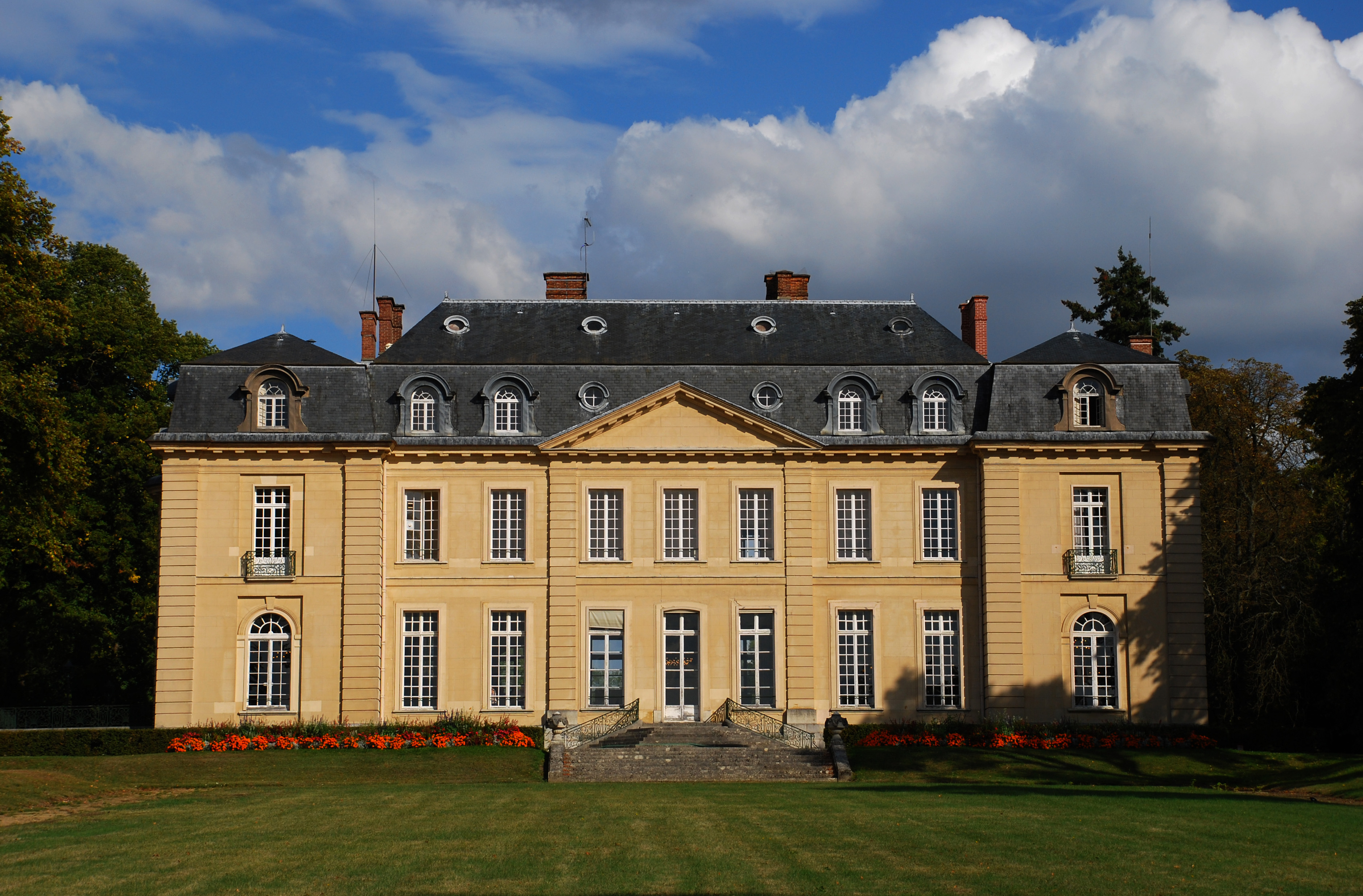
Château de Button

In the 1770s, the Château de Button by architect Pierre Desmaisons was completed in Gif. In 1946, the French National Centre for Scientific Research (CNRS) installed an office and research facility on the property.

The Château de L'Ermitage, now the Hôtel de Ville, was completed around 1835.

In 1867, the town was linked to Paris by train with the Ligne de Sceaux in the valley, which would later become the southern branch of the current-day RER B line.

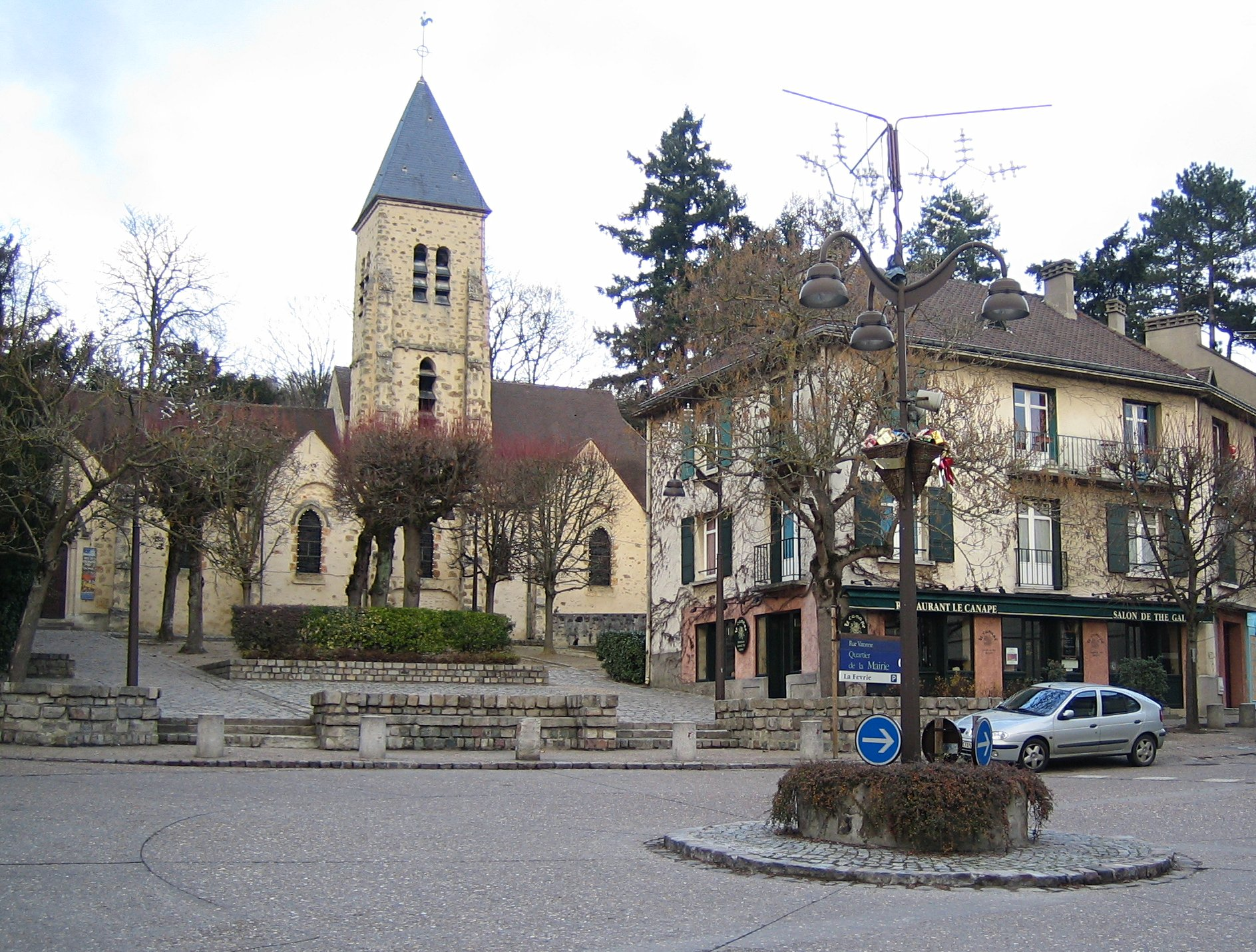
Église Saint-Rémi in Gif-sur-Yvette

Following the First World War, the Gif commune experienced an important demographic change, with an increasing population. The town took the name of Gif-sur-Yvette in 1930.

Just after the Second World War, Gif-sur-Yvette acquired an international scientific reputation, with the CNRS and Atomic Energy Commission (CEA) moving there. The CEA discovered radioactive contamination in a private home in Gif-sur-Yvette in 1974; the home had been built upon a site where needles containing radon gas were once manufactured, starting in 1915. The needles were used to sterilise infected tissue—an idea developed by Marie Curie.

The town was extended in 1975, with the creation of the Chevry neighbourhood, from areas ceded by the Gometz-la-Ville and Gometz-le-Châtel communes.

== Main sights ==
The Église Saint-Rémi (Saint Rémi church), a structure of Romanesque and Gothic architecture, was built in the 12th century. It was registered as a historic monument in 1938.

Some ruins remain of a Benedictine abbey which was built in the 12th century and became a national property in 1789 amid the French Revolution.

== Demographics ==
Inhabitants of Gif-sur-Yvette are known as Giffois (masculine) and Giffoises (feminine) in French.

Historical population

Year	Pop.	±% p.a.
1793	815	—
1800	810	−0.09%
1806	800	−0.21%
1821	738	−0.54%
1831	733	−0.07%
1836	712	−0.58%
1841	717	+0.14%
1846	818	+2.67%
1851	815	−0.07%
1856	790	−0.62%
1861	769	−0.54%
1866	753	−0.42%
1872	691	−1.42%
1876	732	+1.45%
1881	702	−0.83%
1886	849	+3.88%
1891	734	−2.87%
1896	776	+1.12%
1901	814	+0.96%

Year	Pop.	±% p.a.
1906	887	+1.73%
1911	991	+2.24%
1921	997	+0.06%
1926	1,240	+4.46%
1931	1,513	+4.06%
1936	1,508	−0.07%
1946	1,649	+0.90%
1954	2,678	+6.25%
1962	4,058	+5.33%
1968	7,298	+10.28%
1975	12,945	+8.53%
1982	17,166	+4.11%
1990	19,754	+1.77%
1999	21,364	+0.87%
2007	21,736	+0.22%
2012	20,346	−1.31%
2017	21,379	+1.00%
2023	22,544	+0.89%

Source: EHESS and INSEE (1968–2023)

== Economy ==
Gif-sur-Yvette is situated in the "Science Valley" of the Yvette River. Numerous research organisations exist in the area, such as the French National Centre for Scientific Research (Centre national de la recherche scientifique, CNRS), the French Alternative Energies and Atomic Energy Commission (Commissariat à l'énergie atomique et aux énergies alternatives, CEA), Supélec (École supérieure d'électricité), the LGEP (Laboratoire de génie électrique de Paris, associated with Supélec), SOLEIL Synchrotron (Source Optimisée de Lumière d'Energie Intermédiaire du LURE) and the Institute of Plant Biotechnology. Further, Gif-sur-Yvette is home to the former Centre national d'étude et de formation of the National Police.

The General Confederation of Labour (CGT) operates, since 1950, a "permanent central college" in Gif-sur-Yvette, the Benoît Frachon Centre, situated along the Yvette River.

== Transport ==
Gif-sur-Yvette is served by two stations on Paris RER line B: Gif-sur-Yvette and Courcelle-sur-Yvette. Like all the train stations on this line, one train goes towards/past Paris (Aéroport Charles de Gaulle 2 TGV or Mitry-Claye) and the other goes towards the other end of the line : Saint-Rémy-lès-Chevreuse. The trains arrive generally at 15-minute intervals.

== People ==
- Louis Sédilot (1599–1672), early Quebec colonist
- Juliette Adam (1836–1936), founder of the Nouvelle Revue (1879) and operator of a famous literary club during the Third Republic.
- The Duke and Duchess of Windsor's former country home, Le Moulin de la Tuilerie, a sprawling dwelling created from an old mill and a number of barns, is located on the outskirts of town. The couple bought the buildings in 1952 from the artist Drian, and were weekend residents for some 20 years. It was the only home they owned together. It has been restored as three individual holiday homes which are available to rent through the Landmark Trust and Owners Direct in the UK. Among the Windsors' famous guests at the house were Richard Burton and Elizabeth Taylor, Cecil Beaton and Marlene Dietrich.
- The artist Fernand Léger died on 17 August 1955 in the house where, in 1972, negotiations were held between Henry Kissinger and Le Duc Tho which led to the end of the Vietnam War.
- The actor Richard Bohringer lives in the town. His daughter, actress Romane Bohringer pursued her university studies here.
- The actress and super-model Noémie Lenoir is from Gif-sur-Yvette, in the l'Abbaye section.
- Well-known British chemists who have been working at the Institut de Chimie des Substances Naturelles at Gif include: Derek Barton, Hugh Felkin, Bob Crabtree and Steve Davies.
- The famous astrophysicist Hubert Reeves lived in La Hacquinière.

== Twin towns ==
- Olpe, Germany, since 2001

== See also ==
- Communes of the Essonne department
