= Saint-Aubin, Essonne =

Commune in Île-de-France, France

Saint-Aubin
- Commune
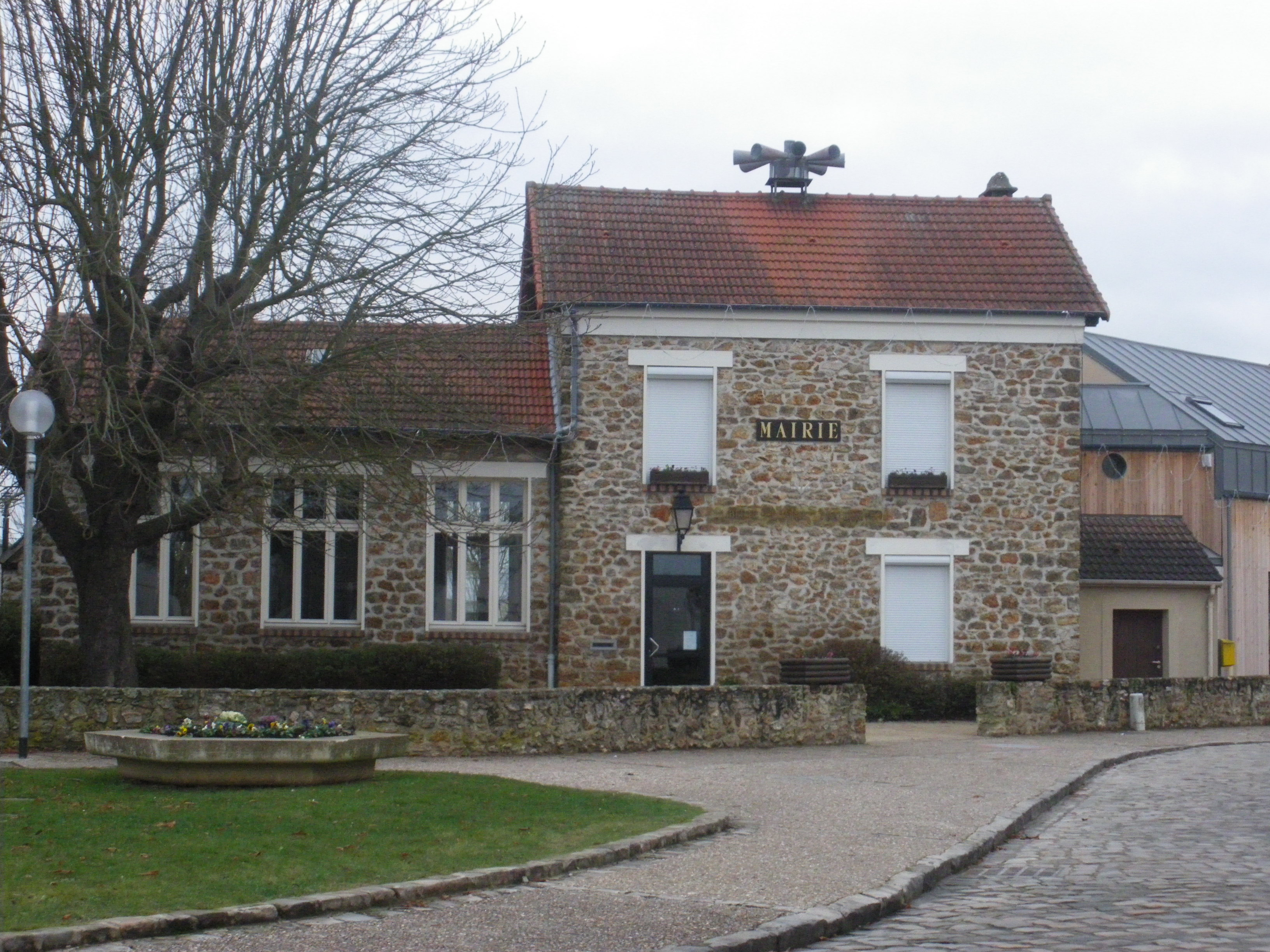
- Saint-Aubin Town hall
- Location of Saint-Aubin
- Location within France Location within Île-de-France (region)
- Coordinates: 48°42′55″N 2°08′28″E
- Country: France
- Region: Île-de-France
- Department: Essonne
- Arrondissement: Palaiseau
- Canton: Gif-sur-Yvette
- Intercommunality: CA Paris-Saclay

Government
  - Mayor (2020–2026): Pierre-Alexandre Mouret
- Area^{1}: 3.57 km^{2} (1.38 sq mi)
- Highest elevation: 164 m (538 ft)
- Lowest elevation: 90 m (300 ft)
- Population (2023): 661
  - Density: 185/km^{2} (480/sq mi)
- Time zone: UTC+01:00 (CET)
  - Summer (DST): UTC+02:00 (CEST)
- INSEE/Postal code: 91538 /91190
- ^{1} French Land Register data, which excludes lakes, ponds, glaciers > 1 km^{2} (0.386 sq mi or 247 acres) and river estuaries.

Saint-Aubin (French pronunciation: [sɛ̃.t‿obɛ̃]) is a commune in the Essonne department in Île-de-France in northern France.

Inhabitants of Saint-Aubin are known as Saint-Aubinois.

== Research activity ==
In the neighbourhood of Saclay and Orsay, Saint-Aubin is the home of two sites of the Commissariat à l'énergie atomique (CEA). The synchrotron SOLEIL, a collaboration between CEA and the Centre national de la recherche scientifique (CNRS), is also located here, south of the village.

== See also ==
- Communes of the Essonne department
