= Orge =

River in France

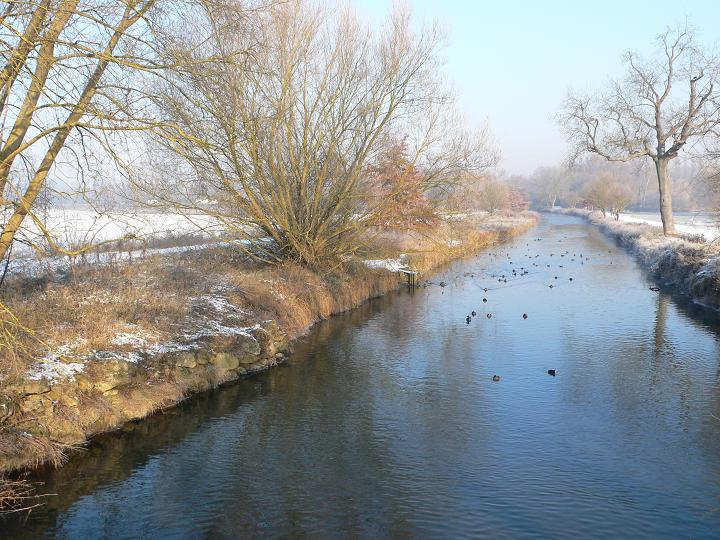

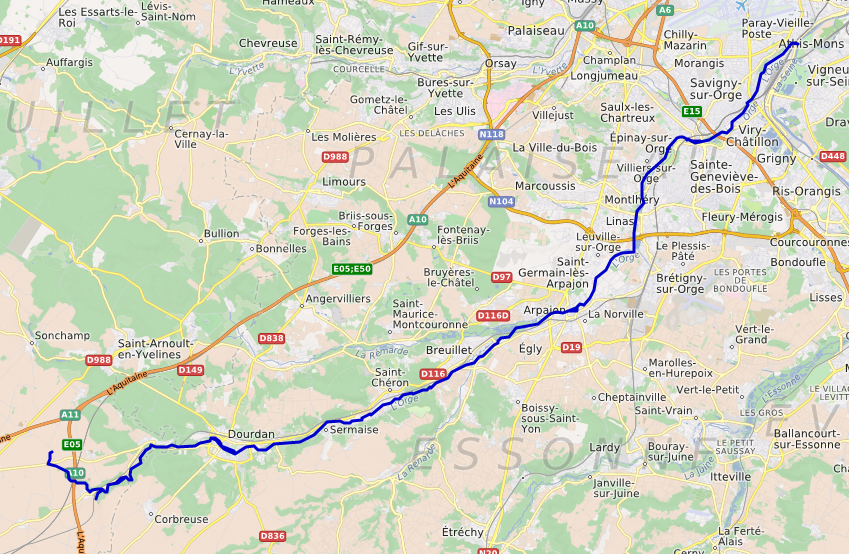

Location
- Country: France

Physical characteristics
- Mouth
  - location: Seine
  - coordinates: 48°42′38″N 2°24′14″E
- Length: 54 km (34 mi)

Basin features
- Progression: Seine→ English Channel

The Orge (French pronunciation: [ɔʁʒ]) is a 54.1-kilometre (33.6 mi) long river in France, left tributary of the Seine. Its source is in the village Saint-Martin-de-Bréthencourt. Its course crosses the départements of Yvelines and Essonne. It flows northwest through the towns of Dourdan, Saint-Chéron, Breuillet, Arpajon, Savigny-sur-Orge, and Viry-Châtillon, finally flowing into the Seine in Athis-Mons, south of Paris. The towns located on the banks of the river usually have s/ Orge added to their name (i.e. Épinay-sur-Orge, Longpont-sur-Orge, Villiers-sur-Orge). The Yvette is a tributary of the Orge.

== Promenade de l'Orge ==
Many of the local councils maintain parks on the banks of the river. A syndicat has been formed to link the parks of 32 communes. The result is a footpath that ends in Athis-Mons, where the Orge flows into the Seine. Bicycles are allowed on the footpath although pedestrians have right of way. Motorised vehicles are not allowed.

== Port-Aviation ==
In May 1909 a venue for aviation races and exhibitions, Port-Aviation, opened to the public in Viry-Châtillon as the world's first purpose-built aerodrome. The airfield, often referred to by the misnomers "Juvisy Airfield" or "Juvisy" due to its proximity to Juvisy-sur-Orge, was located at a point where the Orge forked into two branches, one of which ran along Port-Aviation's northwestern perimeter and the other across the northwestern, northern, and northeastern portions of the airfield itself. Flooding of the Orge that began in mid-January 1910 forced the closure of Port-Aviation and the evacuation of its hangars until March 1910. Although Port-Aviation operated as a civilian aviation venue until 1914 and as a military aviation training site during World War I, it closed and was abandoned during 1918 in part because it was prone to flooding by the Orge. A housing district also named Port-Aviation was constructed on the site of the former airfield between 1919 and 1933 and also suffered from flooding until 1932, when the Orge was canalized in the area and a pumping station was installed.

== Gallery ==
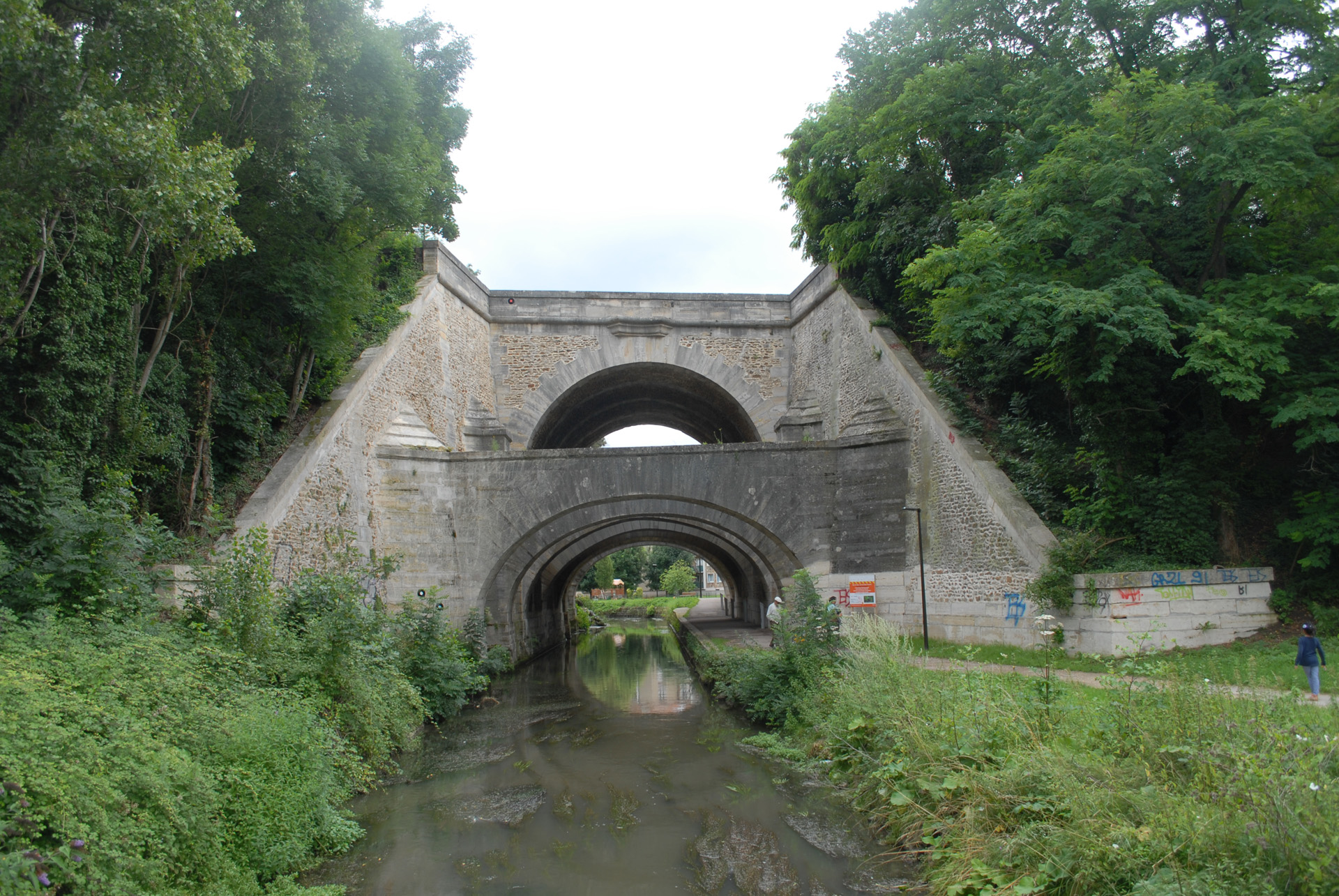
Viaduct over the Orge

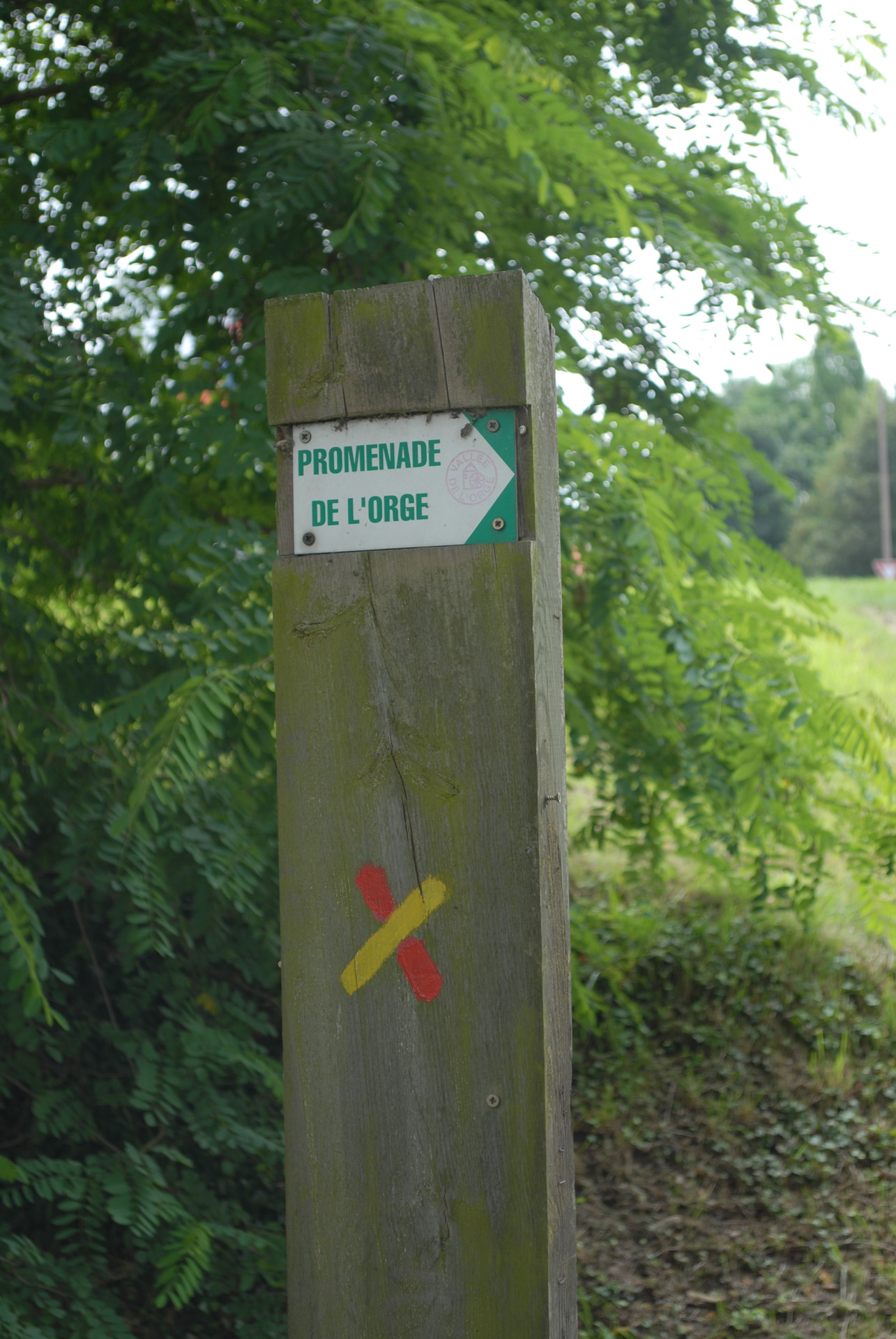
Signpost for the Promenade de l'Orge

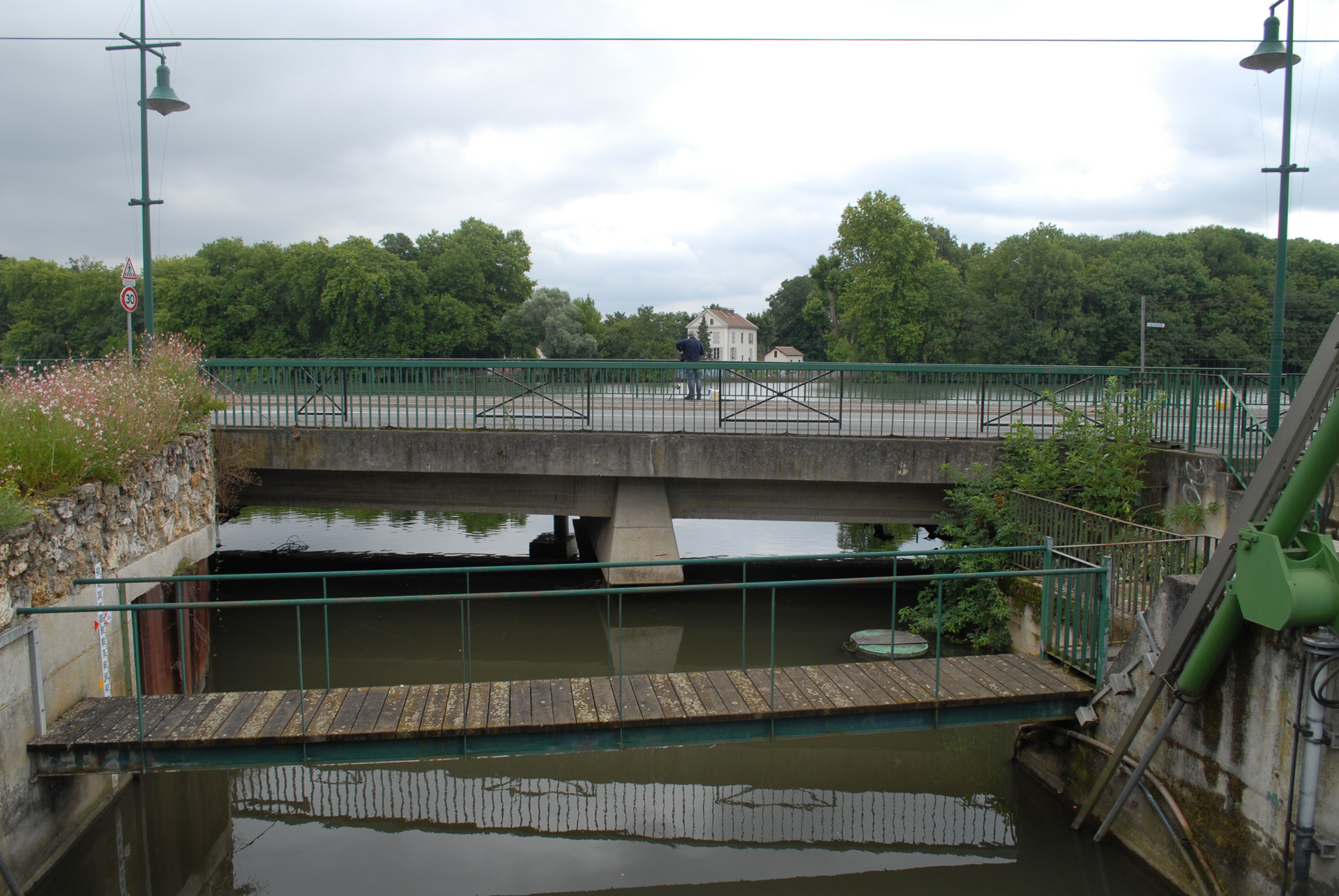
Confluence of the Orge and Seine in Athis-Mons
