= Igny, Essonne =

Commune in Île-de-France, France

Igny
- Commune
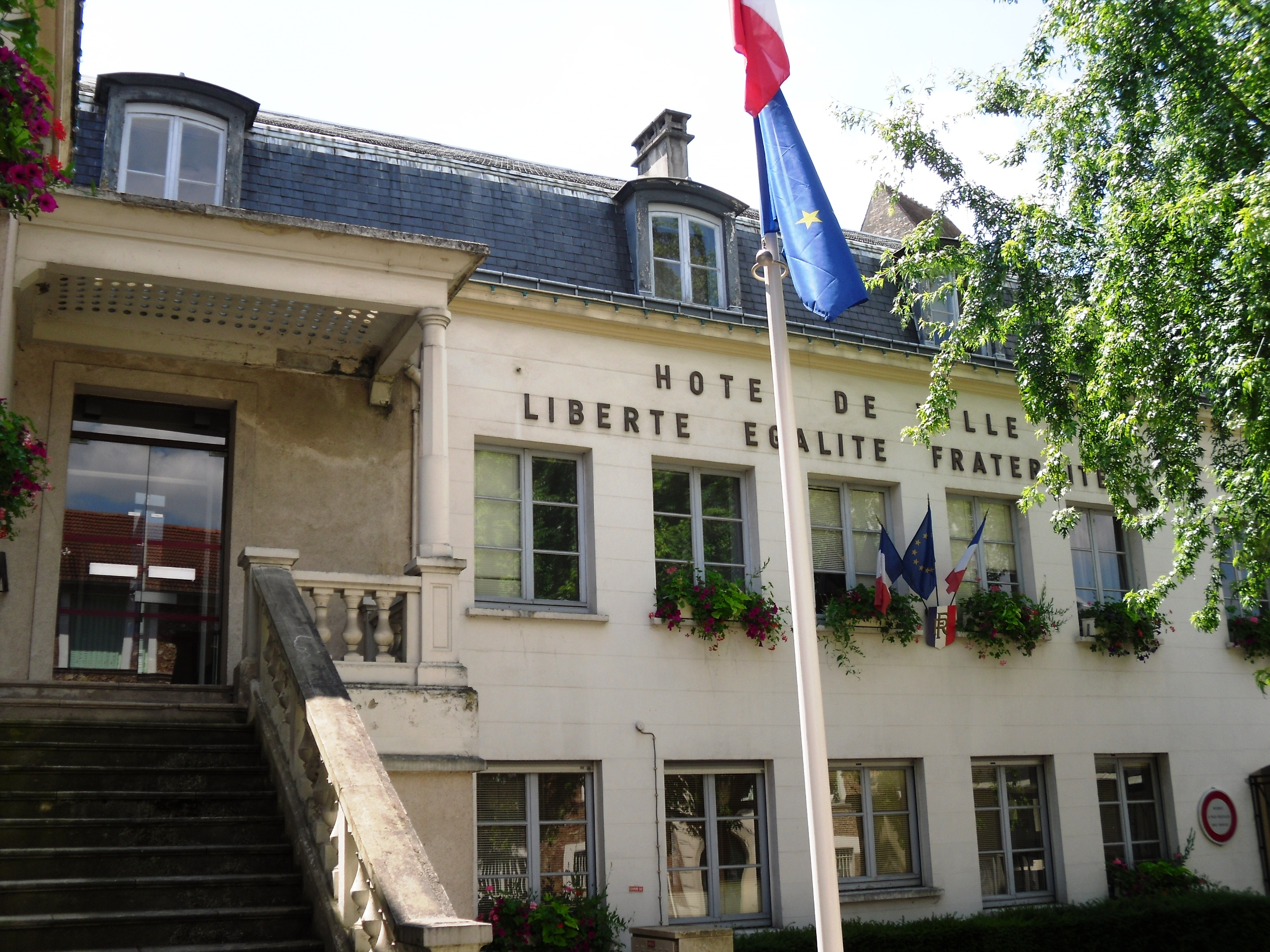
- The town hall of Igny

- Coat of arms
- Location of Igny
- Location within France Location within Île-de-France (region)
- Coordinates: 48°44′32″N 2°13′34″E
- Country: France
- Region: Île-de-France
- Department: Essonne
- Arrondissement: Palaiseau
- Canton: Palaiseau
- Intercommunality: CA Paris-Saclay

Government
  - Mayor (2020–2026): Francisque Vigouroux
- Area^{1}: 3.82 km^{2} (1.47 sq mi)
- Highest elevation: 154 m (505 ft)
- Lowest elevation: 62 m (203 ft)
- Population (2023): 10,833
  - Density: 2,840/km^{2} (7,340/sq mi)
- Time zone: UTC+01:00 (CET)
  - Summer (DST): UTC+02:00 (CEST)
- INSEE/Postal code: 91312 /91430
- ^{1} French Land Register data, which excludes lakes, ponds, glaciers > 1 km^{2} (0.386 sq mi or 247 acres) and river estuaries.

Igny (French pronunciation: [iɲi]) is a commune in the Essonne department in Île-de-France in northern France.

== Population ==
Inhabitants of Igny are known as Ignissois in French.

Historical population
Year	Pop.	±% p.a.
1968	7,794	—
1975	9,102	+2.24%
1982	9,235	+0.21%
1990	9,428	+0.26%
1999	9,381	−0.06%
2007	10,208	+1.06%
2012	10,573	+0.71%
2017	10,052	−1.01%
2023	10,833	+1.25%
Source: INSEE

== Education ==
Public preschools include:

- École Charles Perrault (preschool)
- Écoles Joliot-Curie

Public elementary schools include:

- École Jules Ferry

Groupe scolaire Jean-Baptiste Corot, a public school, has both preschool and elementary school levels.

Igny has one public junior high school, Collège Emile Zola.

There is a Roman Catholic school, Ensemble scolaire catholique sous contrat La Salle Igny, that has elementary through high school/sixth-form levels.

Area public high schools include:

- Lycée général et technologique du parc de Vilgénis in Massy
- Lycée Fustel de Coulanges in Massy
- Lycée Camille Claudel in Palaiseau
- Lycée International de Palaiseau Paris Saclay

== See also ==
- Communes of the Essonne department
