= Lozère station =

Railway station in France

Lozère
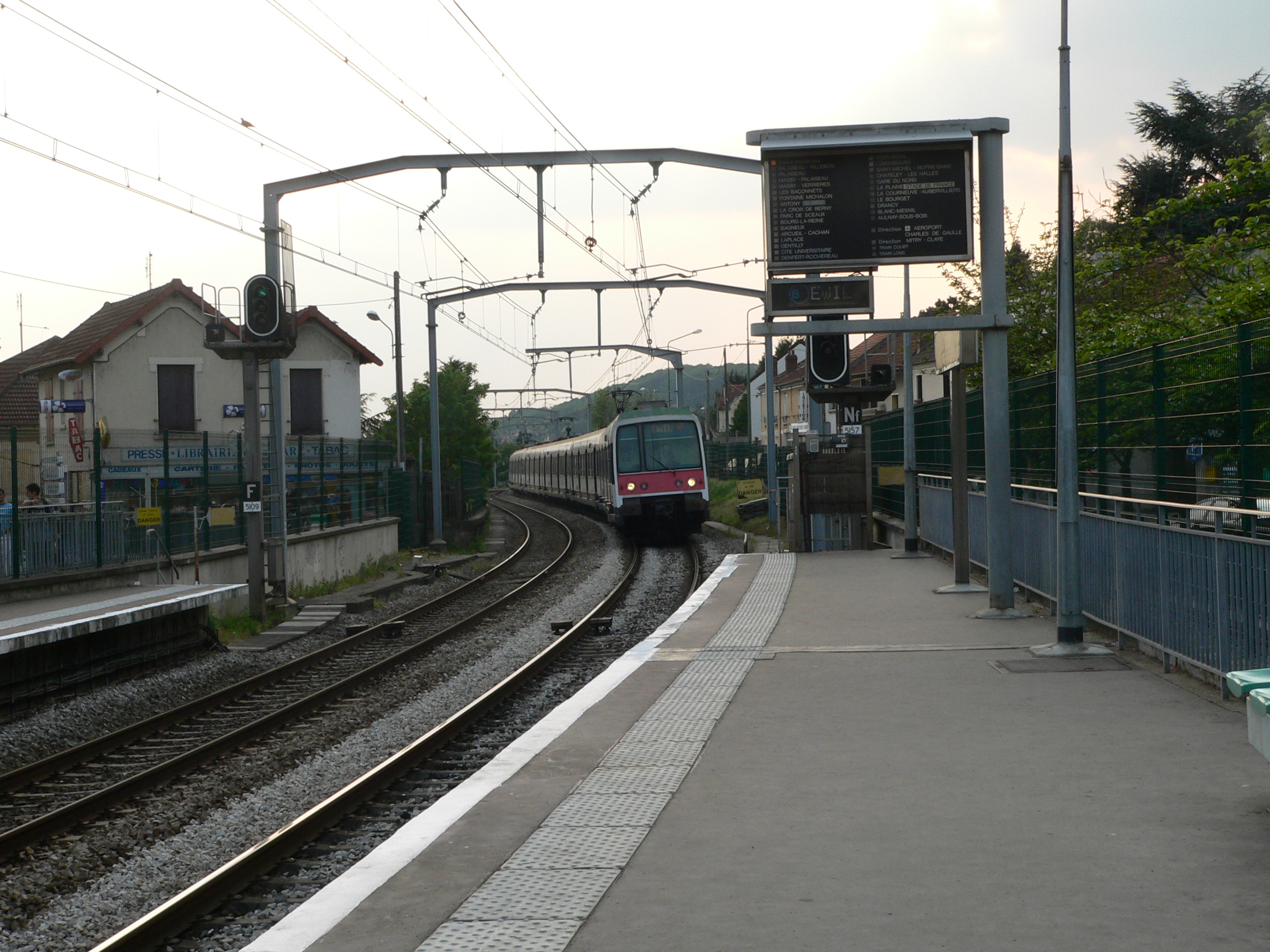
- Lozère station platforms

General information
- Location: Palaiseau; France
- Coordinates: 48°42′22″N 2°12′42″E
- Operator: RATP Group
- Line: Ligne de Sceaux
- Platforms: 2 side platforms
- Tracks: 2

Construction
- Structure type: At-grade
- Accessible: Yes, by request to staff

Other information
- Station code: 87758821
- Fare zone: 4

Services
Preceding station	RER	Following station
Palaiseau-Villebon towards Aéroport Charles de Gaulle 2 TGV or Mitry–Claye	RER B	Le Guichet towards Saint-Rémy-lès-Chevreuse
Location

Lozère station is one of the four RER B station of Palaiseau, near Paris, France.

It serves the École polytechnique university through a path with approximately 300 stairs.

== Other stations of Palaiseau ==
- Massy-Palaiseau
- Palaiseau
