= Jean-Éric =

Jean-Éric is a masculine given name. Notable people with the name include:

- Jean-Éric Pin, French mathematician and theoretical computer scientist
- Jean-Éric Vergne (born 1990), French racing driver
