= Canton of Palaiseau =

Canton of Essonne, France

Coordinates: 48.71°N 2.24°E

The canton of Palaiseau is an administrative division of the Essonne department, Île-de-France region, northern France. Its borders were modified at the French canton reorganisation which came into effect in March 2015. Its seat is in Palaiseau.

It consists of the following communes:

1. Igny
2. Orsay
3. Palaiseau
