= Hôtel de Ville, Palaiseau =

Town hall in Palaiseau, France

Hôtel de Ville
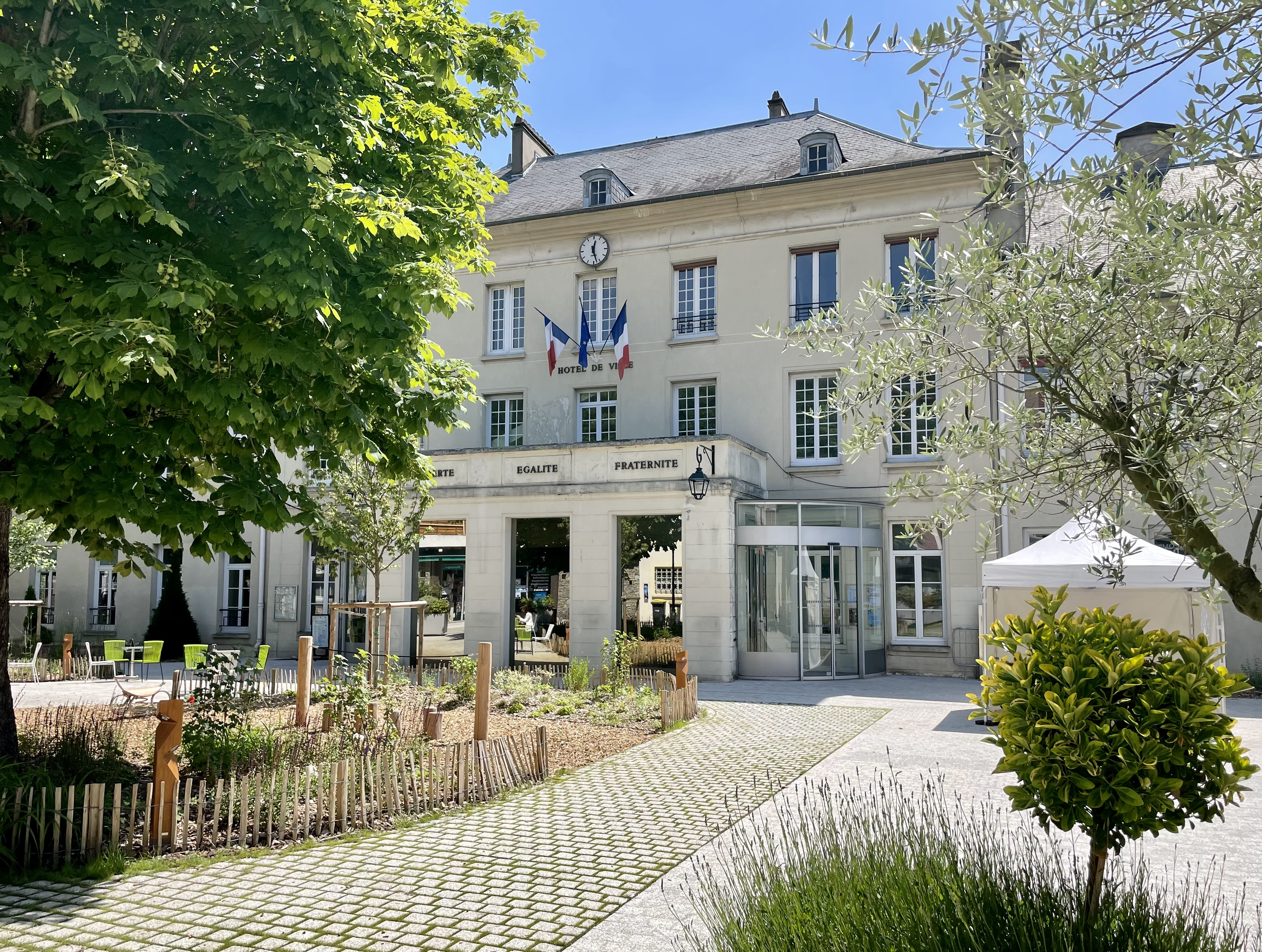
- The main frontage of the Hôtel de Ville in June 2024
- Interactive map of the Hôtel de Ville area

General information
- Type: City hall
- Architectural style: Neoclassical style
- Location: Palaiseau, France
- Coordinates: 48.7145°N 2.2457°E
- Completed: 1770

Design and construction
- Architect: Pierre Alexandre Danjan

The Hôtel de Ville (French pronunciation: [otɛl də vil], City Hall) is a municipal building in Palaiseau, Essonne, in the southwestern suburbs of Paris, standing on Rue de Paris.

== History ==
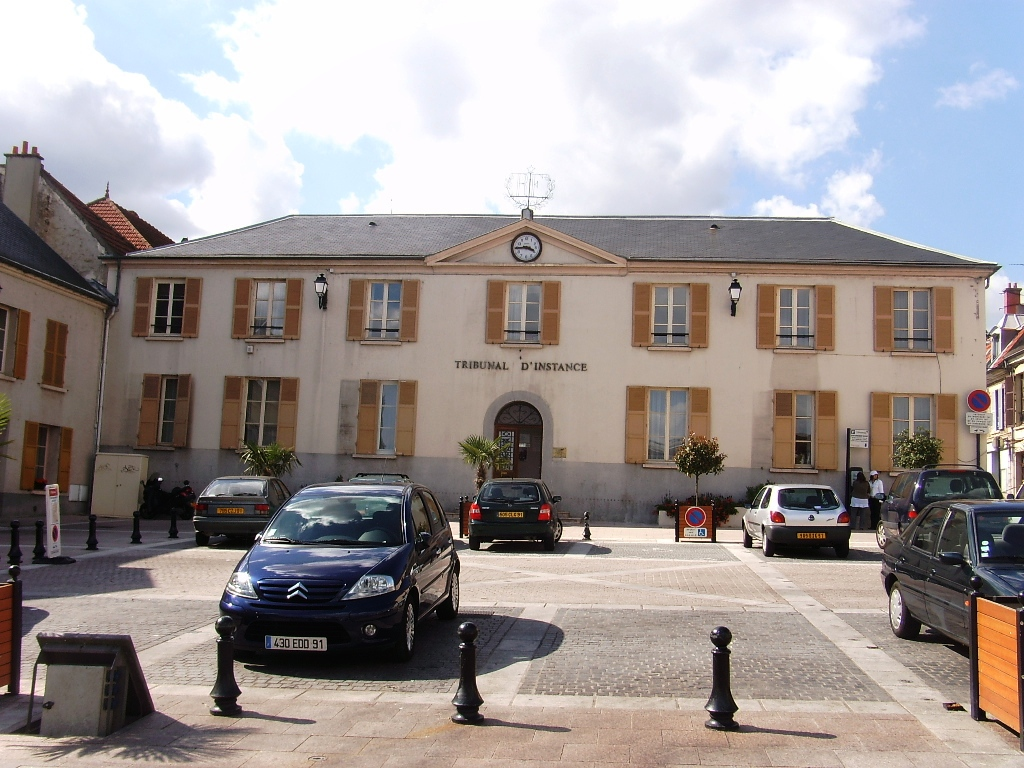
The old town hall

Following the French Revolution, the town council initially met in the home of the mayor at the time. This arrangement continued until the early 1860s, when the council decided to commission a dedicated town hall. The site they selected was on the west side of the town square, adjacent to Rue Voltaire. The new building was designed in the neoclassical style, built in brick with a cement render and was completed in 1864.

The design involved a symmetrical main frontage of seven bays facing onto the square. The central bay featured a round headed doorway on the ground floor and a casement window with shutters on the first floor. The other bays were fenestrated in a similar style. At roof level, there was a cornice and a pediment, with a clock in the tympanum, over the central bay. Internally, the Salle du Conseil (council chamber) was on the ground floor and the municipal offices were on the first floor. After the building was no longer required for municipal purposes it was converted for judicial use as the Tribunal d'Instance (district court).

A statue to commemorate the life of the soldier, Joseph Bara, who died in the War in the Vendée, was cast in bronze by Thiébaut Frères and unveiled in front of the town hall by General Jean Thibaudin, on 11 September 1881. The town hall was again the centre of activity when Palaiseau was liberated by the French 2nd Armoured Division, commanded by General Philippe Leclerc, on 25 August 1944 during the Second World War.

In the late 1940s, following significant population growth, the council led by the mayor, Roger Jardin, decided to acquire a more substantial municipal building. The building they selected was the Maison Tronchet. The building was commissioned by the lawyer, François Denis Tronchet. The site he selected was on the east side of the Rue de Paris. The house was designed by Pierre Alexandre Danjan in the neoclassical style, built in brick with a cement render finish and was completed in 1770. Tronchet worked as counsel for the defence to Louis XVI during his trial before the National Convention in December 1792. He then retreated to the house during the Reign of Terror when legal proceedings were brought against him.

The design involved a symmetrical main frontage of seven bays facing onto Rue de Paris. There was a doorway in the central bay and the building was fenestrated with casement windows on all three floors. At roof level, there was an entablature, a cornice and three dormer windows. By the early 20th century, the house had been opened to the public as a visitor attraction.

After the council acquired the building for FFr13.5 million in 1950, the conversion works included the installation of a three-bay single storey porch and the creation of a Salle du Conseil (council chamber). Additional wings were then added in the mid-1970s.
