= Laura Chaubard =

French mathematician (born 1980)

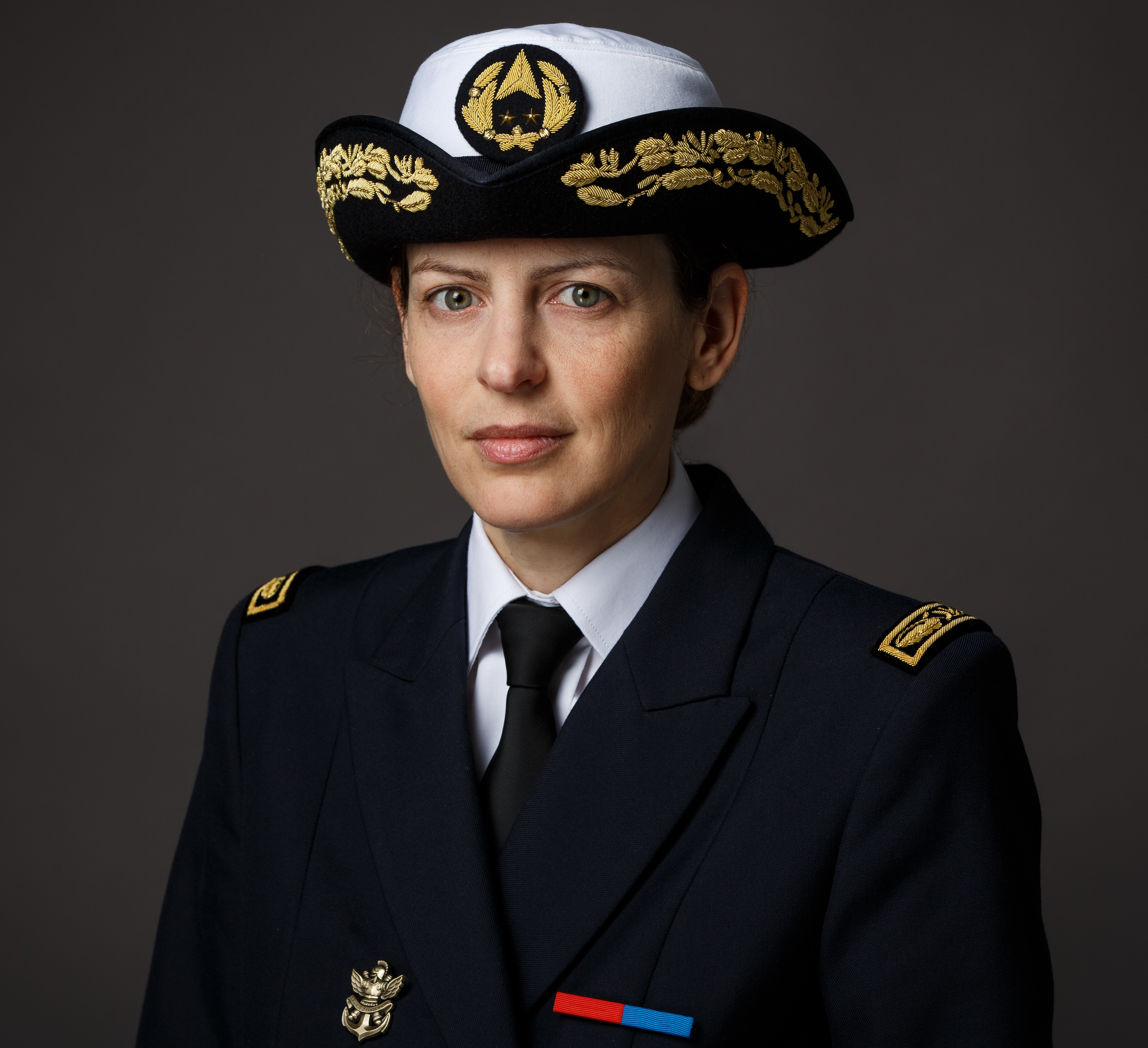
- Laura Chaubard in 2023

Director of the École polytechnique
- Incumbent
- Assumed office 17 September 2023
- Preceded by: Éric Labaye

Personal details
- Born: 1980 (age 45–46) France
- Education: Lycée Henri-IV; Lycée Janson-de-Sailly
- Alma mater: École polytechnique Paris Diderot University

Laura Chaubard (born 1980) is a French mathematician and the Director General of the École polytechnique, the first woman to hold this position at the engineering school. She is also the interim chair of the school's board of directors since 2023.

== Education and career ==
Laura Chaubard joined the École polytechnique in 1999. She received a PhD in mathematics in 2007 from Paris Diderot University working on Algebraic methods for formal languages under the supervision of Jean-Éric Pin.

In 2006, she joined the French Directorate General of Armament (DGA) as an expert in artificial intelligence, where she notably contributed to the organization of the ESTER 2 campaign for evaluating several automatic analysis systems (transcription, segmentation, named entity recognition) of audio documents in French. Becoming the information system architect for intelligence in 2010, she was appointed in February 2013 as the head of the strategic SME office, and then responsible for budget programming from January to August 2017, always at the DGA.

On August 28, 2017, Laura Chaubard was appointed innovation advisor to the office of the French Minister of the Armed Forces, Florence Parly. She notably contributed to the creation of the Définvest fund, an investment fund aimed at supporting strategic companies for the defense sector in France.

During the French Council of Ministers on October 5, 2022, she was appointed Director General of the École Polytechnique, becoming the first woman to hold this position. On September 17, 2023, she was appointed acting chair of the Board of Directors of the École Polytechnique.

== Awards and honors ==
- Ordre national du Mérite (2017)
- Knight of the Legion of Honour (2021)
