= Jean-Éric Pin =

French computer scientist

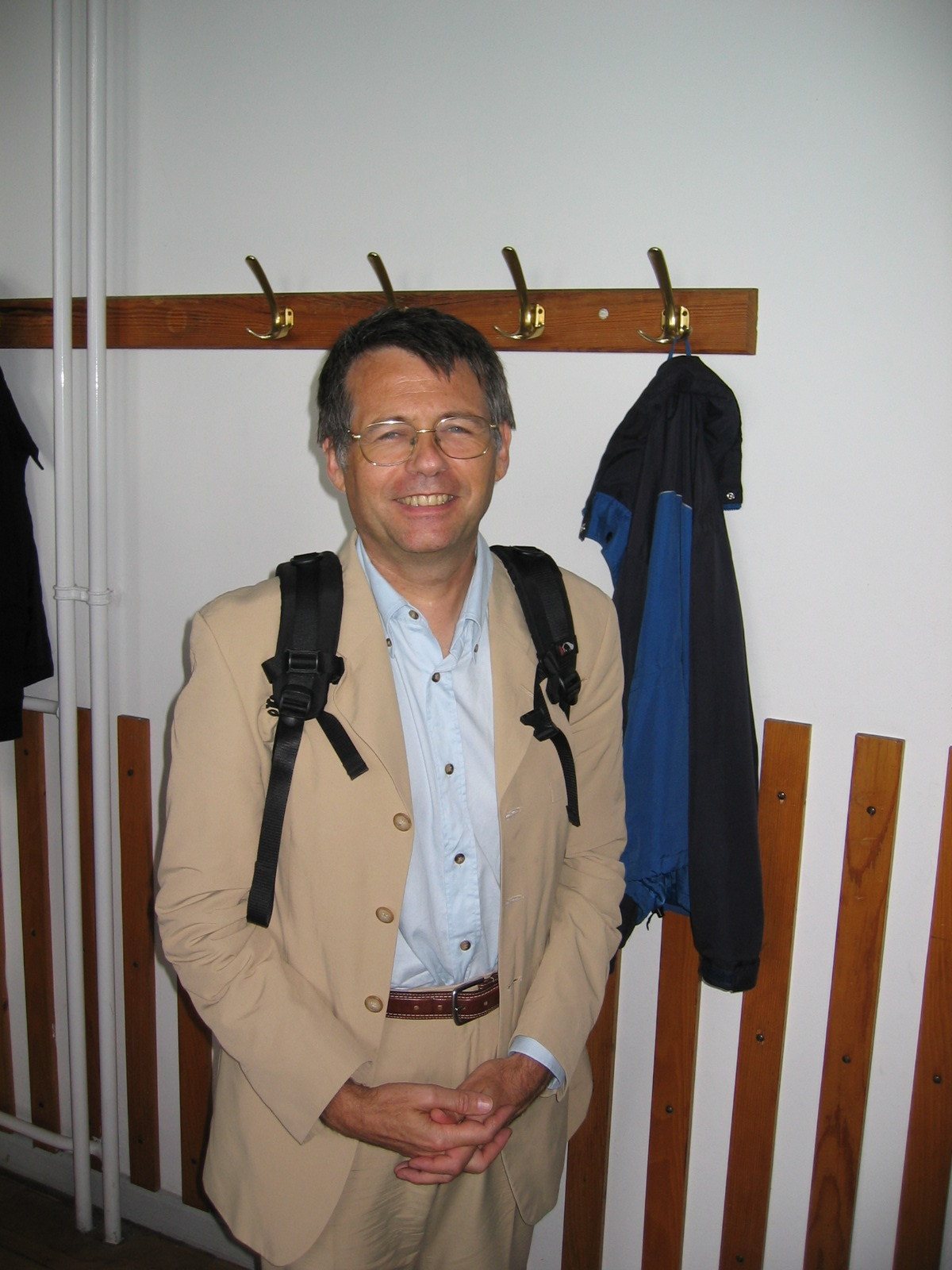
- Pin in 2004
- Education: ENS Cachan; Pierre and Marie Curie University
- Known for: Algebraic automata theory
- Scientific career
- Fields: Formal language theory Semigroup theory Combinatorics
- Doctoral advisor: Jean-François Perrot
- Doctoral students: Laura Chaubard

Jean-Éric Pin is a French mathematician and theoretical computer scientist known for his contributions to the algebraic automata theory and semigroup theory. He is a CNRS research director.

== Biography ==
Pin earned his undergraduate degree from ENS Cachan in 1976 and his doctorate (Doctorat d'état) from the Pierre and Marie Curie University in 1981. Since 1988 he has been a CNRS research director at Paris Diderot University. In the years 1992–2006 he was a professor at École Polytechnique.

Pin is a member of the Academia Europaea (2011) and an EATCS fellow (2014). In 2018, Pin became the first recipient of the Salomaa Prize in Automata Theory, Formal Languages, and Related Topics.

== Notable Work ==
Pin is the author of the prominent textbook Varieties of Formal Languages on automata theory and formal language theory.
