= Palaiseau–Villebon station =

Railway station in Palaiseau, France

Palaiseau–Villebon
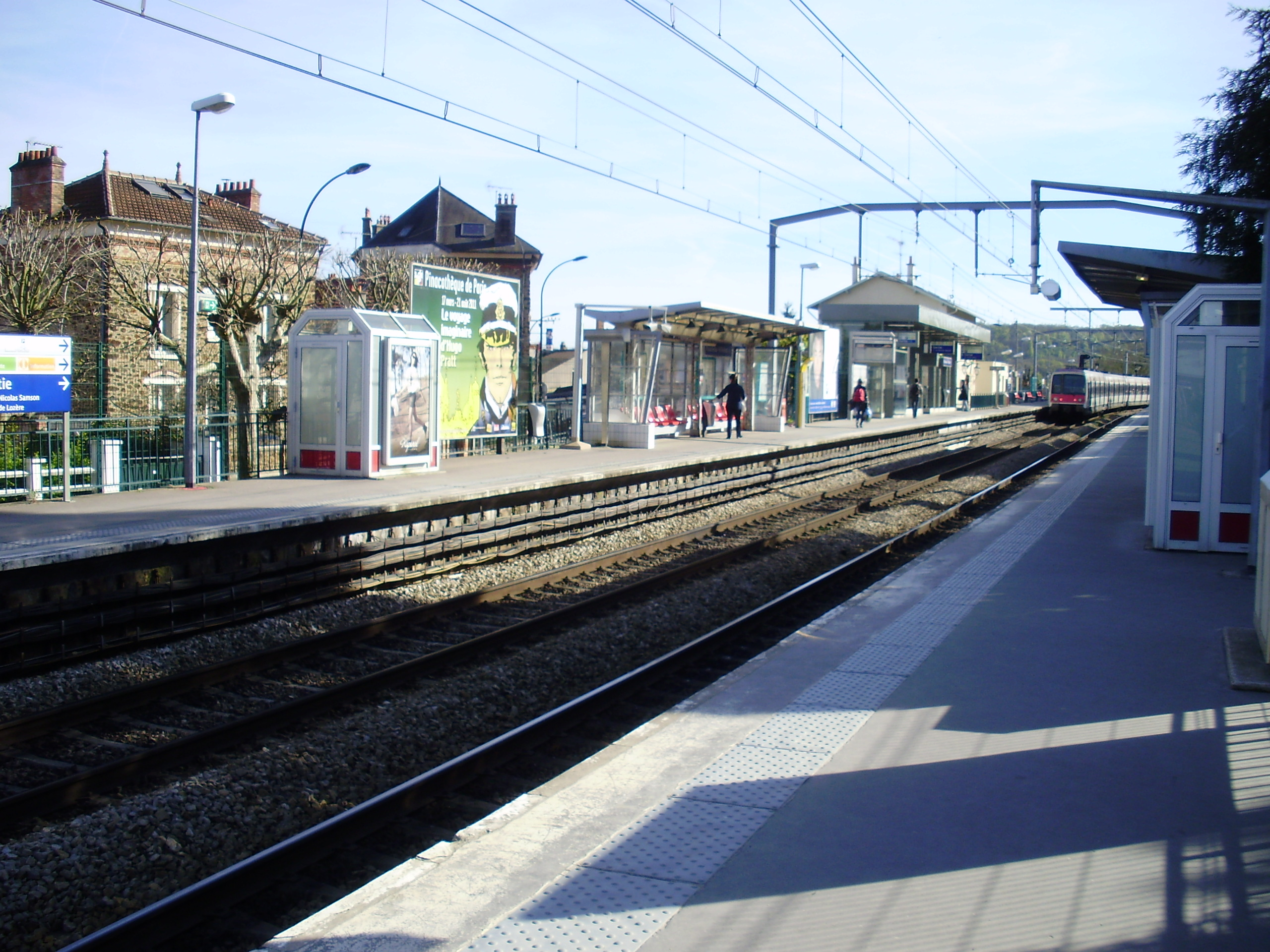
- Palaiseau-Villebon station platforms

General information
- Location: Palaiseau; France
- Coordinates: 48°42′28″N 2°14′14″E
- Operator: RATP Group
- Line: Ligne de Sceaux
- Platforms: 2 side platforms
- Tracks: 2

Construction
- Structure type: At-grade
- Accessible: Yes, by request to staff

Other information
- Station code: 87758813
- Fare zone: 4

Services
Preceding station	RER	Following station
Palaiseau towards Aéroport Charles de Gaulle 2 TGV or Mitry–Claye	RER B	Lozère towards Saint-Rémy-lès-Chevreuse
Location

Palaiseau–Villebon station is one of the four RER B stations of Palaiseau, near Paris, France.
