= Palaiseau =

Subprefecture and commune in Île-de-France, France

- Subprefecture and commune
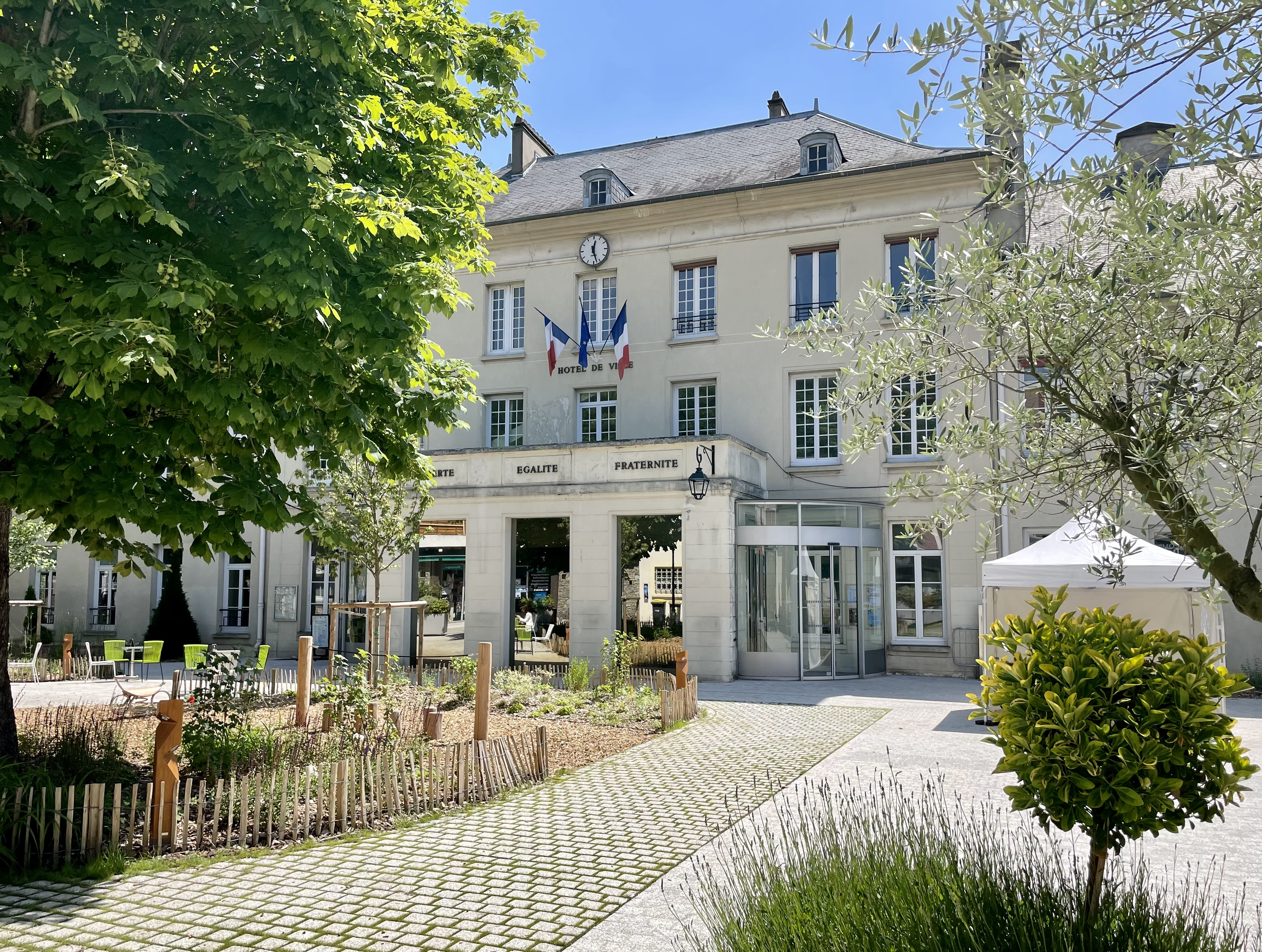
- The Hôtel de Ville

- Coat of arms

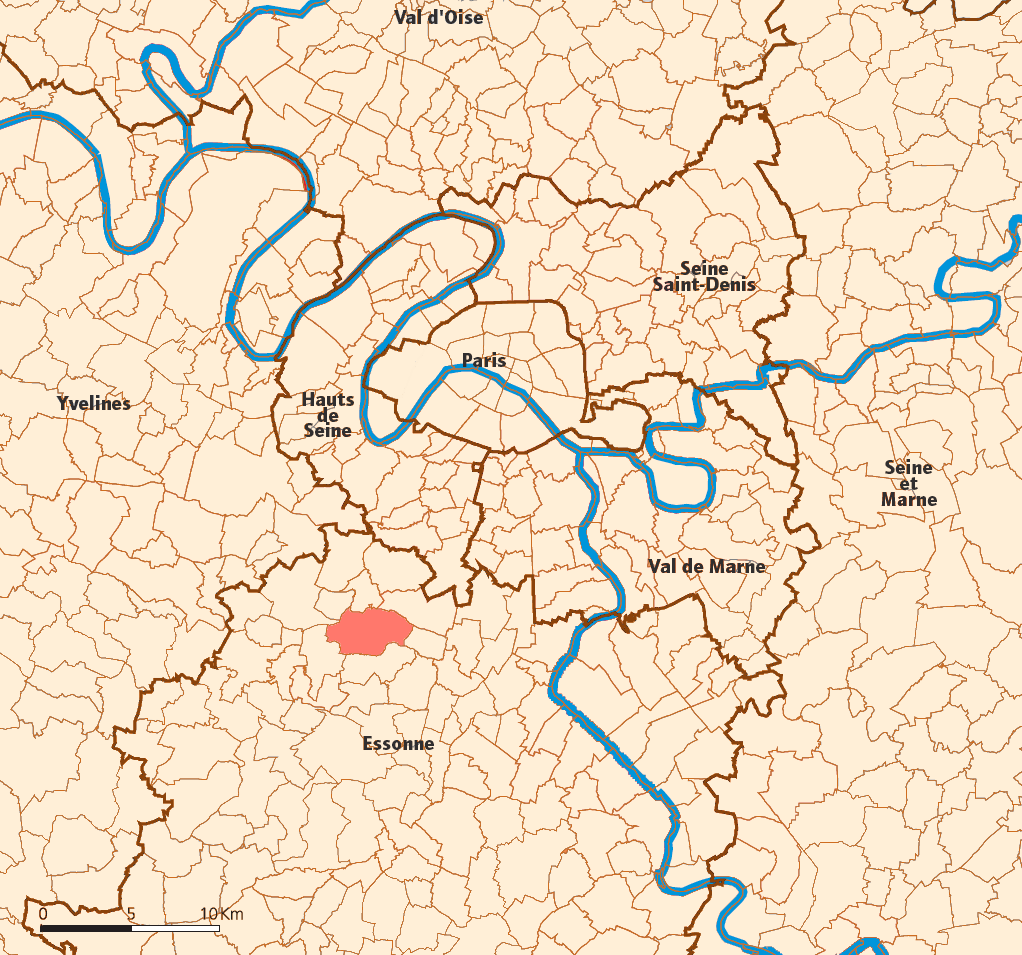
- Location (in red) within Paris inner and outer suburbs
- Location of Palaiseau
- Location within France Location within Île-de-France (region)
- Coordinates: 48°42′52″N 2°14′45″E
- Country: France
- Region: Île-de-France
- Department: Essonne
- Arrondissement: Palaiseau
- Canton: Palaiseau
- Intercommunality: CA Paris-Saclay

Government
  - Mayor (2020–2026): Grégoire de Lasteyrie
- Area^{1}: 11.51 km^{2} (4.44 sq mi)
- Highest elevation: 159 m (522 ft)
- Lowest elevation: 47 m (154 ft)
- Population (2023): 37,471
  - Density: 3,256/km^{2} (8,432/sq mi)
- Time zone: UTC+01:00 (CET)
  - Summer (DST): UTC+02:00 (CEST)
- INSEE/Postal code: 91477 /91120
- ^{1} French Land Register data, which excludes lakes, ponds, glaciers > 1 km^{2} (0.386 sq mi or 247 acres) and river estuaries.

Palaiseau (French pronunciation: [palɛzo]) is a commune in the southern suburbs of Paris, France. It is located 17 kilometres (10 1/2 miles) from the centre of Paris. Palaiseau is a sub-prefecture of the Essonne department and the seat of the Arrondissement of Palaiseau.

A ranking from the newspaper Le Parisien in 2018 ranks Palaiseau as the third town in Essonne where it is good to be a parent.

The town is home to several major French "Grandes écoles" on its territory: the École Polytechnique, the Institut d'optique Graduate School, ENSTA ParisTech, ENSAE ParisTech, the Institut Mines-Télécom, AgroParisTech as well as research centers Onera, Danone, Thales and EDF.

== History ==
Palaiseau was a royal domain in the 6th century then again in the 18th century on the important road from Chartres to Paris. The population grew from the 19th century with the arrival of the railway connecting the town to Paris. Palaiseau then became a vacation spot, writers such as George Sand, Alexandre Dumas, Charles Péguy built their villas near the stations.

The Hôtel de Ville was commissioned as a private house in 1770.

Inhabitants of Palaiseau are known as Palaisiens.

== Population ==
Historical population

Year	Pop.	±% p.a.
1793	1,639	—
1800	1,599	−0.35%
1806	1,740	+1.42%
1821	1,634	−0.42%
1831	1,633	−0.01%
1836	1,675	+0.51%
1841	1,716	+0.48%
1846	1,761	+0.52%
1851	1,846	+0.95%
1856	1,919	+0.78%
1861	1,912	−0.07%
1866	2,029	+1.19%
1872	1,949	−0.67%
1876	2,464	+6.04%
1881	2,409	−0.45%
1886	2,627	+1.75%
1891	2,701	+0.56%
1896	2,661	−0.30%
1901	2,808	+1.08%

Year	Pop.	±% p.a.
1906	3,024	+1.49%
1911	3,450	+2.67%
1921	4,555	+2.82%
1926	5,962	+5.53%
1931	7,264	+4.03%
1936	7,878	+1.64%
1946	8,029	+0.19%
1954	10,118	+2.93%
1962	16,326	+6.16%
1968	23,343	+6.14%
1975	28,716	+3.00%
1982	28,369	−0.17%
1990	28,395	+0.01%
1999	28,965	+0.22%
2007	30,149	+0.50%
2012	30,268	+0.08%
2017	35,514	+3.25%
2023	37,471	+0.90%

Source: EHESS and INSEE (1968-2023)

== Education ==
As of 2016, the primary schools in Palaiseau have 2,770 students. There are 12 public preschools (maternelles) and 10 public elementary schools.

Public secondary schools:

- Junior high schools: Collège César-Franck, Collège Charles-Péguy, Collège Joseph-Bara
- Senior high schools: Lycée professionnel Henri-Poincaré, Lycée Camille Claudel

The Institution Saint-Martin is a private school from preschool to high school.

=== Colleges and universities ===
ParisTech has a strong presence in Palaiseau, with four member institutes: the École Polytechnique (one of the most prestigious engineering schools in France), École nationale de la statistique et de l'administration économique, École nationale supérieure de techniques avancées, and Institut d'optique Graduate School which are now located in Palaiseau, on the Plateau de Saclay. The first three institutes are now grouped together in the Polytechnic Institute of Paris and the last one is a member of the Paris-Saclay University.

== Transport ==
Palaiseau is served by three stations on Paris RER line B: Palaiseau, Palaiseau – Villebon and Lozère (this last station is the closest to École Polytechnique). The station Massy-Palaiseau (RER B, RER C, T12 and also TGV, the French high-speed rail) is located in the nearby town of Massy.

== Twin towns ==
Palaiseau is twinned with Unna, Germany.

== See also ==
- Communes of the Essonne department
