= École polytechnique =

Public university in Palaiseau, France

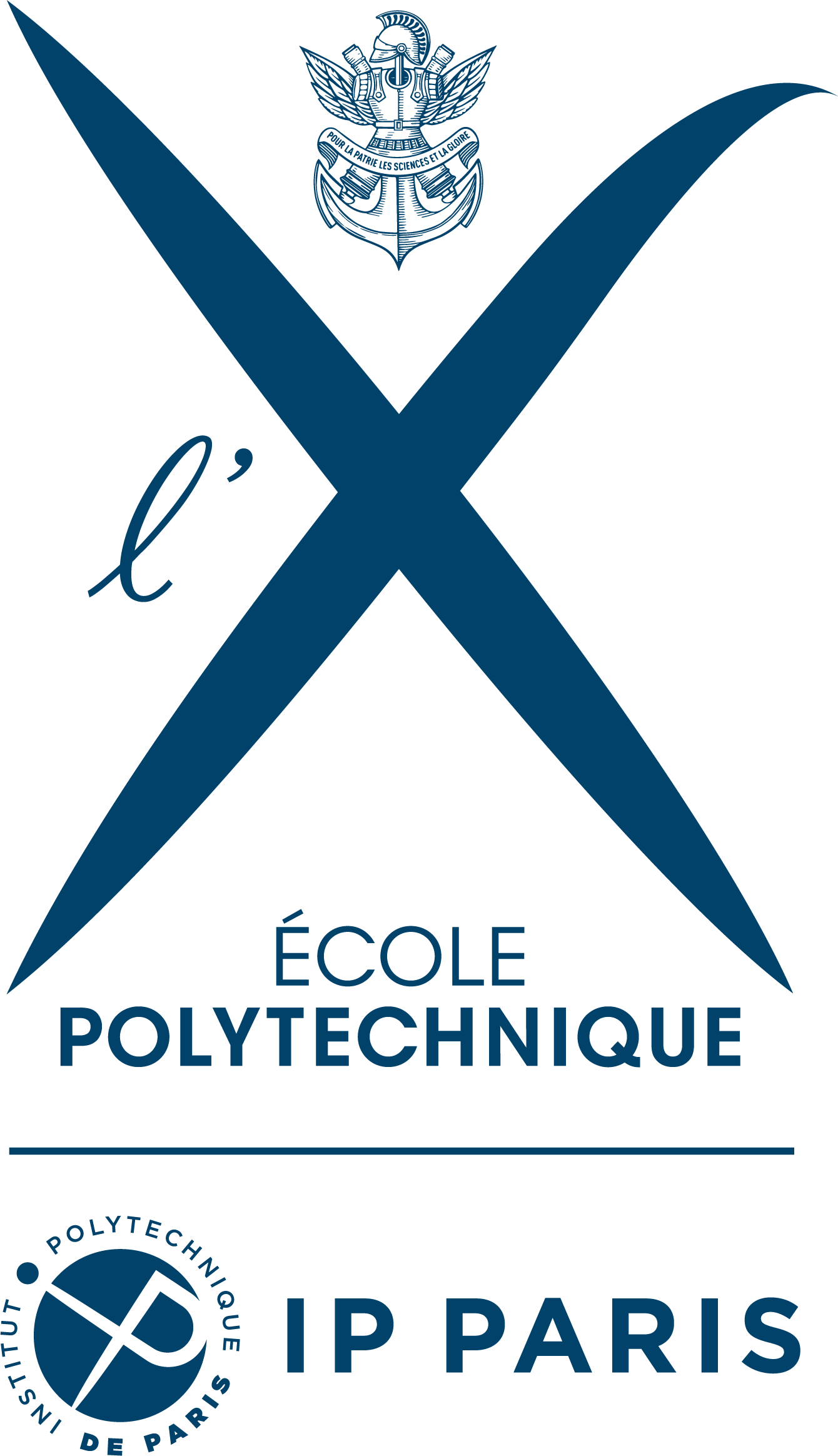
- Other name: l'X
- Former name: École centrale des Travaux publics (Central School of Public Works)
- Motto: Pour la Patrie, les Sciences et la Gloire
- Motto in English: For the Homeland, Science, and Glory
- Type: Grande école
- Established: 1794; 232 years ago
- Parent institution: Polytechnic Institute of Paris
- Academic affiliations: CGE, CDEFI
- President: Laura Chaubard (by interim)
- Director: Laura Chaubard
- Students: 3,370
- Undergraduates: 480
- Postgraduates: 2,000 engineer candidates 500 masters
- Doctoral students: 390
- Location: Palaiseau, France; 48.7125°N 2.2100°E
- Colors: Red & yellow
- Website: polytechnique.edu

Battalion of École polytechnique
- Bataillon de l'École polytechnique
- Founded: 28 September 1794
- Country: France
- Allegiance: France
- Type: Public research university
- Part of: French Armed Forces
- Mottos: Pour la Patrie, les Sciences et la Gloire
- Wars: Sixth Coalition World War I World War II
- Battle honours: Legion of Honour Croix de guerre 1914–1918 Croix de guerre 1939–1945 citation to the order of the army

Commanders
- Commanding Officer: General Armament Engineer Laura Chaubard
- Colonel of the Regiment: Cyrille Caron

École polytechnique (French pronunciation: [ekɔl pɔlitɛknik], lit. 'Polytechnic School'; also known as Polytechnique or l'X [liks]) is a grande école located in Palaiseau, France. It specializes in science and engineering and is a founding member of the Polytechnic Institute of Paris.

The school was founded in 1794 by mathematician Gaspard Monge during the French Revolution and was militarized under Napoleon I in 1804. It is still supervised by the French Ministry of Armed Forces. Originally located in the Latin Quarter in central Paris, the institution moved to Palaiseau in 1976, in the Paris-Saclay technology cluster.

French engineering students undergo initial military training and have the status of paid officer cadets. The school has also been awarding doctorates since 1985, masters since 2005 and bachelors since 2017.

Notable alumni of the school include mathematicians Augustin-Louis Cauchy, Gaspard-Gustave de Coriolis, Henri Poincaré, Laurent Schwartz and Benoît Mandelbrot, physicists such as Henri Becquerel, Nicolas Léonard Sadi Carnot, André-Marie Ampère and Augustin-Jean Fresnel, and economists Maurice Allais and Jean Tirole. French Marshals Joseph Joffre, Ferdinand Foch, Émile Fayolle and Michel-Joseph Maunoury were also Polytechnique engineering graduates.

== Name ==
Emblem of the school

Founded in 1794 as the École centrale des travaux publics (Central School of Public Works), the school initially provided teaching limited to technical knowledge. In 1795, the school was renamed the "École polytechnique" (Polytechnic School). The neologism polytechnique, appearing for the first time in a document published by Claude Prieur at the beginning of 1795, means "many arts", referring to the plurality of applied arts, sciences, technology, engineering and other academic subjects taught at the school.

Under the Restoration and the July Monarchy, the school was officially renamed the "École royale polytechnique". Under the First and the Second Empire, it was renamed the "École impériale polytechnique". The students, alumni, and graduates were called "Polytechnicians". The school was often simply called "Polytechnique".

The school has been nicknamed "l'X" since the middle of the 19th century. Two explanations have been put forward: one points to the two crossed cannons on the school's badge, while the other attributes it to the preeminence of mathematics in the training of Polytechnicians. According to L'Argot de l'X, published in 1894: "It is from the very importance given to the teaching of ana [analysis], the whole language of which is made up of x and y, that the nickname X came to designate Polytechnicians. Not all of them are mathematicians, but all have sufficient knowledge of differential and integral calculus for public service applications. Let us further say that in troubled times, such as [the Revolutions of] 1830 and 1848, this knowledge particularly helped them to avoid being confused with all the individuals who disguised themselves as Polytechnicians to give themselves the appearance of defenders of order. When they were encountered, they were asked the differential of sin x or log x, and if they did not answer, they were immediately locked up." However, in the 1994 edition, the origin of the nickname was again reported to be the crossing of the canons on the coat of arms. The nickname "X" also applies to Polytechnicians themselves; female Polytechnicians are sometimes nicknamed "Xettes" or "X7", which is pronounced [iksɛt].

In the late 19th and early 20th centuries, the school and its students and alumni were nicknamed "pipo" and "carva".

== History ==
=== Foundation and early years ===
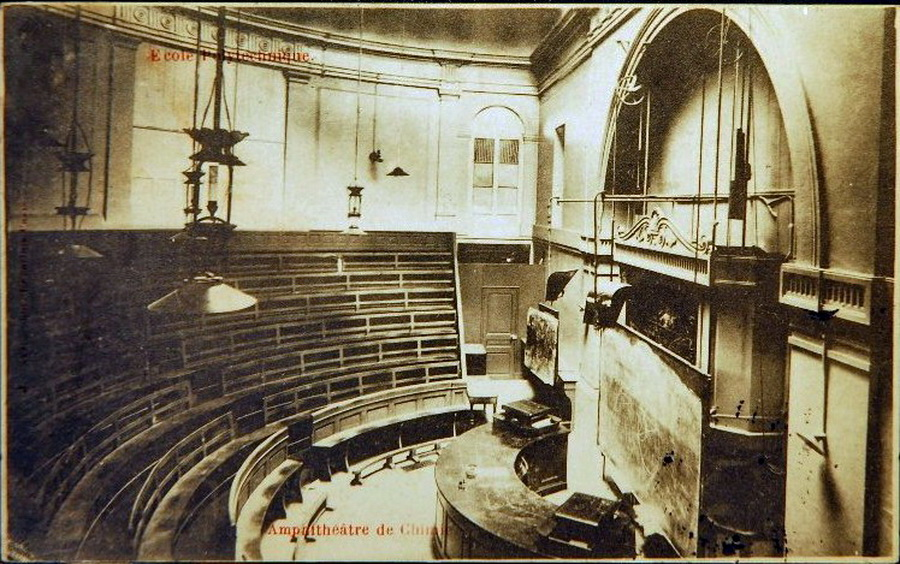
The chemistry auditorium in the old building in the Quartier Latin, photographed by Jules David in 1904

After the Revolution of 1789, the royal engineering schools were closed. The First Republic faced a shortage of engineers and military officers. Jacques-Élie Lamblardie, Gaspard Monge and Lazare Carnot, the founding fathers of the School, were charged with organizing a new "École centrale des travaux publics" (Central School of Public Works) which was officially created on 7 Vendémiaire, Year III (28 September 1794) and opened to students on 1 Nivôse, Year III (21 December 1794). The aim of the school was to train civil and military engineers. The school quickly welcomed 400 students of different levels. During the first three months, "revolutionary courses" were given in physics, mathematics and chemistry, after which they took exams to see if they could enter the civil service directly, or if they should continue their studies. The school was renamed the "École polytechnique" a year later. The change of name reflects the change of vocation of the school, which now prepares students for other specialized schools such as the École des mines and the École des ponts et chaussées. The curriculum lasted 3 years, the "regular courses" replaced the "revolutionary courses" and there were only 120 new students each year. The school was placed under the supervision of the Ministries of War and the Interior. A Journal Polytechnique (former name of "Journal de l'École polytechnique" ) was created in 1795. In 1799, the course was reduced from three to two years.

In 1805, Emperor Napoléon I transferred the school to Montagne Sainte-Geneviève in the Quartier Latin of central Paris to become a military academy and gave it its motto: Pour la Patrie, les Sciences et la Gloire (For the Nation, Science, and Glory). In 1804, after the militarization of the school, its atmosphere changed significantly from a rather free spirit to a meticulous bureaucracy. Militarization was motivated by Napoleon's favorable opinion of Polytechnicians who had contributed to the Egyptian expedition and by his admiration for Monge and Laplace. Militarization was accompanied by a specialization of teaching towards mathematics.

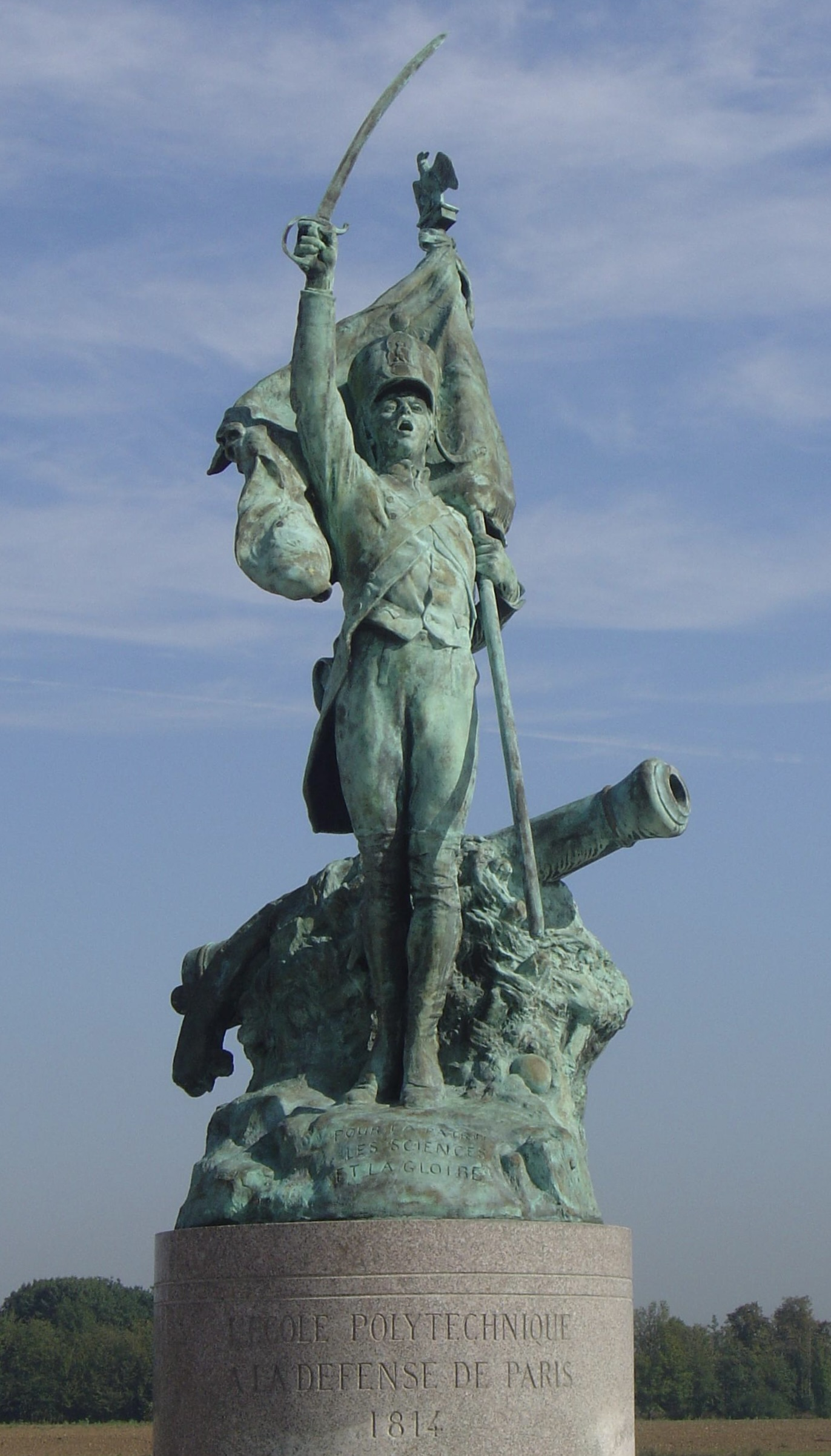
Statue in the courtyard commemorating the cadets of the school rushing to the defence of Paris in 1814. A replica was installed in West Point.

In 1814, students participated in the fighting to defend Paris against the Sixth Coalition. After the restoration of 1816, the number of students was reduced to about seventy-five and the 'military arts' course was abolished. In 1817, King Louis XVIII demilitarized the École polytechnique and placed it under the supervision of the Ministry of the Interior. In 1830, fifty students participated in the July Revolution. Various decrees were issued until 1832. Above all, the school came under the administration of the Ministry of War, thus regaining its military status. The republican ideal prevailed at the school, as shown by the active participation of students in the revolutions of 1830 and 1848.

=== The French Second Empire ===
Because of the tension between revolutionary ideas and the service of the state, the republican ideal gradually disappeared after 1851. Polytechnicians even found themselves on the side of the Versaillese when the Paris Commune was crushed in 1871. During the years 1871–1872, the number of students admitted per year doubled from 140 to 280. The Polytechnicians sought above all to strengthen their position in the spheres of power to compensate for their loss of influence in the technical field. While they could have turned to an engineering profession associated with industry, the Polytechnicians instead reinforced their sovereign vocation by joining the "state nobility" of the Second French Empire, whose origins, interests and convictions they gradually shared. The years 1860–1870 marked an important evolution since the school became more of a "conservatory of sciences" than a center of research and innovation, while extending its hold on the management of the industrial apparatus.

=== The World Wars ===
During World War I, the students were mobilized and the school building was transformed into a hospital. No national entrance exam was held in 1915. More than eight hundred students died during the war. In 1921, students of foreign nationalities were allowed to take the entrance exam for the first time. During the Second World War, the École polytechnique was transferred to Lyon in the free zone, lost its military status, and its Parisian buildings were given to the Red Cross. More than four hundred students died during the war (Free French, French Resistance, Nazi camps).

=== From post-war to today ===
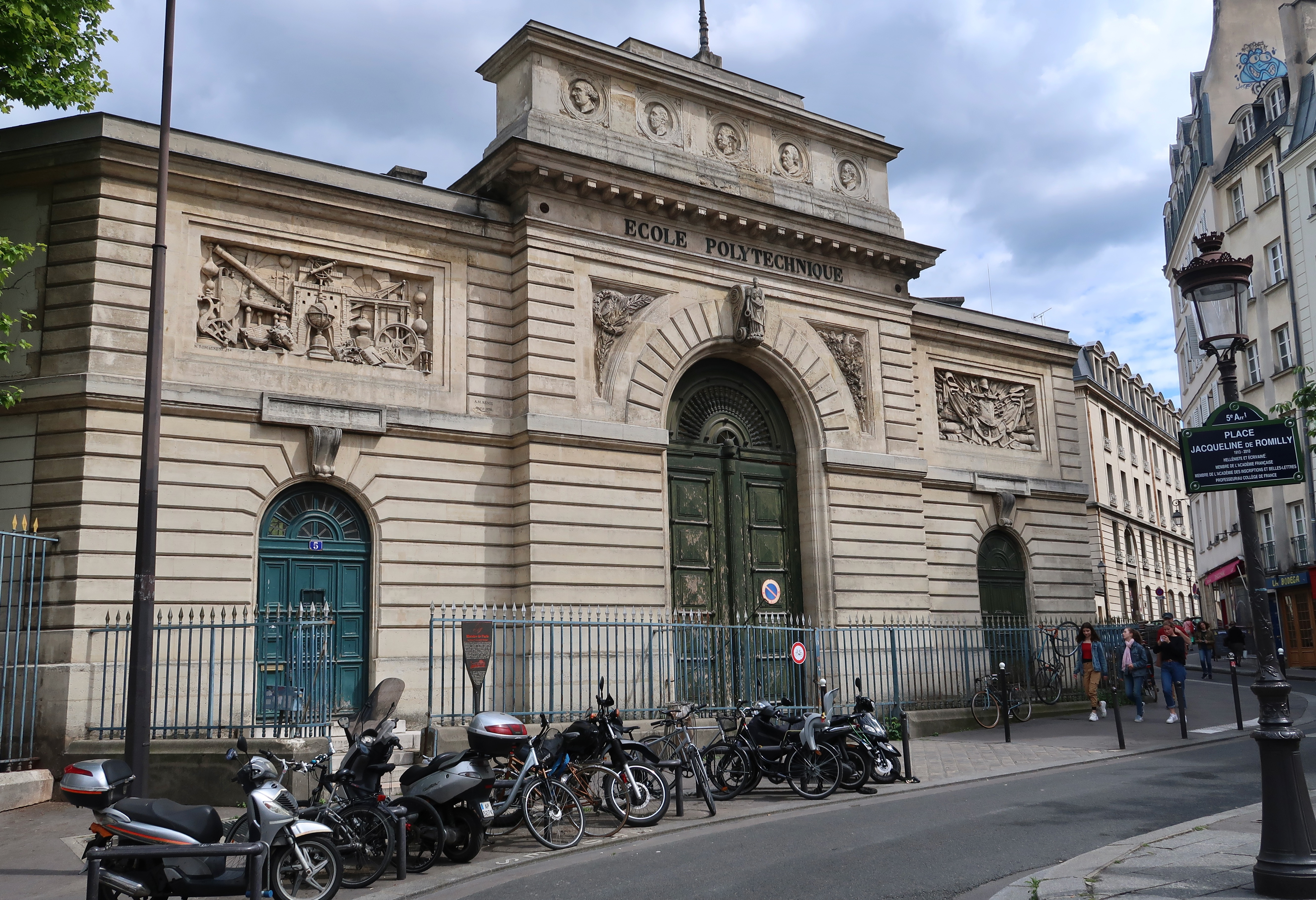
Pediment of historical buildings, rue Descartes in Paris

In 1944, the School was again placed under the administration of the Ministry of War. In 1970, the School became a state-sponsored civilian institution under the auspices of the Ministry of Defence. The first female students were admitted in 1972. One woman, Anne Chopinet, was class valedictorian. In 1976, the School moved from the center of Paris to Palaiseau, in the southern suburbs. In 1985, it began awarding doctoral degrees. In 1994, the bicentennial celebration was presided over by President François Mitterrand. In 1995, a new entrance exam was set up for international students and in 2000, the Ingénieur polytechnicien program was extended from 3 to 4 years.

== Locations ==
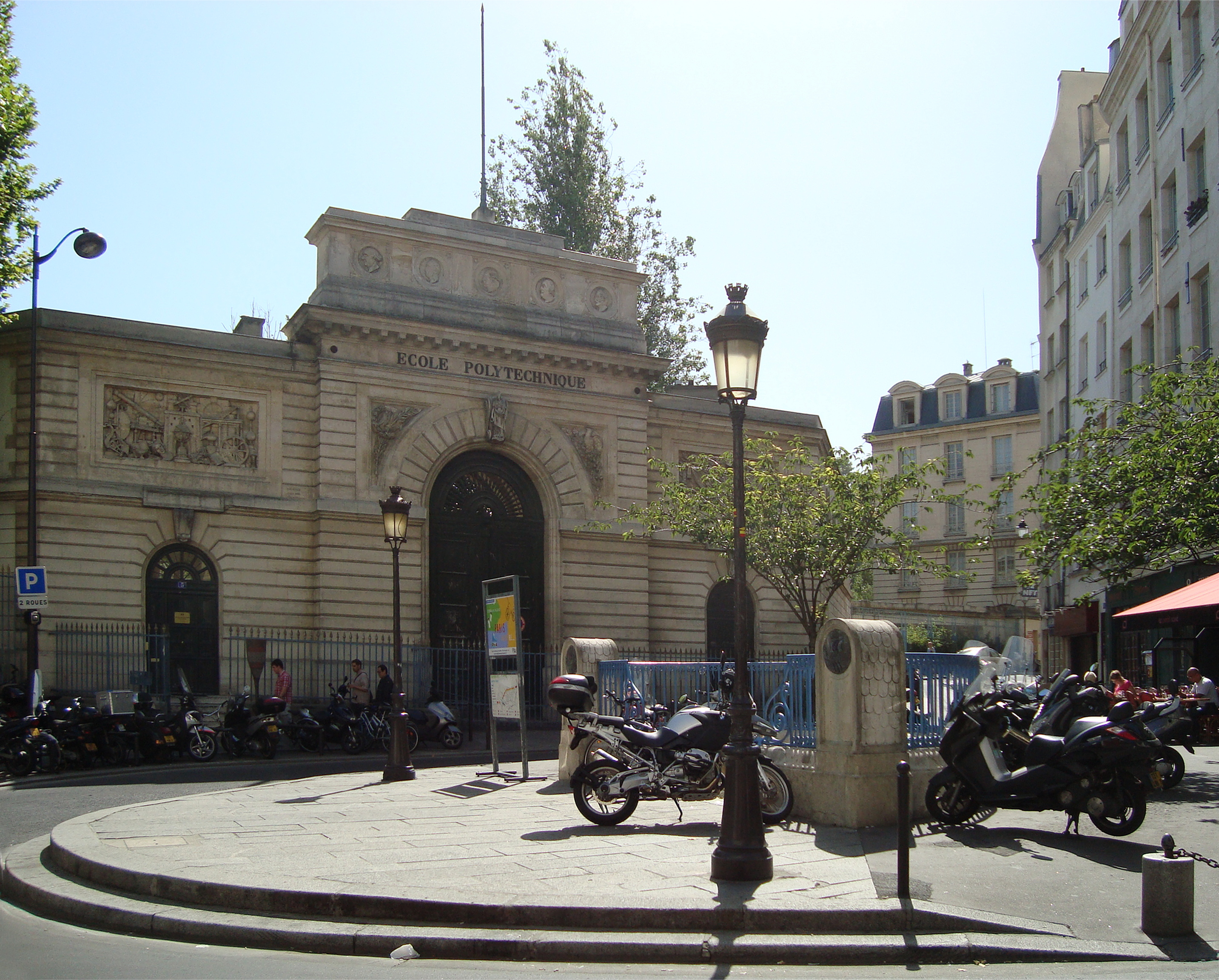
Historical entrance of the École polytechnique Paris campus at the junction of the rue de la Montagne Saint-Genevieve and rue Descartes

Map of the École polytechnique campus in Palaiseau

=== Early locations ===
In 1794, École polytechnique was first housed in the Palais Bourbon. A year later, it moved to the Hôtel de Lassay, a hôtel particulier in the 7th arrondissement of Paris.

=== Montagne Saint-Geneviève (1805–1976) ===
In 1805, when he placed the School under military administration, Napoleon transferred it to the Quartier Latin, in the former premises of the colleges of Navarre, Tournai and Boncourt, now the Ministry of Higher Education and Research. The Paris campus was located near the Panthéon, at 5 rue Descartes, and was nicknamed "Carva" by the students.

=== Palaiseau (from 1976) ===
Located in the suburbs of Paris, about 14 km (9 miles) from the city center, École polytechnique is a campus-based institution. It offers teaching facilities, student housing, dining and hospitality services, and a range of sports facilities dedicated to the 4,600 people who live on campus.

The nearest regional train station is Lozère (line B, zone 4 of the RER network). Several buses also connect École polytechnique to the Massy-Palaiseau RER station and Massy TGV station. The future Paris Métro Line 18 will stop at an aerial station near the campus.

The campus is close to other scientific institutions in Saclay (Commissariat à l'énergie atomique et aux énergies alternatives), Orsay (Paris-Saclay University) and Bures (Institut des hautes études scientifiques and some laboratories of the Centre national de la recherche scientifique).

== Organization and administration ==
=== Specific status ===
The Polytechnique color guard at the 2010 Bastille Day Military Parade

École polytechnique is an institution of higher education under the supervision of the French Ministry of Defence, through the General Directorate for Armament (administratively speaking, it is a national public establishment of an administrative character). It has a dual status, being an engineering school that trains civilian engineers and scientists, but also officers for the three French armies. The aim is to provide the French state with a scientific and technical elite. The number of graduates becoming civil servants and officers has weakened since 1950: today, only 10 to 20% of the school's students join the ranks of the administration or the army, while 20% go into research and the rest into engineering or management.

The school is headed by a general officer (since 2012, by a Senior General Engineer of Armament, whereas previous directors had all been generals of the French Armed Forces), and employs military personnel in leadership, administrative, and sports training positions. French undergraduate Polytechnicians, both male and female, are cadets and have to go through a period of military training before beginning their studies. However, the military dimension of the school faded over time, with a reduced period of preliminary military training, and fewer students choosing a career as an officer.

Since the abolition of the 'internal uniform' in the mid-1980s, students no longer wear uniforms on campus. On special occasions, such as the military parade on the Champs-Élysées on Bastille Day, conferences, ceremonies, and other events on campus, Polytechnicians wear the 19th-century-style Grand Uniforme, including a bicorne.

=== Activities and teaching staff ===
École polytechnique has a general engineering curriculum at the undergraduate and graduate levels, as well as a doctoral school. In addition to the faculty coming from its local laboratories, it employs many researchers and professors from other institutions, including laboratories such as CNRS, CEA, and INRIA, as well as from the École Normale Supérieure and nearby institutions such as the Institut d'Optique, and the Université Paris-Sud, thus creating a varied and high-level teaching environment.

Contrary to French public universities, the teachers at École polytechnique are not civil servants (fonctionnaires) but contract employees. In addition to full-time professors who conduct research and have full teaching duties, there are part-time professors who have only a partial teaching load. Part-time teachers are often recruited from research organizations (CNRS, CEA, INRIA, etc.) that carry out their activities on the school's campus, in the Paris region, or sometimes even in the provinces.

== Academic programs ==
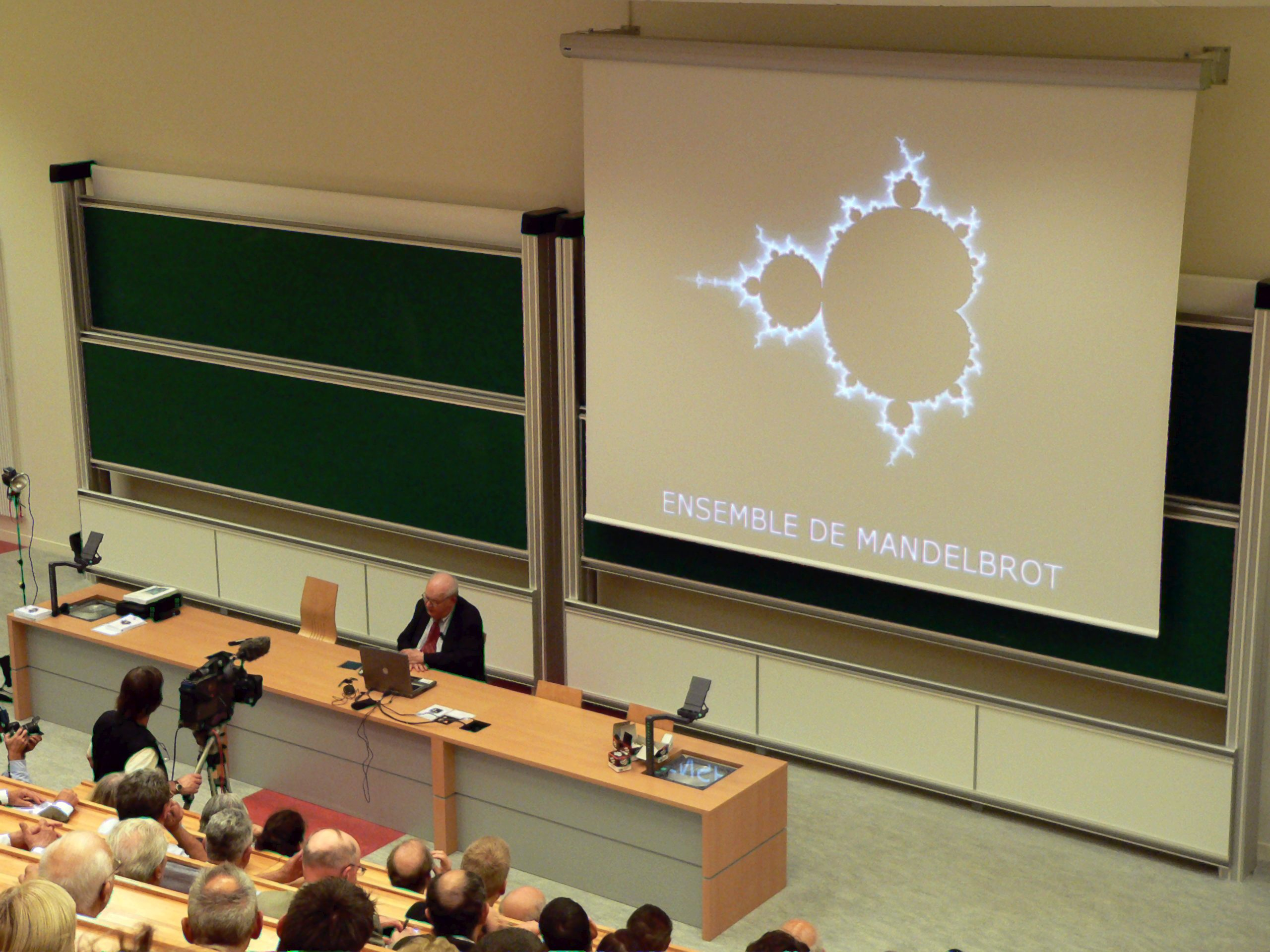
Benoît Mandelbrot during his speech at the ceremony when he was made an officer of the Legion of Honour on 11 September 2006, at the École polytechnique

=== The Ingénieur polytechnicien program ===
The Ingénieur polytechnicien ("Polytechnician Engineer") program awards the prestigious diplôme d'ingénieur degree, and is selective upon entry. The subjects covered often go beyond the student's specialty, and the course is focused on generalized education allowing cross-fertilization between different fields.

In addition to 2,000 Ingénieur polytechnicien students (500 students per year), the institution has approximately 439 master's students and 572 doctoral students, for a total of 2,900 enrolled.

==== Admission ====
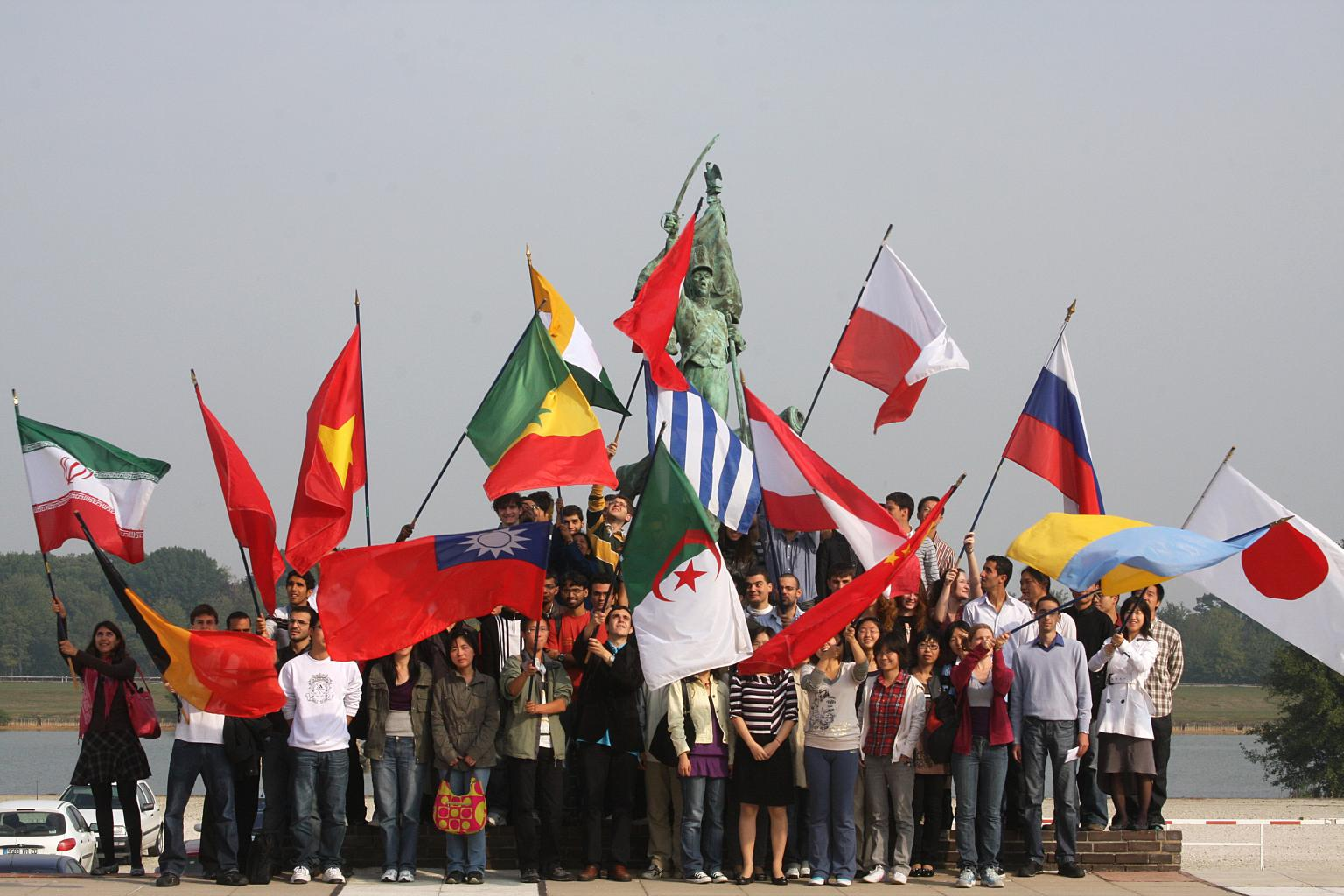
Foreign students of the École

There are two ways to enter the Ingénieur polytechnicien program. The first way is through a very selective competitive examination that requires at least two years of intensive preparation after high school in classes préparatoires. The second way is to do undergraduate studies at another university. There is a week of written exams in the spring, followed by oral exams in the summer.

About 400 French students are admitted to the school each year. Foreign students who have completed a classe préparatoire can also enter through the same competitive examination. In total, there are about 100 foreign students admitted to this cycle each year. Foreign students from European or American universities can also be admitted as part of an exchange program for a semester or a year.

==== Curriculum ====
Four years of study are required for the engineering degree: one year of military service (for French nationals only) and a scientific "common curriculum" (eight months and four months, respectively), one year of multidisciplinary studies, and one year of specialized studies ("majors"). Since the reform of the curriculum in 2000, students complete a fourth year of study in a partner institution.

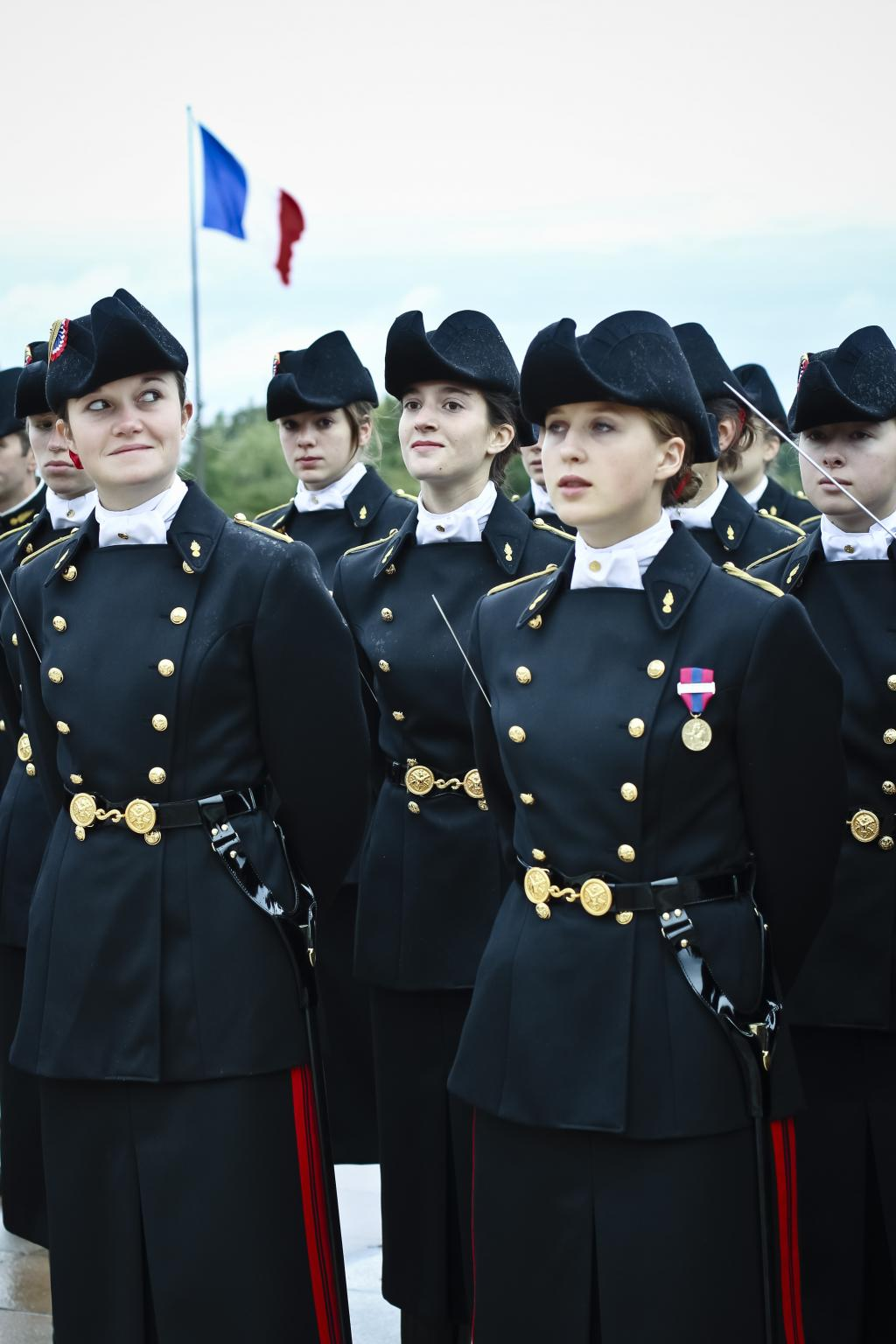
Students wearing the uniform of Polytechnique

First year

The curriculum begins with eight months of mandatory military service for students of French nationality. In the past, this service lasted 12 months and was compulsory for all French students; the abolition of draft in France made this requirement of Polytechnique somewhat anachronistic, and the service was reformulated as a period of "human and military training." All French students spend a month together at La Courtine in a military training center. By the end of this month, they are assigned either to a civilian service or to the Army, Navy, Air Force or Gendarmerie. Students who are assigned to military service undergo two months of military training at French officer schools such as Saint-Cyr or École Navale. Finally, they are assigned to a wide range of units for a five-month tour of duty in a French military unit (which may include, but is not limited to, infantry and artillery regiments, warships, and air bases).

While French students remain under military status during their studies at Polytechnique, and participate in various ceremonies and other military events, such as national ceremonies like Bastille Day or the anniversaries of the armistices of the World Wars, they do not undergo actual military training after completing their first-year service. They receive at the end of the first year the full dress uniform, which comprises black trousers with a red stripe ( formerly a skirt for females, it's use was ended in 2020), a coat with brass buttons and a belt, a small sword and a cocked hat (officially called a bicorne). French-speaking foreign students perform civil service. Civil service can, for example, consist of being an assistant in a high school in a disadvantaged French suburb.

Then begins a four-month period during which all students take the same five courses: Mathematics, Applied Mathematics, Physics, Computer Science and Economics.

Second year

The second year is a year of multidisciplinary studies. The set of disciplines covers most of the scientific fields (mathematics, applied mathematics, mechanics, computer science, biology, physics, chemistry, economics) and some areas of the humanities (foreign languages, general humanities...). Students must choose twelve courses in at least five different disciplines.

Third year

In the third year, students must choose a specialization (programme d'approfondissement), which often focuses on a discipline or sometimes an interdisciplinary subject. This year ends with a research internship (four to six months). Students also earn a Master's degree in engineering, science and technology in their third year.

Fourth year

The fourth year is the beginning of more specialized studies: students who do not enter a State Corps must enter either a Master's degree or a doctorate, a partner college or institute such as the École des mines de Paris or ENSAE, or a specialization institute such as Institut Supérieur de l'Aéronautique et de l'Espace (SUPAERO) in Toulouse or ENSPM in Rueil-Malmaison. The reason for this is that the generic education provided at Polytechnique is more focused on developing thinking skills than on preparing students for the transition to a real engineering career, which requires more advanced technical training.

==== Class rank and career path ====
The grades of the second year of the curriculum are used to rank the students. Traditionally, this individual exit ranking was very important for the French students of the École polytechnique, and certain peculiarities in the organization of studies and ranking can be attributed to the need for equity among students.

For French nationals, this ranking is part of a government recruitment program: a certain number of places in civil or military corps, including elite civil servant such as the Corps des Mines or Corps of Bridges, Waters and Forests, are open to students each year. These specific corps of civil servants, which provide the senior executives of the public administration, are open only to students of the École polytechnique and to rare students of the Ecole Normale Supérieure. At some point in their studies, students make a list of the corps they wish to enter in order of preference, and they are enrolled in the highest corps according to their ranking. The next step for French Polytechnicians is to join one of the four technical schools of the civil service: École des mines, École des ponts et chaussées, Institut Supérieur de l'Aéronautique et de l'Espace (SUPAERO), Télécom Paris, ENSTA Paris or ENSAE, thus joining one of the civil service bodies known as grands corps techniques de l'État. Those who follow this path are called as X-Mines, X-Ponts, X-SUPAERO, X-Télécoms and X-INSEE respectively.

Since the X2000 reform, the importance of rank has diminished. With the exception of the corps curriculum, the universities and schools where Polytechnicians complete their training now base their acceptance decisions on the transcripts of all grades.

Of the 47% of graduates who decide to pursue a professional career in the private sector, the majority (58%) are based in the Greater Paris area, 8% in the rest of France, while 34% are based outside France. Only 12% of the cohort work under a non-French employment contract. École polytechnique students earn an average of €44,000 per year after graduation.

==== Tuition and financial obligations ====
French students admitted to the École polytechnique do not pay tuition fees and receive a salary as officer cadets. Through the student board, they redistribute part of this sum to foreign students.

There is no particular financial obligation for students who complete the program and then enter an application school or graduate program accredited by the École polytechnique.

=== Bachelor program ===
The Bachelor is a three-year program fully taught in English which opened in 2017. Either French nationals or international students are eligible. Applications are opened to final year high school students. Selection is made through an online application file and an oral interview. During the first year of the programme, students follow a pluridisciplinary curriculum based on mathematics.

=== Master's program ===
École polytechnique offers various master's programs, alone or in association with other schools and universities, on a wide variety of subjects that are more specialized than the Ingénieur polytechnicien program. The school offers programs in AI, computer vision, economics, finance, environmental science, energy, and data science. Some degrees in entrepreneurship are delivered in partnership with HEC Paris.

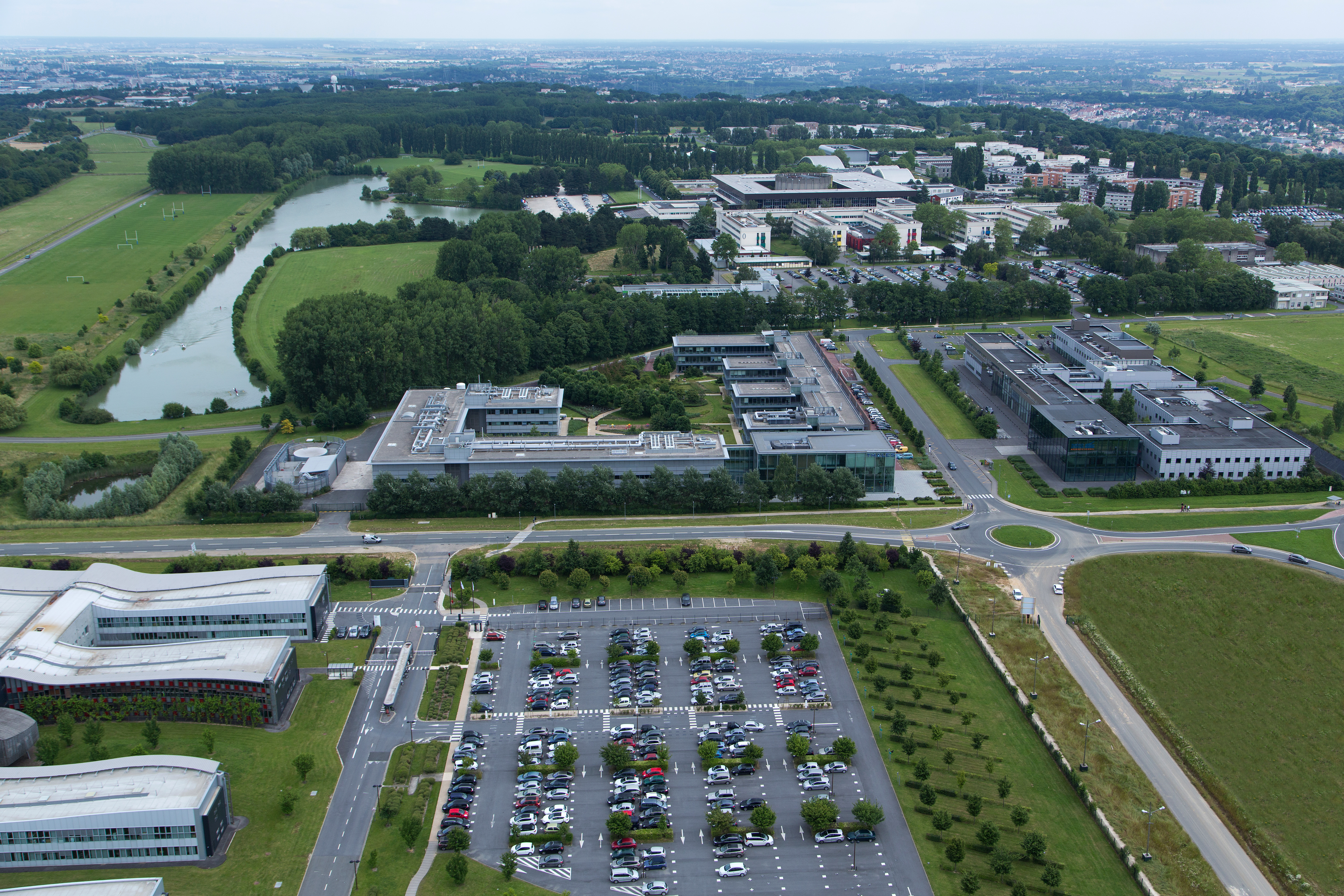
Aerial view of the École polytechnique campus

=== Doctoral program ===
The school also has a doctoral program open to students with a master's degree or equivalent. Doctoral students generally work in the school's laboratories; they may also work in external institutes or institutions that cannot or will not award a doctorate.

About 40% of doctoral students come from abroad.

=== Research centres ===
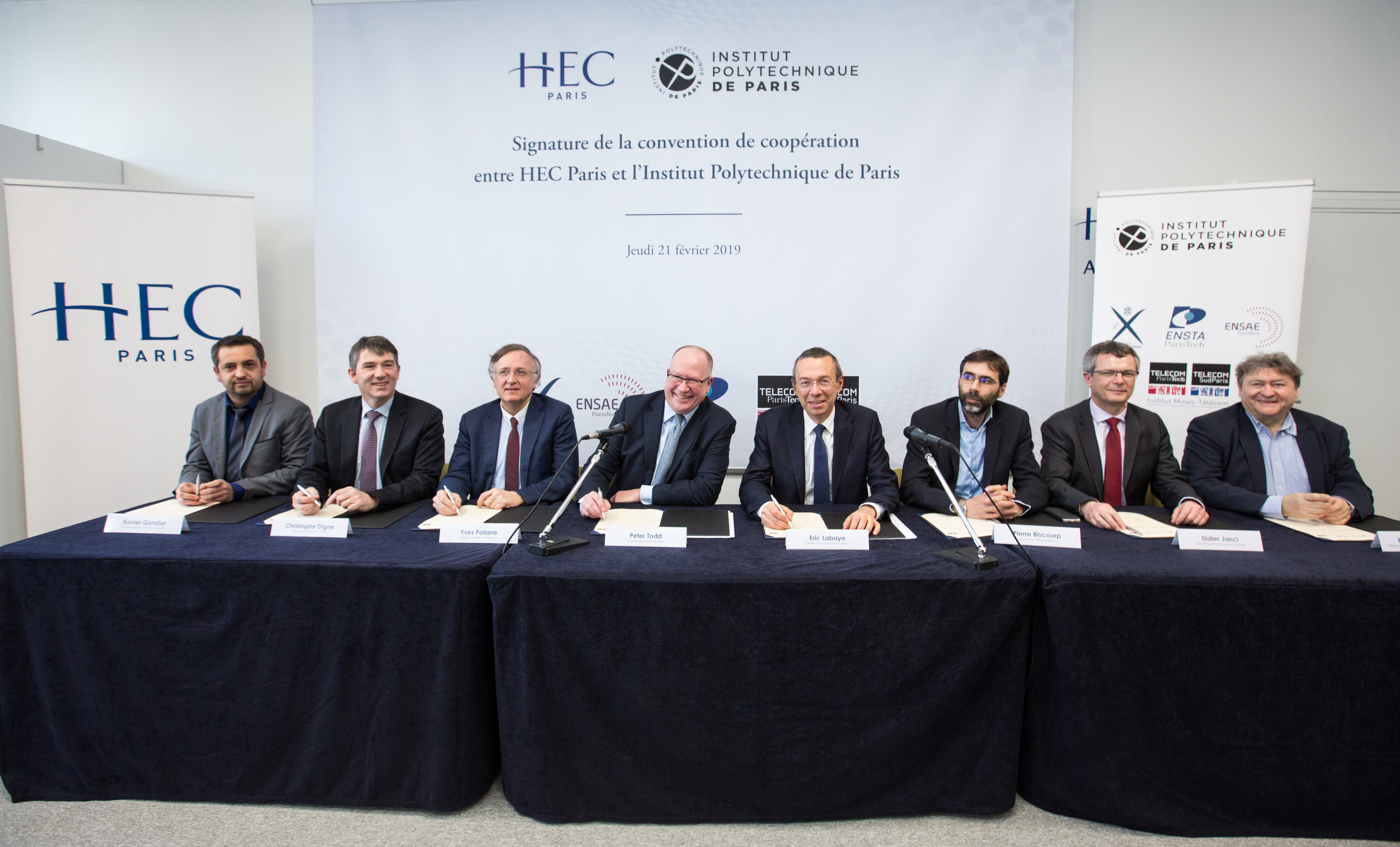
The Cooperation Agreement between HEC Paris and the Institut Polytechnique de Paris (IP Paris) signed on February 21, 2019.

École polytechnique has many research laboratories operating in various scientific fields (physics, mathematics, computer science, economics, chemistry, biology, etc.), most operated in association with national scientific institutions such as CNRS, CEA, Inserm, and Inria.

== Student life ==
Students are represented by a board of 20 students known as "la Kès", elected each November. La Kès manages the relationships with teachers, management, alumni and partners. It publishes a weekly students paper, InfoKès.

== Sports ==
Sports are an important part of student life, as all students are required to play 6 hours of sports per week. There are competitive and club sports ranging from skydiving and judo to circus and hiking. There are two swimming pools, dojo and fencing rooms, and an equestrian center on campus. The "Jumping de l'X" is an international show jumping competition organized by the school.

== Notable people ==
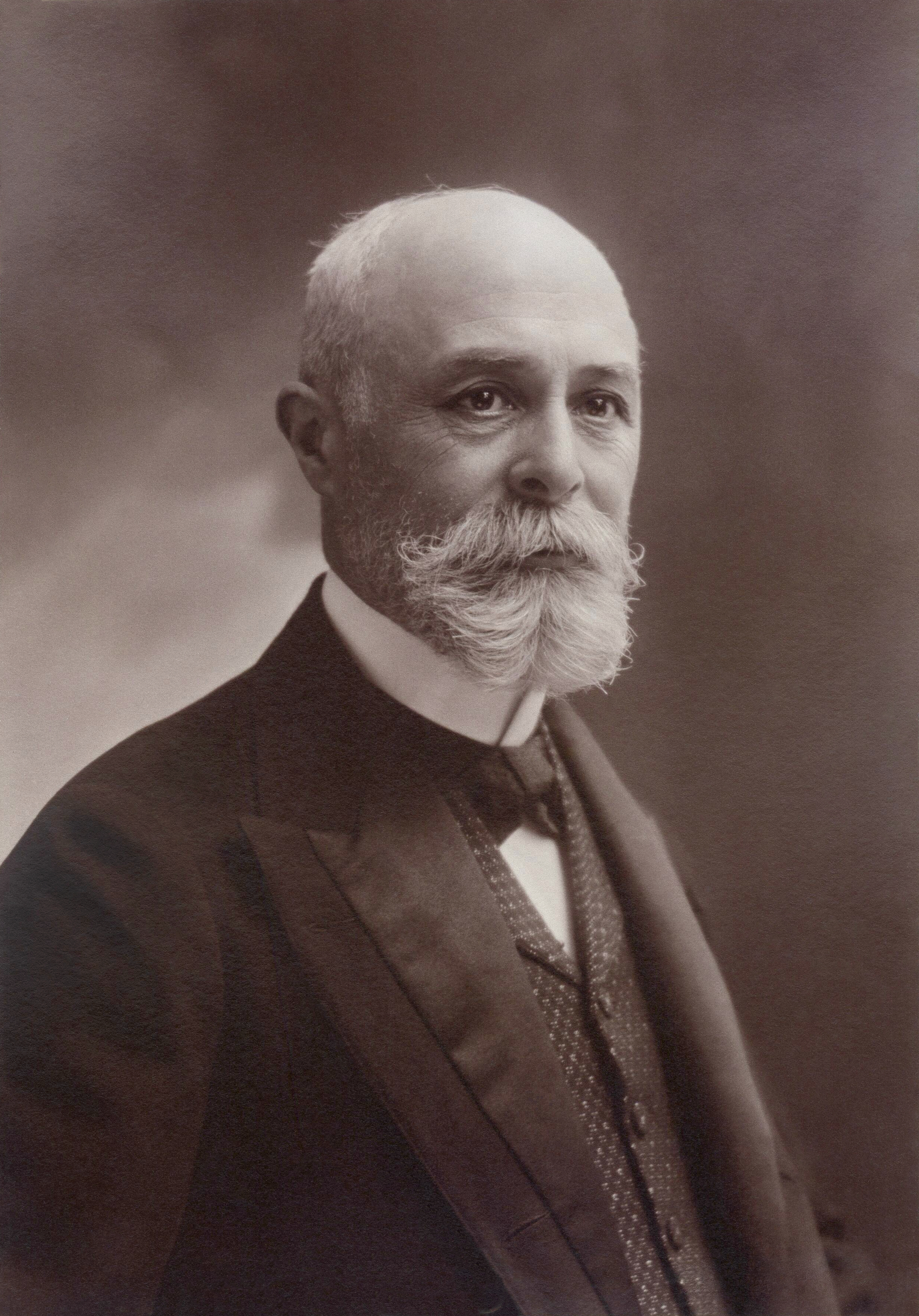
Henri Becquerel (X1872), Nobel Prize in Physics 1903

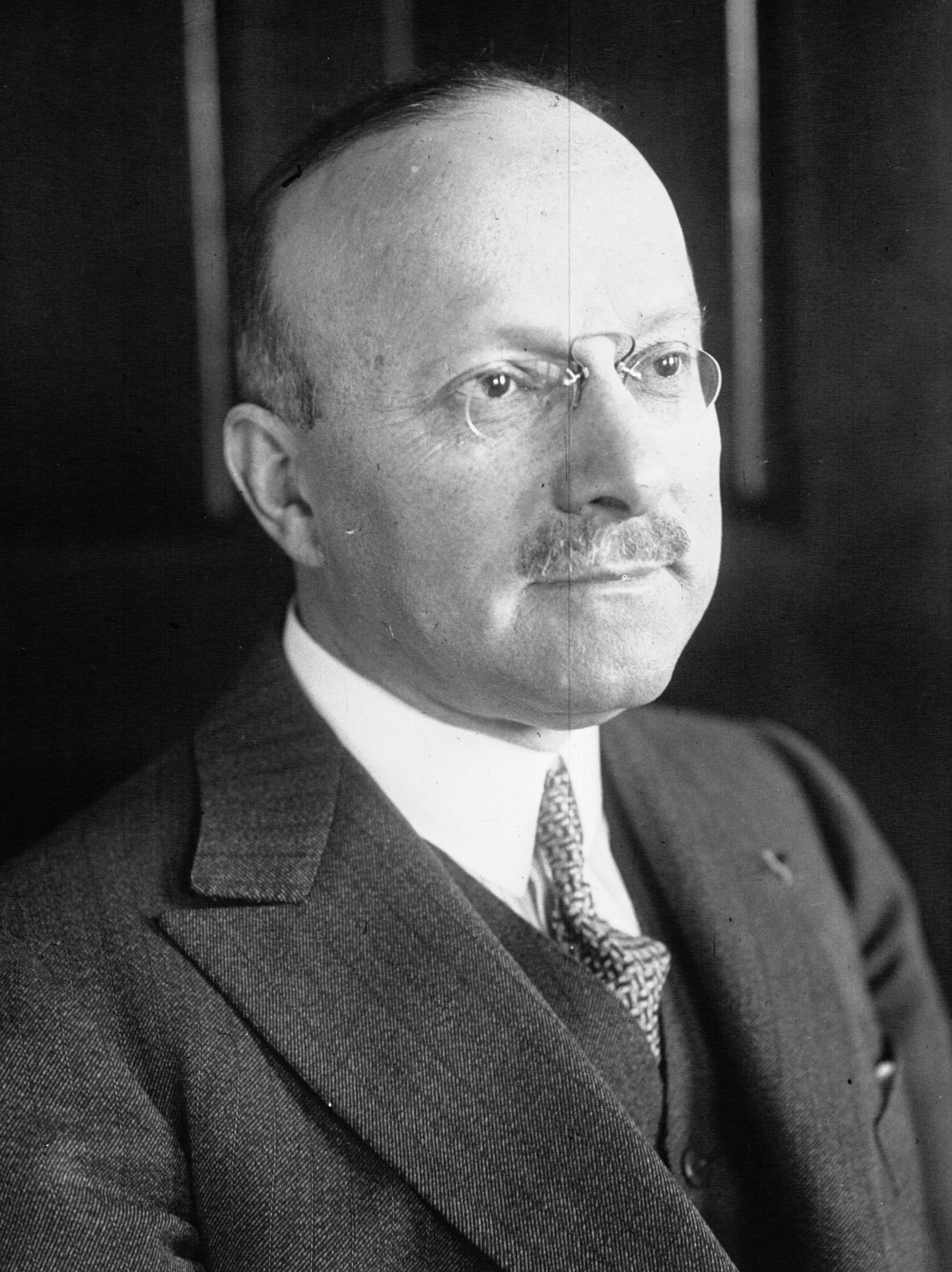
André Citroën (X1898), founder of Citroën

Many École polytechnique graduates hold important positions in government, industry and research in France. Its alumni include three Nobel prizes winners, three presidents of the French Republic, and several business and industry leaders. Researchers at the French National Centre for Scientific Research have found that most business executives in France are traditionally alumni of École polytechnique.

== Rankings ==
=== General rankings ===
In international rankings, École polytechnique is ranked as part of the Polytechnic Institute of Paris.

=== Research performance ===
In 2020, the Performance Ranking of Scientific Papers for World Universities ranked the university at 475th globally with its "Engineering Subjects" placed at 451–500th in the world. In 2020, it is ranked 509th in the world by the University Ranking by Academic Performance.

=== Other rankings ===
In the 2015 Times Higher Education Small Universities Rankings, École polytechnique ranks third, after Caltech and École normale supérieure (Paris).

Year	QS Rank (Change)
2014	41
2015	35 (▲6)
2016	40 (▼5)
2017	53 (▼13)
2018	59 (▼6)
2019	65 (▼6)
2020	60 (▲5)
2021	61 (▼1)

The Mines ParisTech : Professional Ranking World Universities, which looks at the education of the Fortune 500 CEOs, ranks École polytechnique seventh in the world in its 2011 ranking (1st being Harvard University), second among French institutions behind HEC Paris.

Year	Rank (Change)
2007	4 ( 0)
2008	15 (▼11)
2009	14 (▲1)
2010	12 (▲2)
2011	7 (▲5)

== Criticisms ==
The French grandes écoles, including the École polytechnique, are criticized for their "elitism" and lack of diversity. INSEE has found that the children of executives and teachers are more likely to enter the écoles than children from lower-income families. A more recent report found that children of employers are 50 times more likely to enter the Ecole polytechnique than the children of workers.

== Gallery ==
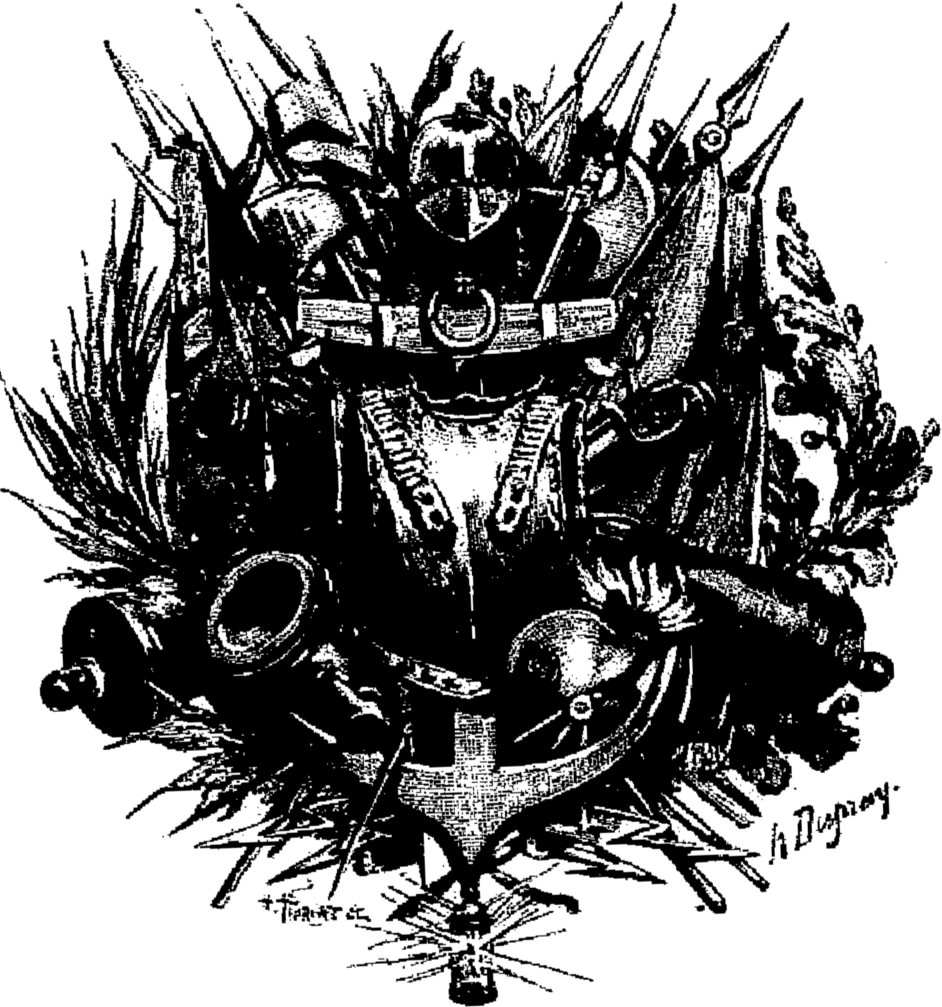
The arms of the École polytechnique

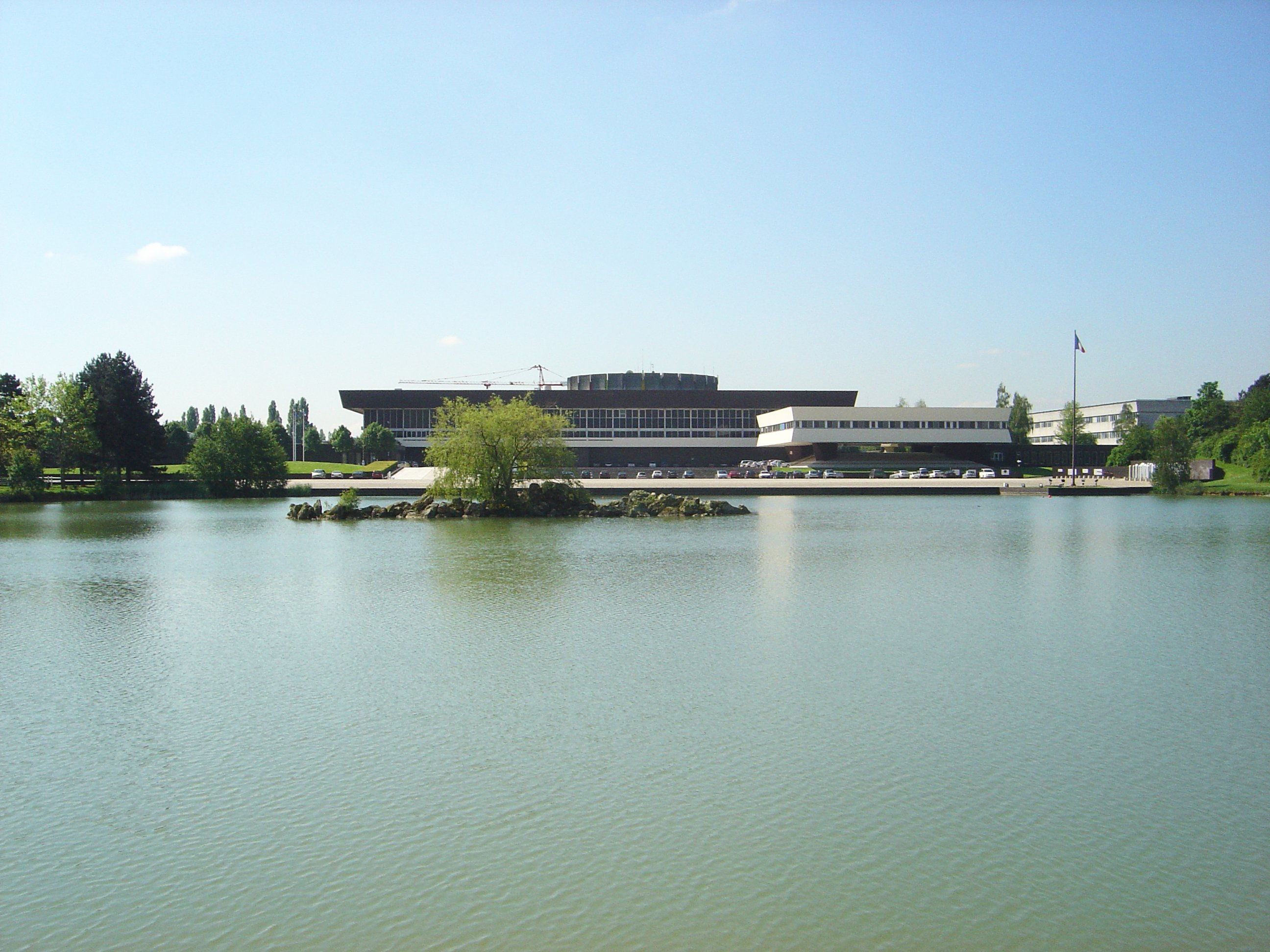
The main hall seen from the lake

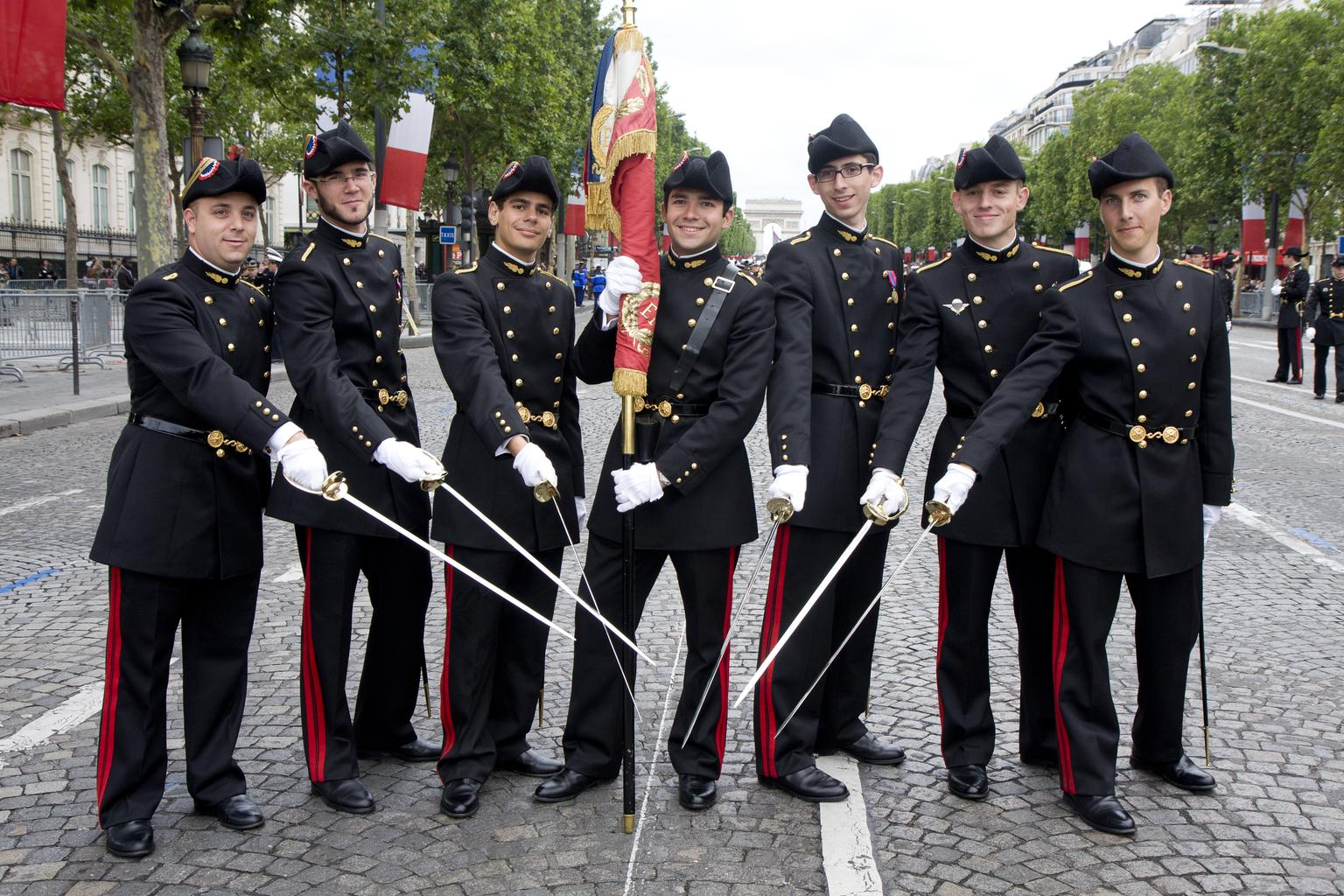
Polytechnique cadets at the Bastille Day Military Parade

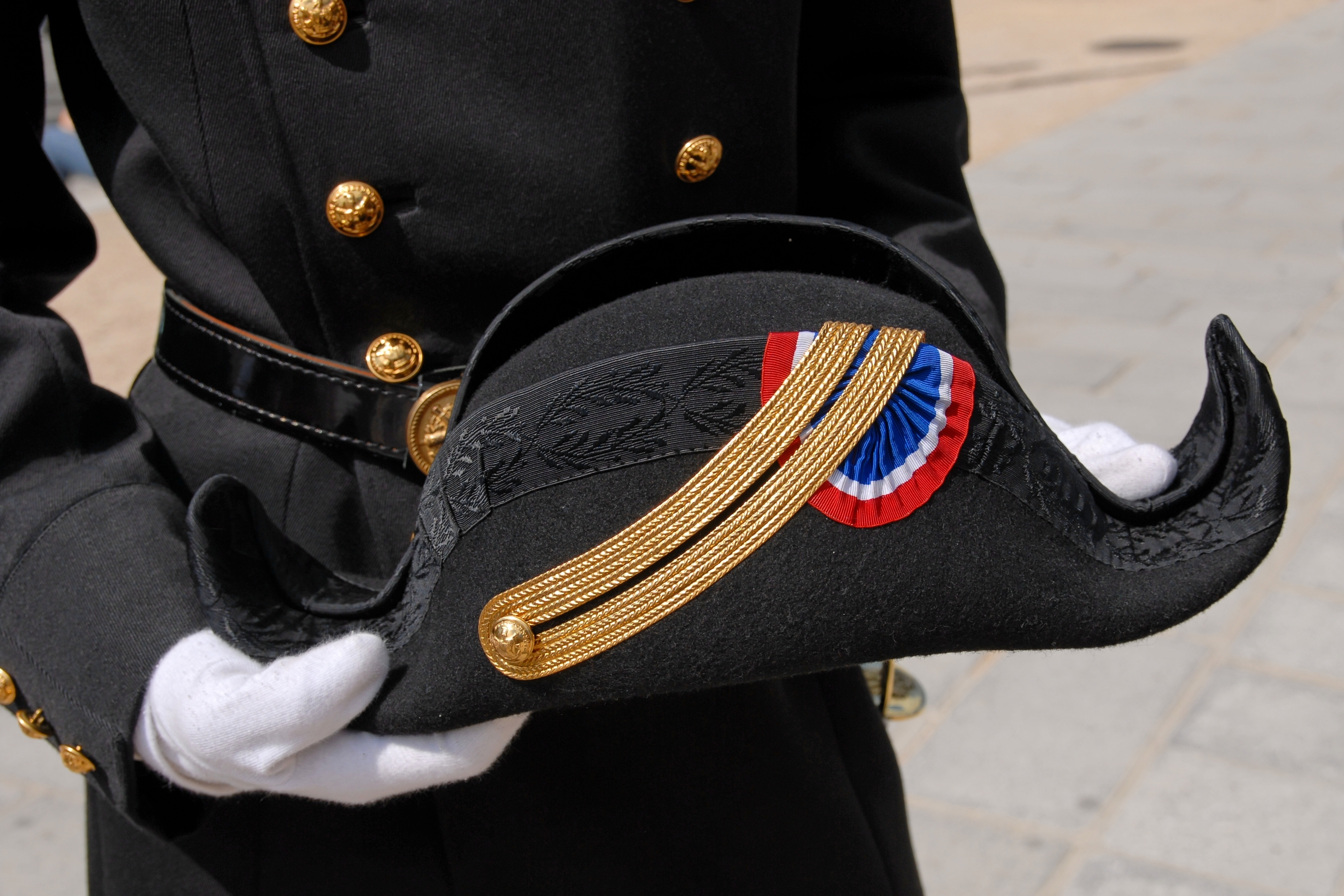
The Polytechnique bicorne hat

== See also ==
- Traditions of the École Polytechnique
- Grandes écoles
- Higher education in France
- Centre de mathématiques Laurent-Schwartz
- LULI

== Bibliography ==
- Clark, Burton R. (1993). The Research Foundations of Graduate Education: Germany, Britain, France, United States, Japan. University of California Press. p. 412. ISBN 978-0-520-07997-7.
- Gillispie, Charles C. (2004). Science and Polity in France, the Revolutionary and Napoleonic Years. Princeton Universitv Press. ISBN 978-0-691-11541-2.
- Jean-Pierre Callot; Michel Camus; Bernard Esambert; Jacques Bouttes (23 June 2004). Histoire et Prospective de l'École polytechnique [History and Prospects of the École Polytechnique] (21 cm × 23 cm, hardcover with dust jacket, ill.) (2nd ed.). Paris: Lavauzelle. ISBN 978-2-702-50350-8. OCLC 464063564. BnF 35607251.
- "In France, the Heads No Longer Roll", The New York Times, Sunday, 17 February 2008
