= Villebon-sur-Yvette =

Commune in Île-de-France, France

- Commune
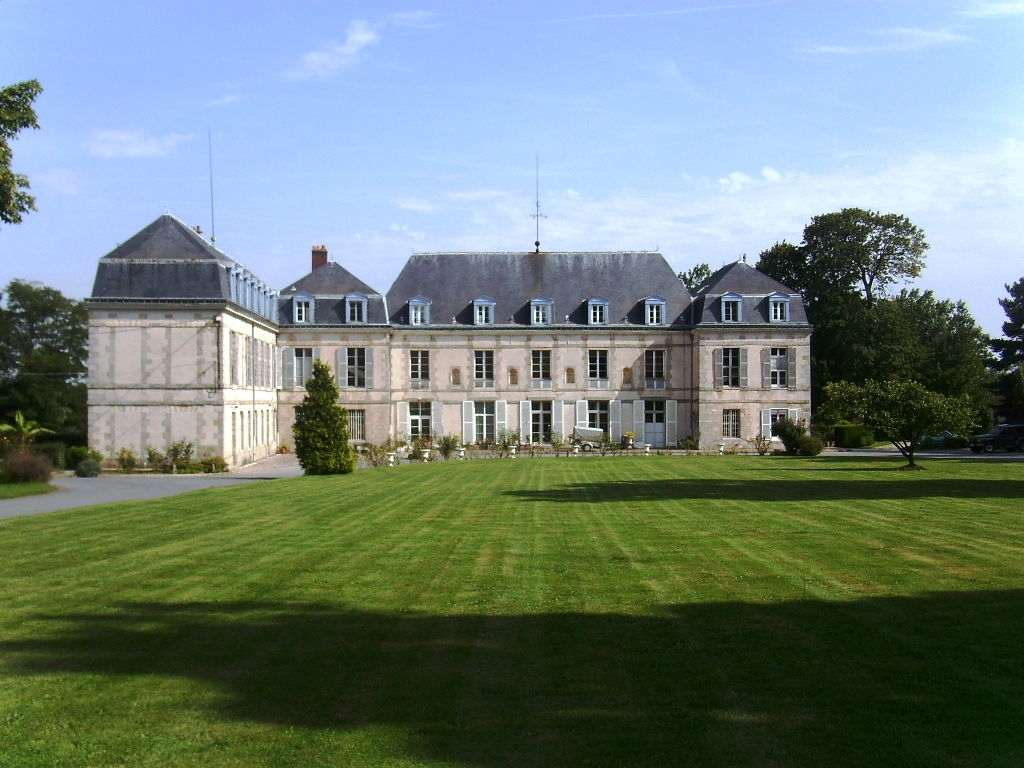
- Chateau of Villebon

- Coat of arms
- Location of Villebon-sur-Yvette
- Location within France Location within Île-de-France (region)
- Coordinates: 48°42′01″N 2°13′40″E
- Country: France
- Region: Île-de-France
- Department: Essonne
- Arrondissement: Palaiseau
- Canton: Les Ulis
- Intercommunality: CA Paris-Saclay

Government
  - Mayor (2021–2026): Victor Da Silva
- Area^{1}: 7.41 km^{2} (2.86 sq mi)
- Highest elevation: 164 m (538 ft)
- Lowest elevation: 43 m (141 ft)
- Population (2023): 10,291
  - Density: 1,390/km^{2} (3,600/sq mi)
- Time zone: UTC+01:00 (CET)
  - Summer (DST): UTC+02:00 (CEST)
- INSEE/Postal code: 91661 /91140
- ^{1} French Land Register data, which excludes lakes, ponds, glaciers > 1 km^{2} (0.386 sq mi or 247 acres) and river estuaries.

Villebon-sur-Yvette (French pronunciation: [vilbɔ̃ syʁ ivɛt], literally Villebon on Yvette) is a commune in the Essonne department in Île-de-France in northern France, about 20 kilometres (12 mi) south of Paris.

Thanks to the presence of the business centers of Courtabœuf and Grand Dôme as well as the commercial center of Villebon 2, it has become one of the richest communes in the department. It notably hosts France's first Costco store.

== Geography ==
Villebon-sur-Yvette is located in the Hurepoix area on the river Yvette, in the valley of the same name (also called Vallée de Chevreuse) on ground that is composed of milled stone, sand and clay. It covers an area of 743 ha between the Courtabœuf industrial park and the river, divided into sections of 426 ha of residential construction, 165 ha of forest and 152 ha of agricultural land, protected by the air lane of Orly Airport.

Villebon-sur-Yvette is located approximately 7 km (4.3 mi) from Massy and Gif-sur-Yvette, 8 km (5.0 mi) from Longjumeau, 13 km (8.1 mi) from Montlhéry and 22 km (14 mi) to the south-west of Notre Dame de Paris.

Adjacent communes are Palaiseau, Champlan, Saulx-les-Chartreux, Villejust, Les Ulis and Orsay.

=== Transportation ===
- By the RER B, Saint-Rémy-lès-Chevreuse direction, stations Palaiseau-Villebon and Lozère.
- By the Noctilien N122, station "Les Suisses-Lozère" between 0h30am and 5h30am.
- By the A6 Autoroute, exit 3 "Massy, Palaiseau, Villebon-sur-Yvette".
- By the RN 118, exit "Orsay Centre".

=== Communication ===
At Villebon-sur-Yvette, there is an AM broadcasting station working on 864 kHz. It is one of the few stations in Europe using AM Stereo.

== History ==
Until 1056, the history of Villebon-sur-Yvette is related to that of Palaiseau. On this date, Fromand de Paris became the first lord of Villebon. Under the reign of his son, Aszo, the name Villabona was adopted in 1092. He built a farm on the current site of the castle. In 1196, Gautier of Villebon became Grand Chamberman of France. He was followed by Peter of Nemours, Bishop of Paris from 1208 to 1219. Lambert of Villebon left to follow the Eighth Crusade to Tunisia in 1270 with King Louis IX.

In 1474, the area of Villebon became the property of the De Thou family. In 1512, Augustin of Thou had built in place of the existing residence a small Renaissance-style castle, today known as Henri IV House. In 1563 Nicolas de Thou, lord of Villebon and bishop of Chartres, obtained permission from King Charles IX to establish a weekly market, held every Thursday, and two fairs, on 27 September and 12 November, for which Villebon gained a certain amount of recognition. In 1587, it made build a vault with Villebon under the invocation of Saints Cosmas and Damian.

In 1793, the Court of Appeal of Paris decided to separate Yvette from the two communities of Villebon and Palaiseau.

The introduction of a rail-link to Paris at the beginning of the 20th century allowed Villebon, like its neighbors, to develop its industry and reputation as a tourist destination for Parisians.

On 23 June 1920, the real estate company the School of Île-de-France, represented by Mr. Hawkins, a former pupil of the University of Cambridge acquired the castle, its dependences and the surrounding 100 hectares of forest and meadows for one million francs.

In 1922, in order to avoid confusion with the commune of Villebon in the département of Eure-et-Loir, the commune adopted the name of Villebon-sur-Yvette, in reference to the nearby river.

== Population ==
The inhabitants of Villebon-sur-Yvette are known as Villebonnais in French.

Historical population
Year	Pop.	±% p.a.
1968	4,949	—
1975	7,234	+5.57%
1982	7,728	+0.95%
1990	9,080	+2.04%
1999	9,373	+0.35%
2007	9,637	+0.35%
2012	9,859	+0.46%
2017	10,489	+1.25%
2023	10,291	−0.32%
Source: INSEE

== Twin towns – sister cities ==
Villebon-sur-Yvette is twinned with:

- Liederbach am Taunus, Germany
- Las Rozas de Madrid, Spain
- Saldus, Latvia
- Whitnash, England, United Kingdom
