= Louveau =

Louveau is a surname. Notable people with the surname include:

- Adrien Louveau (born 2000), French association football player
- Catherine Louveau (born 1950), French sociologist and academic
- Henri Louveau (1910–1991), French racing driver
