= 2014 Women's Rugby World Cup Pool C =

Pool C of the 2014 Women's Rugby World Cup is composed of France, Australia, South Africa and Wales.

== Australia vs South Africa ==
1 August 2014

Australia	26 - 3	South Africa
Tries:: Sharni Williams 2'; Ashleigh Hewson 22'; Tricia Brown 75'; Cons: Ashleigh Hewson 2'; Pens: Ashleigh Hewson 13', 15', 35'	Team Sheet	Pens: Tayla Kinsey 32'

CNR, Marcoussis Pitch 1
Referee: (United States) Leah Berard

FB	15	Ashleigh Hewson
RW	14	Madeline Putz
OC	13	Sharni Williams		(substituted off) 54'
IC	12	Cobie-Jane Morgan
LW	11	Natasha Haines
FH	10	Tui Ormsby
SH	9	Nita Maynard
N8	8	Mollie Gray
OF	7	Shannon Parry (c)
BF	6	Dalena Dennison
RL	5	Alisha Hewett
LL	4	Rebecca Clough
TP	3	Caroline Vakalahi
HK	2	Louise Burrows
LP	1	Oneata Schwalger
Replacements:
HK	16	Margaret Watson		(substituted in) 73'
PR	17	Liz Patu		(substituted in) 52'
FL	18	Michelle Milward		(substituted in) 53'
FL	19	Chloe Butler	(substituted in) 54'	(yellow card) 63'
CE	20	Ashley Marsters		(substituted in) 70'
CE	21	Hanna Sio		(substituted in) 73'
FB	22	Tricia Brown		(substituted in) 60'
Coach:
(Australia) Paul Verell

FB	15	Cindy Cant
RW	14	Veroeshka Grain		(substituted off) 38'
OC	13	Benele Makwezela
IC	12	Lorinda Brown
LW	11	Phumeza Gadu
FH	10	Zenay Jordaan
SH	9	Tayla Kinsey
N8	8	Mandisa Williams (c)
OF	7	Vuyolwethu Vazi
BF	6	Lamla Momoti
RL	5	Nolusindiso Booi
LL	4	Celeste Adonis
TP	3	Cebisa Kula
HK	2	Denita Wentzel
LP	1	Asithandile Ntoyanto
Replacements:
HK	16	Thantaswa Macingwane		(substituted in) 73'
PR	17	Nwabisa Ngxatu		(substituted in) 53'
FL	18	Andrea Mentoor		(substituted in) 64'
N8	19	Shona-Leah Weston	(substituted in) 43'	(yellow card) 46'
SH	20	Fundiswa Plaatjie		(substituted in) 44'
CE	21	Zandile Nojoko		(substituted in) 74'
FB	22	Siviwe Basweni		(substituted in) 43'
Coach:
(South Africa) Lawrence Sephaka

== France vs Wales ==
1 August 2014

France	26-0	Wales
Tries:: Marion Lievre 25', 38'; Shannon Izar 34'; Elodie Poublan 78'; Cons: Sandrine Agricole 25', 38'; Christelle Le Duff 78'	Team Sheet

CNR, Marcoussis Pitch 1
Referee: (Ireland) Helen O'Reilly

FB	15	Caroline Ladagnous
RW	14	Marion Lievre
OC	13	Shannon Izar	(substituted off) 48'
IC	12	Marjorie Mayans
LW	11	Camille Grassineau
FH	10	Sandrine Agricole	(substituted off) 60'
SH	9	Jennifer Troncy
N8	8	Safi N'Diaye
OF	7	Laëtitia Grand
BF	6	Coumba Tombe Diallo	(substituted off) 64'
RL	5	Assa Koïta
LL	4	Marine De Nadaï
TP	3	Christelle Chobet	(substituted off) 59'
HK	2	Gaëlle Mignot (c)
LP	1	Hélène Ezanno	(substituted off) 59'
Replacements:
HK	16	Lise Arricastre	(substituted in) 59'
PR	17	Elodie Portaries	(substituted in) 48'
FL	18	Manon André
FL	19	Koumiba Djossouvi	(substituted in) 64'
SH	20	Elodie Poublan	(substituted in) 59'
FH	21	Christelle Le Duff	(substituted in) 60'
WG	22	Yanna Rivoalen
Coach:
(France) Christian Galonnier

FB	15	Laurie Harries		(substituted off) 39'
RW	14	Adriana Taviner
OC	13	Elen Evans		(substituted off) 62'
IC	12	Rebecca De Filippo
LW	11	Philippa Tuttiett
FH	10	Elinor Snowsill
SH	9	Amy Day
N8	8	Sioned Harries		(substituted off) 58'
OF	7	Rachel Taylor (c)
BF	6	Catrina Nicholas		(substituted off) 42'
RL	5	Shona Powell Hughes
LL	4	Jenny Hawkins
TP	3	Megan York		(substituted off) 58'
HK	2	Lowri Harries
LP	1	Caryl Thomas		(substituted off) 63'
Replacements:
PR	16	Carys Phillips		(substituted in) 58'
HK	17	Jenny Davies	(substituted in) 63'	(yellow card) 73'
PR	18	Catrin Edwards		(substituted in) 58'
FL	19	Nia Davies		(substituted in) 42'
SH	20	Sian Moore
CE	21	Robyn Wilkins		(substituted in) 62'
FB	22	Dyddgu Hywel		(substituted in) 39'
Coach:
(Wales) Rhys Edwards

== Australia vs Wales ==
5 August 2014

Australia	25–3	Wales
Tries: Sharni Williams 13', Tricia Brown 22', 49'; Cons: Ashleigh Hewson 13', 22'; Pens: Ashleigh Hewson 3', 74'; Cards: Rebecca Smyth (yellow card) 39'	Team Sheet	Pens: Robyn Wilkins 57'; Cards: Rachel Taylor (yellow card) 37'

CNR, Marcoussis Pitch 2
Referee: (Canada) Sherry Trumbull

== France vs South Africa ==
5 August 2014

France	55–3	South Africa
Tries: Safi N'Diaye 13', 50'; Penalty Try 23'; Élodie Poublan 28', 72'; Assa Koita 33', Christelle Le Duff 36', 59'; Camille Grassineau 80'+1'; Cons: Christelle Le Duff 23', 33', 36', Sandrine Agricole 72', 80'+1'	Team Sheet	Pens: Zenay Jordaan 40'+2'; Cards: Celeste Adonis (yellow card) 31'

CNR, Marcoussis Pitch 1
Referee: (Australia) Amy Perrett

== Wales vs South Africa ==
9 August 2014

Wales	35–3	South Africa
Sioned Harries 36',72', 80'+1'; Jenny Davies 56'; Cons:Robyn Wilkins 36', 56', 72'; Pens: Robyn Wilkins 3', 23'; Drop: Elinor Snowsill 28'	Team Sheet	Zenay Jordaan 7'

CNR, Marcoussis Pitch 2
Referee: (New Zealand) Jessica Beard

== Australia vs France ==
9 August 2014

Australia	3–17	France
Pens: Ashleigh Hewson 13'; Cards: Shannon Parry (yellow card) 29'	Team Sheet	Tries: Penalty Try 35', Gaelle Mignot 49'; Cons: Sandrine Agricole 35', 49'; Pens: Sandrine Agricole 5'

CNR, Marcoussis Pitch 1
Referee: (United States) Leah Berard
