= Nozay, Essonne =

Commune in Île-de-France, France

Nozay
- Commune
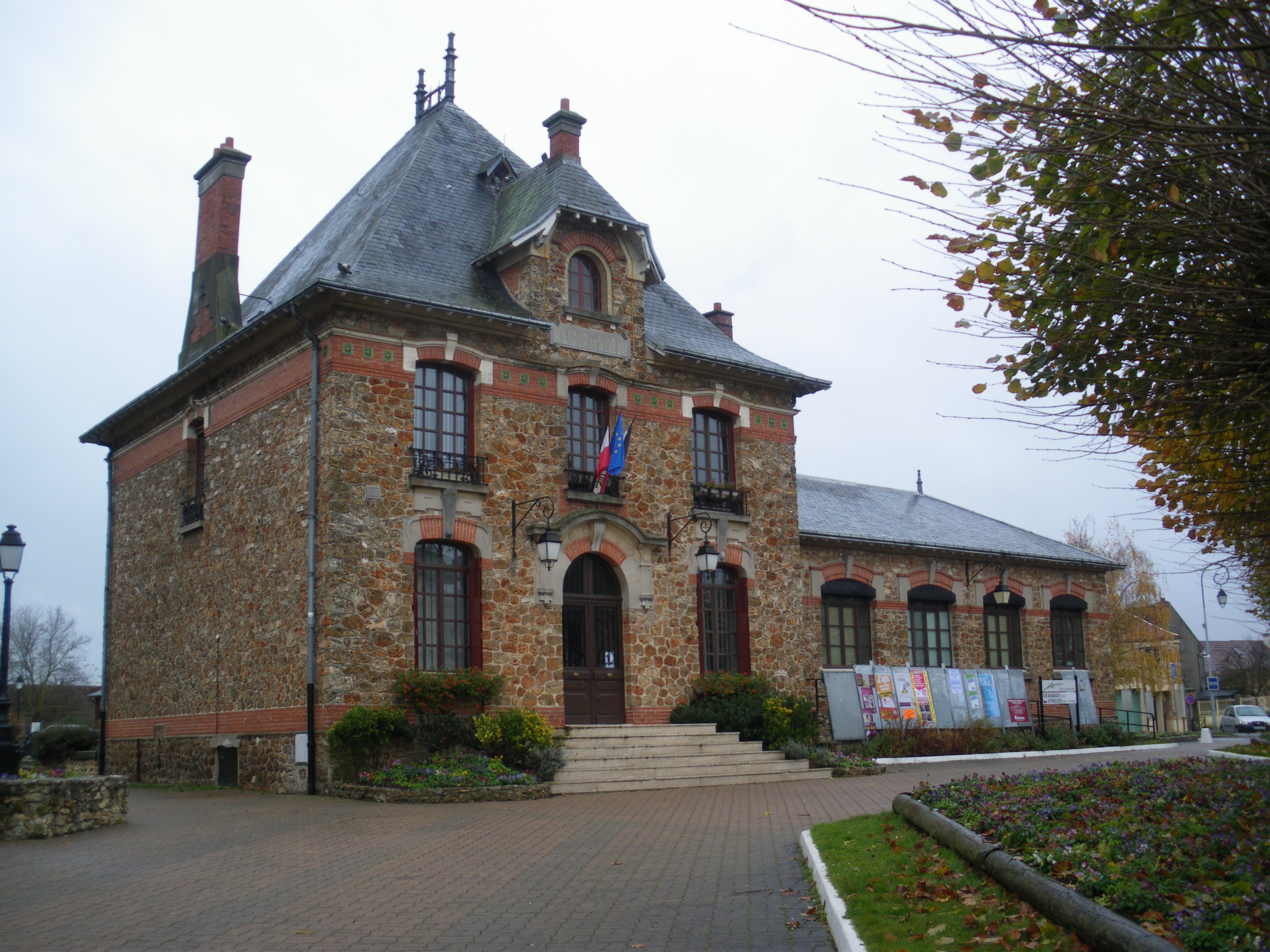
- Town hall

- Coat of arms
- Location of Nozay
- Location within France Location within Île-de-France (region)
- Coordinates: 48°39′36″N 2°14′33″E
- Country: France
- Region: Île-de-France
- Department: Essonne
- Arrondissement: Palaiseau
- Canton: Les Ulis
- Intercommunality: CA Paris-Saclay

Government
  - Mayor (2020–2026): Didier Perrier
- Area^{1}: 7.34 km^{2} (2.83 sq mi)
- Highest elevation: 168 m (551 ft)
- Lowest elevation: 95 m (312 ft)
- Population (2023): 4,471
  - Density: 609/km^{2} (1,580/sq mi)
- Time zone: UTC+01:00 (CET)
  - Summer (DST): UTC+02:00 (CEST)
- INSEE/Postal code: 91458 /91620
- ^{1} French Land Register data, which excludes lakes, ponds, glaciers > 1 km^{2} (0.386 sq mi or 247 acres) and river estuaries.

Nozay (French pronunciation: [nozɛ]) is a commune in the Essonne department in Île-de-France in northern France. It is located 26 km (16 mi) southwest of Paris.

== History ==
As the commune of La Ville-du-Bois, Nozay was a part of the commune of Marcoussis in the Middle Ages.

== Population ==
Historical population
Year	Pop.	±% p.a.
1968	668	—
1975	1,820	+15.39%
1982	2,653	+5.53%
1990	2,636	−0.08%
1999	4,275	+5.52%
2007	4,723	+1.25%
2012	4,757	+0.14%
2017	4,642	−0.49%
2023	4,471	−0.62%
Source: INSEE

Inhabitants of Nozay are known as Nozéens in French.

== Places to see ==
- Church Saint-Germain, built during the 12th Century
- La Pierre des Templiers, built during the 13th Century

== See also ==
- Communes of the Essonne department
