= Les Ulis =

Commune in Île-de-France, France

- Commune
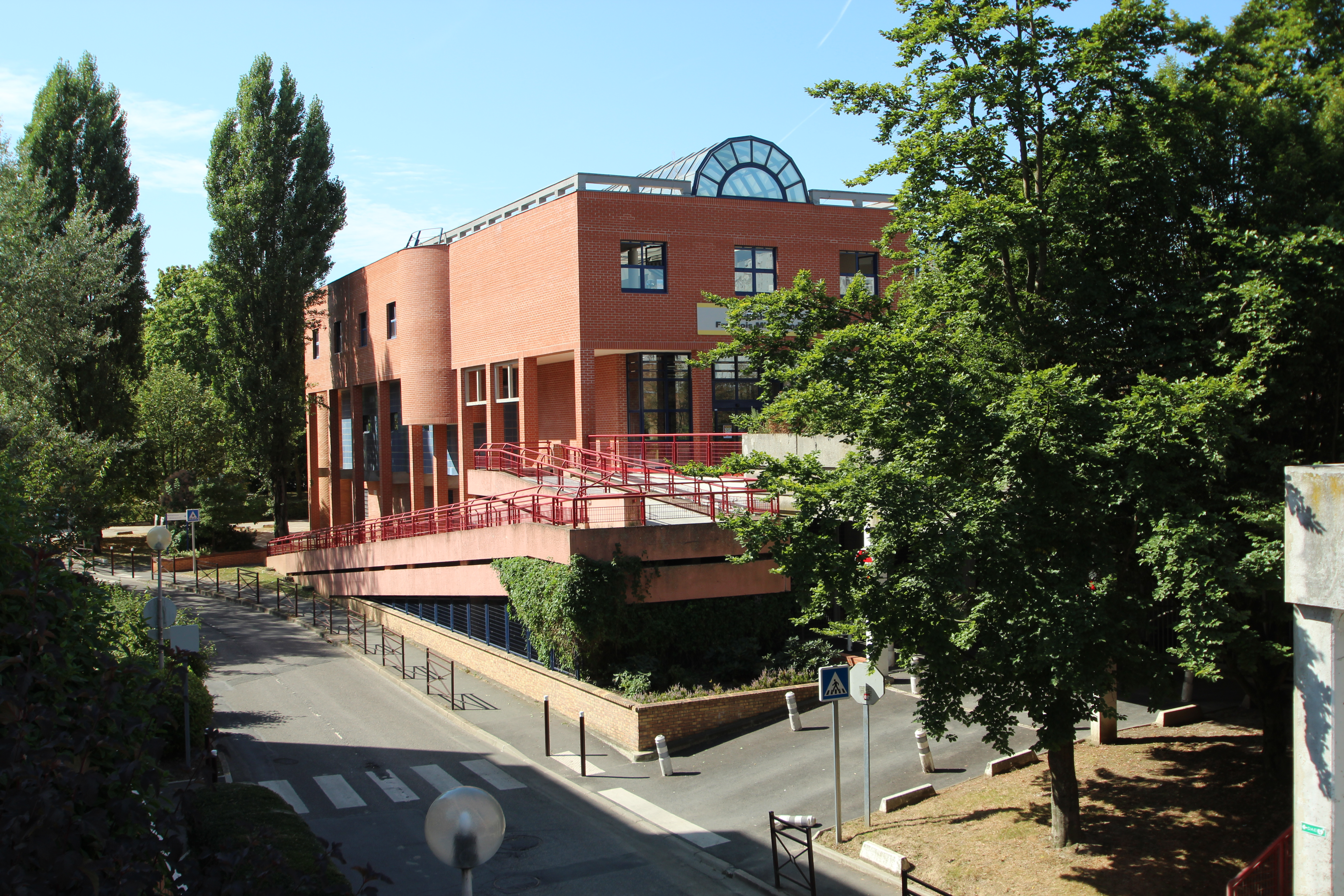
- Médiathèque François Mitterrand

- Coat of arms

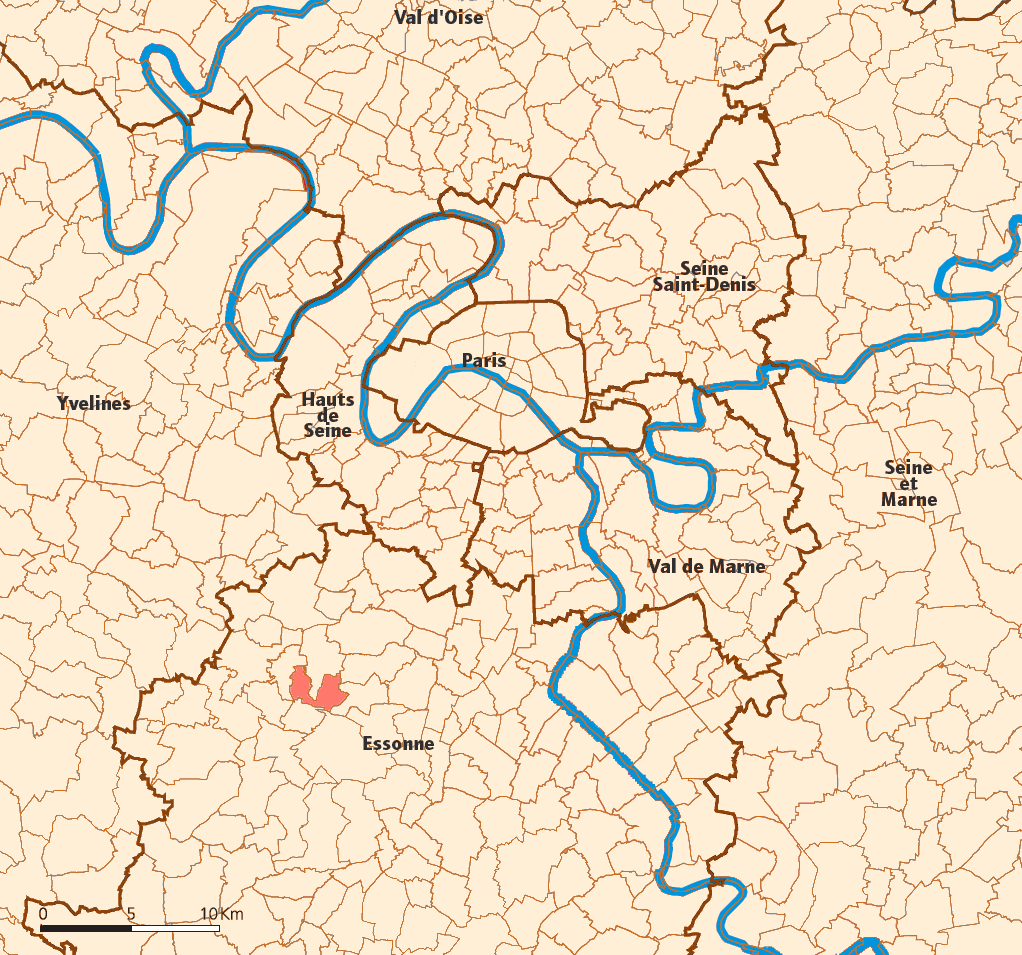
- Location (in red) within Paris inner and outer suburbs
- Location of Les Ulis
- Location within France Location within Île-de-France (region)
- Coordinates: 48°40′56″N 2°10′11″E
- Country: France
- Region: Île-de-France
- Department: Essonne
- Arrondissement: Palaiseau
- Canton: Les Ulis
- Intercommunality: CA Paris-Saclay

Government
  - Mayor (2020–2026): Clovis Cassan
- Area^{1}: 5.18 km^{2} (2.00 sq mi)
- Elevation: 155 m (509 ft)
- Highest elevation: 170 m (560 ft)
- Lowest elevation: 87 m (285 ft)
- Population (2023): 25,886
  - Density: 5,000/km^{2} (12,900/sq mi)
- Demonym: Ulissiens
- Time zone: UTC+01:00 (CET)
  - Summer (DST): UTC+02:00 (CEST)
- INSEE/Postal code: 91692 /91940
- ^{1} French Land Register data, which excludes lakes, ponds, glaciers > 1 km^{2} (0.386 sq mi or 247 acres) and river estuaries.

Les Ulis (French pronunciation: [lez‿ylis]) is a commune in the Essonne department, 23 km (14 mi) from the centre of Paris, France. A planned community, it comprises outer suburbs (banlieues) built in the 1970s on the southwestern edge of the Paris metropolitan area. As of 2023, the population of the commune was 25,886.

== Location ==
Les Ulis is a new town located in the Île-de-France, in the south-west of the Parisian agglomeration, and in the north-west of the Essonne department. It sits on the Courtabœuf plateau which dominates the Yvette valley, also known as the Chevreuse valley. It is 23 km to the south-west of central Paris, 20 km north-west of Évry, and 14 km to the south-east of Versailles.

== Geography ==
The town is laid out in the form of a U, approximately three kilometres by two kilometres, and covers 680 hectares. Over 65% of the area is built-up, 17% is semi-rural, and 16% is either rural or comprises communal green space. The French Institut Géographique National gives the co-ordinates of the town as 48°40'56" N and 02°10'03" E at the central point.

The source of the minor river Rouillon (river) is in the neighbouring town of Villejust, close to the communal border. The lowest point of the town, at the point where it meets Bures-sur-Yvette, is at an altitude of 87m. Most of the town is situated at an average altitude of over 150m. Its highest point is at 170m. The land on which it is built consists of clay, sand, and millstone.

The town is divided into distinct neighbourhoods by the main roads running through it. To the east is a large industrial zone. To the west is the residential area, a large part of which consists of 33 HLM tower blocks, grouped into four neighbourhoods.

The town was conceived and built in the 1970s according to the precepts of Le Corbusier by architects Robert Camelot, François Prieur and Georges-Henri Pingusson. Its tower blocks are raised on slabs so that they are accessed above street level by means of pedestrian walkways. The town incorporates a large urban park, to the north.

== Transport ==
Line B of the RER runs through the Chevreuse and local bus services give access to the train stations at Orsay and Bures-sur-Yvette.

Les Ulis finds itself at a significant meeting point of motorways. The most significant of these, the route nationale 118, meets the route nationale 104 at an interchange on the communal border with the town of Marcoussis.

== History ==
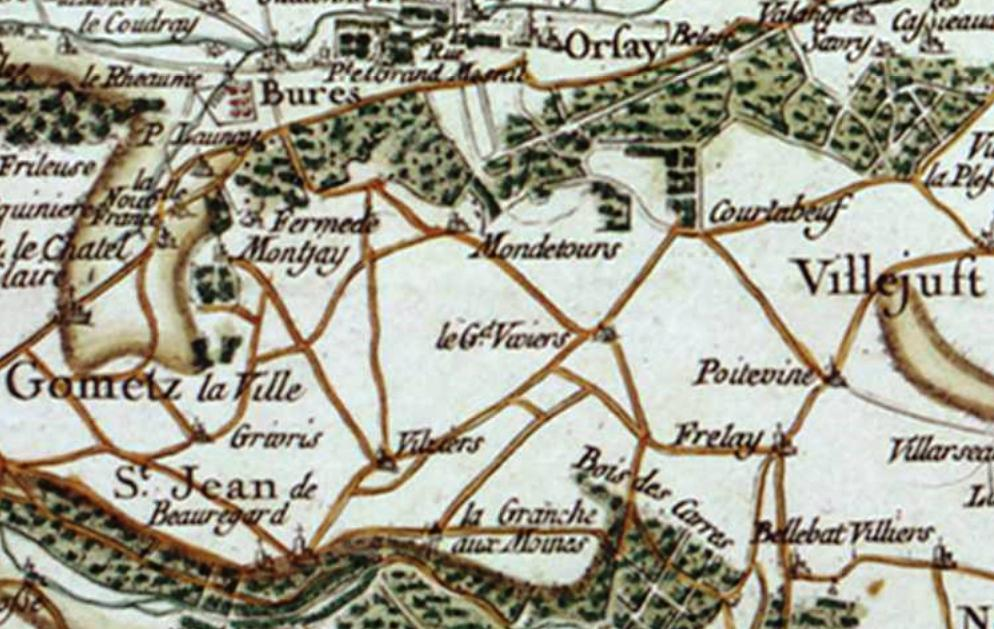
17th century map of the area now occupied by Les Ulis.

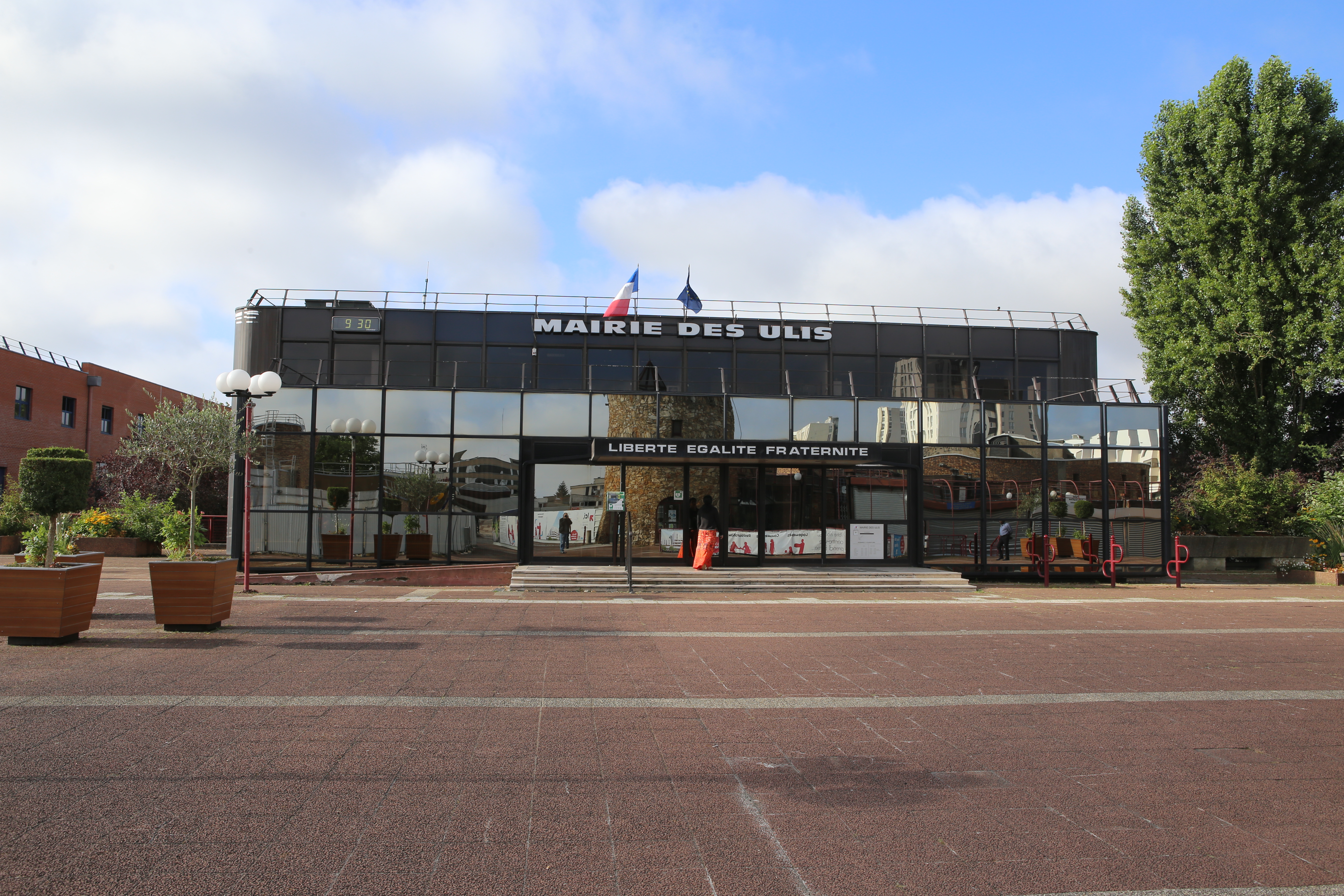
The Hôtel de Ville, completed in 1976

The discovery in 1977 of Bronze Age tools in the neighbouring town of Villejust suggests the possibility of pre-historic human occupation of the area that is today Les Ulis. During the Roman era, villas rustica occupied the Courtabœuf plateau. One, the "Villa Bona" gives its name to nearby Villebon-sur-Yvette. A number were constructed by a property owner named Uslo, whose name might conceivably be connected to that of Les Ulis. It is also possible that the name is related to the Old French usler, meaning to raze by fire. The area was at one time wooded, but was cleared during the Middle Ages.

The name "Ullys" is first recorded as that of a feudal fee in a monastic inventory of 1382. In 1712, this land is recorded as belonging to Charles Boucher, an important Parisian civil servant. In 1767, it was transferred to Count Pierre Gaspard Marie Grimod d'Orsay.

A significant farm of 160 hectares, the Grand Vivier, occupied much of the land. It raised cattle and sheep and cultivated wheat, potato, strawberry and beet. There was also a distillery on the land.

The Ligne de Sceaux railway opened in 1867, passing just to the west of the present-day town.

The development of the Courtabœuf industrial park was decided on in 1960, accompanied on 30 November that year by a decision to create a priority development zone for ten thousand homes to sit alongside it. 265 hectares of land comprising four farms, previously belonging to the communes of Bures-sur-Yvette and Orsay, were set aside for this housing project.

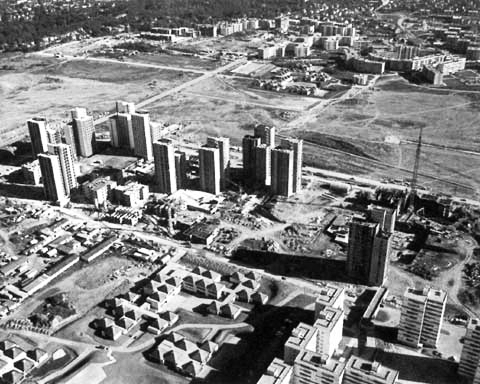
Les Ulis as a building site, 1977

On 13 March 1964, an urban district of Bures-Orsay was established to oversee the development of the area. Road and utilities for the industrial zone were completed by July 1966, with the first business, AtoChem (part of what is now Total S.A.), moving in the following year. Hewlett-Packard created its French headquarters in the industrial zone in 1968. In the same year, the first residents moved into Les Ulis, although running water was not yet available in all homes.

The first municipal council for Les Ulis was elected in 1971. In 1973, a shopping centre, Ulis 2, was opened under the auspices of Carrefour. The Hôtel de Ville was completed in 1976.

A census of 1975 records 20,283 people living in Les Ulis. Because this was significantly greater than the populations of both Bures-sur-Yvette and Orsay, which shared administrative responsibility for the town, a local plebiscite was held on 14 March 1976, to decide between three propositions: maintaining the status quo; creating a new commune comprising the three towns; creating a new commune for Les Ulis. Just over 50% of voters in Orsay and Bures-sur-Yvette favoured the last option, whereas a majority in Les Ulis favoured a commune comprising the three towns. Both municipal councils voted in favour of the creation of a new commune for Les Ulis. The Prefect of Essonne, Paul Cousserand, created Les Ulis as the 196th commune of the department on 17 February 1977.

In March 1977, Paul Lorident was elected mayor of Les Ulis, whilst the town remained in construction. He oversaw the building of a market, a hybrid library and a cultural centre, named after the writer Boris Vian.

In 1985, it became the seat of a canton.

In September 2015, GlaxoSmithKline announced that it would close its R&D center in the commune. Previously, the site had employed 70 people.

In May 2026, Mistral AI announced plans to build a 10-megawatt data center within the commune, to become operational by Q3 2026.

== Population ==
Inhabitants of Les Ulis are known as Ulissiens.

Historical population
Year	Pop.	±% p.a.
1975	20,316	—
1982	28,256	+4.83%
1990	27,197	−0.48%
1999	25,785	−0.59%
2007	24,528	−0.62%
2012	24,783	+0.21%
2017	25,208	+0.34%
2023	25,886	+0.44%
Source: INSEE

== Notable people ==
- Retired football player Thierry Henry, who played for the France national team, was born and raised in Les Ulis.
- Manchester United football player Anthony Martial grew up in Les Ulis and played for the local football team CO Les Ulis as a child.
- Football player Patrice Evra, who played for the France national team, was raised in Les Ulis.
- The former spokesman of the ecological French party, Stéphane Pocrain, was raised in Les Ulis and was almost elected for the town's constituency (with the other towns of Gif-sur-Yvette, Orsay etc...) in 2002.
- Supermodel Noémie Lenoir was born in Les Ulis before her family moved to a very quiet life first in Gif-sur-Yvette and then in Versailles where she was discovered and started her career in modeling.
- Writer Patrick Lapeyre (author of the award-winning L'homme-sœur) is a teacher in Les Ulis' high school (Lycée de l'Essouriau).
- Rapper Sinik, was born central Paris, moved to Les Ulis at age four.
- Gilbert Bayiha N'Djema, footballer
- Tristan Dingome, footballer
- Moussa Marega, footballer
- Abdoulaye Cissoko, footballer
- Patrice Vigier, self-taught luthier and founder of Vigier Guitars, was originally from Les Ulis.

== Economy ==
The biggest industrial area (tertiary) in Europe is concentrated in Parc d'Activité de Courtabœuf (area: 378 ha) with more than 1,000 companies employing 24,500 people. This area is spread over three communes: Les Ulis (mainly), Villebon-sur-Yvette and Villejust. Many companies such as Hewlett-Packard have their French head offices in this area. Apple left Les Ulis in 2007.

== Twin towns – sister cities ==
Les Ulis is twinned with:

- Naumburg, Germany
- Sátão, Portugal
- Sédhiou, Senegal
- Thetford, England, United Kingdom

== See also ==
- Communes of the Essonne department
- CO Les Ulis
