= Ballainvilliers =

Commune in Île-de-France, France

- Commune
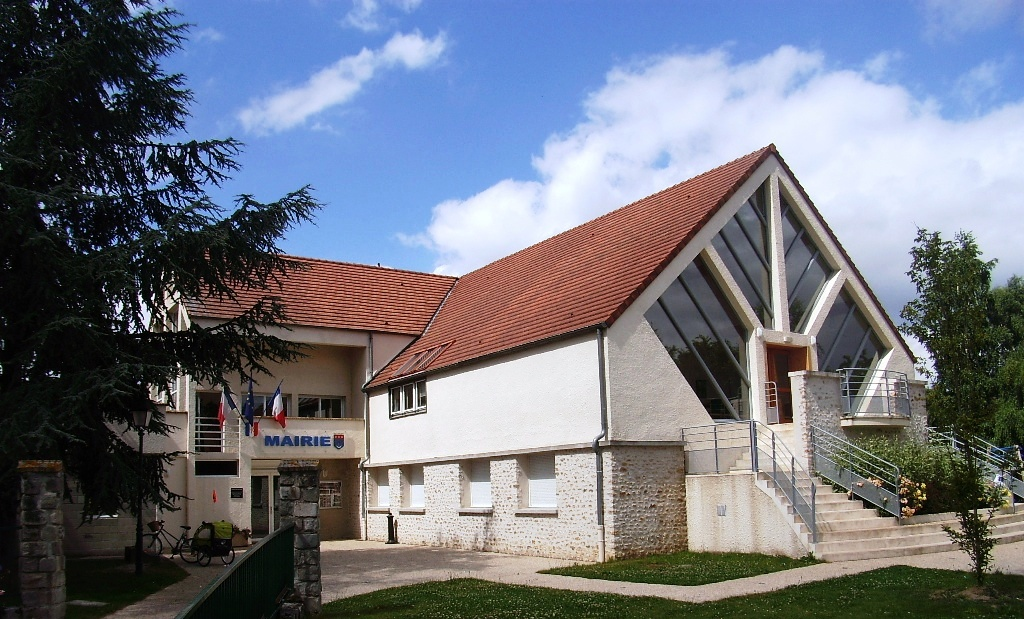
- The town hall of Ballainvilliers

- Coat of arms
- Location of Ballainvilliers
- Location within France Location within Île-de-France (region)
- Coordinates: 48°40′34″N 2°17′24″E
- Country: France
- Region: Île-de-France
- Department: Essonne
- Arrondissement: Palaiseau
- Canton: Longjumeau
- Intercommunality: CA Paris-Saclay

Government
  - Mayor (2020–2026): Stéphanie Gueu-Viguier
- Area^{1}: 4.01 km^{2} (1.55 sq mi)
- Highest elevation: 106 m (348 ft)
- Lowest elevation: 60 m (200 ft)
- Population (2023): 4,904
  - Density: 1,220/km^{2} (3,170/sq mi)
- Time zone: UTC+01:00 (CET)
  - Summer (DST): UTC+02:00 (CEST)
- INSEE/Postal code: 91044 /91160
- ^{1} French Land Register data, which excludes lakes, ponds, glaciers > 1 km^{2} (0.386 sq mi or 247 acres) and river estuaries.

Ballainvilliers (French: [balɛ̃vilje]) is a commune in the Essonne department in Île-de-France in northern France.

== Population ==
Historical population
Year	Pop.	±% p.a.
1968	935	—
1975	1,589	+7.87%
1982	2,218	+4.88%
1990	2,531	+1.66%
1999	2,749	+0.92%
2007	3,780	+4.06%
2012	3,914	+0.70%
2017	4,581	+3.20%
2023	4,904	+1.14%
Source: INSEE

Inhabitants of Ballainvilliers are known as Ballainvillois in French.

== See also ==
- Communes of the Essonne department
