= Constantine Andreou =

Greek Brazilian painter and sculptor

- Andreou in 1954.
- Born: 24 March 1917; São Paulo, Brazil
- Died: 8 October 2007 (aged 90); Athens, Greece
- Known for: Painting, sculpture
- Notable work: Globe – Trinité (1974)
- Awards: Grand Prix Antoine Pevsner (1988), Croix de Chevalier de la Légion d'honneur (2000), Officier de l'Ordre des Arts et des Lettres (2005)

Constantine Andreou (Greek: Κωνσταντίνος Ανδρέου; 24 March 1917 – 8 October 2007) was a Brazilian-born Greek painter and sculptor with a highly successful career that spanned six decades. Andreou has been praised by many as an eminent figure in international art of the 20th century.

== Biography ==
=== Early life (1917–1945) ===
Andreou was born in São Paulo, Brazil, in 1917 to Greek parents who had immigrated to Brazil a few years prior.

In 1925, his family moved back to Greece where he settled in Athens until the end of World War II. During these years, Andreou dabbled in crafts and for a period worked as a carpenter making furniture while studying technical design. He graduated in 1935. In the same year, he started his study of sculpture, the art form for which he would be most known later.

In 1939, Andreou participated at the Panellinio (Πανελλήνιο), but the judges disqualified his three sculptures. In 1942, he tried again at the same competition and with the same artwork. The pieces were so lifelike, he was accused of cheating by copying nature. Three major personalities of the time in Greece, Memos Makris, John Miliades, and Nikos Nikolaou, came to his defense. As a result of the publicity, he had his first taste of fame and major exposure of his artwork.

In 1940, Greece entered World War II on the side of the Allies, and by 1941, the country was under Nazi and Italian occupation. Andreou was initially drafted into the Hellenic Army in 1940 and during the occupation he was an active member of the Greek Resistance.

The war years and occupation did not stop Andreou from continuing his artwork and studies, and in 1945 he won a French scholarship to go to France along with many other Greek intellectuals on the Mataroa voyage.

=== Life in France (1945–2002) ===
Painting by Andreou

In 1947, Andreou began using a new personal technique employing welded brass sheets. This new technique allowed him to create a new way to express his creation in a way completely unrelated to tradition.

A major impact on Andreou's method of expression and in the development of his personal "language" was his friendship with Le Corbusier. They first met in 1947 and worked together on and off until 1953. At one time Le Corbusier asked Andreou, "Where did you learn how to work?" to which Andreou responded "I'm Greek, I carry the knowledge within me." This friendship instilled in Andreou Le Corbusier's view of architecture as monumental sculpture and, conversely, sculpture subject to the laws of architecture.

In the same period, Andreou became a member of a select group of philosophers, including Jean-Paul Sartre, who discussed various topics in Saint-Germain-des-Prés.

Andreou had an exhibition in Paris in 1951, where he demonstrated the transformation of his style. In the group exhibition "Seven Greek Sculptors", Andreou was characterized as "the most famous Greek sculptor in the capital with a rich, varied and successful work". By the end of the decade, Andreou was widely known in the French art scene and considered an equal to Mondrian, Picasso and Gastaud. In 1982, he was given the lead as chairman of the Paris "Autumn Salon" for sculpture.

In 1998, the town of La Ville-du-Bois, where Andreou resided while in France, decided to name its library in honor of Constantine Andreou.

Throughout his time in France, he regularly visited his friends and family in Greece and many times exhibited his work in various cities and islands there. In 1977, Andreou bought a centuries old winery on the island of Aegina. He converted it into a house, after being influenced to buy a house on the island by his longtime friend and colleague Nikos Nikolaou. There in ancient Aegina in the summer of 1985, together with the namesake poet Evangelos Andreou, Constantine Andreou created a series of twenty paintings entitled "Polymorphs" that were based on the poet's work "Restoration of a Stone Stalk". (Ανδρέου-Ανδρέου/Andreou-Andreou 1987)

Andreou has also participated in the Biennales of Antwerp, the Netherlands, Paris, Venice, and Yugoslavia.

=== Later years and death (2002–2007) ===
Constantine Andreou returned to Greece in 2002. He died on 8 October 2007 at his house in Athens, Greece.

== Legacy ==
In 2004, Andreou created the "Costas Andreou Foundation" with the stated goal to promote his work in the arts and the significance of sculpture and painting worldwide. The foundation was also to recognize young and upcoming artists every 3 years with an award, based on the decision of an international judging committee. The first award was given in 2008.

== Awards ==
- Grand Prix Antoine Pevsner, 1988
- Croix de Chevalier de la Légion d'honneur, 2000
- Officier de l'Ordre des Arts et des Lettres, 2005

== See also ==
- Légion d'honneur
- Ordre des Arts et des Lettres
- La Ville-du-Bois
