= Linas, Essonne =

Commune in Île-de-France, France

Linas
- Commune
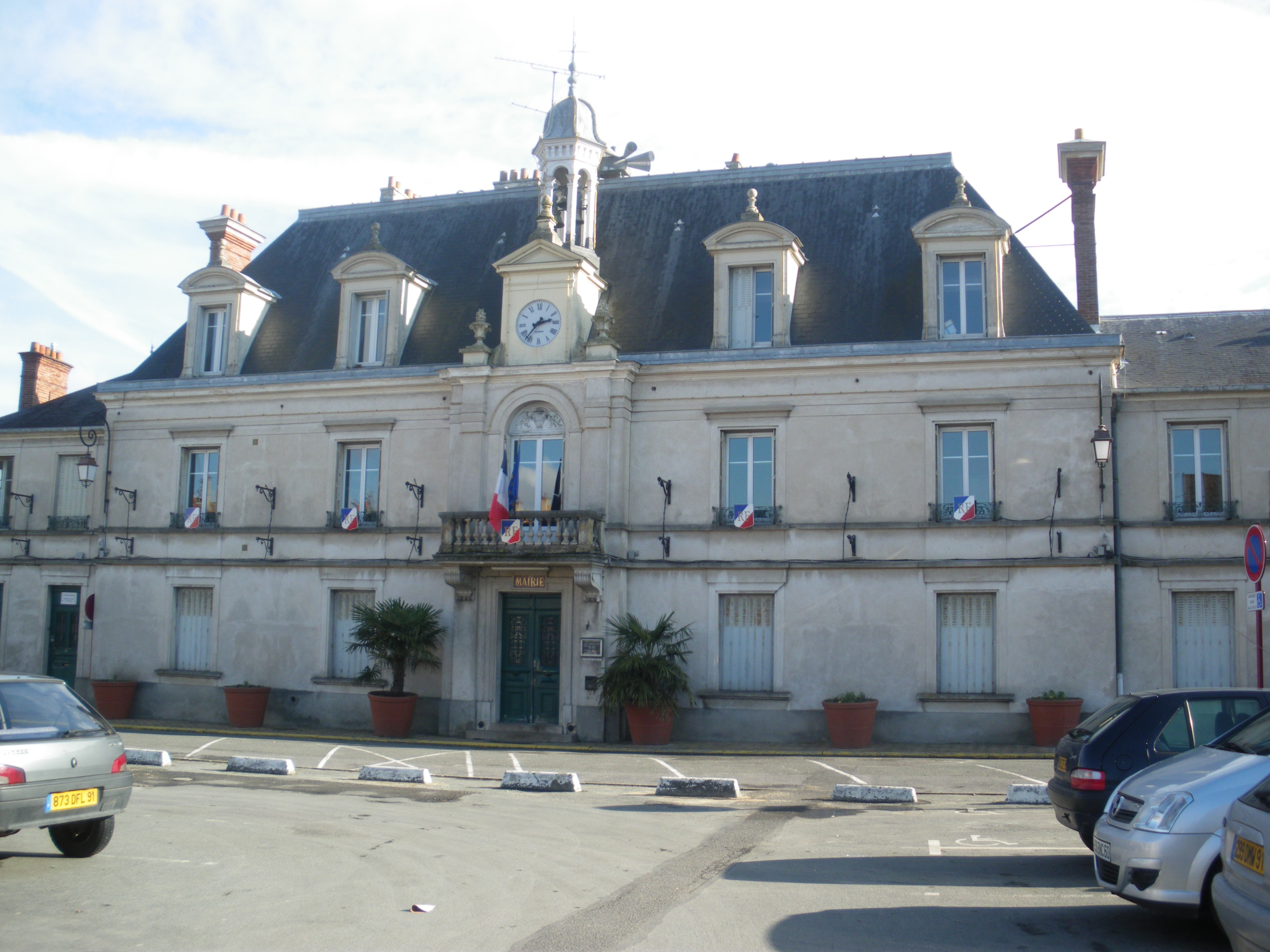
- The town hall in Linas

- Coat of arms
- Location of Linas
- Location within France Location within Île-de-France (region)
- Coordinates: 48°37′53″N 2°16′00″E
- Country: France
- Region: Île-de-France
- Department: Essonne
- Arrondissement: Palaiseau
- Canton: Longjumeau
- Intercommunality: CA Paris-Saclay

Government
  - Mayor (2020–2026): Christian Lardiere
- Area^{1}: 7.51 km^{2} (2.90 sq mi)
- Highest elevation: 168 m (551 ft)
- Lowest elevation: 46 m (151 ft)
- Population (2023): 7,987
  - Density: 1,060/km^{2} (2,750/sq mi)
- Time zone: UTC+01:00 (CET)
  - Summer (DST): UTC+02:00 (CEST)
- INSEE/Postal code: 91339 /91310
- ^{1} French Land Register data, which excludes lakes, ponds, glaciers > 1 km^{2} (0.386 sq mi or 247 acres) and river estuaries.

Linas (French pronunciation: [linas] or [lina]) is a commune in the Essonne department in Île-de-France in northern France.

The famous motor racing circuit Autodrome de Linas-Montlhéry (often abbreviated as "Montlhéry") is located across the communes of Linas, Bruyères-le-Châtel and Ollainville.

== Population ==
Inhabitants of Linas are known as Linois in French.

Historical population
Year	Pop.	±% p.a.
1968	2,156	—
1975	2,830	+3.96%
1982	4,042	+5.22%
1990	4,767	+2.08%
1999	4,970	+0.46%
2007	6,290	+2.99%
2012	6,647	+1.11%
2017	6,785	+0.41%
2023	7,987	+2.76%
Source: INSEE

== See also ==
- Communes of the Essonne department
