= Marcoussis =

Commune in Île-de-France, France

- Commune
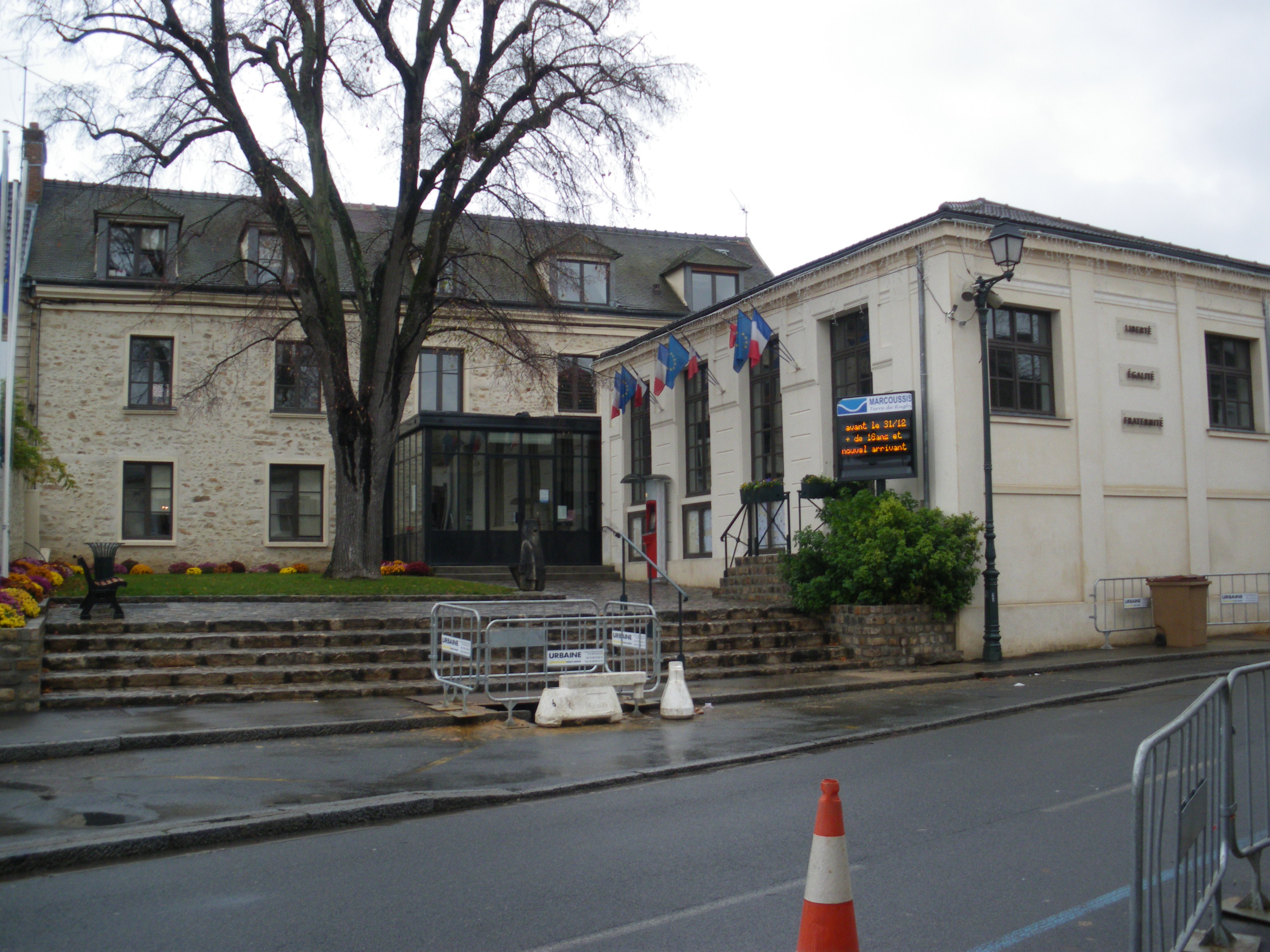
- The town hall in Marcoussis

- Coat of arms
- Location of Marcoussis
- Location within France Location within Île-de-France (region)
- Coordinates: 48°38′33″N 2°13′51″E
- Country: France
- Region: Île-de-France
- Department: Essonne
- Arrondissement: Palaiseau
- Canton: Les Ulis
- Intercommunality: CA Paris-Saclay

Government
  - Mayor (2020–2026): Olivier Thomas
- Area^{1}: 16.8 km^{2} (6.5 sq mi)
- Population (2023): 8,618
  - Density: 513/km^{2} (1,330/sq mi)
- Time zone: UTC+01:00 (CET)
  - Summer (DST): UTC+02:00 (CEST)
- INSEE/Postal code: 91363 /
- ^{1} French Land Register data, which excludes lakes, ponds, glaciers > 1 km^{2} (0.386 sq mi or 247 acres) and river estuaries.

Marcoussis (French pronunciation: [maʁkusi]) is a commune in the southern suburbs of Paris, France. It is located 24.8 km (15.4 mi) from the center of Paris.

Marcoussis is the location of the CNR (National Centre of Rugby) where the French national rugby union team prepare for international competitions. It is at the CNR that the Linas-Marcoussis Agreement was signed in January 2003 between belligerents in the Ivorian Civil War.

A market village until the 1960s, Marcoussis supplied the markets of Paris with tomatoes and strawberries. A small train route, the Arpajonnais, inaugurated in 1894, took food at 4am every morning, it ceased functioning in 1937.

== Geography ==
Marcoussis is located to the south of Paris, between the Reoute National RN20, in the east and Autoroute A10 to the west and trunk road RN104 called the Francilienne to the south. It is crossed by the RN446, and a small river of the Orge, called Sallemouille (previously called Gadanine).

=== Neighboring communes ===
- Linas;
- Montlhéry;
- Nozay;
- Saint-Jean-de-Beauregard;
- La Ville-du-Bois;
- Ollainville;
- Fontenay;
- Janvry;
- Les Ulis;
- Villejust.

== Population ==
Inhabitants are officially called the Marcoussissiens in French or according to other sources are called the Marcoussiens.

Historical population
Year	Pop.	±% p.a.
1968	2,635	—
1975	3,980	+6.07%
1982	4,465	+1.66%
1990	5,680	+3.05%
1999	7,226	+2.71%
2007	7,736	+0.86%
2012	8,007	+0.69%
2017	8,139	+0.33%
2023	8,618	+0.96%
Source: INSEE

== List of successive mayors ==
- March 1977- March 1983, Jean Montaru - socialist party
- March 1983- May 1986, M Jean Montaru (décédé during the course of mandate) - socialist party
- June 1986- March 1989, Marc Nogues - socialist party
- March 1989- March 1995 Daniel Hochet - centre-right
- March 1995- January 2003 Eric Cochard - socialist party
- January 2003- 2014 Olivier Thomas - socialist party, councillor of Île-de-France region

== History ==
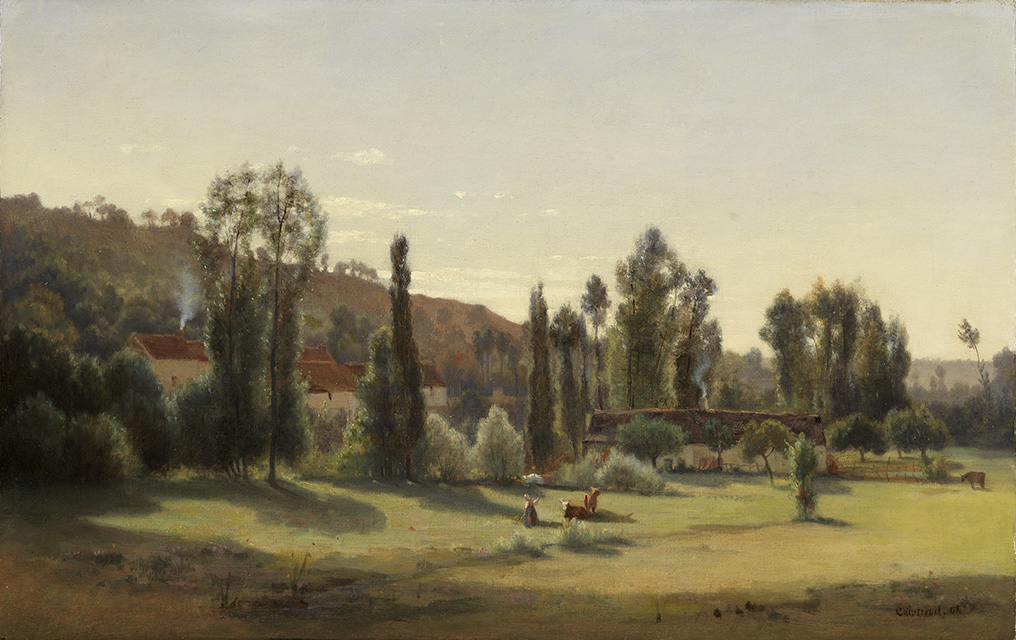
Antoine Chintreuil, Landscape near Marcoussis (1864), Staatliche Kunsthalle, Karlsruhe.

Very old traces of occupation exist, in particular a polishing machine found on the southern slope of the valley. The village really started to develop around the priory of Wandrille Saint, depending on the Abbey of Saint-Wandrille. In 854, a charter of Charles the Bald mentions Marcoussis. Initially, it would only be absolutely necessary for one vineyard at Bution, near to Arpajon. The monks losing Bution settled in Marcoussis at the beginning of the 12th century. The absence of records prevents an exact description of the priory at the time. It is known that in 1298, there was only one monk and that the village had 120 inhabitants. Célestins arrived at the beginning of the 15th century, and absorbed the possessions of the old ruined priory. But the history of Marcoussis also includes the construction desired by Jean de Montagu in 1404–1408. Minister of Finance for Charles VI of France he built his castle here (of which only the base and a tower remains, known as the Oubliettes), the convent of Célestins (remains of the cellars and a portion of the gate) and ordered the rebuilding of the village church. The church shelters a superb marble statue of the Virgin Mary donated by Jean de Berry to the convent of Célestins. The kings came to hunt at Marcoussis and there remains the royal house built under Louis XV. There was a commandry of the order of Saint Jean of Jerusalem from the 13th century (Brother Baudoyn commander of the "meson of the flood" in 1290); a vault is still visible. On the plateau close to Nozay, an important establishment of Alcatel shelters research laboratories.

=== Recent times ===
Since 2002, the field of Bellejame to the east of the commune, abandoned for decades, saw the building of the CNR (National Centre of Rugby), where the French team trains.

The Kleber Accords were signed at the CNR in January 2003 between the government of Côte d'Ivoire and the rebels of the North.

On 29 July 2007, for the first time, the town was the departure place for the 20th stage of the 2007 Tour de France.

== Notable people ==
- Catherine Henriette de Balzac d'Entragues, was the daughter of the Lord of Marcoussis, François de Balzac d' Entragues, she was the mistress of Henry IV of France, who had promised marriage to her.
- Jean-Jacques Rousseau spent a few days in Marcoussis in 1750–1751 about which he speaks in the Confessions
- Jean-Baptiste-Camille Corot regularly travelled to Marcoussis to visit fellow artist Ernest-Joachim Dumax, including in the summers of 1855, 1857, and 1867. His La Charrette, souvenir de Marcoussis is at the Musée d'Orsay.
- Victor Adolphe Malte-Brun, geographer, died in his property at Marcoussis, in the street which bears his name today.
- Louis Marcoussis, painter of Polish extraction, gallicized his name Markus to Marcoussis on the advice of his friend, Guillaume Apollinaire.
- Count Aymar de la Baume Pluvinel, astronomer, member of the Academy of Sciences, pioneer of the photography of the celestial bodies.
- Ib Braase, Danish modern artist and sculptor who lived and worked here from 1968 until his death in 2009.
- Léo Roussel, racing driver, was born in Marcoussis.

== Transport ==
Marcoussis is not served by a station on the Paris Métro, (RER), or the suburban rail network. The closest station to Marcoussis is Saint-Michel-sur-Orge station on the Paris RER line. This station is located in the commune of Saint-Michel-sur-Orge, 5.7 km (3.5 mi) from the center of Marcoussis.

== Events ==
The strawberry festival continues although the mass growing of strawberries disappeared at the start of the 1980s, whereas it was formerly produced locally in great quantity.

=== Bineau carnival ===
Each year in spring, the carnival of Bineau fills the streets of the village. This carnival is, according to certain sources, dedicated to the minister Jean-Martial Bineau (1805–1855) who under Napoleon III, took unpopular measures by decreasing State spending. The carnival takes place in the following towns: Arpajon, Leuville-on-Barley, Nozay, City-of-Wood. Marcoussis is not in the official procession of floats and majorettes, but has a festival organised by its citizens. A covered puppet in black trousers and a tail coat, capped with a hat top hat, and girds of a tricolour scarf is carried by the young people who are 18 years that year (formerly conscripts, nowadays boys and girls) dressed in the same costume. They are followed by the dressed up tanks and inhabitants. For certain groups the preparation for "' 'Bineau' '" lasts several months (choice of the theme, of the costumes and construction of the float which are drawn by a tractor). For the last ten years several groups have mobilized to make this festival a success. The procession starts at around 3pm, crosses the town by the main street from east to west to finish in Place de la Republique at dusk. Along the way, several stops take place among the houses of people who liberally offer drink to those in the procession. Bineau is placed at the top of a large heap of straw, piled-up over previous days, and set alight. The crowd forms a large farandole around the fire until it goes out. It is one of the great moments in the life of the commune where the joy and good mood reign as Masters, and which many Marcoussisiens would not miss under any pretext.

== Cultural heritage ==
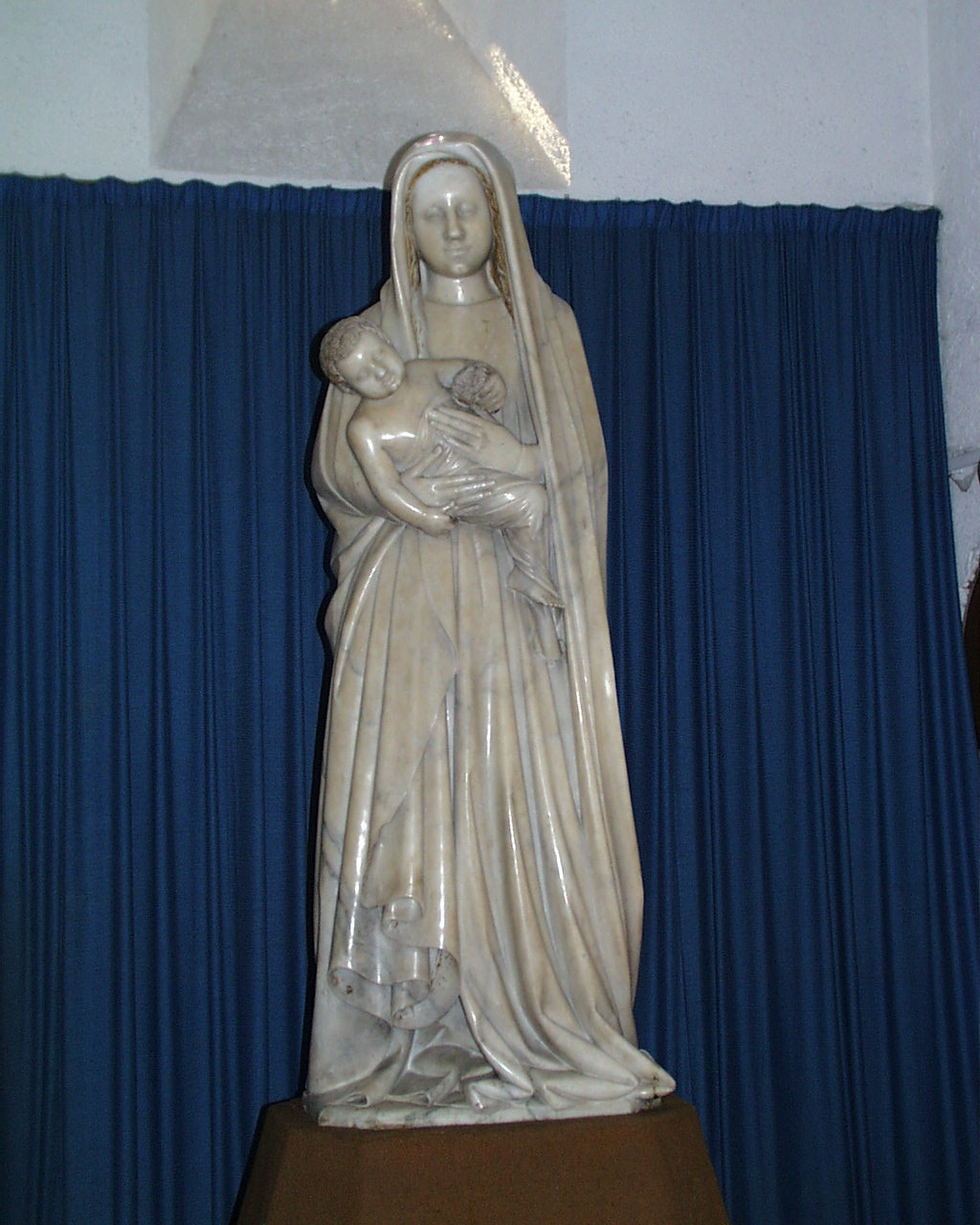
Marble statue of the Virgin Mary (Sainte-Madeleine church)

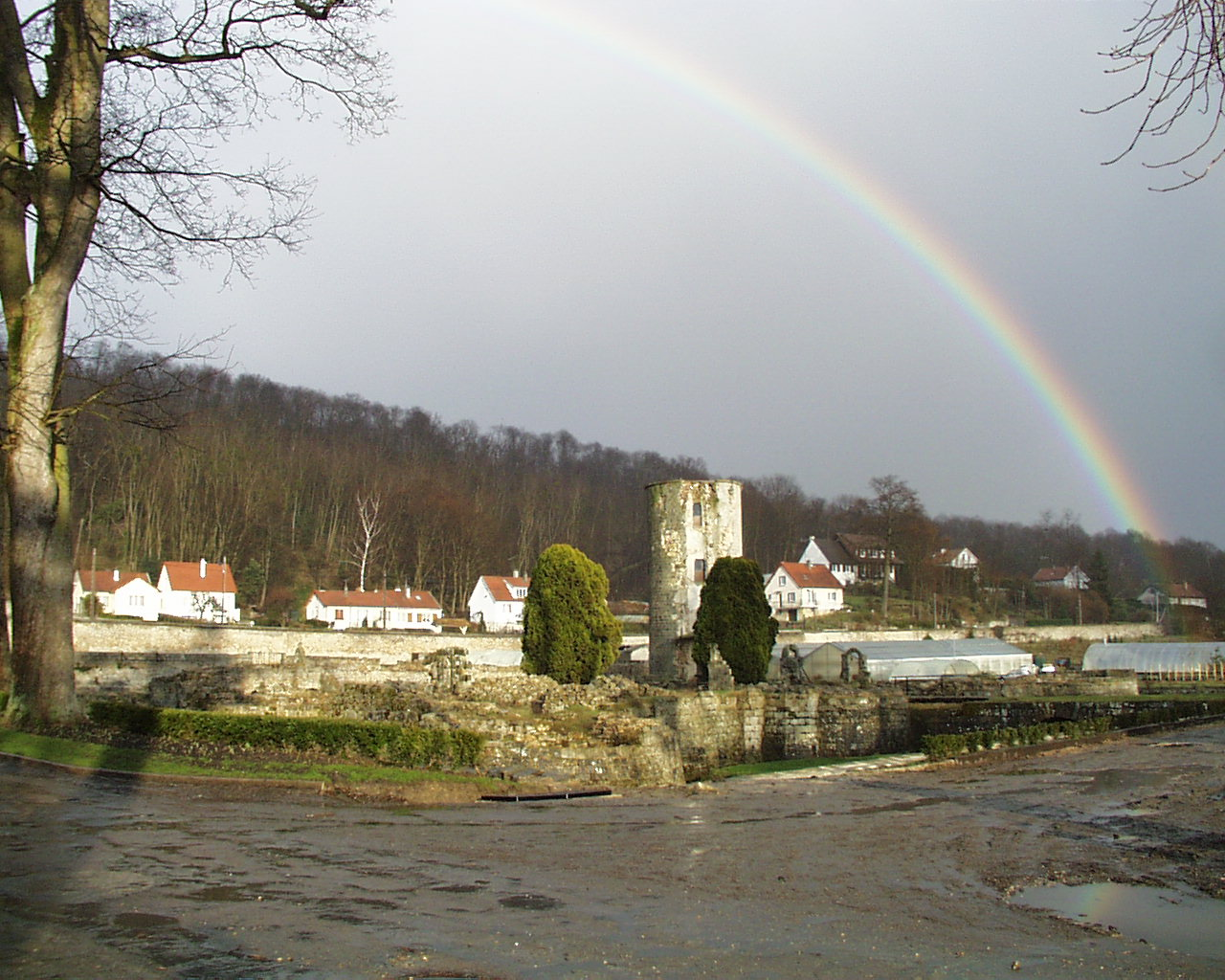
Ruins of the Château de Jean de Montagu

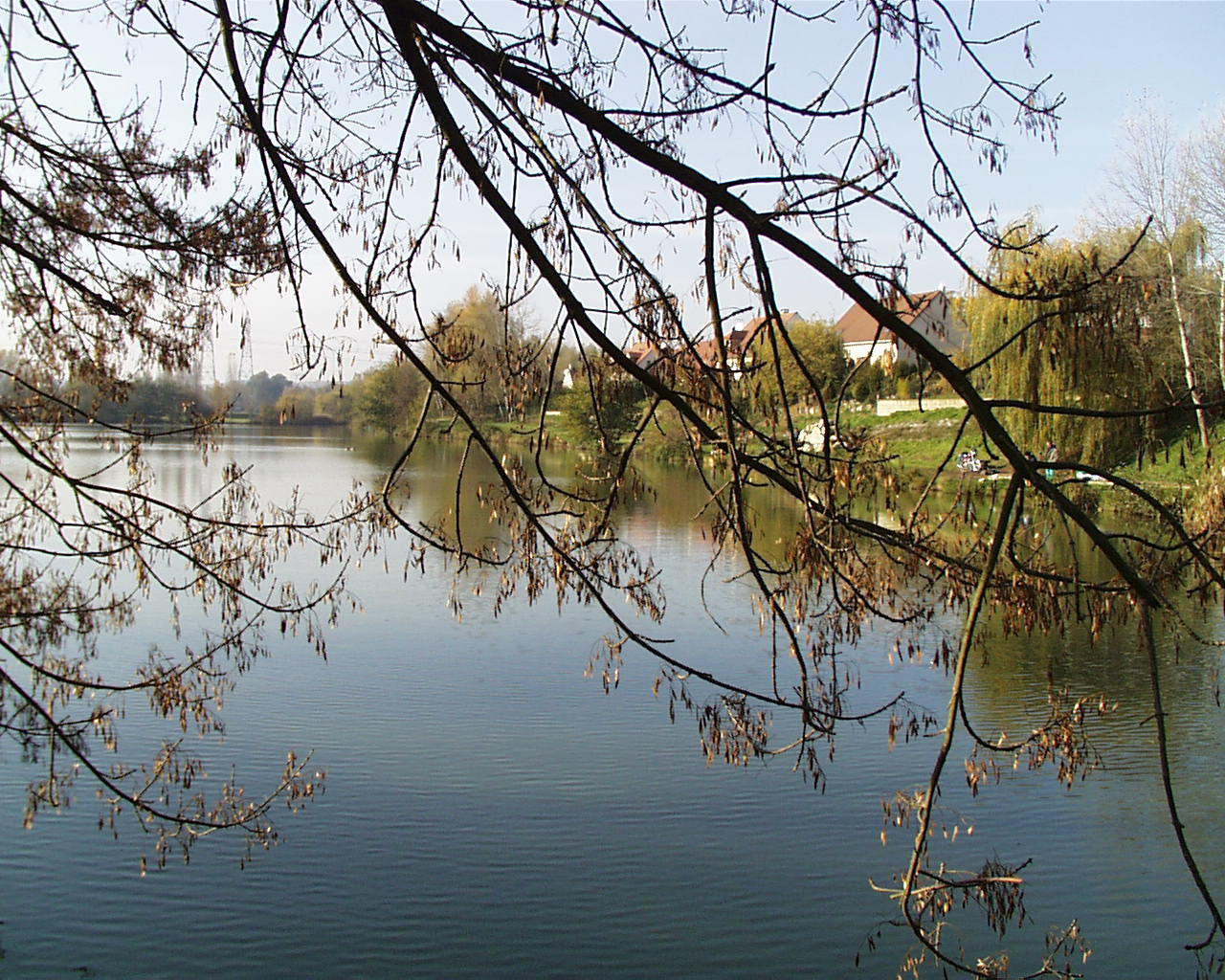
Gue lake

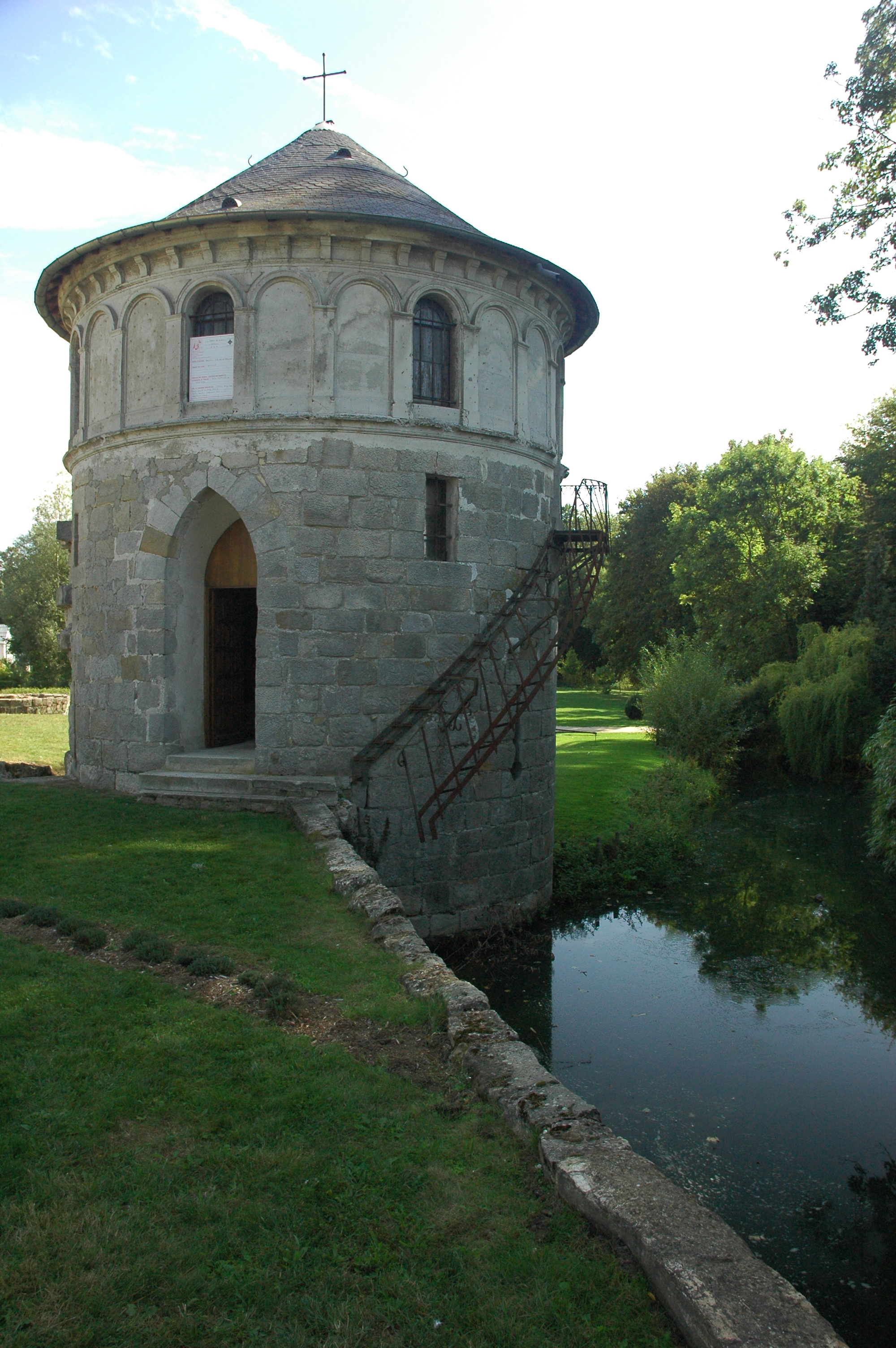

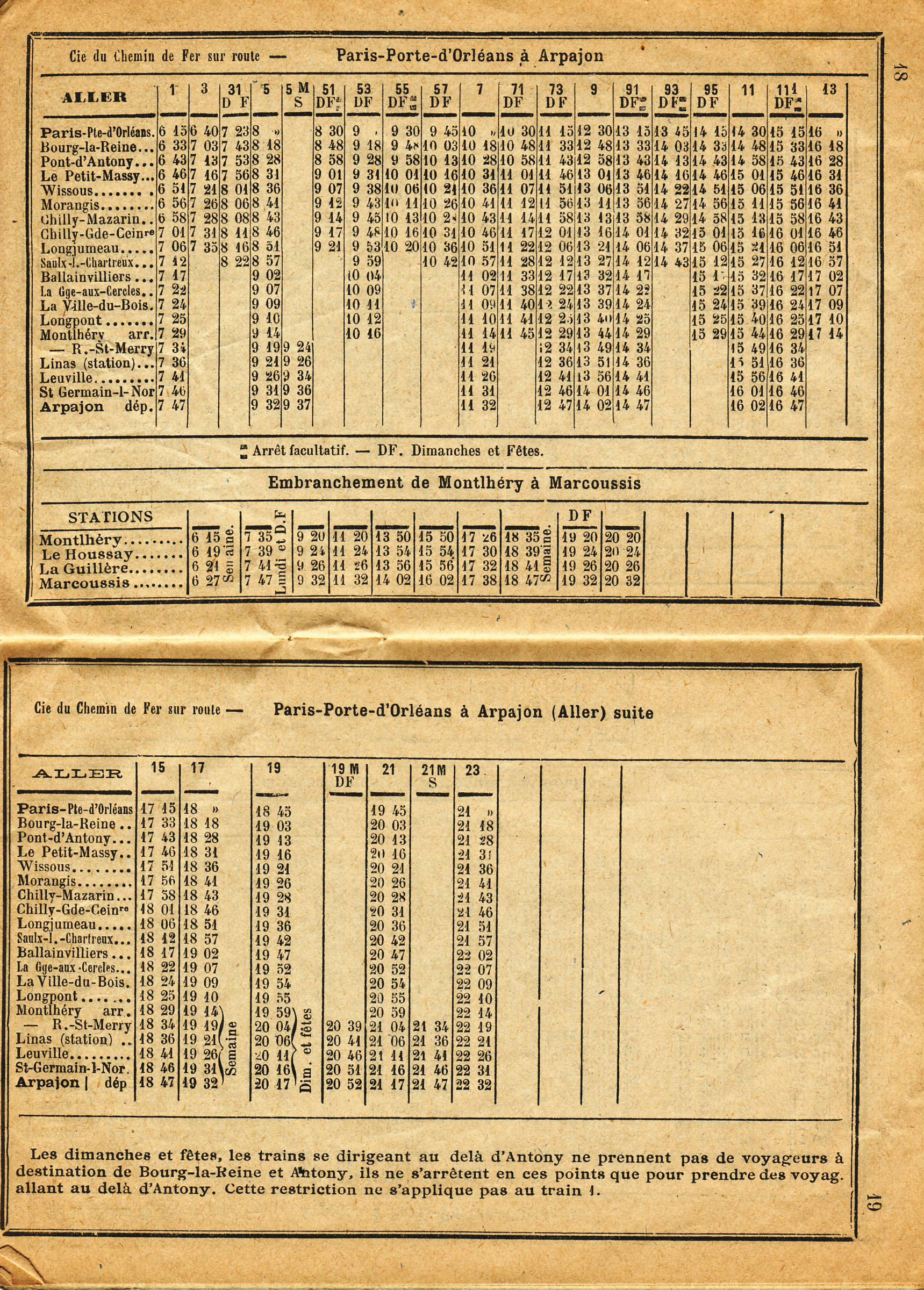
Itinerary of the Arpajonnais, during summer 1926: Paris - Arpajon and Marcoussis

=== Parish church ===
The parish church Sainte-Marie-Madeleine was built by Jean de Montagu at the same time as its castle at the beginning of the 15th century, it is registered on the additional inventory of historic buildings by decree of December 17, 1965. The nave with three spans was built in the middle of 16th century by Jeanne d' Amboise, daughter of the amiral de Graville whose armorial bearings decorate the key of central crossing. One can admire inside the church a Virgin with the Child in marble of Carrara, of 2 meters height, œuvre of Jean de Cambrai for John, Duke of Berry who made of it gift with the monastery of Célestins in 1408, it was classified as a historic building as of 1896. The frontage is of style Gothic architecture blazing, the door is sumontée of a contour in accordance, the stained glass with the top of the door of entry represents the armorial bearings of the lords of Marcoussis: Montagu, Graville, Balzac and Iliers d' Entragues and Esclignac.

=== Vestiges of the castle of Montagu ===
Was given to the orphans apprentices of Auteuil in 1940, by Genevieve de la Baume-Pluvinel, as well as the grounds and the modern castle, with the proviso of making it a school of horticulture which would bear the name of Saint-Anthony in homage to her brother who died at 18 years of age during the First World War. What remains today and is protected:

- the tower of the chatelet of entry,
- the tower of the oubliettes and grounds with levelling of the castle, classified with the title of historic buildings by a state decree of July 9, 1984,
- arched cellars, registered on the additional Inventory of Historic Buildings by a decree of 21 December 1984.

=== Castle of Célestins ===
Owned by the commune and currently housing the school of Arts, built in 1859 on the site of the convent dedicated to the Holy Trinity which had been completed in 1408 and occupied by Célestins. The convent was set on fire at the time of the Wars of Religion then demolished at the start of the French Revolution.

=== Remains of the Castle of Bellejame ===
The castle was destroyed by fire in 1976 and the adjoining park now has the National Center of Rugby in its northern section. In the southern section, the park is managed by the general council of Essonne and has:

- The refrigerator which was used to store the ice recovered from nearby waters
- An arched source and;
- The remains of a hydraulic ram.

=== Old Bailiwick ===
This building is now used as leisure centre, it was built in the last quarter of the 18th century. Municipal property, indexed but not protected by the historic buildings decree.

=== Old Commandry of the Deluge ===
Ferme générale of the Deluge, including the vestiges of a vault dedicated to John the Baptist, dating from the 12th century and partially rebuilt in the fourteenth and seventeenth centuries. It is the only vestige of the time when it belonged to the Order of the Templars, before it passed into the hands of the Order of Malta, it was then joined together in Saint-Jean-de-Latran in Paris. Private property, it is listed by the historic buildings decree but not protected.

=== Castles and other residences ===
- House of the King: It was built under the reign of Louis XV to be used for royal hunts. It is now a private property, partially classified as a historic building by a decree of 26 November 1968 (protection of façades and roofs).
- Château du Bel-Ebat: Located on the plate, it was rebuilt in the 19th century, it is a private residence.
- Château of the Round Oak: Property of the Ministry for the Navy since 1946, it housed a radar research laboratory. Amongst other things the research covered applications on the development of the Nançay radio telescope.
- Castle of the Deluge: Located behind the old commandery, it was built in 1857; now private property.
- Field of Brambles: located more than 3 km (1.9 mi) from the centre of the village, it belongs to the commune of Bourg-la-Reine, which transformed it into a holiday centre, it is now abandoned.
- Ferme de l'Hôtel-Dieu: remarkable for its frame "to Philibert Delorme" dating from the beginning of the 19th century, it is located in rue de Voltaire in the Gue district.

== Twin towns ==
- - Waldsassen town of 7,483 inhabitants located in Bavaria (Germany) - twinned since 1970.
- - Bérégadougou, village of 8,000 inhabitants located in the province of Comoé in the south of Burkina Faso (Africa) - twinned since 1998.
- - Mariánské Lázně or Marianské Lazné (ex Marienbad in German), in Czech Republic, town of 14,300 inhabitants was twinned to Marcoussis by a pact of international friendship in 1995 which led to an oath of twinning in May 2005 and the official signature of twinning on 23 September 2006.
- (Scotland) - Newton Stewart - Newton stewart is paired with Marcoussis since 2013.

== Tour de France ==
In 2007, Marcoussis was the start of the final stage of the Tour de France. The stage was 130 km (81 mi) long and finished with eight laps of the traditional circuit around the Champs-Élysées.

== See also ==
- Communes of the Essonne department
- Marmousets
