= Catherine Louveau =

French Sociologist & scholar

Catherine Louveau (born 6 June 1950 in Champlan, died 5 May 2026) was a French sociologist and academic. She was president of the Institut Émilie-du-Châtelet.

Her work focuses on the conditions and challenges of women's access to sporting practices, and the sex differences of sporting practices.

She was professor emeritus at the Paris-Sud University.She died in 2026 the May 5th from cancer.

== Works ==
- Louveau, Catherine (2021-03-27). "Sexuation du travail sportif et construction sociale de la féminité". Cahiers du Genre (in French). 36 (1): 163–183. ISSN 1298-6046.
- Louveau, Catherine (2000-10-01). "Golden, but still girls". Le Monde diplomatique.
- Chimot, Caroline; Louveau, Catherine (2010-08-13). "Becoming a man while playing a female sport: The construction of masculine identity in boys doing rhythmic gymnastics". International Review for the Sociology of Sport. 45 (4). SAGE Publications: 436–456. doi:10.1177/1012690210373844. ISSN 1012-6902.
- Annick Davisse; Catherine Louveau, Sports, école, société : la part des femmes, Joinville-le-Pont : Actio, 1991. ISBN 9782906411067
- Davisse, A.; Louveau, C. (1997). Sports, école, société : la différence des sexes: Féminin, masculin et activités sportives. Espaces et Temps du Sport (in French). Editions L'Harmattan. ISBN 978-2-296-36293-2.
- Louveau, C. (2007). Sociologie du sport: Débats et critiques. Sports en Société (in French). Editions L'Harmattan. ISBN 978-2-296-15894-8.
