= Ib Braase =

Danish sculptor (1923–2009)

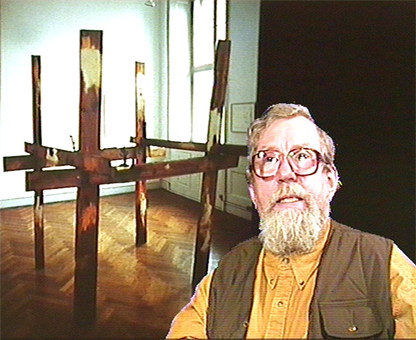
Ib Braase (1997)

Ib Valentin Braase (7 August 1923 – 18 March 2009) was a Danish sculptor. From 1968, he lived and worked in Marcoussis near Paris.

== Early life, family and education ==
Born in Stege on the island of Møn, Braase was the son of the stonemason Christian Braase who introduced him to the art of stonework. As a 14-year-old, he crafted his first busts of family members. He studied at the Royal Danish Academy of Fine Arts from 1949 to 1954 under Einar Utzon-Frank and Aksel Jørgensen, becoming the assistant of Astrid Noack with whom he created small stone figures.

== Career ==
After initially working with stone, in the 1950s Braase turned to bronze, embarking on a new, experimental phase which soon led him to abandon the traditional approach of the Academy. One of his acclaimed works from this period is Barneværelset (1969) which juxtaposes iron profiles and belongs to his bronze creations in an open structure. In 1968, he moved to Marcoussis near Paris where he developed an independent approach with unconventional materials such as bronze, iron, wood, zinc and paint in works resembling unfinished furniture or makeshift scaffolding.

Braase exhibited widely from 1949, first as a member of the Den Polychrome association, then in Den Frie Udstilling and Grønningen. His work has also been presented in numerous solo exhibitions in Denmark and France.

== Awards ==
In 1968, Braase was awarded the Eckersberg Medal and, in 1985, the Thorvaldsen Medal.
