= Hôtel de Ville, Les Ulis =

Town hall in Les Ulis, France

Hôtel de Ville
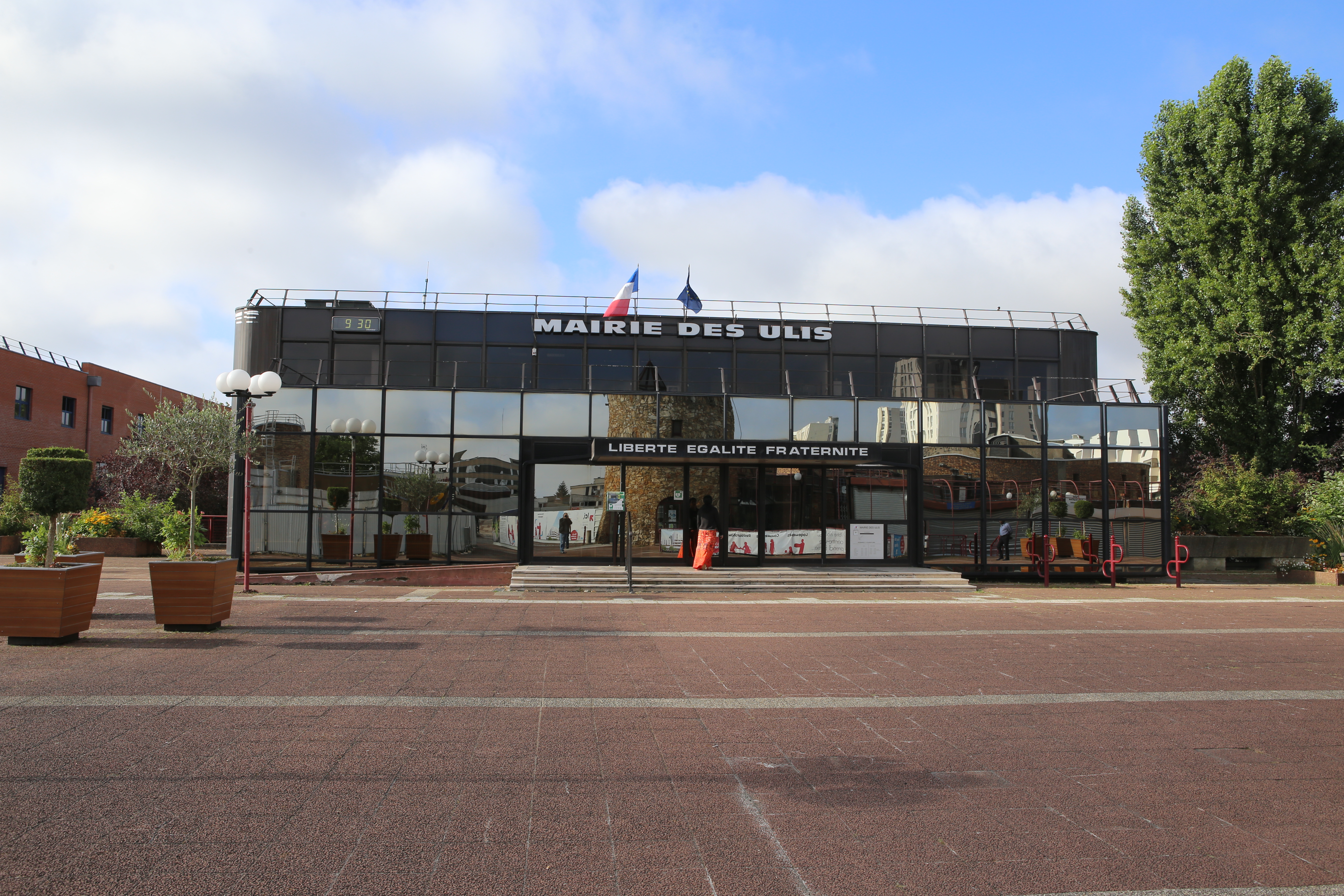
- The main frontage of the Hôtel de Ville in August 2016
- Interactive map of the Hôtel de Ville area

General information
- Type: City hall
- Architectural style: Modern style
- Location: Les Ulis, France
- Coordinates: 48.6814°N 2.1702°E
- Completed: 1976

Design and construction
- Architects: Robert Camelot, Jean-Claude Finelli and Michel Hennuyer

The Hôtel de Ville (French pronunciation: [otɛl də vil], City Hall) is a municipal building in Les Ulis, Essonne, in the southwestern suburbs of Paris, standing on Rue du Morva.

== History ==
After a Zone à Urbaniser en Priorité (priority development zone) was announced for parts of the communes of Bures-sur-Yvette and Orsay, an urban district council was established to oversee the development of the area on 13 March 1964. The new councillors, who were drawn from both communes, decided to commission a town hall. The site they selected, at the centre of the development, had previously been used as farmland. Construction of the new building started in 1974. It was designed by Robert Camelot, Jean-Claude Finelli and Michel Hennuyer in the modern style, built in concrete and glass and was completed in 1976.

The building was laid out in a square shape with rounded corners and a courtyard in the centre. The design involved a symmetrical main frontage of 16 bays facing onto the Esplanade de la République. It featured a single-storey entrance block of 14 bays, which was projected forward from the main structure. There was a glass doorway with a canopy across the central six bays. The other bays were fenestrated by dark-framed plate glass on both floors. The design also involved a separate structure to the southwest, also square-shaped, containing the Salle du Conseil (council chamber).

The building became the administrative centre of the commune of Les Ulis when it was officially established in February 1977. It formed part of an ensemble of structures on the Esplanade de la République at the core of the development area. These structures included the Centre Culturel Boris Vian (Boris Vian Culteral Centre) and the Médiathèque François-Mitterrand (François-Mitterrand Library), which were opened by the Minister of Commerce and Craft Industry, André Delelis, on 4 October 1981.

In October 2024, the Préfet of the Île-de-France designated the building as one of a series of local structures which exhibited "Architecture contemporaine remarquable" (Remarkable Contemporary Architecture).
