= Communauté d'agglomération Paris-Saclay =

Coordinates: 48°42′29″N 02°10′33″E

Paris-Saclay
- Communauté d'agglomération
- Location within the Essonne department
- Country: France
- Region: {{{region}}}
- Department: {{{department}}}
- No. of communes: {{{nbcomm}}}
- Established: 1 January 2016

Government
  - President: Grégoire de Lasteyrie (Horizons-LFA)
- Area: 185.9 km^{2} (71.8 sq mi)
- Population (2018): 314,169
  - Density: 1,690/km^{2} (4,377/sq mi)
- Website: paris-saclay.com

The Communauté d'agglomération Paris-Saclay (or CPS) is an administrative entity in the Essonne département, near Paris. The administrative center is Orsay. It was formed on 1 January 2016 by the merger of the former Communauté d'agglomération du Plateau de Saclay (CAPS) and the Communauté d'agglomération Europ'Essonne(E²). Its area is 185.9 km^{2}. Its population was 314,169 in 2018.

== Geography ==
=== Location ===
The Communauté d'Agglomération Paris-Saclay is located at the north-west of the département of Essonne, on the plateau de Saclay. The altitude is between 47m (154') in Palaiseau and 172m (564') in Gif-sur-Yvette.

=== Communes ===
The Communauté d'Agglomération Paris-Saclay consists of the following communes:

1. Ballainvilliers
2. Bures-sur-Yvette
3. Champlan
4. Chilly-Mazarin
5. Épinay-sur-Orge
6. Gif-sur-Yvette
7. Gometz-le-Châtel
8. Igny
9. Linas
10. Longjumeau
11. Marcoussis
12. Massy
13. Montlhéry
14. Nozay
15. Orsay
16. Palaiseau
17. Saclay
18. Saint-Aubin
19. Saulx-les-Chartreux
20. Les Ulis
21. Vauhallan
22. Verrières-le-Buisson
23. Villebon-sur-Yvette
24. La Ville-du-Bois
25. Villejust
26. Villiers-le-Bâcle
27. Wissous

== History ==
- At first, the syndicat intercommunal du plateau de Saclay (SIPS) was founded in 1988.
- The 6 December 1991, it became the district du plateau de Saclay (DIPS).
- It became a Communauté de communes then, in 2002, a Communauté d'agglomération.
- Before, communes of Bièvres in Essonne, Buc, Châteaufort, Jouy-en-Josas and Les Loges-en-Josas in Yvelines was in the district.
- In 2004, Gometz-le-Châtel integrates the CAPS.
- In 2010, the CAPS adheres at the syndicat mixte Paris Métropole.

== Transportation ==
=== Mass transit ===
Passenger rail service is provided in the community by RATP and Transilien SNCF in several RER stations in the Paris-Saclay University campus :

- Orsay-Ville station, RER B;
- Massy-Palaiseau station, RER B & C;
- Jouy-en-Josas station (HEC Paris), RER C and future T12;
- Lozère - École Polytechnique station, RER B;

And more in the Paris-Saclay and Versailles research campus :

- Saint-Quentin-en-Yvelines station, RER C and Transilien line N and line U;
- Versailles-Chantiers station, RER C and TER services.

=== Rail ===
The Paris-Saclay community has the LGV Atlantique high-speed rail line serving the Massy TGV station.

=== Buses ===
Transports in the Paris-Saclay community is managed by Paris-Saclay Mobilités and provided by Transdev and Keolis.

Long-distance bus service is provided by BlaBlaBus and Flixbus at Massy-Palaiseau RER and SNCF TGV station.
