= Route nationale 118 =

National road 118
- Route nationale 118

Location
- Country: France

Highway system
- Roads in France; Autoroutes; Routes nationales

Route nationale 118 is now a French route nationale from Sèvres to Les Ulis.

== History ==
The route was created in 1972. It takes the place of route nationale 187 between Sèvres and Meudon la Forêt, of the route nationale 306 between Saclay and Bièvres and of the route nationale 446 between Saclay and Orsay.

== Exit list ==
#	Destinations	Notes
	D 910 (Pont de Sèvres) – Paris (Porte de Saint-Cloud), Boulogne-Billancourt	Continuation beyond D7
1	D 7 – La Défense, Suresnes, Issy-les-Moulineaux, Sèvres, Saint-Cloud, Sèvres - Cité de la céramique, Pont de Saint-Cloud	Southbound exit and northbound entrance
2	D 181 / S 77 – Meudon (Centre), Chaville, Sèvres	
3	Meudon (La Forêt), Vélizy (Zone d'Emplois), Centre Commercial Régional	
	A 86 – Versailles, Rouen, Vélizy (Centre), Centre Commercial Régional	
4.1	Z.A. Villacoublay	
4.2	Z.A. du Val de Grâce	Southbound exit and entrance
5	A 86 – Créteil, Clamart, Paris (Porte de Châtillon), Petit Clamart	
6a	Jouy-en-Josas, Bièvres	
6b	Palaiseau, Igny, Massy (T.G.V.)	
7	Vauhallan	
8	Aéroport de Toussus-le-Noble, Saclay, Gif-sur-Yvette, Saint-Quentin-en-Yvelines	
9	Centre Universitaire (Grandes Écoles), Orsay (Le Guichet), Gif-sur-Yvette	
10	Orsay (Le Guichet)	No southbound exit
11	Orsay (Centre)	
12	A 10 – Palaiseau, Paris (Porte d'Orléans), Bures-sur-Yvette, Les Ulis (Centre, Quartiers Nord et Ouest)	Southbound exit and northbound entrance
13	Orsay (Mondétour), Z.A. de Courtabœuf	Southbound exit and northbound entrance
14	Chartres, Les Ulis (Quartiers Sud et Est), Orsay (Mondétour), Z.A. de Courtabœuf, Centre Commercial Régional, Marcoussis	
	N 104 – Lyon, Évry, Orléans, Linas, Montlhéry, Arpajon	Southbound exit and northbound entrance
	A 10 / E5 / E50 – Chartres, Nantes, Orléans, Bordeaux	Southbound exit and northbound entrance
