= Saulx-les-Chartreux =

Commune in Île-de-France, France

- Commune
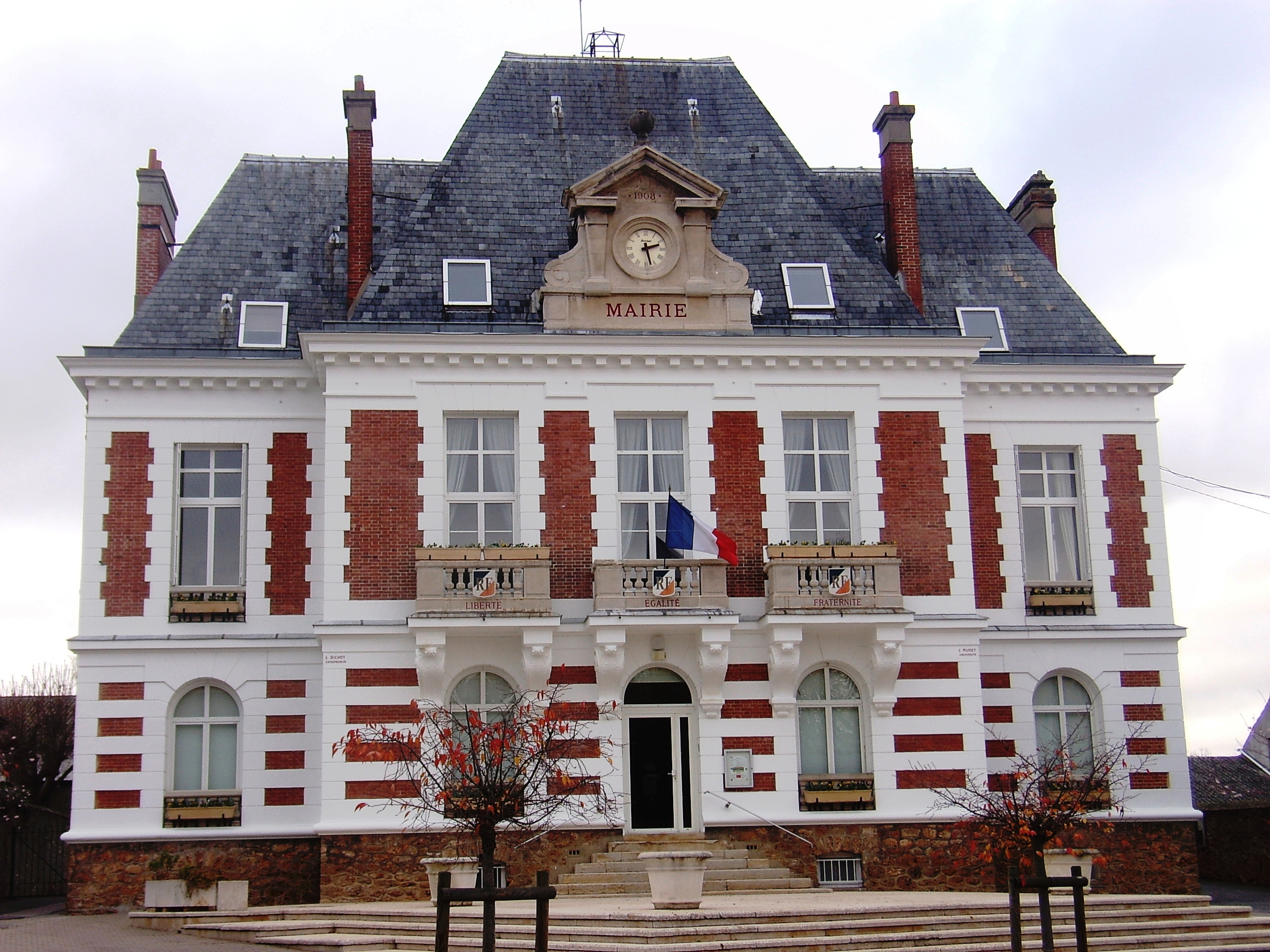
- The town hall in Saulx-les-Chartreux
- Location of Saulx-les-Chartreux
- Location within France Location within Île-de-France (region)
- Coordinates: 48°41′29″N 2°15′51″E
- Country: France
- Region: Île-de-France
- Department: Essonne
- Arrondissement: Palaiseau
- Canton: Longjumeau
- Intercommunality: CA Paris-Saclay

Government
  - Mayor (2020–2026): Stéphane Bazile
- Area^{1}: 7.65 km^{2} (2.95 sq mi)
- Highest elevation: 158 m (518 ft)
- Lowest elevation: 43 m (141 ft)
- Population (2023): 6,733
  - Density: 880/km^{2} (2,280/sq mi)
- Time zone: UTC+01:00 (CET)
  - Summer (DST): UTC+02:00 (CEST)
- INSEE/Postal code: 91587 /91160
- ^{1} French Land Register data, which excludes lakes, ponds, glaciers > 1 km^{2} (0.386 sq mi or 247 acres) and river estuaries.

Saulx-les-Chartreux (French pronunciation: [so le ʃaʁtʁø]) is a commune in the Essonne department in the southern suburbs of Paris, France. It is located 20 kilometres from the center of Paris.

== History ==
The name of the city come from a tree: Saule (willow tree in French). Monks built a monastery in this village during the 11th century, and lived there until the Wars of Religion in 1592, when Condé soldiers came to burn the place.

On 11 July 1973, Varig Flight 820 crashed near the village, just before arriving in Orly airport. 123 people died, and 11 survived.

== Population ==
Inhabitants of Saulx-les-Chartreux are known as Salucéens in French.

Historical population
Year	Pop.	±% p.a.
1968	1,934	—
1975	2,437	+3.36%
1982	3,247	+4.18%
1990	4,141	+3.09%
1999	4,952	+2.01%
2007	4,883	−0.18%
2012	5,128	+0.98%
2017	5,886	+2.80%
2023	6,733	+2.27%
Source: INSEE

== Notable people ==
- Adolphe Adam (musician and composer) lived in Saulx-les-Chartreux

== Places and monuments ==
- Notre Dame de l'Assomption, church built during 11th and 16th centuries
- Forest with specific geologic place

== See also ==
- Communes of the Essonne department
