= La Ville-du-Bois =

Commune in Île-de-France, France

- Commune
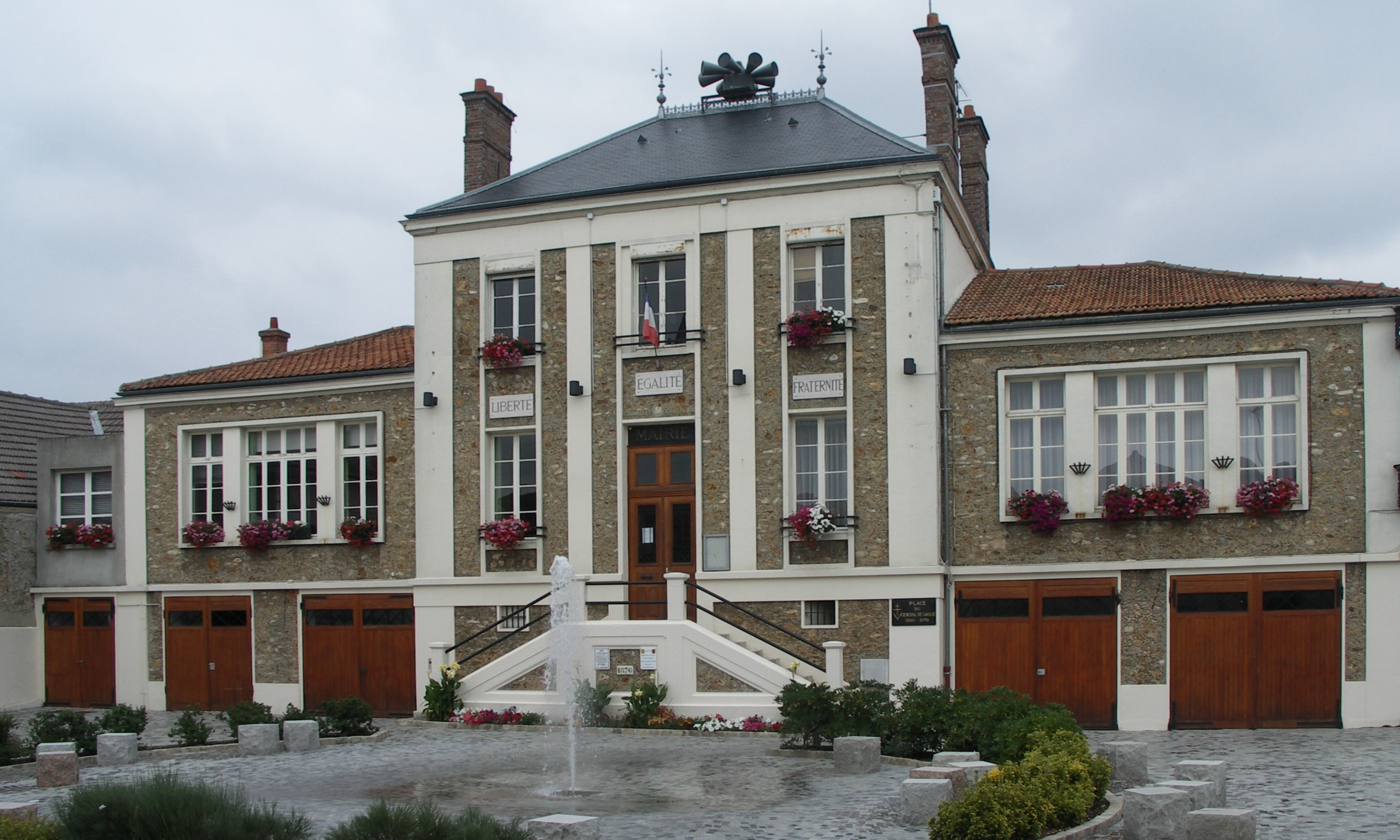
- The town hall in La Ville-du-Bois

- Coat of arms
- Location of La Ville-du-Bois
- Location within France Location within Île-de-France (region)
- Coordinates: 48°39′40″N 2°16′07″E
- Country: France
- Region: Île-de-France
- Department: Essonne
- Arrondissement: Palaiseau
- Canton: Longjumeau
- Intercommunality: CA Paris-Saclay

Government
  - Mayor (2020–2026): Jean-Pierre Meur
- Area^{1}: 8.77 km^{2} (3.39 sq mi)
- Highest elevation: 162 m (531 ft)
- Lowest elevation: 82 m (269 ft)
- Population (2023): 8,161
  - Density: 931/km^{2} (2,410/sq mi)
- Time zone: UTC+01:00 (CET)
  - Summer (DST): UTC+02:00 (CEST)
- INSEE/Postal code: 91665 /91620
- ^{1} French Land Register data, which excludes lakes, ponds, glaciers > 1 km^{2} (0.386 sq mi or 247 acres) and river estuaries.

La Ville-du-Bois (French pronunciation: [la vil dy bwa]) is a commune in the southern suburbs of Paris, France. It is located 23 km (14 mi) from the center of Paris.

== Population ==
Inhabitants of La Ville-du-Bois are known as Urbisylvains in French.

Historical population
Year	Pop.	±% p.a.
1968	2,594	—
1975	3,334	+3.65%
1982	4,067	+2.88%
1990	5,404	+3.62%
1999	5,901	+0.98%
2007	6,833	+1.85%
2012	7,187	+1.02%
2017	7,753	+1.53%
2023	8,161	+0.86%
Source: INSEE

== Notable residents ==
Constantine Andreou, the Greek painter, once lived in La Ville-du-Bois. In 1999, the town's library was named in honor of Andreou.

== See also ==
- Communes of the Essonne department
