= Champlan =

Commune in Île-de-France, France

- Commune
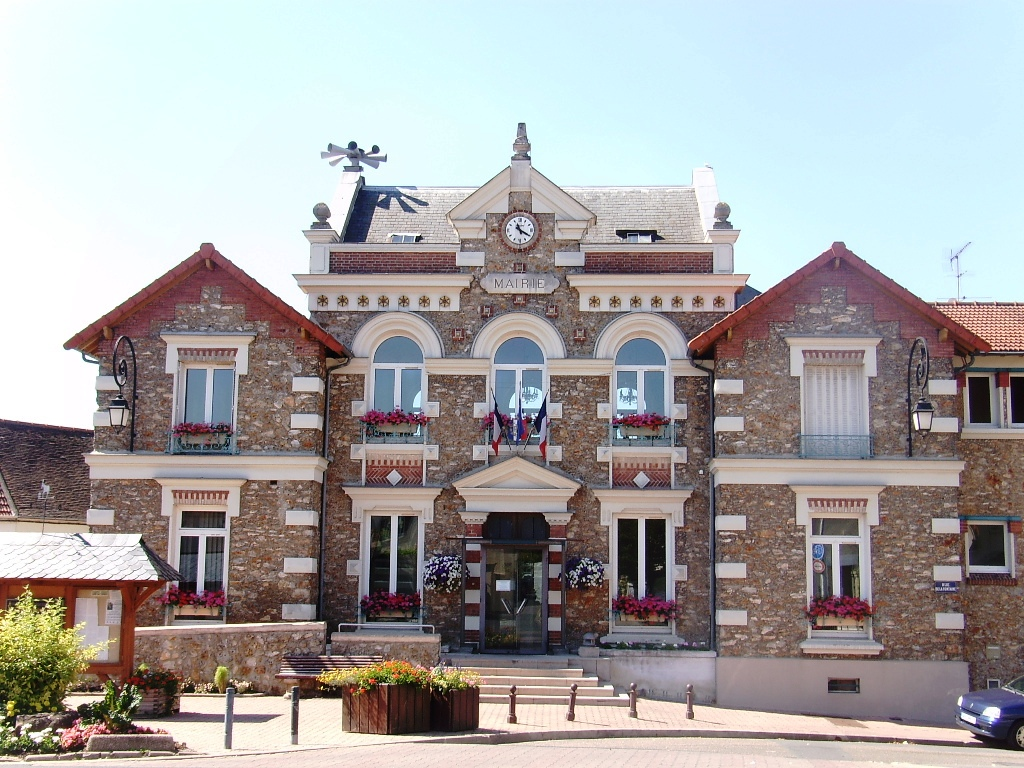
- Town hall

- Coat of arms
- Location of Champlan
- Location within France Location within Île-de-France (region)
- Coordinates: 48°42′30″N 2°16′26″E
- Country: France
- Region: Île-de-France
- Department: Essonne
- Arrondissement: Palaiseau
- Canton: Longjumeau
- Intercommunality: CA Paris-Saclay

Government
  - Mayor (2020–2026): Christian Leclerc
- Area^{1}: 3.68 km^{2} (1.42 sq mi)
- Highest elevation: 125 m (410 ft)
- Lowest elevation: 43 m (141 ft)
- Population (2023): 2,615
  - Density: 711/km^{2} (1,840/sq mi)
- Time zone: UTC+01:00 (CET)
  - Summer (DST): UTC+02:00 (CEST)
- INSEE/Postal code: 91136 /91160
- ^{1} French Land Register data, which excludes lakes, ponds, glaciers > 1 km^{2} (0.386 sq mi or 247 acres) and river estuaries.

Champlan (French pronunciation: [ʃɑ̃plɑ̃]) is a commune located 16 kilometres (10 mi) to the southwest of Paris, in the Essonne department in Île-de-France in northern France.

Although now completely enveloped in the Paris Metropolitan Area, the town has conserved its rural character in spite of its direct proximity to the capital, and thus retains its slogan of "Champlan, the meadow of Paris".

== Population ==
Historical population
Year	Pop.	±% p.a.
1968	1,859	—
1975	2,421	+3.85%
1982	2,446	+0.15%
1990	2,491	+0.23%
1999	2,458	−0.15%
2007	2,444	−0.07%
2012	2,667	+1.76%
2017	2,761	+0.70%
2023	2,615	−0.90%
Source: INSEE

Inhabitants of Champlan are known as Champlanais in French.

== Climate ==
Champlan is located in the Île-de-France, and has a Maritime climate. The annual average temperature is about 11.2 °C (52 °F), with an average maximum temperature of 14.8 °C (59 °F), and a minimum of 7.1 °C (45 °F). The maximum summer temperature (from July to August), averages around 24 °C (75 °F) and the minimum winter temperature (from January to February), averages around 1 °C (34 °F). Its climate is distinguished from that of Paris by a temperature that is on average, 2 degrees Celsius (3.8 degrees Fahrenheit) less, explained by the Urban Heat Island phenomena. The record temperatures were caused by the influence from the continental climate located to the east, reaching a high of 38.2 °C (101 °F) on 1 July 1952, and a low of -15.8 °C (4 °F) on 17 January 1985.

== See also ==
- Communes of the Essonne department
