= Villejust =

Commune in Île-de-France, France

- Commune
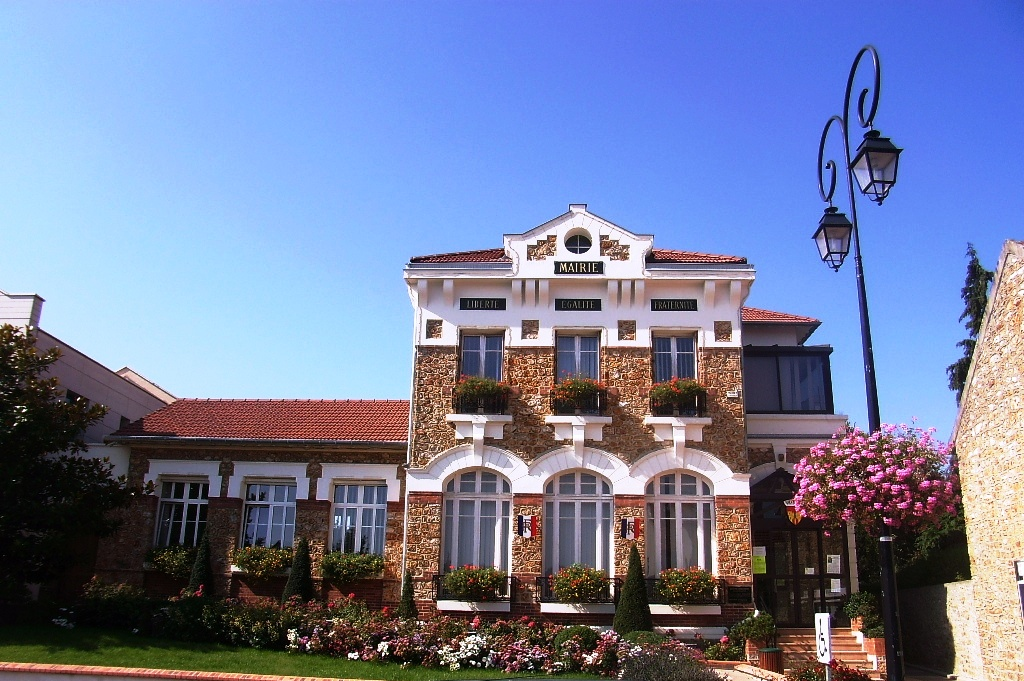
- The town hall in Villejust

- Coat of arms
- Location of Villejust
- Location within France Location within Île-de-France (region)
- Coordinates: 48°40′57″N 2°14′12″E
- Country: France
- Region: Île-de-France
- Department: Essonne
- Arrondissement: Palaiseau
- Canton: Les Ulis
- Intercommunality: CA Paris-Saclay

Government
  - Mayor (2020–2026): Igor Trickovski
- Area^{1}: 5.36 km^{2} (2.07 sq mi)
- Highest elevation: 167 m (548 ft)
- Lowest elevation: 121 m (397 ft)
- Population (2023): 2,558
  - Density: 477/km^{2} (1,240/sq mi)
- Time zone: UTC+01:00 (CET)
  - Summer (DST): UTC+02:00 (CEST)
- INSEE/Postal code: 91666 /91140
- ^{1} French Land Register data, which excludes lakes, ponds, glaciers > 1 km^{2} (0.386 sq mi or 247 acres) and river estuaries.

Villejust (French: [vilʒyst]) is a commune in the Essonne department in Île-de-France in northern France.

== Population ==
Historical population
Year	Pop.	±% p.a.
1968	793	—
1975	889	+1.65%
1982	917	+0.44%
1990	1,324	+4.70%
1999	1,655	+2.51%
2007	2,174	+3.47%
2012	2,268	+0.85%
2017	2,385	+1.01%
2023	2,558	+1.17%
Source: INSEE

Inhabitants of Villejust are known as Villejustiens in French.

== See also ==
- Communes of the Essonne department
