= De Jouvenel =

De Jouvenel is a surname. Notable people with the surname include:

- Bertrand de Jouvenel (1903–1987), French philosopher
- Colette de Jouvenel, (1913–1981), French producer
- Henry de Jouvenel (1876–1935), French journalist

== See also ==
- Master of Jouvenel, anonymous French illuminator
- Guillaume Jouvenel des Ursins (1400–1472), Chancellor of France
