= Julie de Carneilhan =

Julie de Carneilhan may refer to:

- Julie de Carneilhan (novel), a 1941 novel by the French writer Colette
- Julie de Carneilhan (film), a 1950 film adaptation directed by Jacques Manuel
