= Journey to Italy =

1954 film

- Theatrical release poster
- Directed by: Roberto Rossellini
- Written by: Vitaliano Brancati; Roberto Rossellini
- Based on: Duo; 1934 novel by Colette
- Produced by: Adolfo Fossataro; Alfredo Guarini; Roberto Rossellini
- Starring: Ingrid Bergman; George Sanders
- Cinematography: Enzo Serafin
- Edited by: Jolanda Benvenuti
- Music by: Renzo Rossellini
- Production companies: Francinex; Les Films Ariane; Société Générale de Cinématographie
- Distributed by: Titanus Distribuzione
- Release date: 7 September 1954
- Running time: 105 minutes (Italy); 88 minutes (France); 80 minutes (US); 70 minutes (UK)
- Countries: Italy; France
- Languages: English (production); Italian (original release)

Journey to Italy, also known as Voyage to Italy, is a 1954 drama film directed by Roberto Rossellini. Ingrid Bergman and George Sanders play a married English couple on a trip to Italy, during which they spend some time apart and evaluate the strength of their bond.

The film was written by Rossellini and Vitaliano Brancati, inspired somewhat by the 1934 novel Duo by Colette. Although the film was an Italian production, the dialogue is in English. Its first theatrical release occurred in Italy under the title Viaggio in Italia, with the dialogue dubbed into Italian.

Despite being a critical failure on release, later appraisal of the film has been much more positive. In 2012, it was listed by Sight & Sound magazine as one of the fifty greatest films ever made.

== Plot ==
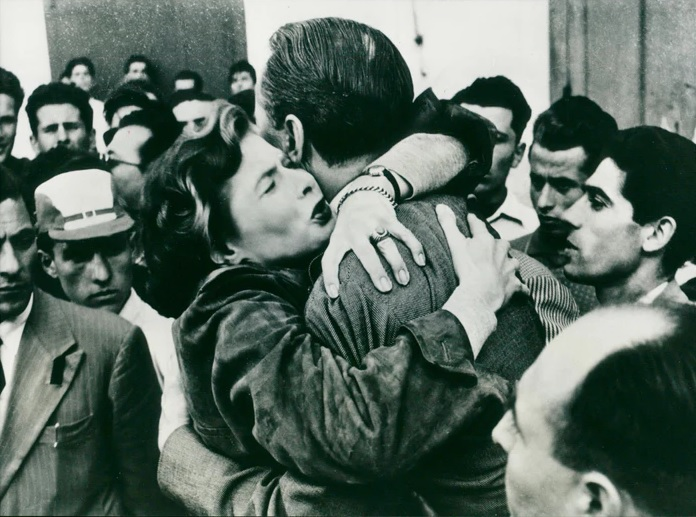
Ingrid Bergman and George Sanders in Journey to Italy

Alex and Katherine Joyce are a couple from England who have traveled by car to Italy to sell a villa near Naples that they have recently inherited from Alex's deceased uncle Homer. The trip is intended as a vacation for Alex, a workaholic businessman given to brusqueness and sarcasm. Katherine is more sensitive, and the journey has evoked poignant memories of a deceased poet friend.

Conversing as they drive through the Italian countryside, Alex and Katherine arrive in Naples and run into Judy, an old friend, and her party. They join and have drinks and dinner. The next day they are given a lengthy room-by-room tour of Homer's villa by its caretakers, Tony Burton, a former British soldier, and Natalia Burton, the Italian wife Tony married after the war.

Within days of their arrival, the couple's relationship becomes strained amid mutual misunderstandings. Katherine goes into Naples where she observes magnificent ancient statues, which she is excited to tell Alex about, producing a modicum of interest. However, as buried anger and jealousy take hold, the two begin to spend their days apart. Alex leaves a note announcing his departure for a pleasure trip to the island of Capri. There, he pursues women who have no profound interest in him, one a lonely wife awaiting the return of her husband, and another a prostitute.

Katherine explores morose oddities such as an active volcano, catacombs, and a cemetery of disinterred human skulls. On the last day, the couple has an explosive argument and impetuously agree to divorce. They are interrupted by Tony, who insists that they go with him to Pompeii for an extraordinary opportunity. There, the three witness the discovery of two bodies that had been buried in ashes during the eruption of Mount Vesuvius nearly 2,000 years earlier, disturbing Katherine. On their return to Naples, they are unable to proceed due to a large religious procession. Katherine is swept away in the crowd, and Alex goes after her. With the scene paralleling the state of their relationship, the couple embraces in reconciliation.

== Cast ==
- Ingrid Bergman as Katherine Joyce.
- George Sanders as Alexander 'Alex' Joyce (credited as Georges Sanders).
- Maria Mauban as Marie (credited as Marie Mauban).
- Anna Proclemer as a prostitute.
- Paul Muller as Paul Dupont.
- Leslie Daniels as Tony Burton (billed as Anthony La Penna). Burton is an Englishman living in Italy and married to Natalie. The Burtons are acting as caretakers for Uncle Homer's villa.
- Natalia Ray as Natalie Burton (credited as Natalia Rai). Natalie is an Italian woman married to Tony.
- Jackie Frost as Betty.

== Production ==
The film originally was intended as an adaptation of the French writer Colette's novel Duo; Rossellini was, however, unable to get the rights to the novel and so was forced to draft a screenplay that differed sufficiently from the novel. Rossellini and his co-author, Vitaliano Brancati, also apparently drew on a script entitled New Vine, by Antonio Pietrangeli, which described the argumentative relationship of an English couple touring Naples in a Jaguar automobile. The film's storyline about Charles Lewington, the deceased poet who had been in love with Katherine Joyce, is considered to be an allusion to the short story "The Dead" by James Joyce.

Rossellini's directorial style was very unusual. The actors did not receive their lines until shortly before filming of a particular scene, which left them little if any chance to prepare or rehearse. George Sanders' autobiography Memoirs of a Professional Cad (1960) tellingly describes Rossellini's methods of direction and their effects on the actors and production team.

Filming locations of tourist sites in Italy include Naples National Archaeological Museum, the Phlegraean Fields, the Fontanelle cemetery, and excavations at Pompei. The procession in Naples was for Saint Gennaro.

== Theatrical releases ==
The film was completed in 1953, but it took 18 months to arrange for distribution of the film in Italy. It was released in 1954 with the title Viaggio in Italia, with a running time of 105 minutes. The receipts and critical reception were poor. The film had been dubbed into Italian, and now is used as an example of "monstrous" difficulties with dubbing. In April 1955, an 88-minute version of the film, in English, was released in France as L'Amour est le plus fort. There was little interest in the film in the U.S. and Britain despite the fact that the film had been made in English with noted actors in the leads. An American version, with an 80-minute running time, had a limited release in 1955 with the title Strangers. In Britain, a cut version (70 minutes) was released in 1958 under the title The Lonely Woman.

== Reception and significance ==
Journey to Italy performed badly at the box office and was largely a critical failure at the time of release. It had a profound influence, however, on New Wave filmmakers working in the 1950s and 1960s. As described six decades later by film critic John Patterson: "French critics at the Cahiers du Cinéma – the likes of Jean-Luc Godard, Jacques Rivette, François Truffaut and Claude Chabrol – all saw it as the moment when poetic cinema grew up and became indisputably modern. Journey to Italy is thus one wellspring of the French New Wave. A film convulsed by themes of sterility, petrification, pregnancy and eternity, it finds its echo in such death-haunted Nouvelle Vague masterpieces as Chabrol's Le Boucher and Truffaut's La Chambre Verte." Filmmaker Martin Scorsese talks about the film and his impressions of it in his own film My Voyage to Italy (1999).

Today, Journey to Italy generally is regarded as a landmark film. Critic Geoff Andrew referred to it as "a key stepping stone on the path to modern cinema" in its shift away from neorealism, and A. O. Scott notes Rossellini's "way of dissolving narrative into atmosphere, of locating drama in the unspoken inner lives of his characters"; because Alex and Katherine are not developed through a conventional plot but instead spend lengthy amounts of time in boredom and dejection, the film frequently is cited as a major influence on the dramas of Michelangelo Antonioni and later works about modern malaise. The film is ranked 41st in the 2012 survey of film critics conducted by Sight & Sound magazine, under the auspices of the British Film Institute. It was ranked 72nd in the 2022 poll, tying with Imitation of Life (1959), Antonioni's L'Avventura (1960), and My Neighbor Totoro (1988). On the website They Shoot Pictures Don't They, which aggregates film polls to determine the most acclaimed films of all time, the film is ranked in 69th place. On Rotten Tomatoes, the average score from 26 critics is 8.6 out of 10 with an approval rating of 96%. On Metacritic, based on an average of 4 reviews from critics, the film received a perfect score of 100, meaning "universal acclaim".

The Japanese filmmaker Akira Kurosawa cited this movie as one of his 100 favorite films. Some consider it to be Rossellini's best film.

== Home media and restoration ==
There have been several releases of Journey to Italy for home video. In 2013, the Criterion Collection released a newly restored version as a region 1 DVD. This version is based on restoration work at Cineteca di Bologna and Cinecittà Luce, which was reviewed very favorably by Glenn Erickson. An earlier DVD version was released in 2003 as a region 2 DVD by the British Film Institute. It was reviewed then by Gary Tooze. A VHS tape version was released in 1992.
