= Break of Day =

1928 book by Sidonie-Gabrielle Colette

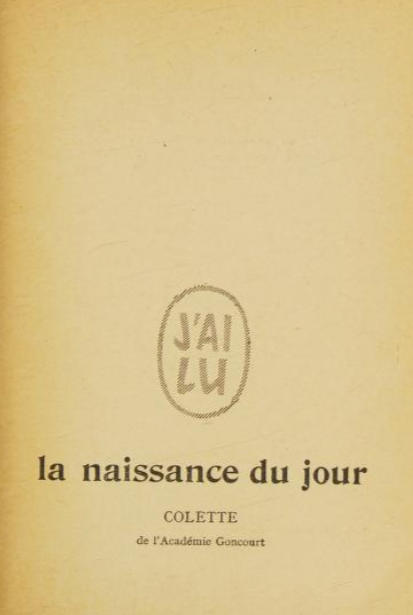
- Title page for La Naissance du jour (1928)
- Author: Colette
- Original title: La Naissance du jour
- Translator: Enid McLeod
- Language: French
- Publisher: Flammarion
- Publication date: 1928
- Publication place: France
- English publication date: 1961
- Pages: 245

Break of Day (French: La Naissance du jour) is a 1928 novel by the French writer Colette. It was adapted into a 1980 film directed by Jacques Demy.

== Reception ==
Elaine Marks reviewed the book for The New York Times in 1961: "It may well be that, for some, Colette's Break of Day will appear to be a slightly precious treatise on the themes of nature and love. For others, it may well be a source of strength, a poetic, that is to say a rhythmical, response to the difficulties of growing old and dying, written by a woman who grew old and who died with comparable dignity and grace."

== Bibliography ==
- Title: Break of Day
- Author Colette
- Editor: Farrar, Straus and Giroux, 1961
- Pages Nº: 143 p.

== See also ==
- 1928 in literature
- 20th-century French literature
