= Julie de Carneilhan (novel) =

1941 novel by Colette

- Author: Colette
- Language: French
- Genre: Drama
- Publication date: 1941
- Publication place: France
- Media type: Print

Julie de Carneilhan is a 1941 novel by the French writer Colette.

== Film adaptation ==
In 1950 it was adapted into a film of the same title directed by Jacques Manuel and starring Edwige Feuillère.

== Bibliography ==
- Goble, Alan. The Complete Index to Literary Sources in Film. Walter de Gruyter, 1999.
