= The Vagabond (novel) =

1910 novel by Colette

- Author: Colette Willy
- Original title: La Vagabonde
- Translator: Charlotte Remfry-Kidd, Enid McLeod
- Language: French
- Publisher: P. Ollendorff
- Publication date: 1910
- Publication place: France
- English publication date: 1912, 1931, 1955
- Pages: 310

The Vagabond (French: La Vagabonde) is a 1910 novel by the French writer Colette Willy. It tells the story of divorced woman Renée Néré, who becomes a dancer in music halls in order to support herself. It was inspired by Colette's experiences after her own separation from Henry Gauthier-Villars in 1906 and subsequent divorce in 1910.

== Synopsis ==
Renée Néré is introduced in her music-hall dressing room anxiously preparing for a performance. It is revealed that Renée and her husband have divorced after eight years of her husband’s faithlessness and cruelty, and that Renée has been struggling to support herself as a music-hall performer for the past three years. She checks her make-up in the mirror, then goes to perform, confident and controlled.

Renée’s life as an artist is described: her work as a dancer, her casual relations with her fellow performers, the small apartment that she shares with her maid, Blandine and her dog Fossette, and her introduction to Maxime Dufferein-Chautel. Maxime presents himself at her dressing-room door one evening, and Renée dismisses him as an awkward intruder, charming and respectful as he seems to be. She more formally meets him again after a private engagement arranged by his brother. Night after night, Renée’s admirer watches her from the front row and patiently waits for her.

With her old friend Hamond acting as a go-between, Renée and Maxime become slowly closer. Maxime visits her; and Renée acknowledges that she has an admirer, but nothing more. Eventually, their acquaintance deepens, but not into intimacy, despite Maxime’s desires otherwise. This continues until Renée signs a contract for a six-week tour with Brague, her mentor, and his pupil. Now she must decide between Maxime and her career, as she recognizes that she cannot allow him to accompany her and is not yet ready to give up the wandering life, which somehow suits her. She then lies, promising to give herself to Maxime, but not until the tour is over. Renée leaves Paris, full of both hope and regret.

Renée travels from place to place, writing letters to Maxime which make up the narrative. These letters are sprinkled with accounts of performances, and thoughts about her relationship with him. The book ends with her final letter to him and the thoughts that she directs toward him as she leaves the letter are unfinished.

== Reception ==
Frances Keene called The Vagabond an "enchanting, sincere and beautifully constructed novel" in a 1955 review for The New York Times. Keene complimented the book's English translation, but wrote: "It is a pity that its title has had to be transliterated. What 'La Vagabonde' means, of course, is 'The Wanderer,' as Renee Nere points out when considering second marriage: 'I shall have everything ... and I shall lean over the edge of a white terrace smothered with the roses of my gardens and shall see the lords of the earth, the wanderers, pass by!'" Keene ended the review: "Colette has the natural sober tone, the importance attached to feelings, the graceful brevity which Maurois once said 'define one of the forms of the French novel.' But above all her occasional hoarse cry of loss voices the complex anguish of our time."

In 2011, James Hopkin wrote about The Vagabond for The Guardian: "Has the novel dated in the course of a century? Not at all. There's enough energy and inventiveness here to blow away any dusty hints of antiquarian charm. And for years I've been telling people that no one writes about relationships as perceptively as Colette."

In light of its recurring focus on the world of performance and the experience of performers, William McEvoy has discussed The Vagabond as theatre-fiction.

== See also ==
- 1910 in literature
- 20th-century French literature
