= Zeev Sternhell =

Israeli historian (1935–2020)

- זאב שטרנהל
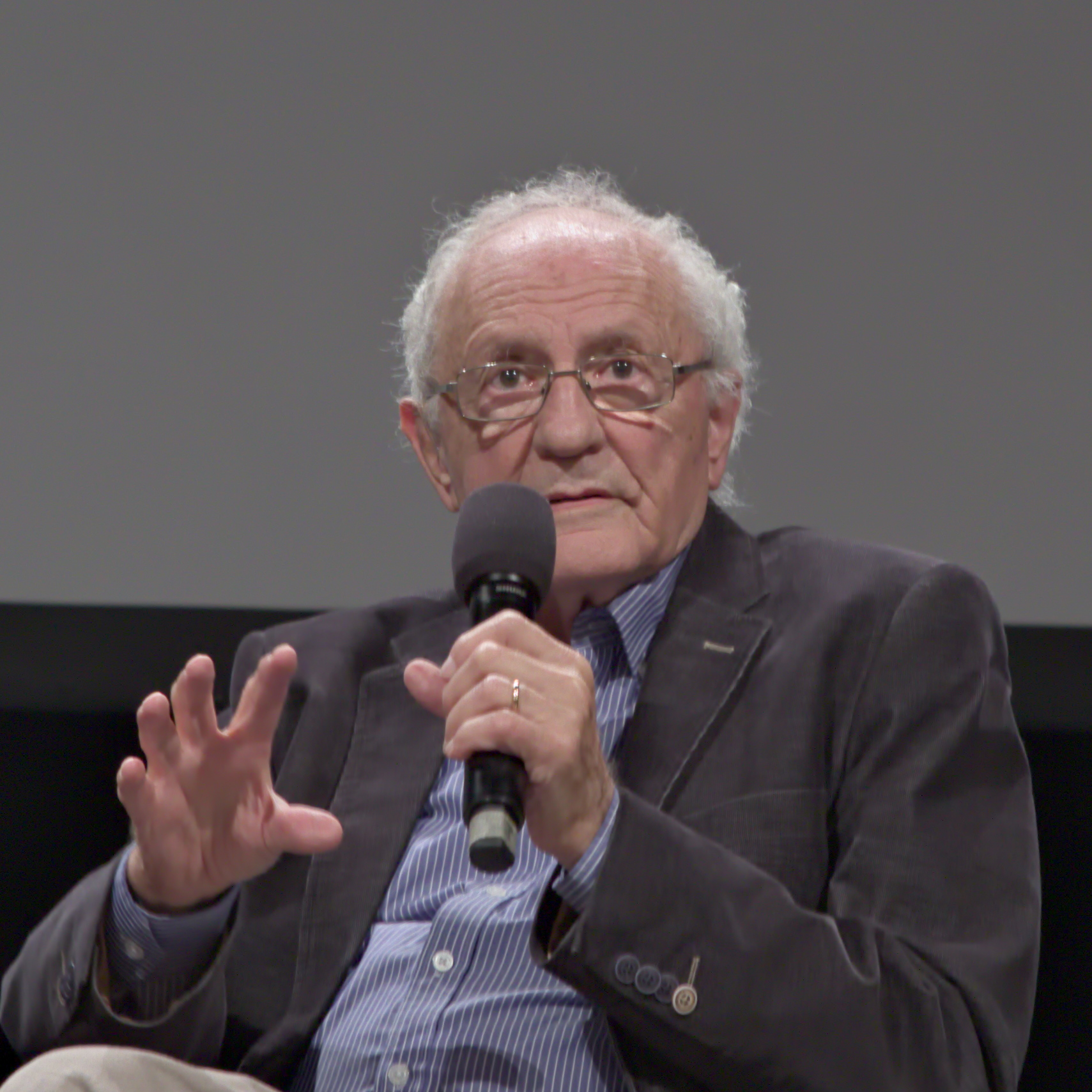
- Born: 10 April 1935; Przemyśl, Poland
- Died: 21 June 2020 (aged 85); Jerusalem
- Education: Hebrew University of Jerusalem; Paris Institute of Political Studies
- Occupations: Historian, writer
- Known for: Research on the roots of fascism
- Spouse: Ziva Sternhell
- Children: 2 daughters
- Awards: Israel Prize, 2008

Zeev Sternhell (Hebrew: זאב שטרנהל; 10 April 1935 – 21 June 2020) was a Polish-born Israeli historian, political scientist, commentator on the Israeli–Palestinian conflict, and writer. He was one of the world's leading theorists of the phenomenon of fascism. Sternhell headed the Department of Political Science at the Hebrew University of Jerusalem and wrote for Haaretz newspaper.

== Biography ==
Zeev Sternhell was born in Przemyśl in south-eastern Poland on 10 April 1935 to an affluent secular Jewish family with Zionist tendencies. His grandfather and father were textile merchants. At 5, this highly protected world around him suddenly collapsed. His father fought with the Polish army during the invasion of Poland in September 1939, and died shortly after returning home. When Poland was defeated, the family home was partially requisitioned by Soviet forces. After the German declaration of war on the Soviet Union, the family were sent to a ghetto. His mother and older sister, Ada, were killed by the Nazis when he was about seven years old. An uncle who had a permit to work outside the ghetto smuggled him to Lwów. The uncle found a Polish officer and a working-class family, rare examples in his experience of Poland at that time of people not only not anti-Semitic but ready to provide assistance to Jews, who were willing to help them. Supplied with false Aryan papers, Sternhell lived with his aunt, uncle and cousin as a Polish Catholic. After the war, he was baptized, taking the Polish name Zbigniew Orolski. He became an altar boy in the Cathedral of Kraków. In 1946, at the age of 11, Sternhell was taken to France on a Red Cross children's train, where he lived with an aunt. He learned French and was accepted to a school in Avignon despite stiff competition.

In the winter of 1951, at the age of 16, Sternhell immigrated to Israel under the auspices of Youth Aliyah, and was sent to Magdiel boarding school. In the 1950s, he served as a platoon commander in the Golani infantry brigade, including the Sinai War. He fought as a reservist in the Six-Day War, the Yom Kippur War and the 1982 Lebanon War. and defined himself in 2008 as still a 'super-Zionist'.

In 1957–1960, he studied history and political science at the Hebrew University of Jerusalem, graduating with a BA cum laude. In 1969, he was awarded a Ph.D. from the Institut d'études politiques de Paris for his thesis on "The Social and Political Ideas of Maurice Barrès".

Sternhell lived in Jerusalem with his wife Ziva, an art historian, with whom he had two daughters. He died on 21 June 2020, due to complications from a medical surgery.

== Academic career ==
In 1976, Sternhell became co-editor of The Jerusalem Quarterly, remaining an active contributor until 1990. He started teaching political science at the Hebrew University in 1966, becoming a full professor in 1982. In 1989, he was elected to the Léon Blum Chair of Political Science at the Hebrew University and became a member of the editorial board of History and Memory. In 1991, the French government awarded him the title of "Chevalier de l'Ordre des Arts et des Lettres" for his outstanding contribution to French culture. In 1996, he was a member of the editorial board of the Journal of Political Ideologies.

== Awards and recognition ==
In 2008, Sternhell was awarded the Israel Prize, for Political Science. Although the Supreme Court of Israel was petitioned to have him denied the award (see "Controversies" below), the court determined not to intervene in a matter beyond its jurisdiction.

== Research ==
Zeev Sternhell considered fascism, in its ideological form, to be a synthesis of anti-materialist socialism and nationalism. He traced its roots to ideas that emerged in the Counter-Enlightenment in reaction to the historical turning point of 1789, when the French Revolution destroyed the Ancien Régime. He identified various strains in this reactionary movement, linking them to the three traditional right-wing families cited by René Rémond – legitimism, Orleanism, and Bonapartism together with anarchic/leftist labour movements. The main cultural influences, according to Sternhell were:

- The populist reaction to Boulangisme, a movement led by Georges Boulanger who almost succeeded in his attempt at a coup d'état in 1889;
- Georges Sorel's variety of revolutionary syndicalism, which had a notable impact on currents among Italian anarcho-syndicalists.
- The synthesis of ideas crystallised by the publications of the Cercle Proudhon around the years 1910–1912.

The First World War provided the key circumstances that would prove favourable for transforming these French ideological trends - fascist ideology essentially had been incubated in France, he argued, in the milieu of the 1880s - into a political force in Italy in the aftermath of war. Historians challenge his view that the key ingredients of fascism were formed in that early period, in France. The essential synthesis was a consequence of World War I, and not specifically French.

His research has sparked criticism, in particular from French scholars who argue that the Vichy regime (1940–1944) was of a more traditional conservative persuasion, although belonging to the far-right, than it was counter-revolutionary, counter-revolutionary ideas being a main characteristic of fascism. René Rémond has questioned Sternhell's attribution of Boulangism to the revolutionary right-wing movements. Some scholars say that Sternhell's thesis may shed important light on intellectual influences of fascism, but fascism in itself was not born of a sole ideology and its sociological make-up and popularity among the working classes must also be taken into account.

Stanley G. Payne, for example, remarks in A History of Fascism that "Zeev Sternhell has conclusively demonstrated that nearly all the ideas found in fascism first appeared in France," though it first developed as a political movement in Italy.

Sternhell's identification of Spiritualism with fascism has also given rise to debate, in particular his claim that Emmanuel Mounier's personalism movement "shared ideas and political reflexes with Fascism". Sternhell has argued that Mounier's "revolt against individualism and materialism" would have led him to share the ideology of fascism.

== Political views ==
Sternhell is widely viewed as assuming the mantle worn by predecessors such as Jacob Talmon, Yehoshua Arieli and Yeshayahu Leibowitz as an academic 'keeper at the gate' always prepared to tell the establishment what they are unwilling to see. Sternhell was a long-time supporter of the Israeli peace camp and had written critically in the Israeli press about the Israeli policy toward the Palestinians.

He described himself as liberal. Regarding Zionism, Sternhell said in an interview with Haaretz:

I am not only a Zionist, I am a super-Zionist. For me, Zionism was and remains the right of the Jews to control their fate and their future. I consider the right of human beings to be their own masters a natural right. A right of which the Jews were deprived by history and which Zionism restored to them. That is its deep meaning. And as such, it is indeed a tremendous revolution that touches the lives of each of us. I felt that revolution when I immigrated to Israel alone at the age of 16. Only then, when I disembarked at Haifa from the ship Artza, did I stop being an object of others' action and became a subject. Only then did I become a person who is in control of himself and not dependent on others.

In The Founding Myths of Israel (published in Hebrew in 1995), Sternhell said the main moral justification the Zionists gave for the founding of Israel in 1948 was the Jews' historical right to the land. In the epilogue, he writes:

In fact, from the beginning, a sense of urgency gave the first Zionists the profound conviction that the task of reconquering the country had a solid moral basis. The argument of the Jews' historical right to the land was merely a matter of politics and propaganda. In view of the catastrophic situation of the Jews at the beginning of the century, the use of this argument was justified in every way, and it is all the more legitimate because of the threat of death hanging over the Jews. Historical rights were invoked to serve the need of finding a refuge.

Sternhell argued that after the Six-Day War in 1967, the threat to the Jews had disappeared, which changed the moral basis for retaining conquests:

No leader was capable of saying that the conquest of the West Bank lacked the moral basis of the first half of the twentieth century, namely the circumstances of distress on which Israel was founded. A much-persecuted people needed and deserved not only a shelter, but also a state of its own. [...] Whereas the conquests of 1949 were an essential condition for the founding of Israel, the attempt to retain the conquests of 1967 had a strong flavor of imperial expansion.

Sternhell saw Jewish settlement on the West Bank as a wish of religious Zionism and part of labour Zionism, that the more moderate part of labour Zionism was unable to withstand because this wish was in line with deep Zionist convictions. He saw settlements on the West Bank as a danger to "Israel's ability to develop as a free and open society", because they put nationalistic aims over social and liberal aims.

He said something fundamental changed with the Oslo agreements: "In the history of Zionism the Oslo agreements constitute a turning point, a true revolution. For the first time in its history, the Jewish national movement recognized the equal rights of the Palestinian people to freedom and independence." He ends the epilogue with: "The only uncertain factor today is the moral and political price Israeli society will have to pay to overcome the resistance that the hard core of the settlers is bound to show to any just and reasonable solution."

In a 2014 interview, Sternhell claimed indicators of fascism exist in Israel.

== Controversies ==
=== Defamation trial ===
Sternhell was taken to court by Bertrand de Jouvenel, in 1983, after Sternhell in his work Neither Right nor Left (Ni droite, ni gauche) described him as having been a fascist in the 1930s. Jouvenel—on whose behalf Raymond Aron testified, the only anti-totalitarian intellectual to defend his past—sued him on nine counts of defamation. The judge, finding Sternhell liable on two counts, made him make amends with a fine that was more symbolic than punitive, and took care to allow Sternhell to retain the offending passages in future editions of his book, which Robert Wohl states was a 'major defeat' for the plaintiff.

=== Settler movement ===
Sternhell was threatened on several occasions for his anti-settlement views, including an attempted bombing foiled by police. Haaretz correspondent Nadav Shragai wrote that Sternhell angered Israel's right-wing extremists because some of his statements "justified the murder of settlers by terrorists and tried to foment civil war." For instance, in a 2001 Hebrew op-ed piece, Sternhell wrote: "Many in Israel, perhaps even the majority of the voters, do not doubt the legitimacy of the armed resistance in the territories themselves. The Palestinians would be wise to concentrate their struggle against the settlements, avoid harming women and children and strictly refrain from firing on Gilo, Nahal Oz or Sderot; it would also be smart to stop planting bombs to the west of the Green Line. By adopting such an approach, the Palestinians would be sketching the profile of a solution that is the only inevitable one: The amended Green Line will be an international border and territory will be handed over to compensate the Palestinians for land that has already been or will be annexed to Israel." He similarly wrote in Davar in 1988 that "Only those who are prepared to take Ofra with tanks can stop the fascist erosion threatening to drown Israel's democracy."

== Pipe bomb attack ==
On 25 September 2008, Sternhell was the victim of a pipe bomb attack at his home, and was injured in the leg and hospitalized. Jerusalem police, who found fliers offering more than 1 million shekels (approximately $300,000) to anyone who kills members of Peace Now at the scene, suspected that he was attacked by right-wing settler extremists for his views. From his hospital bed, Sternhell said that "the very occurrence of the incident goes to illustrate the fragility of Israeli democracy, and the urgent need to defend it with determination and resolve."

"On the personal level", he continued, "if the intent was to terrorize, it has to be very clear that I am not easily intimidated; but the perpetrators tried to hurt not only me, but each and every one of my family members who could have opened the door, and for that there is no absolution and no forgiveness." After his release from the hospital, he said he would continue to voice his opinions. French Foreign Minister Bernard Kouchner condemned the attack, saying "The assault on Professor Sternhell is an assault on values of peace and brotherhood that served as an inspiration to Israel's founding fathers." When the investigation was launched, right-wing settler groups made claims that the bombing had been carried out by agents provocateurs.

In October 2009, Israel police arrested Jack Teitel, a Florida-born Jewish extremist, for the attack on Sternhell. Israel police revealed that Teitel, who apparently acted alone, also admitted to a string of other terrorist attacks and attempted attacks, including murdering a Palestinian taxi driver and a West Bank shepherd in 1997 and an attack on the home of a Messianic Jew in the settlement of Ariel in 2008.

== Selected bibliography ==
- Laqueur, Walter, ed. (1976). "Fascist Ideology". Fascism, A Reader's Guide, Analyses, Interpretations, Bibliography. Berkeley: University of California Press. pp. 315–376.
- Ni droite ni gauche. L'idéologie fasciste en France. Paris: Éditions du Seuil. 1983. Translation: Neither Right nor Left: Fascist Ideology in France. Princeton Univ. Press. 1995. ISBN 0-691-00629-6.
- The Birth of Fascist Ideology, with Mario Sznajder and Maia Asheri, published by Princeton University Press, 1989, 1994 (ISBN 0-691-03289-0) (ISBN 0-691-04486-4)
- The Founding Myths of Israel: Nationalism, Socialism, and the Making of the Jewish State Princeton Univ. Press, 1999 (ISBN 0-691-00967-8; e-book ISBN 1-4008-0770-0) (abstract)
- Maurice Barrès et le nationalisme français ("Maurice Barrès and French nationalism") – Bruxelles : Editions Complexe, 1985; originally published by A. Colin, 1972.
- La droite révolutionnaire, 1885–1914. Les origines françaises du fascisme, Paris: Seuil, 1978 and Paris: Gallimard, « Folio Histoire », 1998.
- Sternhell, Zeev (1971). "Paul Déroulède and the origins of modern French nationalism". Journal of Contemporary History. 6 (4): 46–70. doi:10.1177/002200947100600403.
- Malino, Frances; Wasserstein, Bernard, eds. (1985). "The Roots of Popular Anti-Semitism in the Third Republic". The Jews in Modern France. Hanover and London: University Press of New England.
- Tombs, Robert, ed. (1991). "The political culture of nationalism". Nationhood and Nationalism in France, from Boulanger to the Great War, 1889–1918. London: Harper Collins.
- Les anti-Lumières: Une tradition du xvii^{e} siècle à la guerre froide, Paris: Fayard, 2006 and Paris: Gallimard, « Folio Histoire » (édition revue et augmentée), 2010; transl.: The Anti-Enlightenment Tradition. Yale University Press. 2009. ISBN 9780300135541.

== See also ==
- J. Salwyn Schapiro
- List of Israel Prize recipients
