= Duo (novel) =

1934 novel by Colette

- Author: Colette
- Translator: Frederick A. Blossom
- Language: French
- Publisher: Marianne; Ferenczi & fils
- Publication date: 12–31 October 1934
- Publication place: France
- English publication date: 1935
- Pages: 227

Duo is a 1934 novel by the French writer Colette. The story focuses on a married couple on vacation in southern France, who deal with the fact that the wife has been unfaithful. Roberto Rossellini's 1954 film Journey to Italy is loosely based on the novel but is uncredited because the rights were not issued.

== Reception ==
Margaret Wallace of The New York Times wrote: "Duo is a small work and very fine. In comparison with Colette's previous novels it gives one- and this is odd, for nothing she has written has ever seemed shallow or immature- an impression of increased depth and maturity. It is altogether a cleaner and harder piece of writing than one has expected from Colette in the past. It is less mannered, ruthlessly stripped of anything decorative or ornamental, even of wit purely for wit's sake."

== See also ==
- 1934 in literature
- 20th-century French literature
