= Bertrand de Jouvenel =

French politician and futurist (1903–1987)

- Born: 31 October 1903; Paris, France
- Died: 1 March 1987 (aged 83); Paris, France
- Spouse: Marcelle Prat de Jouvenel (m. 1925; died 1971)
- Relatives: Henry (father); Colette (step-mother); Bel-Gazou (half-sister)
- Family: Jouvenel des Ursins

Education
- Education: University of Paris

Philosophical work
- Era: 20th-century philosophy
- Region: Western Philosophy: French philosophy
- School: Conservatism; Liberalism
- Institutions: Mont Pelerin Society
- Main interests: Political philosophy Economics; Futorology
- Notable ideas: High-low vs. middle dynamic

Bertrand de Jouvenel des Ursins (French pronunciation: [bɛʁtʁɑ̃ də ʒuvnɛl dez‿yʁsɛ̃]; 31 October 1903 – 1 March 1987) was a French philosopher, political economist, and futurologist. He taught at the University of Oxford, the University of Cambridge, the University of Manchester, Yale University, the University of Chicago, the University of California, Berkeley and at the Université de Paris 1 Panthéon-Sorbonne.

== Life ==
External videos
- An Interview with Bertrand de Jouvenel

De Jouvenel was the heir of an old family from the French nobility, coming from the Champagne region. He was the son of Henri de Jouvenel and Sarah Boas, the daughter of a Jewish industrialist. Henri divorced Sarah in 1912 to become the second husband of French writer Colette. In 1920, when he was only 16, Bertrand began an affair with his stepmother, who was then in her late 40s. The affair ended Colette and Henri's marriage and caused a scandal. It lasted until 1924. Some believe Bertrand to be the role model for the title character in Colette's novel Chéri, but in fact she had published about half the book, in serial form, before she and her stepson met for the first time, in the spring of 1920. Their affair actually inspired Colette's novel Le Blé en herbe. In the 1930s, he participated in the Cahiers Bleus, the review of Georges Valois' Republican Syndicalist Party. From 1930 to 1934, Jouvenel had an affair with the American war correspondent Martha Gellhorn. They would have married had his wife agreed to a divorce.

In his memoirs, The Invisible Writing, Arthur Koestler recalled that in 1934, de Jouvenel was among a small number of French intellectuals who promised moral and financial support to the newly established Institut pour l'Étude du Fascisme, a supposedly self-financing enterprise. Other personalities to offer support were Professor Langevin, the Joliot–Curies and André Malraux.

However, that same year, de Jouvenel was impressed by the riot of the antiparliamentary leagues that occurred on 6 February 1934, became disillusioned with traditional political parties and left the Radical Party. He began a paper with Pierre Andreu called La Lutte des jeunes (The Struggle of the Young) while at the same time contributing to the right wing paper Gringoire, for which he covered the 1935 Nuremberg Congress in Germany where the infamous Nuremberg Laws were passed. He began frequenting royalist and nationalist circles, where he met Henri de Man and Pierre Drieu la Rochelle.

He was in favour of Franco-German rapprochement and created the "Cercle du grand pavois", which supported the Comité France–Allemagne (Franco-German Committee). Here he became friends with Otto Abetz, the future German ambassador to Paris during the occupation. In February 1936 he interviewed Adolf Hitler for the journal Paris-Midi, for which he was criticised for being too friendly to the dictator.

That same year he joined Jacques Doriot's Parti populaire français (PPF). He became the editor in chief of its journal L'Émancipation nationale (National Emancipation), wherein he supported fascism. He broke with the PPF in 1938 when Doriot supported the Munich Agreement. De Jouvenel's mother passionately supported Czechoslovak independence, and so he began his career as a private secretary to Edvard Beneš, Czechoslovakia's first prime minister.

After the outbreak of World War II, de Jouvenel served briefly in the French army. However, following France's defeat in 1940, he stayed in occupied Paris and published Après la Défaite, in which he called for France to join Hitler's New Order. He later defended his wartime attitudes—which included contacts with German officials and collaborationist circles—as part of a strategy on behalf of French military networks to gather intelligence about Hitler's plans for France. Although this claim was likely true, his private correspondence and writings show that he genuinely wished France would go on to renew its decayed political institutions under a German-led reorganization of Europe.

De Jouvenel became increasingly pessimistic about the occupation, and about state power in general. Beginning in the summer of 1942, he supported the French resistance, fleeing to Switzerland in September 1943 to avoid arrest by German authorities. While in exile, he wrote his magnum opus On Power (published in 1945) and caught the attention of neoliberal academics such as Friedrich Hayek and Wilhelm Röpke, leading him to become a founding member of the Mont Pelerin Society in 1947, alongside Hayek, Röpke, Jacques Rueff, and Milton Friedman.

He was among the very few French intellectuals to pay respectful attention to the economic theory and welfare economics that emerged during the first half of the 20th century in Austria, Italy, the United Kingdom, and the United States. However, he was against government-enforced redistribution in his work The Ethics of Redistribution.

Dennis Hale of Boston College has co-edited two volumes of essays by de Jouvenel.

Later in his life, de Jouvenel's views shifted back to the left. In 1960, he complained to Milton Friedman that the Mont Pelerin Society had "turned increasingly to a Manichaeism according to which the state can do no good and private enterprise can do no wrong." He was sympathetic to the student protests of 1968 and critical of the Vietnam War. He also expressed support for the Socialist François Mitterrand.

=== Sternhell controversy ===
Zeev Sternhell published a book, Ni Droite, ni Gauche ("Neither Right nor Left"), accusing de Jouvenel of having had fascist sympathies in the 1930s and 1940s. De Jouvenel sued in 1983, claiming nine counts of libel, two of which the court upheld. However, Sternhell was neither required to publish a retraction nor to strike any passages from future printings of his book.

== Bibliography ==
- Après la Défaite (After the Defeat), 1941
- On Power: The Natural History of Its Growth, 1948
- The Ethics of Redistribution, 1951
- Bertrand de Jouvenel (1954). "The Treatment of Capitalism by Continental Intellectuals". In Hayek, F.A. (ed.). Capitalism and the Historians. Chicago: The Chicago University Press. pp. 93–123 – via Internet Archive.
- Sovereignty: An Inquiry into the Political Good, 1957
- The Pure Theory of Politics, 1963
- The Art of Conjecture, 1967
