= The Tendrils of the Vine =

1908 book by Sidonie-Gabrielle Colette

- First edition cover
- Author: Colette
- Original title: Les Vrilles de la vigne
- Language: French
- Genre: Short story collection
- Publisher: Éditions de La Vie Parisienne
- Publication date: 1908
- Publication place: France
- Dewey Decimal: 843.912

The Tendrils of the Vine (French: Les Vrilles de la vigne) is a collection of 20 novellas by Colette, published in 1908. The first story, Les Vrilles de la vigne, was first published in Le Mercure musical on 15 May 1905.

It was ranked #59 in Le Monde's 100 Books of the Century.

== Stories ==
The editions currently in print follow Colette's 1934 revisions.

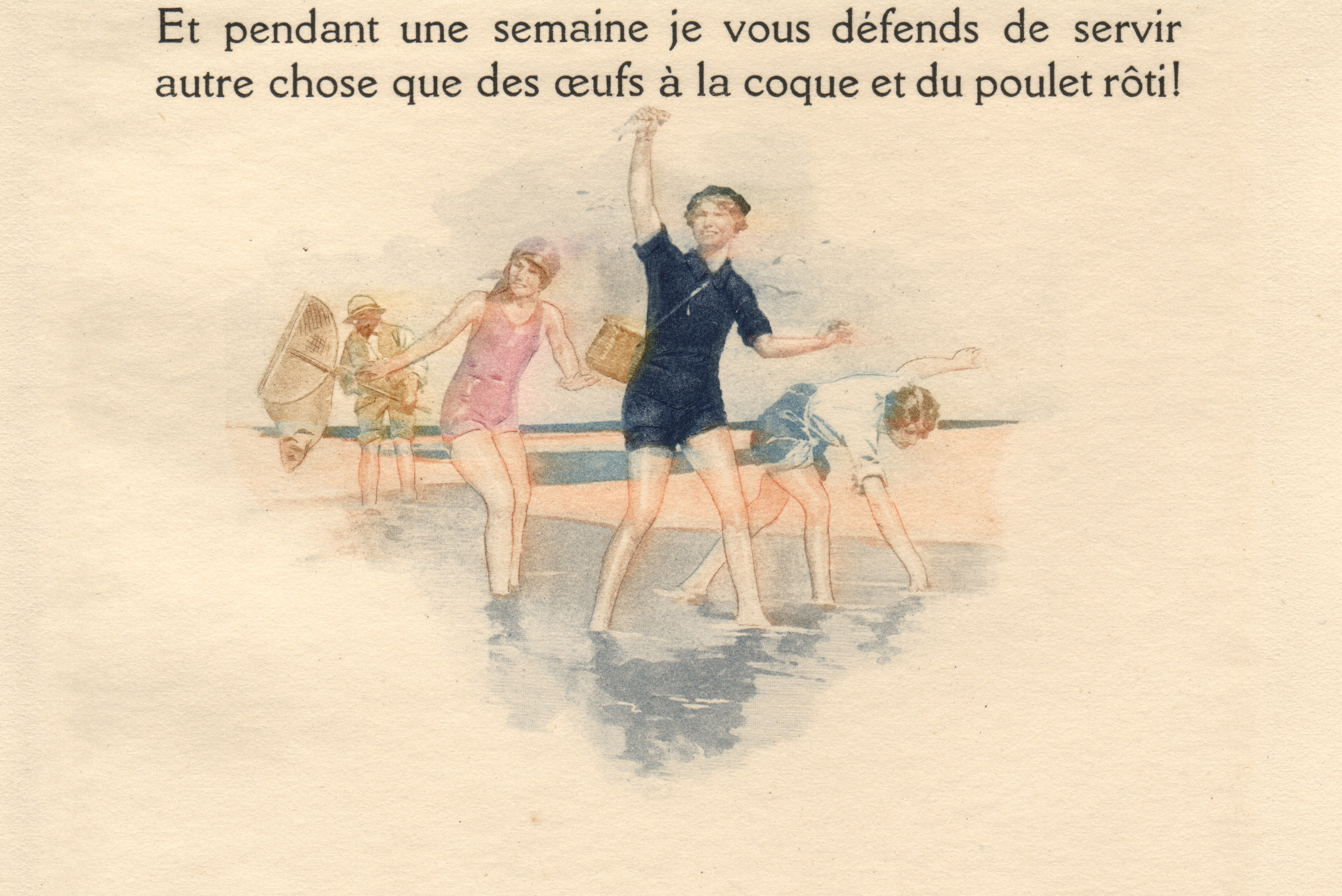
Illustration for the story Partie de pêche (René Lelong, 1930)

- "Les Vrilles de la vigne"
- "Rêverie de nouvel an"
- "Chanson de la danseuse"
- "Nuit blanche"
- "Jour gris"
- "Le Dernier Feu"
- "Amours"
- "Un rêve"
- "Nonoche"
- "Toby-Chien parle"
- "Dialogue de bêtes"
- "Maquillages"
- "Belles-de-jour"
- "De quoi est-ce qu'on a l'air?"
- "La Guérison"
- "Le Miroir"
- "La Dame qui chante"
- "En baies de Somme"
- "Partie de pêche"
- "Music-halls"
