= The Founding Myths of Israel =

1995 book by Zeev Sternhell

The Founding Myths of Israel: Nationalism, Socialism, and the Making of the Jewish State
- Author: Zeev Sternhell
- Publication date: 1995

The Founding Myths of Israel: Nationalism, Socialism, and the Making of the Jewish State is a book by Zeev Sternhell. It was published in Hebrew in 1995, in French in 1996 and in English in 1998. The stated purpose of the book is an analysis of the ideology and actions of labor Zionism in the period before the 1948 Arab-Israeli War. In that period labor Zionism's leaders dominated the institutions of the pre-'48 Palestinian Jewish community. Sternhell's thesis is that the actions and decisions of the leaders of labor Zionism were guided by a nationalist ideology, and not by a socialist ideology. In the "Introduction" and the "Epilogue" Sternhell extrapolates this attitude of the leaders to Israeli politics and argues that nationalist policies have overshadowed social and liberal policies for a long time and are still endangering Israel's ability to develop as a free and open society.

Questions that Sternhell investigates are:

- Was a unique synthesis between socialism and nationalism ever achieved in Palestine?
- Did the founders intend to create an alternative to bourgeois society, or did they renounce the social objective from the beginning as incompatible?
- Was equality a genuine goal, however long-term, or was it only a mobilizing myth?
- Was the nationalism of Labor Zionism and its practical expression, the conquering of the land, in any way special?
- Did it have a universalistic, humanistic and rationalistic basis that distinguished it from the nationalism flourishing in Eastern Europe?
- Did it ever have the potential to overcome the religious substance of Jewish nationalism, and thus establish a liberal, secular and open society, at peace with itself and its neighbours?

Sternhell's answer to the first five questions is "no".

The book has received considerable attention. It was the topic of a conference at the distinguished Van Leer Institute in Jerusalem and the subject of the lead review in the weekly literary supplement of Ha’Aretz newspaper.

== About the author ==
Zeev Sternhell (1935–2020) was an Israeli historian and political theorist, famous for his analysis of the rise of Fascism. He was former head of the Department of Political Science at the Hebrew University of Jerusalem and an occasional columnist for Haaretz newspaper.

== Introduction of the book ==
Sternhell says Labor Zionism's ideology was dominated by nationalism and not by socialism. He introduces the term "nationalist socialism" to describe a variant of socialism of which Labor Zionism was the Jewish version. He writes: "'Constructive socialism' is generally regarded as the labor movement's great social and ideological achievement, a unique and original product, the outstanding expression of the social needs and conditions of the country. But in reality, far from being unique, constructive socialism was merely an Israelite version of nationalist socialism." Socialist roots had been more important in the beginning, but the Marxists became progressively less influential and the followers of Ber Borochov, a Marxist Zionist, disbanded even before the start of the British Mandate. Aaron David Gordon's (1856–1922) teachings dominated the ideology of the Zionist labor movement throughout its existence. His ideas corresponded to the teachings of tribal nationalism in Europe. Zionism defined the Jewish people as a nation and as such was incompatible with ideologies that used other ways of categorising people. Marxism and socialism categorised people in classes, liberalism was based on the idea of man as an autonomous individual. Contrary to Marxism labor Zionism did not engage in a class struggle. It followed rather a strategy of cooperation between workers and capitalists for the benefit of the nation. All had to contribute to the ability of the nation to compete against other nations.

According to Sternhell the main objective of labor Zionism was to conquer as much land as possible. He cites Ben-Gurion, the head of the Histadrut, in December 1922, 'making a declaration of the intentions to which he adhered throughout the rest of his life':

[...] The possibility of conquering the land is liable to slip out of our grasp. Our central problem is immigration ... and not adapting our lives to this or that doctrine. [...] We are conquerors of the land facing an iron wall, and we have to break through it. [...] How can we run our Zionist movement in such a way that [... we] will be able to carry out the conquest of the land by the Jewish worker, and which will find the resources to organise the massive immigration and settlement of workers through their own capabilities? The creation of a new Zionist movement, a Zionist movement of workers, is the first prerequisite for the fulfillment of Zionism. [...] Without [such] a new Zionist movement that is entirely at our disposal, there is no future or hope for our activities

Similarly, Katznelson said in 1927 that the Histadrut existed 'to serve the cause of conquering the land'. Thus the Zionist leadership saw the Ahdut HaAvoda party and the Histadrut as tools to reach their final goal of conquest of the land and creation of a Jewish state. It was primarily interested in effective ways of exercising power. The true nature of labor Zionism was Ben-Gurion's principle of the primacy of the nation and the supremacy of the state over civil society.

After 1922 there was not much discussion about ideology in labor Zionism. According to Sternhell the reason for this was that Ben-Gurion's principle of the primacy of the nation was accepted by the other leaders, and that the leaders didn't want an ideological discussion that might cause conflicts. They wanted the whole labor Zionism movement to work together towards their goal of a Jewish state.

== Chapter 1 - The primacy of the Nation: Aaron David Gordon and the Ethos of Nation-Building ==
According to Sternhell the thought of Aaron David Gordon (1856–1922) was the main inspiration for the ideology of Labor Zionism. The attitudes and policies of the founders and leaders of mainstream Labor Zionism were all in line with his ideas. Gordon was a founder and member of the Hapoel Hatzair party, that fused in 1930 with the Ahdut HaAvoda party into the Mapai party, which included all of mainstream Labor Zionism. Ahdut HaAvoda was established in 1919 by non-party people and the right wing of the Poale Zion-party under the leadership of David Ben-Gurion. Both Hapo'el Hatza'ir and the non-party people were nationalists and anti-Marxists. According to Sternhell right wing Poale Zion had very similar ideas. Sternhel refers to the founders of these parties, who subsequently became the leaders of Labor Zionism, as "the founders". They all came to Palestine during the Second Aliyah (1904–1914).

Gordon's thought can best be typified as "organic nationalism". The nation was seen as a body and this body was more important than its parts, the individuals. Individuals who did not participate in the nation were seen as parasites. As long as the Jewish people was in exile it was seen as parasitic. It lived on and followed the work and creativity of other peoples. Gordon wrote that the Jewish people was "broken and crushed ... sick and diseased in body and soul". He said that this was because "we are a parasitic people. We have no roots in the soil; there is no ground beneath our feet. And we are parasites, not only in an economic sense but in spirit, in thought, in poetry, in literature, and in our virtues, our ideals, our higher human aspirations. Every alien movement sweeps us along, every wind in the world carries us. We in ourselves are almost nonexistent." The principle of the nation's primacy was dominant. The aim of the founders was not to save Jewish individuals, but to save the Jewish nation.

Gordon saw physical labor as the key to solve all problems of the Jewish people. It was the prerequisite for spiritual life, for the reform of Jewish individuals and for the renewal of national existence, and it was the true instrument for conquering the land and restoring it to the Jewish people. Moreover, by working together and abandoning parasitism, the workers would "constitute a body" that would shift power from the sphere of the capitalists to that of the workers and make socialism redundant. In Gordon's opinion socialism was even detrimental, because it split the nation among class lines, it opposed personal and national renewal and it denied the primacy of the nation. Gordon wrote: "we are closer to our own 'bourgois' than to all the foreign proletariats in the world."

Gordon also held that labor gave the Jewish nation a right to the land. He wrote: "Land is acquired by living on it, by work and productivity", and "the land will belong more to the side that is more capable of suffering for it and working it". After World War I he also included historical work and creativity in his claim. In 1921 he wrote:

'For Eretz Israel, we have a charter that has been valid until now and that will always be valid, and that is the Bible [... including the Gospels and the New Testament ...] It all came from us; it was created among us. [...] And what did the Arabs produce in all the years they lived in the country? Such creations, or even the creation of the Bible alone, give us a perpetual right over the land in which we were so creative, especially since the people that came after us did not create such works in this country, or did not create anything at all.'

According to Sternhell 'The founders accepted this point of view. This was the ultimate Zionist argument'.

== Chapter 2 - The Worker as the agent of National Resurrection ==
In a 1955 speech commemorating the fiftieth anniversary of the Second Aliyah Ben-Gurion reviewed the nature and achievements of the labor movement. He considered "the concept of labor as the key idea of the Jewish revival" to be the special contribution of the Second Aliyah to Zionism. The search for a way "to guarantee Jewish labor" led to the birth of communal settlements, and not any theory. According to Sternhell Ben-Gurion believed that the question of workers was not only a social but especially a national question, and that it were the Jewish workers who gave the Yishuv its live and preserved it from destruction and decay. In the speech Ben-Gurion repeatedly stressed that the building of the land had been achieved "without any preconceived theory". He considered this "independence of thought" the greatest virtue of the Second Aliyah.

Sternhell says the people of the Second Aliyah had a sense of chosenness among them. They went to Palestine when only a tiny minority of emigrating Jews went there, they suffered hardships, uncertainty and loneliness in the early years, but they also knew how to build a nation and were convinced that they had the right to dictate the path of those who came after them.

The party mergings in 1919 and 1930 were both shifts to the right. Poale Zion had a right and a left wing. Both Hapo'el Hatza'ir and the non-party people were nationalists and anti-Marxists. In 1919 the Poale Zion party was liquidated because the unification of Jewish workers was impossible with a party adhering to the universalist principles of socialism. The Ahdut HaAvoda party was established. The six founders of the new party included four former nonparty people, Katznelson, Tabenkin, Remez and Yavnieli and two from Poale Zion, of whom Ben-Gurion was close to the other four and only Ben-Zvi still adhered to the socialist principles of Poale Zion. Ahdut HaAvoda was founded officially as a federation instead of a party, because, as Ben-Gurion pointed out, the word party implied fragmentation, and the founders wanted to create a single power structure, which would unite the workers in order to build the nation. Except when general nationalist objectives were concerned the new party avoided to define the nature of its socialism. According to the founders achievements were more important than ideology.

The nationalist Hapo'el Hatza'ir party refused to join the new party because it was still suspicious of socialist sentiments. Therefore, the founders decided to establish the Histadrut, the General Federation of Jewish Workers. After some years of cooperation in the Histadrut Hapoel Hatzair became convinced that there was no socialist threat in Ahdut HaAvoda and in 1930 the two parties joined to form the Mapai party.

== Chapter 3 - Socialism in the Service of the Nation: Berl Katznelson and "Constructive" Socialism ==
Like other nationalist movements Labour Zionism did have a social consciousness, but since the universal principles of socialism and the particularistic ones of nationalism were irreconcilable Labour Zionism made socialism subordinate to nationalism. Berl Katznelson, the intellectual consciousness of Labour Zionism during the Mandate period, made a distinction between "consumer socialism", which focusses on a redistribution of wealth, and "productive socialism", which focusses on producing more wealth for the benefit of the nation, including the workers. According to Sternhell "'for Katznelson a socialist was not somebody who advocated equality or the socialisation of the means of production. A true socialist was someone who worked for immigration and settlement." This kind of socialism was not at odds with capitalism, as far as capital was used towards the same goal, and did not require redistribution of wealth. Instead it required collaboration between the classes towards the national goal. In Katznelson's words: 'Interclass collaboration, necessary for the implementation of Zionism, means mobilizing maximum forces for building up the homeland through labour.' Katznelson rejected every nonproductive brand of socialism, because it would lead to class struggle and "fractionalism".

"Constructive" socialism replaced classic socialism's class struggle between the proletariat and capitalists, by the struggle between producers and parasites. Producers were all those who contributed to the nation: urban workers, small farmers, doctors, engineers and other members of the productive middle class, bourgois whose small factory provided employment and contributed to the nation, etcetera. Parasites were those who did not contribute to the nation, like capitalists who lived of their capital, or even employed Arabs.

== Chapter 4 - Ends and Means: The Labor Ideology and the Histadrut ==
Histadrut membership
year	members	percent of Jewish workforce
1920	4,415	...
1923	8,394	45
1927	22,538	68
1933	35,389	75
1939	100,000	75
1947	176,000	...

The Histadrut was founded in 1920 by Ahdut HaAvoda and Hapo'el Hatza'ir. It was a non-party organisation for all salaried workers in Palestine. The Histadrut provided essential services for its workers. It included a labor exchange, workers' kitchens, a health service and an enterprise for building and construction, which later became the stock company Sollel Boneh. In 1948 the Histadrut controlled 25 percent of the national economy.

The Histadrut was also a trade union, and the founder of the main Yishuv militia, the Haganah. The Histadrut was very powerful, as on the one hand it enjoyed full independence of both the colonial government and the World Zionist Organisation, and on the other hand its members were dependent on it for many essential services.

Ideological affiliation was not a criterion for membership, members were only expected to observe discipline. The Histadrut was not only set up to provide the services to its members and to absorb new immigrants. From the beginning the main aim had been to create the operative arm of a national movement that wanted to create a state. Social change was never an objective. The Histadrut was interested in accumulating wealth, gaining political power and dominating, not changing, the capitalist system. Ben-Gurion, as its head, opposed any desire of the majority to introduce more social aims, as he believed this would destroy the organisational unity of the labor movement.

The internal organisation of the Histadrut was hierarchical. The leadership was very powerful. Discipline and conformity prevailed among the members. Changes in the leadership were very rare. Corruption, administrative failure and unpopularity among the rank and file were generally irrelevant for the position of members of the leadership. Internal disputes and power struggles were.

Ben-Gurion and Katznelson wanted to concentrate as much power as possible in the hands of the Histadrut executive. Two examples of this in the 1920s were the establishment of the Nir company and the liquidation of the Gdud HaAvoda, the Labor Corps. The Nir company became the legal owner of, and ultimate decision maker over all collective settlements, and was controlled by the Histadrut.

The Gdud HaAvoda was established mainly by immigrants from the Third Aliyah (1919–1923). This Aliyah was the last one considered to have a revolutionary potential, as after 1924 the U.S.A. had closed its borders to unlimited immigration, and ideological conviction became only a secondary reason for migration to Palestine. The Gdud sought to be an independent ideological, social and organizational unit. The Gdud aimed at founding a single countrywide commune and a true socialist society. The Histadrut had no interest in this idea. Also, the Gdud's desire to be an independent contractor for public works clashed with Ahdut HaAvoda, which demanded exclusive control. The leaders of Ahdut HaAvoda became even more alarmed when Elkind, the main leader of the Gdud, talked about the "conquest of the Histadrut". The Gdud threatened their power and had to be absorbed or eliminated. Since they did not succeed in the former, they resorted to the latter and declared total war on the Gdud. This war took several years, and ultimately succeeded. In the process Ben-Gurion made use of a ruthless blockade of the Gdud's Tel Yosef kibbutz, including withholding medical aid, food supplies and other necessities.

== Chapter 5 - The Triumph of Nationalist Socialism: "From Class to Nation" ==
With the Fourth Aliyah (1924–1929) many middle class Jews came to Palestine. In this period Ben-Gurion tried to appease the middle classes. He appealed to the labor movement to remove "the double partition" that existed "between ourselves and the people, [...] the class concept that obscures the national character of our movement and gives a false idea of our achievements." Ben-Gurion rejected socialism, calling it "fooling around", and saying: "I see neither left nor right; I only see upward.". While not supporting the socialist concept of "class warfare" the Ahdut HaAvoda leaders did not want to get rid of the term, in order to prevent the Left from claiming sole possession of the socialist heritage. Therefore, they transformed it into a nationalist concept. Class warfare meant that the Jewish workers were organised and struggled for improvement in their working and living conditions and to gain power. It did not antagonise the interests of other classes, but instead it meant that the working class worked for the whole people. The task of class warfare was not to change the bourgois social order, but to set it up in order to dominate it.

Hapo'el Hatza'ir rejected the socialist concept of class warfare, but after the leaders of Ahdut HaAvoda had given it a nationalist meaning the two parties merged into the Mapai party. The slogan accompanying the founding was "from class to nation". Combining this with the "class warfare" slogan the leaders of the new party could enjoy the best of two worlds: they could use socialism as a mobilizing myth and they could work together with the middle classes to build the country.

The labor movement followed a policy of collaboration with the middle classes in order to build the nation and protected the private sector in the Yishuv. After the founding of Mapai, the labor movement became an acceptable party for the capitalists in the World Zionist Organisation, and especially for the left wing of the General Zionists. This cleared the way for the labor movements domination of the WZO in the late 1930s and 1940s.

== Chapter 6 - Democracy and Equality on Trial ==
The internal democracy of the labor movement was very poor. Only about ten percent of the Histadrut members were also party members. The Histadrut bureaucracy manned the Mapai party institutions as well, together with kibbutz members. In this situation there were no really independent supervisory institutions. The middle level of the Histadrut had to supervise its superiors and the higher level had to supervise itself. For their political future the functionaries were mainly dependent on each other, and not on the rank and file of the movement. According to Sternhell, "as long as the leadership was able to close ranks, there was no means of ejecting people from their positions". Freedom of expression was normal, and ideological dissent was allowed, but as soon as either threatened the system the nonconformist was eliminated without mercy. Usually even threatening with this was not necessary though. Mapai had no need to function as a voluntary body. The leaders derived their authority from their control of the Histadrut, which provided essential services for three out of four Jewish employees in Palestine.

Elections were not held, as proscribed, every two years, but from the mid-1920s on rather less frequent. For instance, the Histadrut conventions were held in 1921, 1923, 1927, 1933 and 1942. Elections for other counsels were held similarly infrequent. Executive bodies were set up by appointment committees and were sanctioned by bodies whose members were either workers in the Histadrut or one of its enterprises, or representatives of the collective settlements. Due to the indirect election system, the higher up in the organisation, the less accountable a representative was. Thanks to this system the leadership enjoyed a wide freedom of action.

There was a demand for democracy though. This focussed on more frequent and regular elections and direct election of individual party functionaries. Many people were conscious that Mapai and the Histadrut were only outwardly democratic. For instance, when the Histadrut executive was expanded with 12 members in 1937 Ben-Gurion announced to Mapai's Central Committee: "The committee proposes adding 12 members, and they are [a list follows]. The committee recommends that this will be accepted without alteration and without discussion." In this way an important political decision was made. The Left wing Hashomer Hatza'ir could have tried to do something about it, but it exhibited a similar type of conformism and cult of "natural" leaders. In exchange for a share in budgets for e.g. settlements it was prepared to forget the exact times Histadrut conventions were supposed to be held. Besides, it shared the same long-term goal. The lack of democracy was frustrating for a lot of Histadrut members, for instance at the end of the 1930s a Histadrut employee in Tel Aviv described the attitude of the workers toward the Histadrut as "concealed or open hatred", and ascribed this to their sense of impotence vis-à-vis the leadership.

Corruption was not a reason for one's position to be endangered. For example, Yosef Kitzis, the boss of the Tel Aviv branch of the Histadrut, made personal and political use of his power. Despite a local vote of non-confidence in 1925, Ben-Gurion and Katznelson held him, "the symbol of corruption in public life", in his position for at least ten more years. Similarly, they supported a one-man rule in Haifa, where a regime of "dependency and fear" existed. Similarly, the large "advances" corruption scandal that came to light in 1926 had no consequences at all. In this scandal a large number of Histadrut employees got advances on salaries, which they were not required to repay. The names of the offenders, who included the whole economic leadership of the Histadrut and some members of the executive, were kept secret.

By the 1930s the Histadrut society, apart from the collective settlements, had become an ordinary bourgeois society. Unskilled Jewish workers had to compete with Arab workers, and therefore the gap in wages between unskilled and skilled workers was larger than in most bourgeois societies. There were also large wage differences among the skilled workers of the Histadrut. In 1923 the Histadrut council had approved a "family wage" system. This meant that every employee would get the same basic wage, supplemented by an amount depending on the family size. A committee was set up to implement this. However, since the leadership did not support this committee when Histadrut branches did not implement the family wage, it was impotent. Though it stayed on the agenda for about a decade, and was supported by Histadrut conventions, the "family wage" system was only implemented in the Histadrut branches close to the workers, and even there it was abandoned in the early 1930s. According to Sternhell this could hardly have been different considering the power structure of the Histadrut: the skilled employees had more power than the unskilled, and were not interested in sacrificing part of their salary. The leaders did not support the "family wage" system in practice, but according to Sternhell they did support it in public as a mobilizing myth.

In the late 1930s social and class struggles that raged in bourgeois societies raged also in the Histadrut. Calls for solidarity were expressed in various demands, but none of them was satisfied. Beginning in the 1930s Histadrut members were taxed for an unemployment fund. According to Sternhell the system of taxation could hardly be called progressive. Ordinary members felt the Histadrut's unwillingness to tackle the problem of inequality as a betrayal.

== Epilogue ==
After 1948 there was not much that changed in the distribution of political power and the philosophy and principles that ruled government action. Sternhell says: "in our time Israel is undoubtedly the Western democracy with the weakest means of control in parliament and the strongest executive branch." Mapai stayed in power for another 30 years.

Sternhell does point out the increasing influence of more radical religious Zionism. After the conquest of the West Bank in 1967 religious Zionism and part of labour Zionism wished to have settlements in occupied territory. The more moderate part of labor Zionism was unable to withstand their wish because it was in line with deep Zionist convictions.

== Reviews and criticism ==
In a scholarly review Neil Caplan is very critical: "Sternhell insists on viewing the history of Zionism as an unhappy one determined by wrong-headed 'conscious ideological choices' made by the labour-Zionist elites, and decidedly not 'due to any objective conditions' or to circumstances beyond the movement's control." He does think the book offers some "refreshing comparative perspectives", but spots "a number of problematic tendencies on the author's part". He mentions "overstatements", "sweeping generalizations", "oversimplification", "inappropriate comparisons", "simplistic dichotomies" and "the use of popular buzz-words [...] as value-laden denigrations rather than as neutral descriptive labels".

In another scholarly review Charles D. Smith considers the book "a major contribution to a debate that has raged in Israel for over a decade" and "a brilliant, passionate work that connects past to present in a manner few books can hope to emulate."

Zachary Lockman is critical. He says that, as it was already known that Labor Zionism followed a national course, Sternhell offers little new perspectives. He also says Sternhell ignores that "the evolving discourse and practices of labor Zionism were profoundly shaped by the concrete circumstances in which would-be Jewish workers found themselves in early twentieth-century Palestine and, above all, by the 'Arab question', the inescapable reality that Arabs constituted the great majority of the country's population, dominated its labor market, and owned most of its arable land."

According to Walter Laqueur "His book, while not incorrect inasmuch as the facts are concerned, leads to conclusions that are either obvious and have never been in dispute, or are curiously lopsided." Laqueur says Sternhell's criticism is too harsh: "All this might be regrettable, but how could it be different in the case of a social democratic party in a small country still in the process of being built up?".

While criticising its focus on ideology, according to Nachman Ben-Yehuda "Knowledgeable students of Israel, interested in its political and ideological history, will find Sternhell's book both highly useful and indispensable. While reading the book requires time and patience, it is a rewarding experience. At Israel's fiftieth birthday, ending with a quote from Sternhell's sobering introduction seems highly appropriate: 'Those who wish Israel to be a truly liberal state or Israeli society to be open must recognize the fact that liberalism derives [... from separating] religion from politics. A liberal state can be only a secular state, a state in which the concept of citizenship lies at the center of collective existence' (p. xiii)."

According to Muhammad Ali Khalidi Sternhell's view that the creation of Israel in 1948 was justified by the dire situation of the Jewish people is inconsistent: "Under certain circumstances, persecution may indeed justify the establishment of a state but not on another people's territory and as a result of a military campaign of ethnic cleansing. These actions are simply incompatible with the moral principles that Sternhell finds lacking among Israel's founders: universalism, humanitarianism, egalitarianism, and so on. Sternhell's premises lead to the inexorable conclusion that the guiding ideology of Israel's founders forced an inhumane destiny on the Palestinian people, no less so in 1948 than in 1967. But rather than embrace this obvious conclusion, Sternhell shrinks from it in much the way that other Israeli "post-Zionists" have done."

According to Jerome Slater: "The demythologizing work of Sternhell and his fellow new historians is, finally, profoundly constructive-as they clearly intend it to be. If Israel is at last to become a genuinely liberal, fully democratic, and just society, it can only be built on the solid foundation of historical truth and reconciliation with the Palestinians, who have been the victims of Zionist success."

According to Don Peretz: "Sternhell’s treatise, among the more iconoclastic works of Israel’s 'new historians', is bound to spark controversy. He has directly and sharply confronted several of the country’s leading scholars for what, he maintains, are their distortions or misrepresentations in the conventional heroic portraits of Labor movement icons, in their visions of the Jewish State, and in the events and circumstances leading to establishment of Israel. [...] But Sternhell’s critics will be hard put to refute his arguments, which are extensively documented with primary sources from Zionist and Labor movement archives and from the written works and correspondence of the Zionist leaders that the author cites."

Arthur Herzberg of the New York Times says that Sternhell has written two books in one. "His opening pages and the epilogue are a polemical pamphlet about the future of Israel, [...] the bulk of the book [..] is a monograph in which Sternhell argues -- and presents as a hitherto unnoticed truth -- that the founders of socialist Zionism in Israel [...] committed the original sin of being much more nationalist than socialist." Herzberg is very critical of Sternhell's criticism: "Ben-Gurion's Labor Zionists were certainly much more democratic than the makers of the Bolshevik Revolution or the leaders of the Arab Higher Committee in Palestine in the 1930s. But can anyone imagine the creation of the Zionist state without their determined, single-minded and sometimes autocratic leadership?"

=== Criticism by Shalev ===
According to Shalev the most innovative aspect of Sternhell's work is his comparison of Zionism with national socialism:

Sternhell’s most original and provocative conclusion is that the closest European analog to labor Zionism, and a direct influence upon it, was national socialism. The multi-ethnic empires to the East of the Rhine were the cradle of national socialist ideology, which—just like Zionist constructivism— argued that class cleavages should be subordinated to the national interest; that the nation had a responsibility to act justly toward its most productive element, the working class; and that the national interest was threatened by parasites and dissenters from within and aliens beyond.

He says that most of Sternhell's other claims were basically already stated earlier, notably by Jonathan Shapiro and members of the radical left. The latter have always held that Labor Zionism's socialist pretensions were nothing but a façade.

Shalev's criticism focusses on Sternhell's assertion that the founding fathers made a “conscious ideological choice to sacrifice socialism on the altar of nationalism”. According to Shalev he overestimates the role of ideology and underestimates that of the practical circumstances. “It is these circumstances, and the response to them, which explain the most fateful and important ideological choice of the labor movement’s founding fathers: their commitment to separatism as the guiding principle to, simultaneously, the economic and the national life of the Yishuv.”

According to Shalev in contrast to the colonists of the First Aliyah, those of the Second Aliyah "lacked either the financial means to participate as purchasers in the land market, or the advantages enjoyed by indigenous workers in competing for jobs in the labor market." It proved essential for their survival to engage in collective action vis á vis the ikarim, the independent farmers and the World Zionist Organization, their potential sponsor. "In both cases, Jewish separatism was indispensable". Since Arab workers were cheaper, the ikarim could only be forced to employ Jews if their access to Arab labor was cut off, which the labor movement tried by adopting the concept of Hebrew labor, the demand that Jewish employers hire only Jewish workers, but which really only succeeded after 1936 as a result of the Arab Revolt.

Shalev concludes that "Labor Zionism developed in Palestine as an alliance between a worker’s movement without work and a settlement movement without settlers."

=== Criticism by Gorny ===
Gorny agrees with Sternhell that the period of the Second and Third Aliyah shaped the Jewish labor movement in Palestine and that it was ideology that fashioned this generation of immigrants to establish a nationalist society. Gorny claims however, "that this was achieved precisely because of the socialist ethos and myth".

According to Gorny "constructive socialism" was created as a common ideological basis on which the Labor movement could focus "in the absence of any real possibility of separating the different conflicting ideas" present within the movement. It "allowed for unity despite contrasts". Gorny gives four reasons for the unifying force of "constructive socialism":

- the pluralistic ideology in which it was grounded: it did not deny the existence of conflicting opinions
- by its character it was most practical in dealing with real conditions
- it "not only preached socialism as a doctrine, but practiced it in daily life [....] In other words, minority groups espousing radical socialist doctrines could not accuse the majority of betraying social ideals"
- "the belief that the Jewish working class was destined to play a decisive historical role within the Jewish national movement. Such an effort would be impossible without uniting the various forces."

Gorny goes on to criticise three basic formulations upon which Sternhell constructs his thesis.

- Sternhell purposely blurs the borderline that separates the words "nationalism" [leumiyut] and "chauvinistic nationalism" [leumaniyut].
- Sternhell is convinced that a synthesis between Marxist ideology and Kantian ethics was characteristic of Western socialism, a synthesis that was not present in the ideology of the Labor movement. Gorny questions whether this synthesis did actually exist in Western social democracy, e.g. in Britain.
- Sternhell asserts that "constructive socialism" was a typical "national socialist" concept. Gorny says it "was the outgrowth of the unique national condition of the Jewish People". He writes: "Therefore, when a 'nationalist-socialist' in a normal society in his own country, in his own political system and distinct economic class structure, preaches the organic unity of the nation, that is one matter. But when a constructive socialist calls for the unification of the nation in order to mobilize it for a common effort to create a 'normal society' in his own contemporary terms—that is a very different matter."

==== Sternhell's response to Gorny ====
Sternhell responded to Gorny, saying that Gorny's critique was a typical example of the results of the isolated non-comparative study of Israeli history as practised by Gorny. Sternhell writes that "there can be nothing more trivial than to claim that every historical situation is unique, and there can be no more miserable way of avoiding the necessity of treating historical events in a broad perspective and in accordance with universal criteria. It is obvious that every event occurs in its own particular time and place, [... but ...] the historian’s craft is not identical with the stamp-collector’s"

Sternhell argues that "constructive socialism" was indeed a "nationalist socialist" concept. He writes:

"Zionism, like all the national movements in Central and Eastern Europe, is derived from the concept of the nation originating with Johann Gottfried Herder at the end of the eighteenth century. According to Herder, the basis of collective political identity and the partnership between people is the sharing of a common culture and not membership in a political community. Culture, he said, is the expression of an inner consciousness, and it is this consciousness that makes one feel oneself to be an inseparable part of the social body. People united by a common culture — history, language, religion — form an organic unit resembling an extended family. This was the concept of the nation of Israel’s founding fathers"

Regarding Gorny's critique on Sternhell's three basic formulations the latter writes:

- "It is no accident that Gorny needs a transcription from Hebrew" in his distinction between le‘umiyut [nationalism] and le‘umaniyut [chauvinistic nationalism]. This distinction has "no analytical significance" and "was never anything except an alibi that our national movement invented in order to distinguish between its claims, which were 'national', and those of the Arabs, which were 'chauvinistic'. [...] Academic study recognizes only one concept [...], accompanied by the appropriate adjective.
- "Indeed, the synthesis of Marx’s philosophy of history and critique of capitalism with Kant’s philosophy of liberty was the essence of Western social-democracy, with the exception of the British Labour Party, until the Russian Revolution. [...] All other European socialists learned the lesson of the Great War and abhorred the tribal nationalism that began to dominate continental Europe."
- Gorny's claim that only the Jewish people were in an "abnormal" situation is dismissed by Sternhell. He writes: "All nationalist socialism regards its own human reality as abnormal. According to nationalist socialism, man and nation are always in need of basic reform; the nation is always in danger, requiring emergency measures to be taken. Its situation is always unique, not comparable with anything else, which absolves it from having to comply with universal norms applicable to 'normal' societies."

Sternhell says that Gorny's assertion that he has hinted at a similarity between constructive socialism and Italian fascism is absurd. He writes: “Nationalist socialism was an autonomous system that could both develop in a totalitarian direction and refrain from taking this path. The Eretz Israeli version did not become totalitarian, but nevertheless remained distinct from democratic socialism.”

=== Criticism by Sharkansky ===
Ira Sharkansky writes that Sternhell fails to consider the matter of income equality in a comparative perspective. He presents statistical data that shows that Israel's income equality in the 1990s is comparable to that of other countries with approximately the same Gross National Product per capita. He also argues that Sternhell's assertion that the Labor Zionist leadership failed to address the issue of income equality is unfair. Before 1948 the leaders had to rely on voluntary contributions and the Yishuv was poor compared to Western European countries. After 1948 they had to spend a lot on the military and there were a lot of poor immigrants.

==== Sternhell's response to Sharkansky ====
Sternhell called Sharkansky's analysis "narrow" and "technical". He says that the Zionist leadership in the 1930s had enough power to try develop a social policy, but that they "refused to make the Histadrut economy pay the cost" and "did not even attempt to pursue a social policy for the assistance of the poorer segments of society". The reason for this was their elitist perception of social action: it was not relevant for "the consolidation of national strength".

In the first twenty-five years of Israel's existence the same elite consciously neglected the underprivileged. Secondary education was inaccessible to large segments of the manual workers and new immigrants. "Until the revolt of the 'Black Panthers' at the beginning of the 1970s, Israel did not have any social policies at all." This derived from ideology. Sternhell cites the UN expert professor Philip Klein, who investigated the matter for two years at the end of the 1950s: "[It is not solely, or even] chiefly administrative action, that calls for revision; it is rather the spirit and objectives behind the administration and its guiding outlook and philosophy [...] The Welfare State is a State for the welfare of workers, producers, builders of an economy and of a national ideal."
