= Le Blé en herbe (1954 film) =

1954 film by Claude Autant-Lara

- Directed by: Claude Autant-Lara
- Written by: Jean Aurenche (adaptation et dialogue de); Pierre Bost (adaptation et dialogue); Claude Autant-Lara (adaptation et dialogue de)
- Based on: Colette (D'après le roman de)
- Produced by: Henry Deutschmeister
- Starring: Edwige Feuillère; Nicole Berger; Pierre-Michel Beck
- Cinematography: Robert Lefebvre
- Edited by: Madeleine Gug
- Music by: René Cloërec
- Color process: Black and white
- Production companies: Franco London Films; William Shelton Films Inc.
- Distributed by: Gaumont Distribution
- Release date: 20 January 1954
- Running time: 109 minutes
- Country: France
- Language: French

Le Blé en herbe (English title: The Immature Grain) is a 1954 French drama film by Claude Autant-Lara based on the 1923 novel of the same name by French novelist Colette. The film stars Edwige Feuillère, Pierre-Michel Beck (as Philippe), Nicole Berger (as Vinca Ferret), Robert Berri and Louis de Funès. It is black and white with a monaural soundtrack.

== Plot ==
The plot involves the relationship between a young man and an older woman, or in one critic's summary, "an older woman ... introduces a teenager ... to the mysteries of love".

== Cast ==
- Edwige Feuillère as Madame Dalleray / la dame en blanc-the lady in white
- Nicole Berger as Vinca
- Pierre-Michel Beck as Phililippe
- Robert Berri as Le brigadier
- Simone Duhart as La femme du projectionniste / projectionist's wife
- Hélène Tossy as Madame Ferret / la mère de Vinca
- Charles Dechamps as Monsieur Ferret / o'oncle
- Louis de Funès as projectionist
- Renée Devillers as Madame Audebert / la mère de Philippe
- Claude Berri as projectionist's son

== Marketing ==
Promotional materials for the film presented it as "the story of two adolescents' love affair and its interruption by an older woman" and called attention to the controversy the film had generated in France. Feuillère was born in 1907, Beck in 1938.

== Awards ==
The film was awarded the 1954 Grand Prix du Cinéma Français

== Controversy ==
In the United States it was subject to a series of attempts to prevent its screening. It received a Class C or "condemned" rating from the Roman Catholic National Legion of Decency. The film was banned in Massachusetts until a court ruling in July 1955 considering the case of Miss Julie, a 1951 Swedish film, held the state's motion picture censorship law unconstitutional. Boston officials were unable to ban it but termed it "unwholesomely immoral". A similar ban in Baltimore was overturned by a Maryland court. The film's distributors sued unsuccessfully in federal court to overturn Chicago's ban. Eleven of the twelve jurors who viewed the film with U.S. District Court Judge Joseph Sam Perry supported his assessment that the film was "immoral and obscene". After the Court of Appeals upheld that ruling, the distributors, the Times Film Corporation, appealed to the U.S. Supreme Court, which ruled in November 1957 that the film did not meet the standard the Court used for determining obscenity, that is, appealing to prurient interest. The justices viewed the film and upheld Chicago's obscenity statute but objected to its application to this film.

== Notes ==
The literal translation of the French title is Ripening Wheat.

== See also ==
- List of French films of 1954
