= Neither Right nor Left =

1983 book by Zeev Sternhell

Neither Right nor Left: Fascist Ideology in France
- Author: Zeev Sternhell
- Original title: Ni droite, ni gauche. L'idéologie fasciste en France
- Translator: David Maisel
- Language: French language
- Subject: Political history of the French Third Republic
- Publisher: Editions du Seuil
- Publication date: 1983
- Publication place: France
- English publication date: 1987 (University of California Press)

Neither Right nor Left: Fascist Ideology in France (French: Ni droite, ni gauche. L'idéologie fasciste en France) is an influential book on the political history of Interwar France by the historian Zeev Sternhell. It was first published in French by Éditions du Seuil in 1983. It is part of a trilogy of books by Sternhell looking at the origins of fascism in France before World War II.

Neither Right nor Left proposed a revisionist account of fascism which argued that political and intellectual life in France in the 1930s had become "saturated" with fascist ideas and argued that all parts of the political spectrum had been affected. This broke with previous analyses which had argued that such thinking had been restricted to the far-right and only of marginal importance before World War II and the emergence of the Vichy regime in June 1940. It also emphasised fascism's origins in socialist thinking.

According to one historian, "[f]ew books on European history in recent memory have caused such controversy and commotion". It was first published in English translation by University of California Press in 1987.

== Context and argument ==
Neither Right nor Left is the third book of Sternhell's trilogy on the intellectual origins of fascism in France. Sternhell published Maurice Barrès et le nationalisme français (1972) and La Droite révolutionnaire (1978) which addressed the intellectual origins of Maurice Barrès and the development of largely unsuccessful radical right-wing movements in France before 1914. According to Robert Wohl, in Neither Right nor Left:

Sternhell recapitulated the central arguments of La Droite révolutionnaire, stated them with even greater force, escalating them audaciously, and extended them into the interwar period, claiming (in implicit contrast to earlier books) that by 1940 French political culture was thoroughly saturated (imprégnée) by fascist ideology. Only this fascist penetration of French political and intellectual life, Sternhell insisted, could explain the abruptness of the French defeat and the radical transformation of French political institutions after the creation of the Vichy regime in June 1940.

Sternhell did not apply the concept of fascism rigorously to a particular political movement. Rather, he "described a mood or complex of ideas in which fascism was one but not the only, or even most important, variant. This mentality took the form of a general rejection of liberal values and institutions as they existed under the Third Republic combined with an acute anxiety about the future of France." As a result, he argues that fascist ideas permeated across the political spectrum and drew on various disparate political traditions from far-right nationalists to personalists and revisionist Marxists. In particular, Sternhell argued that fascism was chiefly "a product of the left-wing revisionism of Marxist socialism". As a result, he emphasizes the commitment to planisme among many authoritarian former socialists such as Henri de Man, a Belgian, and Marcel Déat. In his argument, the central elements of fascism were "ultra-nationalism" and "anti-materialist socialism".

Wohl argues that the book's radicalism lay in the contrast with the previous tendency to think of fascism as a marginal or weak force in French politics. It also broke with the existing consensus that French fascism originated in the experience of World War I and was imported from Italy and Germany rather than emerging from France's indigenous political traditions.

== Reception ==
Neither Right nor Left was considered extremely polemical on its publication in France. In contrast to earlier studies which were like "earnest documentaries", Roger Griffin stated the work "can be likened to a major series originally made from prime-time TV abroad where it caused so much controversy that it was soon dubbed into English and has now been released on video". He described it as an "indispensable text" for the study of fascism.

In the aftermath of the appearance of the French edition, Sternhell was sued for defamation by Bertrand de Jouvenel in 1983 after the book described him as having been a fascist in the 1930s. Jouvenel, on whose behalf the anti-fascist intellectual Raymond Aron testified, sued him on nine counts. The judge found Sternhell liable on two counts but imposed only symbolic damages and permitted Sternhell to retain the offending passages in future editions of the book. Robert Wohl states that this was a "major defeat" for the plaintiff.

Sternhell published a revised and expanded edition in French in 1987 with Éditions Complexe which reaffirmed his earlier thesis.

== Citations ==
=== References ===
- Griffin, Roger (1997). "Solving the Fascist Conundrum". European History Quarterly. 27 (4): 573–580. doi:10.1177/026569149702700407.
- Wohl, Robert (1991). "French Fascism, Both Right and Left: Reflections on the Sternhell Controversy". The Journal of Modern History. 63 (1): 91–98. doi:10.1086/244261. ISSN 0022-2801. JSTOR 2938528.
