= Mitsou (novella) =

Mitsou is the name of a French war-time novella that was published by Colette in 1919. It was later made into a 1956 film Mitsou.

The eponymous protagonist, a 24-year-old star performing in a show at the Montmartre in Paris in 1917, hides briefly two lieutenants in her garderobe to help her friend Petite Chose. One of the men is the educated "blue lieutenant". He writes to her the next day thanking her, and Mitsou's surprisingly eloquent response results in an exchange of letters which express their blossoming attraction and love. Eventually, the lieutenant returns for a brief and singular visit. An apparently final exchange of letters seems to conclude the affair, although Mitsou does not give up hope for a future of the relationship.

The well-received novella contains play-like dialogue between Mitsou and the people around her as well as the letter exchange. The main characters are based on her second husband's brother, Robert de Jouvenel, and his mistress, Zou, but may also reflect a young Colette in her early relationship with her future first husband Henry Gauthier-Villars.

== Movie ==
The 1956 French film Mitsou is based on Colette's story. Danièle Delorme played the main character.
