= Enid McLeod =

British writer (1896–1985)

Enid Devoge McLeod (1896 – 11 April 1985) was a British cultural diplomat and writer who worked for the British Council. She was the first woman in the Council to be promoted to Representative and led the Council's French office in Paris. She was known also as an author and a translator of French literature.

== Early life and education ==
McLeod was born in Bristol, the second child of Alexander McLeod, a travelling confectionery salesman, and Lucie McLeod (née Wild).

She attended Redland High School in Bristol and St Hugh's College, Oxford, where she read for the new English Literature and Language course. She graduated in 1920.

== Interwar period ==
Upon graduation, and finding that employment opportunities for educated women were relatively limited, McLeod worked as a secretary for Gilbert Murray and Bertrand Russell. She spent time in France, able to stay in Paris with a friend, Hélène Humbert. She came under the influence of Thomas Wentworth Pym, at the Cambridge Settlement House in south London.

Through the house, Mcleod made female friends, particularly Ethel Whitehorn (1894–1979) whom she knew from 1921. Lorna Southwell, another graduate of St Hugh's whom she knew through Pym and his wife, gave her a chance of a temporary job as secretary to Hugh Crichton-Miller at his nursing home. She became a personal friend of André Gide: her partner Ethel had met him through Élisabeth van Rysselberghe. Gide's short novel Geneviève, an attempt as he wrote on 9 March 1930 in his journal to address feminism, drew on conversation he had heard in England from Enid, Ethel, Élisabeth and Dorothy Bussy. The final part of a set of three novellas, it cost Gide much difficulty in its writing.

In 1924, McLeod was in Paris, met up with Gide, and went on to Pontigny. She had met Roger Martin du Gard, and planned to translate his novel series Les Thibault, though this did not come about. The invitation to the Décades de Pontigny was a compensation for the disappointment, arranged by the feminist Loup Mayrisch (Aline de Saint-Hubert) in Gide's circle. McLeod there encountered the poet Guglielmo Alberti, and later through him knew Umberto Morra and Alexandre Passerin d'Entrèves. McLeod and Whitehorn both attended the Décades in 1929, and subsequently.

McLeod in 1938 went to work at Chatham House, one of the editorial team completing the African Survey of Lord Hailey.

== Later life ==
During the Second World War, McLeod worked for the Ministry of Information and rose to become head of the French Section. Consulted on the plan of 1943 to invite Gide, at the time in Algiers, to the United Kingdom, she was in favour of the idea, but warned that the Political Warfare Executive should not be involved because Gide was counter-suggestible. Nothing came of it. When France was liberated in 1944, she was one of the first British civilians to be invited to the country by the new French government.

At interview for a permanent civil service position in 1945, McLeod expressed an interest in the Foreign Office, from which she was at that point barred as a woman. She then revealed she had already had an offer. She worked for the British Council from 1945, first as Regional Commissioner, then by 1947 as Director of the Western European Section. During 1947, a financial hiatus left McLeod at a loose end, and she did some uncredited translation work for Stuart Gilbert, on a novel by Pierre Véry (Le pays sans étoiles? of 1945, already filmed as Land Without Stars of 1946, its English title, English translation appearing as In What Strange Land ...? of 1949).

In 1954, McLeod was promoted to be the Council's Representative in France, taking overall responsibility for directing Council activity in the country. She held the post until 1959. She simultaneously held the post of cultural attaché at the British Embassy in Paris.

== Literary career ==
McLeod was also a noted writer, drawing on her interest in medieval history and French literature. She published biographies of Heloïse, Christine de Pizan, and Charles of Orléans, for which she was awarded the Duff Cooper Memorial Prize in 1970. She published an autobiography, Living Twice, in 1982.

Her translation work in 1947, with Stuart Gilbert, was (as she wrote to him) a trial of her aptitude. In 1953 her English translations of novels by Colette with biographical content appeared, as well as the autobiographical La Maison de Claudine (1922) with Una Vicenzo Troubridge, and Sido (1930), based on the life of her mother.

== Awards and honours ==
McLeod was appointed a Commander of the British Empire, and was an officer of the Legion d'Honneur and of the Ordre des Palmes académiques.

== Legacy ==
The Franco-British Society formerly gave The Enid McLeod Literary Award, "presented annually to the author of a work published in the UK which is considered to have contributed most to Franco-British understanding." The award was renamed as The Franco-British Society Book Prize.
