= Henry de Jouvenel =

French statesman (1876–1935)

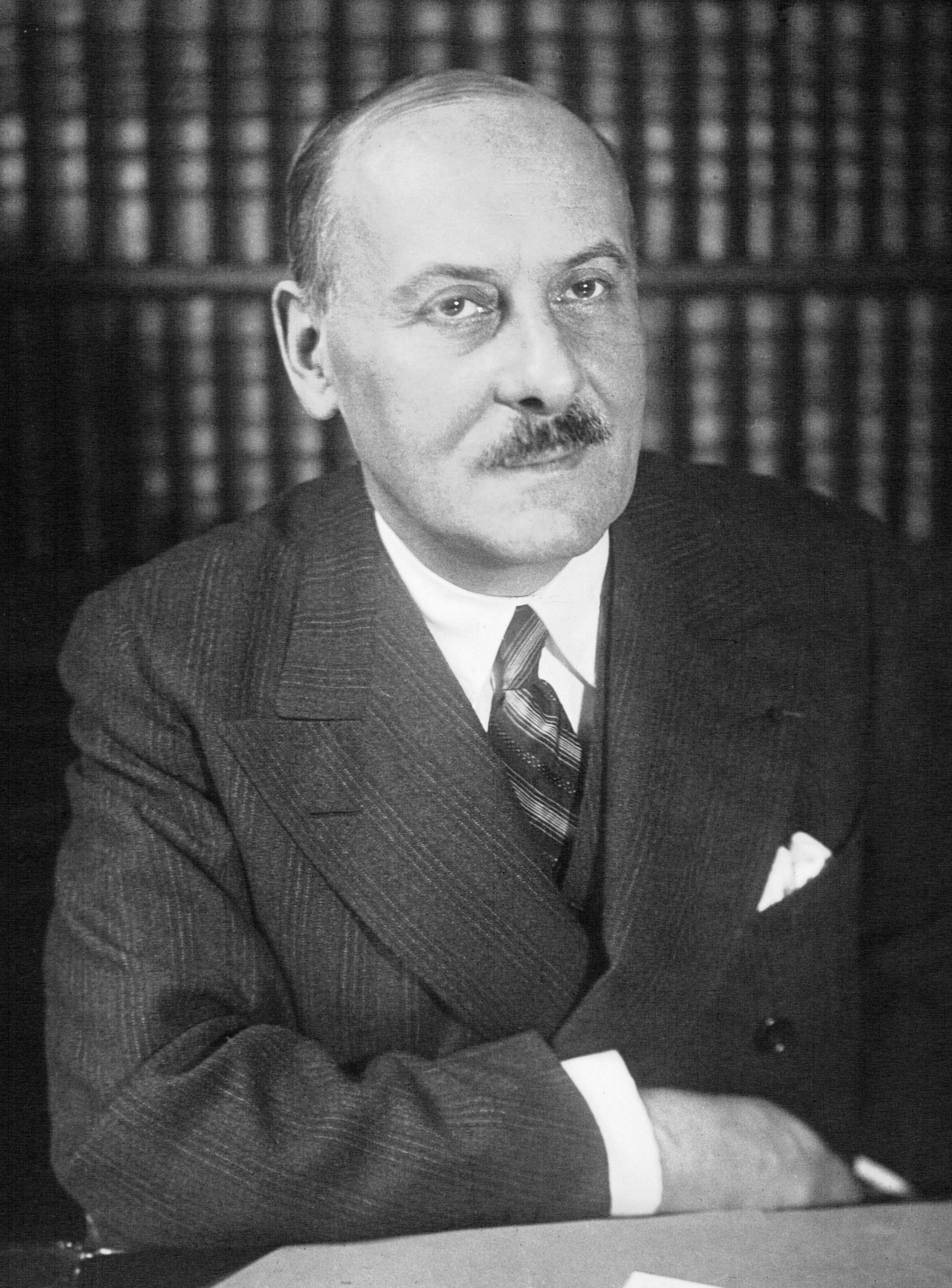
- Henri de Jouvenel, senator, ambassador of France in Rome (1933)

High Commissioner of the Levant
- In office 1925–1926
- Preceded by: Maurice Sarrail
- Succeeded by: Henri Ponsot

Personal details
- Born: Henry de Jouvenel des Ursins; 5 April 1876 Paris, France
- Died: 5 October 1935 (aged 59) Paris, France
- Spouse(s): Sarah Boas (divorced); Sidonie-Gabrielle Colette (divorced)
- Children: with Boas: --Bertrand de Jouvenel with Colette: --Colette de Jouvenel
- Occupation: diplomat

Henry de Jouvenel des Ursins (French pronunciation: [ɑ̃ʁi də ʒuvnɛl dez‿yʁsɛ̃]; 5 April 1876 – 5 October 1935) was a French journalist and statesman. He was the French High Commissioner in Syria and Lebanon from 23 December 1925 until 23 June 1926.

== Personal life ==
Henry de Jouvenel was born into a middle-class family of lawyers and politicians. He was educated at the prestigious Collège Stanislas de Paris. According to his biographer Rudolph Binion:

Henry de Jouvenel never outgrew the spirit of his schooldays -- his humanism, his enthusiasm for ideas, the original blend of audacity and courtesy in his thinking, his dream of detecting and expressing unanimity amid discord. He matured, not by putting these things aside, but by adding to them.

Jouvenel's first wife was Sarah Boas, the daughter of a Jewish industrialist. They had a son, Bertrand de Jouvenel, in 1903. Henri divorced Sarah in 1912. That same year he married the novelist Sidonie-Gabrielle Colette. The couple had one daughter, Colette de Jouvenel, known to the family as Bel-Gazou ("beautiful babbling/chirping" in local dialect). They divorced in 1924 after Colette became involved romantically with Henry's son Bertrand. This affair became the subject of Colette's novel Le Blé en Herbe ("Green Wheat").

He was the brother of the French journalist Robert de Jouvenel.

== See also ==
- High Commissioner
- French Mandate for Syria and the Lebanon
