= Edwige Feuillère =

French actress (1907–1998)

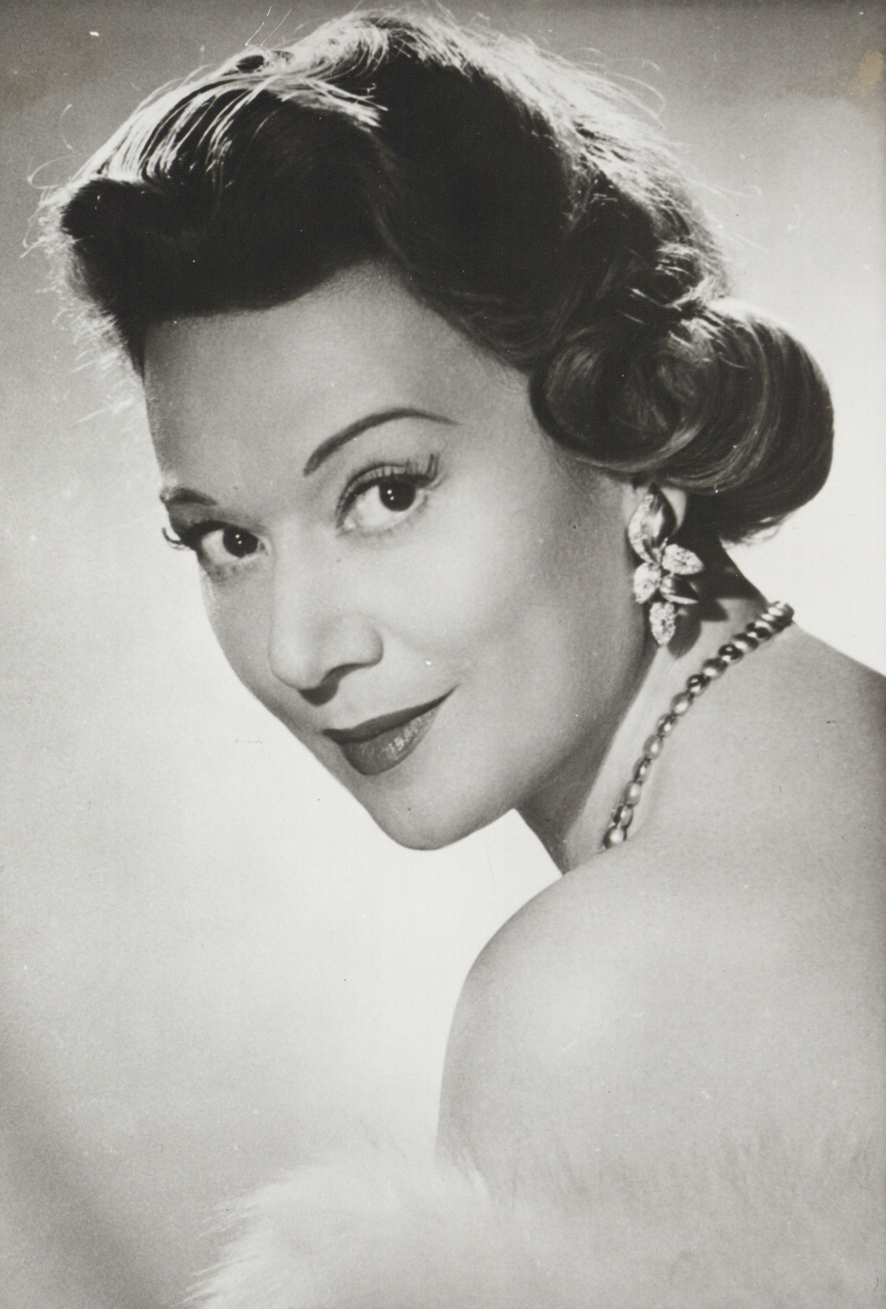
- Born: Edwige Louise Caroline Cunatti; 29 October 1907; Vesoul, Haute-Saône, Franche-Comté, France
- Died: 13 November 1998 (aged 91); Boulogne-Billancourt, Hauts-de-Seine, Île-de-France
- Other name: Cora Lynn
- Occupation: Actress
- Years active: 1931–1995
- Spouse: Pierre Feuillère (m. 1930; div. 1933)

Edwige Feuillère (born Edwige Louise Caroline Cunatti; 29 October 1907 – 13 November 1998) was a French stage and film actress.

== Biography ==
She was born Edwige Louise Caroline Cunatti to an Italian architect father and an Alsace-born mother. She was raised primarily in Dijon. In 1931 she married actor Pierre Feuillère, from whom she separated two years later (1933), but kept his surname. She acted from 1931 until 1995.

== Death ==
She died of natural causes, aged 91.

== Selected filmography ==
- 1931: La Fine Combine (Short, dir. André Chotin) – Mado, the mistress
- 1931: Mam'zelle Nitouche (dir Marc Allégret) – Une théâtreuse (uncredited)
- 1931: The Champion Cook (dir. Alberto Cavalcanti) – Régine
- 1932: Monsieur Albert (dir. Karl Anton) – Comtesse Peggy Ricardi
- 1932: La Perle (dir. René Guissart) – Viviane Lancenay
- 1932: Une petite femme dans le train (dir. Karl Anton) – Adolphine
- 1932: Make-Up (dir. Karl Anton) – Ketty
- 1932: Le Beau Rôle (Short, dir. Roger Capellani)
- 1932: Une étoile disparaît (dir. Robert Villers) – sous réserves
- 1933: Topaze (dir. Louis Gasnier) – Suzy Courtois
- 1933: Number 33 (dir. Karl Anton) – Helena Schweringen
- 1933: Les Aventures du roi Pausole (dir. Alexis Granowski) – Diane
- 1933: La Voix de métal (L'appel de nuit) (dir. Youly Marca-Rosa) – Comtesse Viana
- 1934: Toi, que j'adore (dir. Géza von Bolváry & Albert Valentin) – Jacqueline Boulanger
- 1934: Ces messieurs de la Santé (dir. Pierre Colombier) – Fernande
- 1935: Barcarolle (dir. Gerhard Lamprecht & Roger Le Bon) – Giacinta
- 1935: The Decoy (dir. Hans Steinhoff & Roger Le Bon) – Délia
- 1935: Golgotha (dir. Julien Duvivier) – Claudia Procula
- 1935: Stradivarius (dir. Albert Valentin & Géza von Bolváry) – Maria Belloni
- 1935: Lucrezia Borgia (dir. Abel Gance) – Lucrezia Borgia
- 1936: The Happy Road (dir. Georges Lacombe) – Suzanne
- 1936: Compliments of Mister Flow (dir. Robert Siodmak) – Lady Héléna Scarlett
- 1936: Amore (Italian version of the previous film, dir. Carlo L. Bragaglia) – Suzanne
- 1937: Marthe Richard (dir. Raymond Bernard) – Marthe Richard
- 1937: Woman of Malacca (dir. Marc Allégret) – Audrey Greenwood
- 1937: Feu! (dir. Jacques de Baroncelli) – Edwige Elno
- 1938: I Was an Adventuress (dir. Raymond Bernard) – Véra Vronsky
- 1939: There's No Tomorrow (dir. Max Ophüls) – Evelyne
- 1940: The Emigrant (dir. Léo Joannon) – Christiane Vallier
- 1940: Sarajevo (dir. Max Ophüls) – Comtesse Sophie Choteck
- 1942: Mam'zelle Bonaparte (dir. Maurice Tourneur) – Cora Pearl, the courtesan
- 1942: The Duchess of Langeais (dir. Jacques de Baroncelli) – Antoinette de Langeais
- 1942: The Honourable Catherine (dir. Marcel L'Herbier) – Catherine Roussel
- 1943: Lucrèce (dir. Léo Joannon) – Lucrèce, the celebrated actress
- 1945: La Part de l'ombre (dir. Jean Delannoy) – Agnès Noblet
- 1946: Tant que je vivrai (dir. Jacques de Baroncelli) – Ariane
- 1946: The Idiot (dir. Georges Lampin) – Nastasia Philipovna
- 1946: Once is Enough (dir. Andrée Feix) – Christine Jourdan, sculptor
- 1947: The Eagle with Two Heads (dir. Jean Cocteau) – Queen Natascha
- 1948: Woman Hater (dir. Terence Young) – Colette Marly
- 1948: La Norvège sans les vikings (documentary she produced)
- 1949: Julie de Carneilhan (dir. Jacques Manuel) – Julie de Carneilhan
- 1950: Lost Souvenirs (dir. Christian-Jaque) – Florence (segment "Une statuette d'Osiris")
- 1951: Olivia (dir. Jacqueline Audry) – Mlle Julie
- 1951: The Cape of Hope (dir. Raymond Bernard) – Lyria, landlady of the "Sea-Bar"
- 1952: Adorables Créatures (dir. Christian-Jaque) – Denise Aubusson, the elegant widow
- 1954: Le Blé en herbe (dir. Claude Autant-Lara) – Mme Camille Dalleray, the woman in white
- 1955: Fruits of Summer (dir. Raymond Bernard) – Sabine Gravières, the antique dealer
- 1957: The Seventh Commandment (dir. Raymond Bernard) – Princess Nadia Vronskaïa
- 1957: Quand la femme s'en mêle (dir. Yves Allégret) – Maine, former wife of Félix
- 1958: Love Is My Profession (dir. Claude Autant-Lara) – Viviane Gobillot, the wife of André
- 1958: Life Together (dir. Clément Duhour) – Françoise Sellier, ex: Carreau
- 1961: Les Amours célèbres (an anthology film inspired by the comic strips of Paul Gordeaux, dir. Michel Boisrond) – Mademoiselle Raucourt (segment "Les comédiennes")
- 1962: Le Crime ne paie pas (an anthology film inspired by the comic strips of Paul Gordeaux, dir. Gérard Oury) – Dona Lucrezia (segment "Le masque")
- 1964: Aimez-vous les femmes ? (dir. Jean Léon) – Aunt Flo
- 1964: La Bonne Occase (dir. Michel Drach) – Comtesse de Saint-Plas
- 1967: La Route d'un homme (TV Short, dir. Georges Hacquard) – Récitante / Narrator (voice)
- 1968: Et si on faisait l'amour ("Sensi facciamo l'amore") (dir. Vittorio Caprioli) – Giuditta Passani
- 1970: OSS 117 prend des vacances (dir. Pierre Kalfon) – Comtesse de Labarthe
- 1970: Clair de Terre (dir. Guy Gilles) – Mme Larivière
- 1975: La Chair de l'orchidée (dir. Patrice Chéreau) – Mme Bastier-Wegener
- 1982: Cher menteur (TV Movie)
- 1993: Dis papa, raconte-moi là-bas (dir. Guy Gilles) – (voice)
