= Julie de Carneilhan (film) =

- Directed by: Jacques Manuel
- Written by: Jean-Pierre Gredy; Jacques Manuel
- Based on: Julie de Carneilhan by Colette
- Produced by: Alexandre Mnouchkine
- Starring: Edwige Feuillère; Pierre Brasseur; Jacques Dumesnil
- Cinematography: Philippe Agostini
- Edited by: Charlotte Guilbert
- Music by: Henri Sauguet
- Production companies: Les Films Ariane; La Société des Films Sirius
- Distributed by: La Société des Films Sirius
- Release date: 21 April 1950
- Running time: 95 minutes
- Country: France
- Language: French

Julie de Carneilhan is a 1950 French drama film directed by Jacques Manuel and starring Edwige Feuillère, Pierre Brasseur and Jacques Dumesnil. It is an adaptation of the 1941 novel of the same title by Colette. The film's sets were designed by the art director René Moulaert.

== Synopsis ==
Julie de Carneilhan is divorced from her husband who he she still loves. He has married a second wife, a wealthy woman, and pursued a career in politics. He dreams up a scheme for him and Julie to extract money from his wife who holds the purse strings in the relationship.

== Cast ==
- Edwige Feuillère as Julie de Carneilhan
- Pierre Brasseur as Hubert Espivant
- Jacques Dumesnil as Léon de Carneilhan
- Marcelle Chantal as Marianne
- Michel Lemoine as Toni
- Sylvia Bataille as Lucie
- Gabrielle Fontan as La concierge
- Marion Delbo as La mère Encelade
- Andrée Tainsy as Madame Sabrier
- Jacques Dacqmine as Coco Votard
- Georges Pally as Beaupied
- Georges Paulais as L'homme d'affaires
- Léon Berton as Le palefrenier

== Bibliography ==
- Parish, Robert. Film Actors Guide. Scarecrow Press, 1977.
