= Colette =

French novelist (1873–1954)

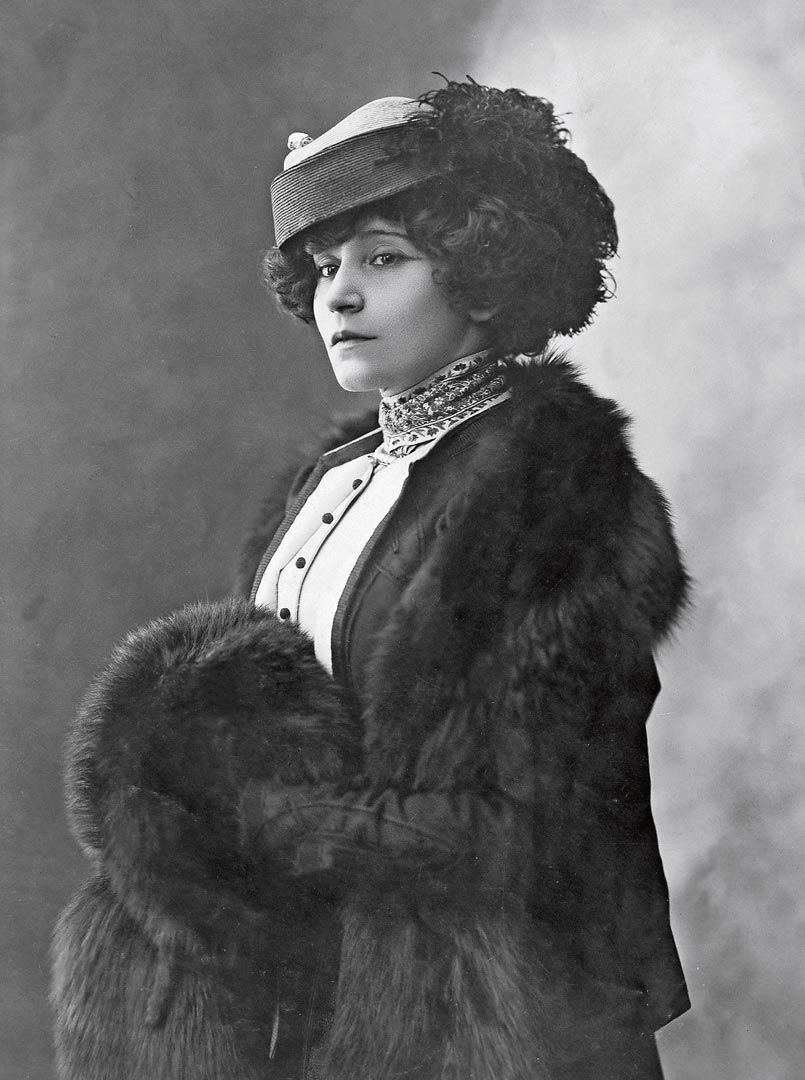
- Colette, possibly in the 1910s
- Born: Sidonie-Gabrielle Colette; 28 January 1873; Saint-Sauveur-en-Puisaye, Burgundy, France
- Died: 3 August 1954 (aged 81); Paris, France
- Resting place: Père Lachaise Cemetery
- Occupation: Novelist
- Spouse(s): Henry Gauthier-Villars (m. 1893; div. 1910) Henry de Jouvenel (m. 1912; div. 1924) Maurice Goudeket (m. 1935)
- Children: Colette de Jouvenel
- Writing career
- Pen name: Colette; Colette Willy
- Notable works: Gigi; The Tendrils of the Vine

Sidonie-Gabrielle Colette (French: [sidɔni ɡabʁijɛl kɔlɛt]; 28 January 1873 – 3 August 1954), known mononymously as Colette or as Colette Willy, was a French author and woman of letters. She was also a mime, actress, and journalist. Colette is best known in the English-speaking world for her 1944 novella Gigi, which was the basis for the 1958 film and the 1973 stage production of the same name. Her short story collection The Tendrils of the Vine is also famous in France.

== Early life ==
Sidonie-Gabrielle Colette was born on 28 June 1873 in the village of Saint-Sauveur-en-Puisaye in the department of Yonne, Burgundy. Her father, Captain Jules-Joseph Colette (1829–1905), was a war hero. He was a Zouave of the Saint-Cyr military school, who had lost a leg at Melegnano in the Second Italian War of Independence. He was awarded a post as tax collector in the village of Saint-Sauveur-en-Puisaye where his children were born. Her mother, Adèle Eugénie Sidonie, née Landoy (1835–1912) was nicknamed Sido. Colette's great-grandfather, Robert Landois, was a wealthy Martinican mulatto, who settled in Charleville in 1787. In an arranged first marriage to Jules Robineau Duclos, Colette's mother had two children: Juliette (1860–1908) and Achille (1863–1913). She later married Captain Colette and had two further children: Leopold (1866–1940) and Sidonie-Gabrielle. Colette attended a public school from the ages of 6 to 17. The family was initially well off, but poor financial management substantially reduced their income.

== Career ==
In 1893, Colette married Henry Gauthier-Villars (1859–1931), an author and publisher 14 years her senior, who used the pen name "Willy". Her first four novels – the four Claudine stories: Claudine à l'école (1900), Claudine à Paris (1901), Claudine en ménage (1902), and Claudine s'en va (1903) – appeared under his name. (The four are published in English as Claudine at School, Claudine in Paris, Claudine Married, and Claudine and Annie.)

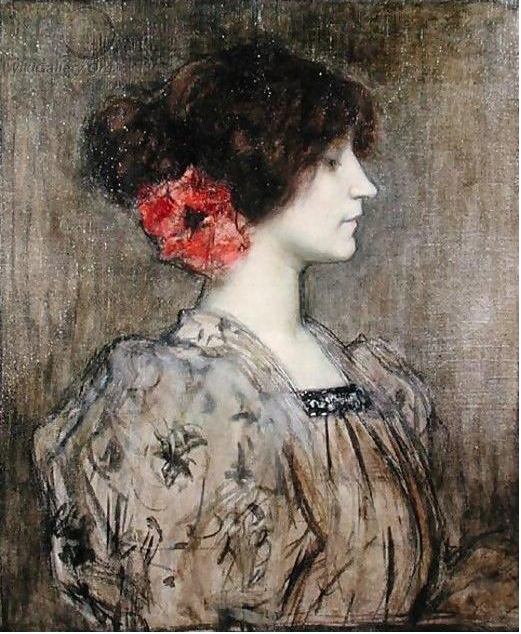
Colette, painted c. 1896 by Jacques Humbert

The novels chart the coming of age and young adulthood of their titular heroine, Claudine, from an unconventional 15-year old in a Burgundian village to a doyenne of the literary salons of turn-of-the-century Paris. The story they tell is semi-autobiographical, although Claudine, unlike Colette, is motherless.

The marriage to Gauthier-Villars allowed Colette to devote her time to writing. She later said she would never have become a writer if it had not been for Willy. One of the most notorious libertines in Paris, he introduced his wife into avant-garde intellectual and artistic circles and encouraged her lesbian dalliances. And it was he who chose the titillating subject matter of the Claudine novels: "the secondary myth of Sappho... the girls' school or convent ruled by a seductive female teacher." Willy "locked her [Colette] in her room until she produced enough pages to suit him."

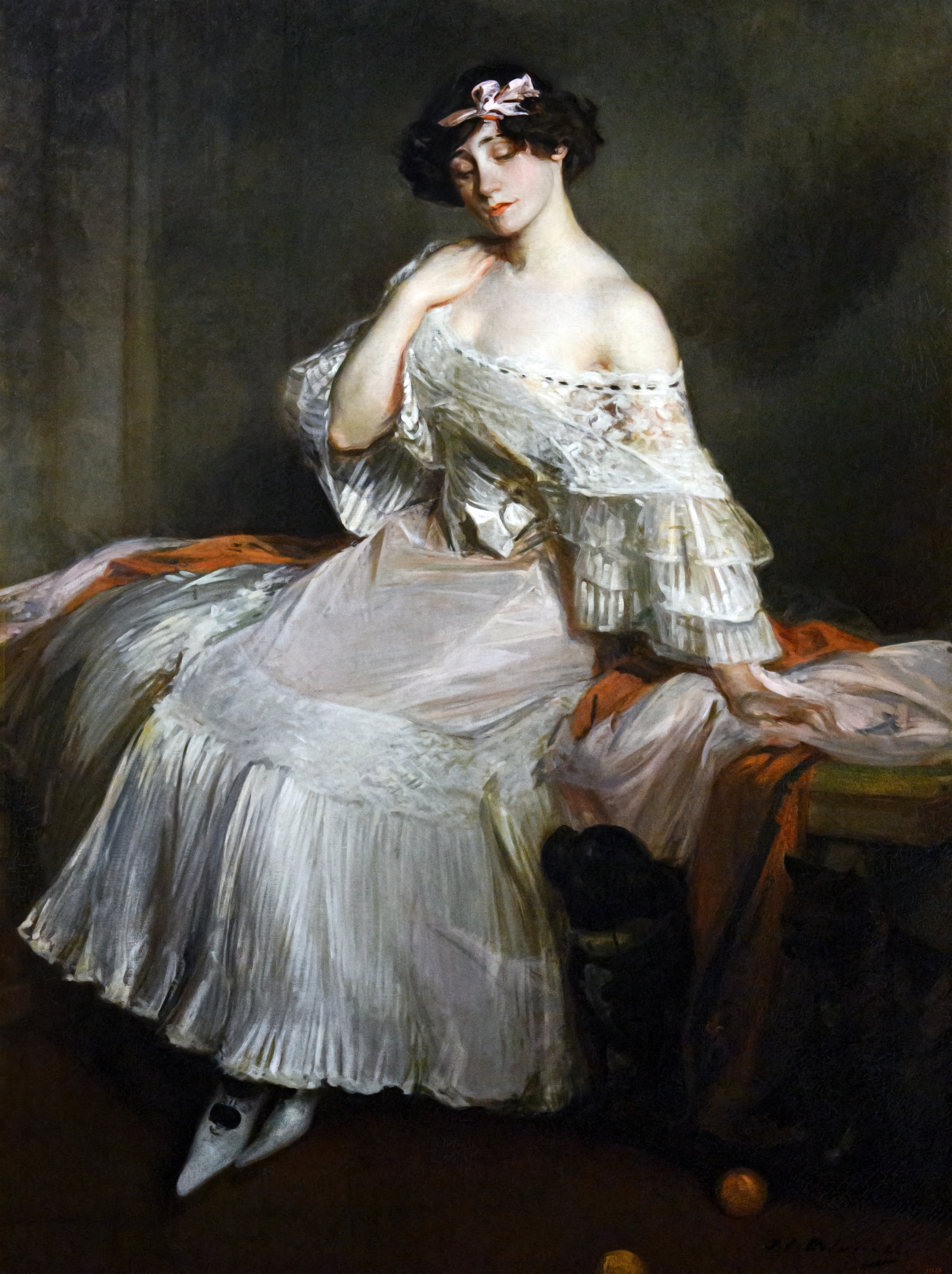
Portrait of Colette by Jacques-Émile Blanche, 1905, Museu Nacional d'Art de Catalunya

== Post divorce ==
Colette and Willy separated in 1906, although their divorce was not final until 1910. Colette had no access to the sizable earnings of the Claudine books – the copyright belonged to Willy – and until 1912 she conducted a stage career in music halls across France, sometimes playing Claudine in sketches from her own novels, earning barely enough to survive and often hungry and ill. To make ends meet, she turned more seriously to journalism in the 1910s. Around this time she also became an avid amateur photographer. This period of her life is recalled in La Vagabonde (1910), which deals with women's independence in a male society, a theme to which she would regularly return in future works.

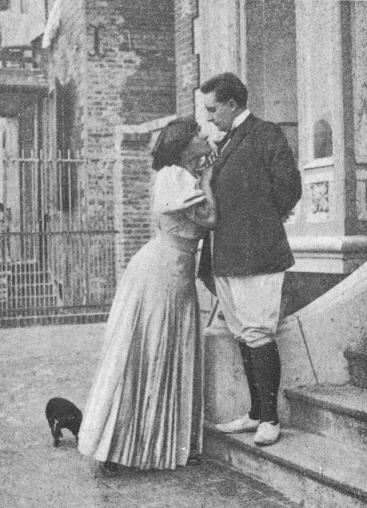
Colette and Mathilde "Missy" de Morny

During these years she embarked on a series of relationships with other women, notably with Natalie Clifford Barney and with Mathilde de Morny, the Marquise de Belbeuf ("Missy” or “Max"), with whom she sometimes shared the stage. On 3 January 1907, an onstage kiss between Max and Colette in a pantomime titled Rêve d'Égypte ("Dream of Egypt") caused a near-riot, and as a result, they were no longer able to live together openly, although their relationship continued for another five years.

In 1912, Colette married Henry de Jouvenel, the editor of Le Matin. A daughter, Colette de Jouvenel, nicknamed Bel-Gazou, was born to them in 1913.

== 1920s and 1930s ==
In 1920, Colette published Chéri, portraying love between an older woman and a much younger man. Chéri is the lover of Léa, a wealthy courtesan; Léa is devastated when Chéri marries a girl his own age and delighted when he returns to her, but after one final night together, she sends him away again.

Colette's marriage to Jouvenel ended in divorce in 1924, due partly to his infidelities and partly to her affair with her 16-year-old stepson, Bertrand de Jouvenel. In 1925, she met Maurice Goudeket, who became her final husband; the couple stayed together until her death.

Colette was by then an established writer (The Vagabond had received three votes for the prestigious Prix Goncourt). The decades of the 1920s and 1930s were her most productive and innovative period. Set mostly in Burgundy or Paris during the Belle Époque, her work focused on married life and sexuality. It was frequently quasi-autobiographical: Chéri (1920) and Le Blé en Herbe (1923) both deal with love between an aging woman and a very young man, a situation reflecting her relationship with Bertrand de Jouvenel and with her third husband, Goudeket, who was 16 years her junior. La Naissance du Jour (1928) is her explicit criticism of the conventional lives of women, expressed through a meditation on age and the renunciation of love by the character of her mother, Sido.

By this time Colette was frequently acclaimed as France's greatest woman writer. "It... has no plot, and yet tells of three lives all that should be known", wrote Janet Flanner of Sido (1929). "Once again, and at greater length than usual, she has been hailed for her genius, humanities and perfect prose by those literary journals which years ago... lifted nothing at all in her direction except the finger of scorn."

During the 1920s she was associated with the Jewish-Algerian writer Elissa Rhaïs, who adopted a Muslim persona to market her novels.

== Last years, 1940–1954 ==
Colette was 67 years old when France was occupied by the Germans. She remained in Paris, in her apartment in the Palais-Royal. Her husband Maurice Goudeket, who was Jewish, was arrested by the Gestapo in December 1941, and although he was released after seven weeks through the intervention of the French wife of the German ambassador, Colette lived through the rest of the war years with the anxiety of a possible second arrest. During the Occupation she produced two volumes of memoirs, Journal à Rebours (1941) and De ma Fenêtre (1942); the two were issued in English in 1975 as Looking Backwards. She wrote lifestyle articles for several pro-Nazi newspapers. These, and her novel Julie de Carneilhan (1941), contain many anti-Semitic slurs.

In 1944, Colette published what became her most famous work, Gigi, which tells the story of the 16-year-old Gilberte ("Gigi") Alvar. Born into a family of demimondaines, Gigi is trained as a courtesan to captivate a wealthy lover but defies the tradition by marrying him instead. In 1949 it was made into a French film starring Danièle Delorme and Gaby Morlay, then in 1951 adapted for the stage with the then-unknown Audrey Hepburn (picked by Colette personally) in the title role. The 1958 Hollywood musical movie, starring Leslie Caron and Louis Jourdan, with a screenplay by Alan Jay Lerner and a score by Lerner and Frederick Loewe, won the Academy Award for Best Picture as well as the other eight Oscars for which it was nominated.

In the postwar years, Colette became a famous public figure. She had become crippled by arthritis and was cared for by Goudeket, who supervised the preparation of her Œuvres Complètes (1948–1950). She continued to write during those years and published L'Etoile Vesper (1946) and Le Fanal Bleu (1949), in which she reflected on the problems of a writer whose inspiration is primarily autobiographical.

=== Nobel Prize in Literature ===
In 1948, Colette was nominated by Claude Farrère, a member of the Académie Française, for the Nobel Prize in Literature. During the deliberations, the Nobel Committee said that "the French writer is moving on a plane where she cannot seriously be considered for a Nobel Prize." Thus, her only nomination was eventually rejected.

== Journalism ==
Colette's first pieces of journalism (1895–1900) were written in collaboration with her husband, Gauthier-Villars—music reviews for La Cocarde, a daily founded by Maurice Barres and a series of pieces for La Fronde. Following her divorce from Gauthier-Villars in 1910, she wrote independently for a wide variety of publications, gaining considerable renown for her articles covering social trends, theater, fashion, and film, as well as crime reporting. In December 1910, Colette agreed to write a regular column in the Paris daily, Le Matin—at first under a pseudonym, then as "Colette Willy." One of her editors was Henry de Jouvenel, whom she married in 1912. By 1912, Colette had taught herself to be a reporter: "You have to see and not invent, you have to touch, not imagine .. because, when you see the sheets [at a crime scene] drenched in fresh blood, they are a color you could never invent." In 1914, Colette was named Le Matin's literary editor. Colette's separation from Jouvenel in 1923 forced her to sever ties with Le Matin. Over the next three decades her articles appeared in over two dozen publications, including Vogue, Le Figaro, and Paris-Soir. During the German Occupation of France, Colette continued contributing to daily and weekly publications, a number of them collaborationist and pro-Nazi, including Le Petit Parisien, which became pro-Vichy after January 1941, and La Gerbe, a pro-Nazi weekly. From 1941 to 1942 she contributed to L'Officiel as an editorial writer. Though her articles were not political in nature, Colette was sharply criticized at the time for lending her prestige to these publications and implicitly accommodating herself to the Vichy regime. Her 26 November 1942 article, "Ma Bourgogne Pauvre" ("My Poor Burgundy"), has been singled out by some historians as tacitly accepting some ultra-nationalist goals that hardline Vichyist writers espoused. After 1945, her journalism was sporadic, and her final pieces were more personal essays than reported stories. Over the course of her writing career, Colette published over 1200 articles for newspapers, magazines, and journals.

== Death and legacy ==
Upon her death, on 3 August 1954, she was refused a religious funeral by the Catholic Church on account of her divorces, but given a state funeral, the first French woman of letters to be granted the honour, and interred in Père-Lachaise cemetery.

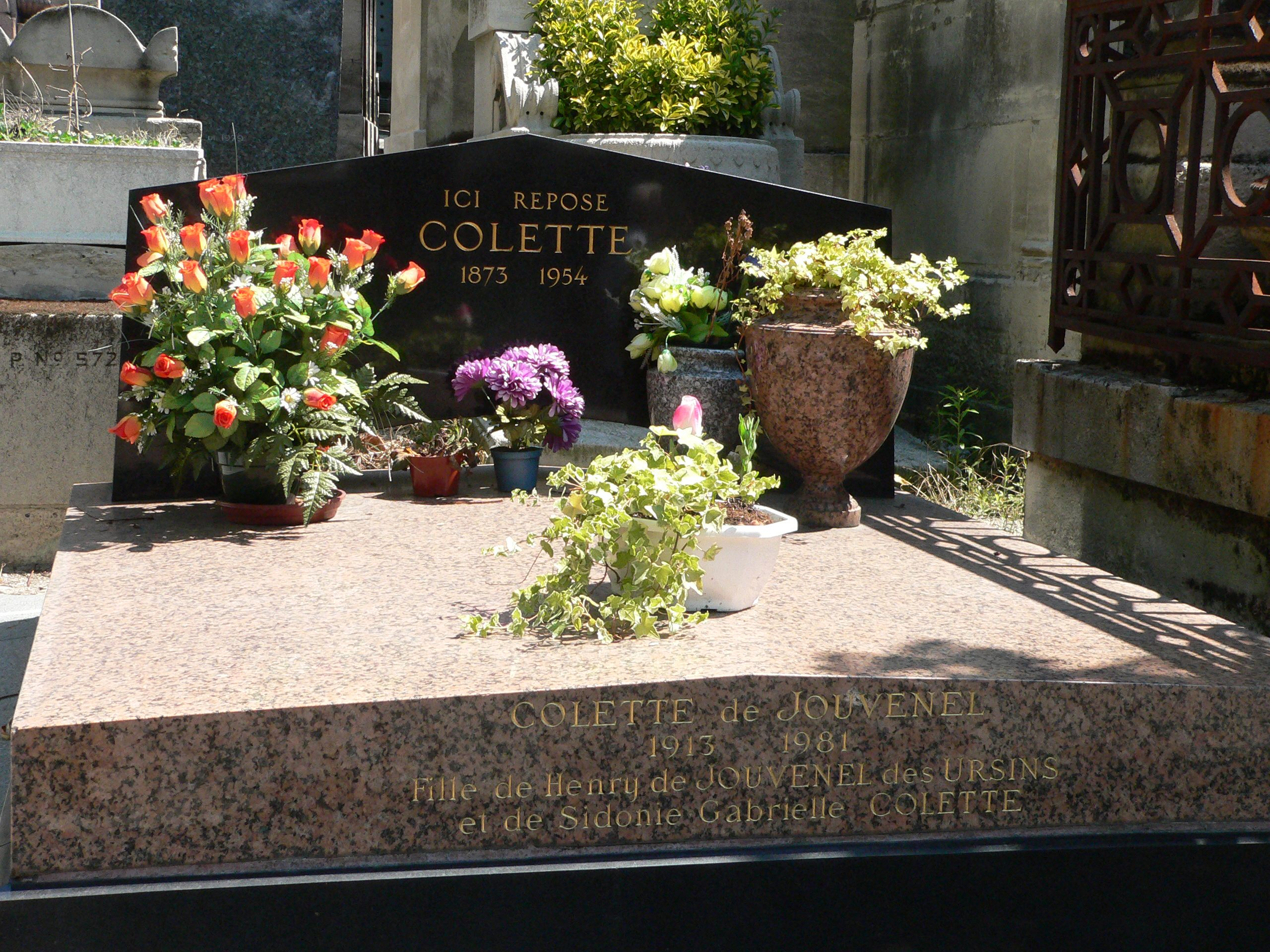
Colette's tomb in Père Lachaise Cemetery.

Colette was elected to the Belgian Royal Academy (1935), the Académie Goncourt (1945, and President in 1949), and a Chevalier (1920) and Grand Officer (1953) of the Légion d'honneur.

Colette's numerous biographers have proposed widely differing interpretations of her life and work over the decades. Initially considered a limited if talented novelist (despite the outspoken admiration in her lifetime of figures such as André Gide and Henry de Montherlant), she has been increasingly recognised as an important voice in women's writing. Before Colette's death, Katherine Anne Porter wrote in The New York Times that Colette "is the greatest living French writer of fiction; and that she was while Gide and Proust still lived."

Liane de Pougy (1869-1950)'s diaries from 1919 to 1941, published as Mes cahiers bleus in French in 1977, and My Blue Notebooks in English in 1979, describe her.

Singer-songwriter Rosanne Cash paid tribute to the writer in the song, "The Summer I Read Colette", on her 1996 album 10 Song Demo.

Truman Capote wrote an essay in 1970 about meeting her, called "The White Rose". It tells how, when she saw him admiring a paperweight on a table (the "white rose" of the title), she insisted he take it; Capote initially refused the gift, but “…when I protested that I couldn’t accept as a present something she so clearly adored, [she replied] 'My dear, really there is no point in giving a gift unless one also treasures it oneself.'”

Womanhouse (30 January – 28 February 1972) was a feminist art installation and performance space organized by Judy Chicago and Miriam Schapiro, co-founders of the California Institute of the Arts (CalArts) Feminist Art Program, and was the first public exhibition of art centered upon female empowerment. One of the rooms in it, Leah's Room by Karen LeCocq and Nancy Youdelman, was based on Colette’s Chéri. Karen and Nancy borrowed an antique dressing table and rug, made lace curtains and covered the bed with satin and lace to create the effect of a boudoir. They filled the closet with old-looking clothes and veiled hats, and wallpapered the walls to add a feeling of nostalgia. LeCocq sat at the dressing table dressed in a nineteenth-century-style costume as Léa, studiously applying make-up over and over and then removing it, replicating the character’s attempts to save her fading beauty.

"Lucette Stranded on the Island" by Julia Holter, from her 2015 album Have You in My Wilderness, is based on a minor character from Colette's short story Chance Acquaintances.

In the 1991 film Becoming Colette, Colette is played by the French actress Mathilda May. In the 2018 film Colette, the title character is played by Keira Knightley. Both films focus on Colette's life in her twenties, her marriage to her first husband, and the publication of her first novels under his name.

== Notable works ==
- Claudine à l'école (1900, translated as Claudine at School)
- Claudine à Paris (1901, translated as Claudine in Paris)
- Claudine en ménage (1902, translated as Claudine Married)
- Claudine s'en va (1903, translated as Claudine and Annie)
- Dialogues de bêtes (1904)
- La Retraite sentimentale (1907)
- Les Vrilles de la vigne (1908)
- La Vagabonde (1910)
- L'Envers du music hall (1913)
- L'Entrave (1913, translated as The Shackle)
- La Paix chez les bêtes (1916)
- L'Enfant et les sortilèges (1917, Ravel opera libretto)
- Mitsou (1919)
- Chéri (1920)
- La Maison de Claudine (1922, translated as The House of Claudine)
- L'Autre Femme (1922, translated as The Other Woman)
- Le Blé en herbe (1923, translated as Ripening Seed)
- La Fin de Chéri (1926, translated as The Last of Chéri or The End of Chéri)
- La Naissance du jour (1928, translated as Break of Day)
- Sido (1929)
- La Seconde (1929, translated as The Other One)
- Le Pur et l'Impur (1932, translated as The Pure and the Impure)
- La Chatte (1933)
- Duo (1934)
- Julie de Carneilhan (1941)
- Le Képi (1943)
- Gigi (1944)
- Paris de ma fenêtre (1944)
- L'Étoile Vesper (1946)
- Le Fanal Bleu (1949, translated as The Blue Lantern)
- Paradis terrestre, with photographs by Izis Bidermanas (1953)

== Filmography ==
- La Vagabonde, directed by Solange Térac (France, 1932, based on the novel The Vagabond)
- Claudine à l'école, directed by Serge de Poligny (France, 1937, based on the novel Claudine at School)
- Gigi, directed by Jacqueline Audry (France, 1949, based on the novella Gigi)
- Julie de Carneilhan, directed by Jacques Manuel (France, 1950, based on the novel Julie de Carneilhan)
- Minne (film), directed by Jacqueline Audry (France, 1950, based on the novel L'Ingénue libertine)
- Chéri, directed by Pierre Billon (France, 1950, based on the novel Chéri)
- Le Blé en herbe, directed by Claude Autant-Lara (France, 1954, based on the novel Green Wheat)
- Mitsou, directed by Jacqueline Audry (France, 1956, based on the novella Mitsou)
- NBC Matinee Theater: The Vagabond (1958, TV series episode, based on the novel The Vagabond)
- Gigi, directed by Vincente Minnelli (1958, based on the novella Gigi)
- Chéri, directed by François Chatel (France, 1962, TV film, based on the novel Chéri)
- The Gentle Libertine or How Young Girls Grow Wise, directed by Robert Kitts (UK, 1967, TV film, based on the novel L'Ingénue libertine)
- Away from It All: The Ripening Seed, directed by Mischa Scorer (UK, 1973, TV series episode, based on the novel Green Wheat)
- Chéri, directed by Claude Whatham (UK, 1973, TV miniseries, based on the novel Chéri)
- La Seconde, directed by Hervé Bromberger (France, 1973, TV film, based on the novel La Seconde)
- Claudine, directed by Édouard Molinaro (France, 1978, TV miniseries, based on the Claudine novels)
- La Naissance du jour, directed by Jacques Demy (France, 1980, TV film, based on the novel Break of Day)
- Emmenez-moi au théâtre: Chéri, directed by Yves-André Hubert (France, 1984, TV series episode, based on the novel Chéri)
- Gigi, directed by Jeannette Hubert (France, 1987, TV film, based on the novella Gigi)
- Julie de Carneilhan, directed by Christopher Frank (France, 1990, TV film, based on the novel Julie de Carneilhan)
- Le Blé en herbe, directed by Serge Meynard (France, 1990, TV film, based on the novel Green Wheat)
- La Seconde, directed by Christopher Frank (France, 1990, TV film, based on the novel La Seconde)
- Duo, directed by Claude Santelli (France, 1990, TV film, based on the novel Duo)
- Bella Vista, directed by Alfredo Arias (France, 1992, TV film, based on the short story Bella-Vista)
- Mademoiselle Gigi, directed by Caroline Huppert (France, 2006, TV film, based on the novella Gigi)
- Chéri, directed by Stephen Frears (UK, 2009, based on the novel Chéri)

=== Screenwriter ===
- 1934: Lake of Ladies (dir. Marc Allégret)
- 1935: Divine (dir. Max Ophüls)

=== Films about Colette ===
- Colette, directed by Yannick Bellon (France, 1952, short documentary)
- Becoming Colette, directed by Danny Huston (1991), with Mathilda May as Colette
- Colette, une femme libre, directed by Nadine Trintignant (France, 2004, TV film), with Marie Trintignant as Colette
- Colette, directed by Wash Westmoreland (2018), with Keira Knightley as Colette
- Colette, l'insoumise, directed by Cécile Denjean (France, 2018, documentary)

== See also ==
- Le Monde's 100 Books of the Century, a list which includes Les Vrilles de la vigne
- Mononymous persons
