= Green Wheat =

1923 French novel

First edition

Green Wheat (French: Le Blé en herbe) is a 1923 novel by the French writer Colette. The book was written during the vacation of the writer on her property Roz-Ven in Saint-Coulomb, between Saint-Malo and Cancale.

== Plot ==
Phil and Vinca meet every year during the summer holidays in Brittany. They have always been interested in each other, but Phil meets a woman who introduces him to carnal love. Vinca feels the betrayal of her friend.

The most recent English translation of the novel (2004) is Green Wheat, translated by Zack Rogow, nominated for the PEN/Book-of-the-Month Club Translation Award. Earlier translations were (1931) by Phyllis Mérgoz entitled The Ripening Corn; (1932) by Ida Zeitlin (1902-?) entitled The Ripening; (1955) by Roger Senhouse entitled Ripening Seed.

== Screen adaptations ==
- 1954: Le Blé en herbe (English title: The Game of Love), film by Claude Autant-Lara, with: Edwige Feuillère, Pierre-Michel Beck, Nicole Berger, Robert Berri and Louis de Funès;
- 1973: The Ripening Seed (Away from It All, ер.1), BBC television series directed by Mischa Scorer, with John Moulder-Brown, Lynne Frederick, Gayle Hunnicutt;
- 1990: Le Blé en herbe, TV movie directed by Serge Meynard, with Isabelle Carré, Sophie Aubry, Matthieu Rozé and Marianne Basler.
