= Cambridge House (organisation) =

Cambridge House logo

Cambridge House (Cambridge House and Talbot) is a voluntary organisation in Southwark, London.

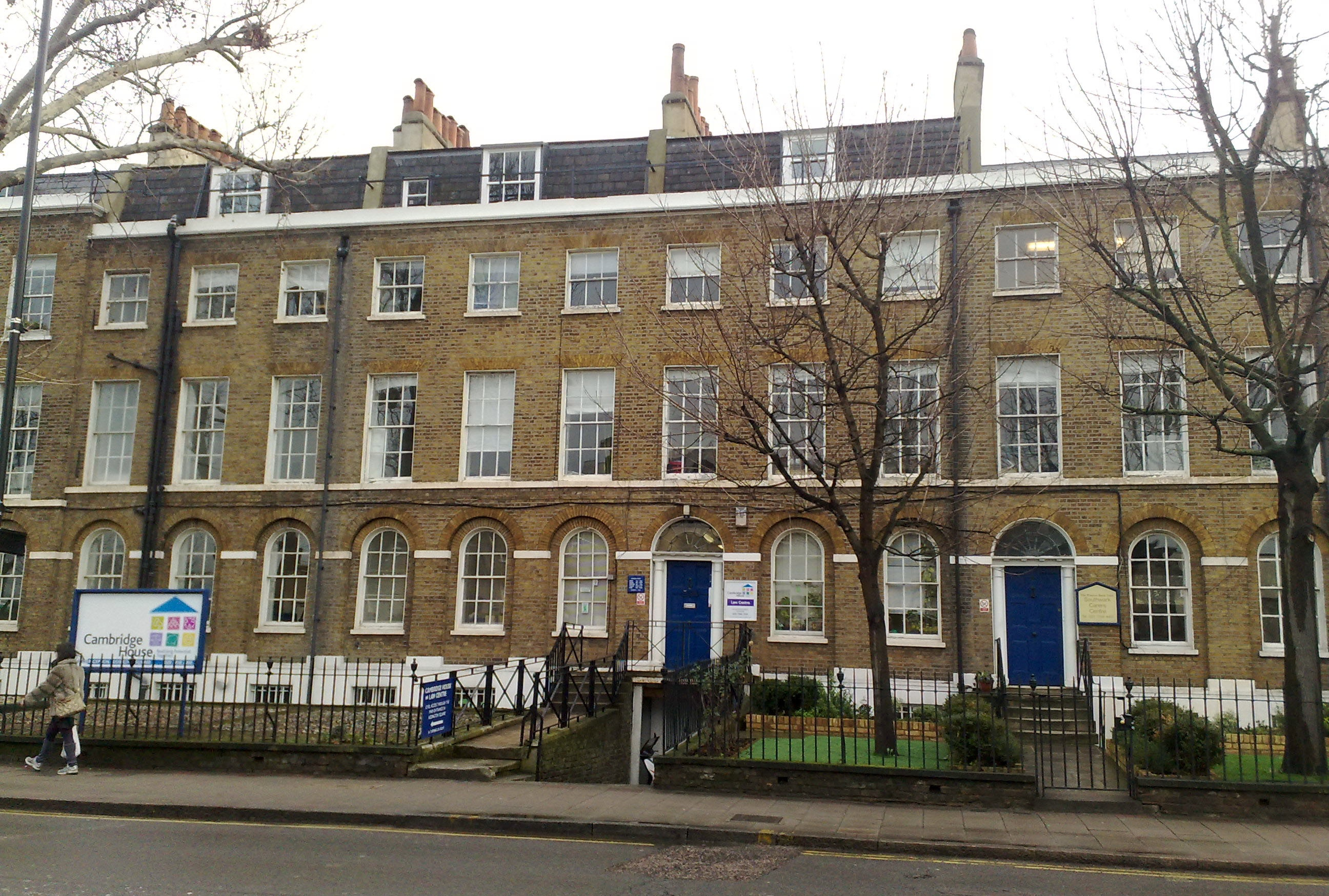
Cambridge House in 2010

The charity’s mission is to tackle poverty and promote social justice, providing specialist services supporting individuals with multiple and complex needs. Cambridge House offers a variety of direct and indirect services to residents of Southwark and the wider London area. Direct services include free legal advice & representation and professional advocacy. Cambridge House also provides arts & sports services for people with disabilities, youth empowerment projects, and 'Sports for Social Justice' programmes. Cambridge House's indirect services promote social innovation and systemic change through research and knowledge exchange, and by providing work and service spaces to other charities and civil society organisations.

Cambridge House is a founder member of Locality and International Federation of Settlements, and part of a national and international networks of building-based and community-asset owned practitioners tackling poverty. The charity particularly focuses on tackling multiple deprivation, working to break cycles of disadvantage and crisis by providing a portfolio of specialist services which tackle the network of risk factors which maintain poverty and social marginalisation.

Operating from a refurbished Grade II listed building in Walworth, the charity houses a number of other charities and community groups. In the financial year 2014-15, the charity's work reached 105,000 people.

== History ==
Cambridge House began life in 1889 as part of the Settlement Movement. Founded by graduates and undergraduates from Trinity College, Cambridge and Magdalene College, Cambridge, it was set up to tackle poverty and deprivation in the poorest parts of South London. By 1897 Cambridge University as a whole was involved.

University graduates and undergraduates lived at Cambridge House and performed voluntary work for the local Southwark community. Settlement residents were involved with the direct relief of poverty, including "the provision of country holidays for city children; the organisation of boys clubs; educational and recreational activities; a free legal service; involvement in a range of public bodies." In 1900 a women's settlement called Talbot was established nearby, focussed on helping women and children. The organisations merged in 1972, becoming Cambridge House and Talbot. The organisation is still legally named as such.

In 1894 Cambridge House established the UK’s first free legal advice service (now called the Law Centre). In the early 20th century, the organisation established the UK’s first Labour Exchange. In the 1930s, Cambridge House began providing skills workshops for the unemployed. In 1963 the organisation established the first Adult Literacy Scheme, which led to the Right to Read Campaign for adults.

In 2015, the Supreme Court ruled in favour of Cambridge House Law Centre's client in Kanu (Appellant) v Southwark London Borough Council. The case was significant regarding the rights of vulnerable homeless people to housing. The Court overturned previous case law and guidance and established that:

1. An authority’s duty to the homeless under Part VII Housing Act 1996 is not to be influenced or affected by the resources available to the authority.
2. The correct comparator when assessing whether someone is vulnerable for the reasons in s189 (1)(c ) is an ordinary person if made homeless.
3. Support from a third party can be taken into account when assessing whether a person is vulnerable but that needs to be applied with “considerable circumspection” and that the fact of support in itself is not enough.
4. In the case of an applicant who has or may have a disability then at each stage of the decision making process the decision maker must have due regard to the need to achieve the goals of the Equality Act 2010 which include the need to eliminate discrimination, advance the equality of opportunity between those that have a disability and those that do not and to take active steps to meet the needs of those with a disability. S149 (1) (a)- ( c) Equality Act 2010.
5. That the consideration of the public sector equality duty must be exercised “in substance, with rigour and with an open mind”.

== Services & Activities ==
Cambridge House's services fall into the following areas:

- Professional advocacy
- Law Centre
- Youth Empowerment
- Sports & Arts projects for individuals with disabilities

Cambridge House also operates a social enterprise providing work and service space to charities and other civil society organisations.

== Notable Staff & Patrons ==
Prince Richard, Duke of Gloucester - President

Rowan Williams, Lord Williams of Oystermouth - Patron

Jeremiah Emmanuel - Patron

Karin Woodley - Chief Executive (2013–Present)
