= Colette de Jouvenel =

French producer

Colette de Jouvenel (French pronunciation: [kɔlɛt də ʒuvnɛl]), also known as Bel-Gazou, ([bɛl ɡazu]; 3 July 1913 – 1981) was a French producer of animated films.

She was the daughter of French writer Colette and her second husband, Henri de Jouvenel. She was the half-sister of Renaud de Jouvenel and Bertrand de Jouvenel. Her daughter resides in Beaumont du Gatinais, a village about 100 miles southeast of Paris, and desired to open an antiques and decorating shop in the village.

Born at Castel-Novel in Corrèze, she spent her childhood in the care of her English nanny, Miss Draper, only rarely seeing her famous mother.

In 1935, Colette de Jouvenel married Dr. Dausse. She would leave her husband two months later and divorce the following year, in 1936. After this short-lived marriage, she had affairs with several women, notably with Nicole Stéphane.

She produced an animated film for Office de Radiodiffusion Télévision Française, entitled Introduction à Colette. It premiered 18 March 1968.

She is buried next to her mother at Père Lachaise in Paris.
