= Jacques Manuel =

- Born: 3 September 1897; Paris, France
- Died: 21 April 1968 (aged 70); Paris, France
- Occupations: Costume designer, Director, Editor
- Years active: 1926-1950 (film)

Jacques Manuel (1897–1968) was a French costume designer and occasional film editor and director.

== Selected filmography ==
=== Costume designer ===
- La Route impériale (1935)
- Woman of Malacca (1937)
- The Citadel of Silence (1937)
- Adrienne Lecouvreur (1938)
- Three Waltzes (1938)
- Vautrin the Thief (1943)
- The Captain (1946)

=== Editor ===
- The New Men (1936)
- The Woman Thief (1938)
- La Comédie du bonheur (1940)

=== Director ===
- Julie de Carneilhan (1950)

== Bibliography ==
- Goble, Alan. The Complete Index to Literary Sources in Film. Walter de Gruyter, 1999.
