= Urquhart (surname) =

Scottish surname list of people

- Pronunciation: /ˈɜːrkərt/ UR-kərt

Origin
- Language: Brittonic
- Meaning: 1. "the portion of the shot" 2. "on", "by" and "thicket"
- Region of origin: Scotland

Other names
- Variant forms: Urchardan; Uhrchardan

Urquhart (/ˈɜːrkərt/ UR-kərt; Scots: Urchart [ˈʌrxərt]) is a Scottish surname. It is a habitational name, that can be derived from any of four places with the name. Other places named Urquhart, including one by Loch Ness, are derived from the Brythonic elements ar, meaning "on", "by"; and cardden, meaning "thicket". The Scottish Gaelic form of the surname is Urchardan.

== Notable people with the surname ==
=== Academics ===
- Alasdair Urquhart (born 1945) Scottish professor of philosophy and scientist
- Francis Fortescue Urquhart (1868–1934), English academic

=== Arts ===
- Felicity Urquhart (born 1976), Australian country music singer-songwriter
- Isabelle Urquhart (1865–1907), American stage actress and contralto
- Mary Cora Urquhart (1859–1936), American actress
- Molly Urquhart (1906–1977), Scottish actress
- Murray Urquhart (1880–1972), British artist
- Philippa Urquhart, British actress
- Robert Urquhart (1922–1995), British actor
- Tony Urquhart (1934–2022), Canadian artist

=== Business ===
- A. William Urquhart, American lawyer, partner in Quinn Emanuel Urquhart & Sullivan
- Alistair Urquhart (1919–2016), Scottish businessman and author
- David Urquhart, Baron Tayside (1912–1975), Scottish businessman
- Diane Urquhart, Canadian financial analyst
- Lawrence Urquhart (1935–2025), Scottish businessman
- Leslie Urquhart (1874–1933), Scottish mining entrepreneur
- William Muir Urquhart (1855–1933), American businessman

=== Clergy ===
- Colin Urquhart (1940–2021), British evangelical and neocharismatic Christian leader
- David Urquhart (bishop) (born 1952), Anglican Bishop of Birmingham

=== Government ===
- Brian Urquhart (1919–2021), British civil servant, United Nations official
- Frederic Urquhart (1858–1935), Australian police commissioner
- John Urquhart (sheriff) (born 1947), American sheriff
- Margery Urquhart (1912–2007) Chilean-born British deputy director of Social Work, first female Special Branch agent

=== Military ===
- Ronald Urquhart (1906–1968), British Army officer
- Roy Urquhart (1901–1988), British Army general

=== Politics ===
- Alexander Urquhart (died 1727), Scottish politician
- Anne Urquhart (born 1957), Australian politician
- Carl Urquhart, Canadian politician
- David Urquhart (1805–1877), Member of Parliament, Scottish diplomat, writer
- Diane Colley-Urquhart, Canadian politician
- Don Urquhart (1848–1911), Australian politician
- Duncan Urquhart (politician), (died 1792), British politician
- Earl Wallace Urquhart (1921–1971), Canadian politician
- Elias L. Urquhart (1846–1934), American politician
- James Urquhart (1822–1901), American politician
- Jean Urquhart (born 1949), Scottish politician
- John Urquhart (Canadian politician) (1844–1933), Canadian politician and physician
- Martin Luther Urquhart (1883–1961), Canadian politician
- Stephen H. Urquhart (born 1965), American politician
- Thomas Urquhart (Canadian politician) (1858–1931)
- William Pollard-Urquhart (1815–1871), Irish politician and writer

=== Science and technology ===
- Feargus Urquhart (born 1970), American video game developer and CEO of Obsidian Entertainment
- Fred Urquhart (1911–2002), Canadian zoologist
- George Macdonald Urquhart (1925–1997), Scottish parasitologist
- Roderick B. Urquhart, mathematician and namesake of the Urquhart Graph

=== Sports ===
- Billy Urquhart (born 1956), Scottish football player
- Donna Urquhart (born 1986), Australian squash player
- Duncan Urquhart (footballer) (1908–1956), Scottish football player
- Fiona Urquhart (born 1987), Scottish cricketer
- Gavin Urquhart (born 1988), Australian rules football player
- George Urquhart (born 1950), Scottish footballer
- John Urquhart (cricketer) (1921–2003), English cricketer
- Johnny Urquhart (1925–2008), Scottish football player and administrator
- Max Urquhart (born 1942), Australian rules football player
- Mike Urquhart (1958-2023), Canadian ice hockey player, coach, and manager
- Stuart Urquhart (born 1995), Scottish footballer

=== Writers and journalists ===
- Fred Urquhart (writer) (1912–1995), Scottish author
- Ian Urquhart, Canadian journalist and newspaper editor
- Jane Urquhart (born 1949), Canadian author
- Jeannie Urquhart, known as Georgie Raoul-Duval (1866–1913), author, lover of Colette and Colette's husband Henry Gauthier-Villars
- Jessie Urquhart (1890–1948), Australian journalist and novelist
- Paul Urquhart (1877–1940) pseudonym for author Ladbroke Black
- Thomas Urquhart (1611–1660), Scottish writer, translator of Rabelais

=== Other ===
- Augusta W. Urquhart (1870-1960), American social leader and clubwoman

== Fictional characters with the surname ==
- Abby Urquhart, character in Howards Way television show
- Dr. Ethan Urquhart, titular character in Lois McMaster Bujold's novel Ethan of Athos
- Francis Urquhart, a character in the House of Cards trilogy by Michael Dobbs and its adaptation into a BBC television series
- Gerald Urquhart, character in Howards' Way television show
- Gordon Urquhart, character in the 1983 film Local Hero
- Sir Hector Gore-Urquhart, character in the 1957 film Lucky Jim
- Julius Gore-Urquhart, character in the 2003 ITV film Lucky Jim
- Uncle Gore-Urquhart, wealthy philanthropist in Kingsley Amis' novel Lucky Jim
- Norman Urquhart, character in Dorothy Sayers' mystery novel Strong Poison
- Polly Urquhart, character in Howards Way television show
- Stella Urquhart, character in the 1983 film Local Hero
- Urquhart, a student of Hogwarts and captain of the Slytherin Quidditch team in the book Harry Potter and the Half-Blood Prince

== See also ==
- Clan Urquhart
