= Middle East Treaty Organization =

London-based non-governmental organization

- Abbreviation: METO
- Formation: 2017; 9 years ago
- Founded at: London, England
- Type: Non-profit international campaign
- Headquarters: London
- Fields: Weapons of Mass Destruction
- Executive director: Sharon Dolev
- Website: www.wmd-free.me

The Middle East Treaty Organization (METO) is a non-governmental organization founded in 2017 by a coalition of civil-society activists and disarmament practitioners, with the aim to rid the Middle East of all weapons of mass destruction (WMD). This proposal is in line with the 1970s proposal for a Middle East nuclear weapon free zone, albeit with broader scope following the 1990 Mubarak Initiative to include chemical and biological as well as nuclear weapons.

Working toward the broader vision of regional security and peace, METO defines its purpose as the establishment of a zone free of weapons of mass destruction (WMDFZ) in the Middle East. To achieve that end, the organization embraces a traditional treaty-based approach relying on diplomatic mechanisms and civil society campaigns. This strategy is supported through programming and events centered around policy debates, advocacy and education.

Three strategic pillars underlie METO's treaty-based approach for achieving the Middle East WMDFZ:

- A WMDFZ Treaty, based on a text negotiated, agreed and adopted by regional governments and relevant stakeholders through an inclusive, multilateral track I and track II diplomatic process facilitated by METO and partner organizations (including formal United Nations negotiations).
- A regional organization, which must be established to oversee and carry out functions necessary to the treaty's eventual implementation, verification and compliance.
- Engagement with civil society, in particular to foster a civil society movement that can formulate demands to regional and international governments to advance the goals of the proposed treaty.

METO is an international partner of International Campaign to Abolish Nuclear Weapons, International Physicians for the Prevention of Nuclear War, Geneva Centre for Security Policy, British American Security Information Council, Abolition 2000, and Geneva Disarmament Platform.

== Draft Treaty and Annual UN Conferences ==
METO began facilitating the creation of a draft treaty text that would form the basis for discussion on a WMDFZ Treaty in 2017 through track 1.5-2 diplomacy. Roundtable negotiations to discuss the treaty were organized among senior diplomatic and former diplomatic figures from regional governments and representatives from international organizations, as well as subject experts.

The draft treaty text facilitated by METO's process was brought to the United Nations General Assembly by Egypt on 22 December 2018, alongside a proposal to launch an annual conference to discuss the zone. The UN General Assembly resolved to convene an annual meeting on the establishment of a Middle East WMDFZ.

The first annual conference was held from 18 November to 22 November 2019 at UN Headquarters in New York, presided over by the UN Permanent Representative from Jordan. Almost all states of the region attended the conference, including the 22 members of the Arab League and Iran, as well as four nuclear-armed states China, France, Russia, and the United Kingdom, alongside other observer states and international organizations. The only regional country that did not participate was Israel.

The conference adopted a Final Report and Political Declaration articulating the participating member states' commitment to pursue the elaboration of a consensus-based, legally binding treaty to establish a WMDFZ in the Middle East through an open and inclusive process involving all states in the region. They agreed to meet again from 16 to 20 November 2020. That meeting was postponed until 29 November – 3 December 2021 because of COVID.

The third conference was held 14–18 November 2022. The fourth was held 13 to 17 November 2023, with the fifth scheduled for 18 to 22 November 2024.

A description of all conferences held to date and planned is available from the website of the United Nations Office for Disarmament Affairs (UNODA).

== METO in Publications and Media ==
As part of the organization's education and advocacy programs, METO staff frequently contribute articles to academic publications and mainstream media outlets, as well as through film, radio and podcast productions.

=== Articles ===
- Emad Kiyaei, Tony Robinson, Sharon Dolev, “Non-proliferation and Regional Cooperation in the Middle East,” Brown Journal of World Affairs, January 2021.
- Tariq Rauf, "Achieving the Possible: “Weapons of Mass Destruction Free Zone in the Middle East”", Inter Press Service, November 2019.
- Sharon Dolev, Emad Kiyaei, and Dina Saadallah, "Achieving the Possible: a WMD-free zone in the Middle East", Reaching Critical Will, November 2019.
- Paul Ingram and Emad Kiyaei, "Middle East WMD-Free Zone: Thinking the Possible", The Cairo Review of Global Affairs, Fall 2019.
- UN Office for Disarmament Affairs, "A Draft Treaty for a WMD Free Zone in the Middle East: Time to Envisage the Practical", UNODA, October 2017.

=== Reports ===
- METO and GCSP, Round Table report on the Abraham Accords and WMDFZ, January 2021.
- Sharon Dolev, “Israel”, in Assuring destruction forever: 2020 edition, Reaching Critical Will, June 2020.

=== Book ===
- Emad Kiyaei and Seyed Hossein Mousavian, A Middle East Free of Weapons of Mass Destruction, Routledge, April 2020.

=== Documentary film ===
- Tony Robinson and Álvaro Orús, documentary film: "The Beginning of the End of Nuclear Weapons", Pressenza IPA, May 2019.

=== Podcast ===
The organization produces a fortnightly podcast series, In The Zone, which explores constructive approaches to improve the chances of achieving a WMDFZ in the Middle East. In the series, Paul Ingram and Anahita Parsa conduct interviews with WMD disarmament experts on technical and political solutions to overcome obstacles, how to build trust between countries and more broadly how to improve peace and security for people in the region. The podcast series is published on Pressenza and available on SoundCloud.
