= Paul Ingram =

Paul Ingram may refer to:

- Paul Ingram (nuclear disarmament expert)
- Paul Ingram, principal in the Thurston County ritual abuse case
