= Robert Urquhart =

Robert Urquhart may refer to:

- Robert Urquhart (actor) (1922–1995), Scottish character actor
- Sir Robert Urquhart (diplomat) (1896–1983), British diplomat
- Roy Urquhart (Robert Elliott Urquhart, 1901–1988), British Army general

== See also ==
- Urquhart (surname)
