= Comfort Ero =

President and CEO of International Crisis Group

Comfort Ekhuase Ero CMG
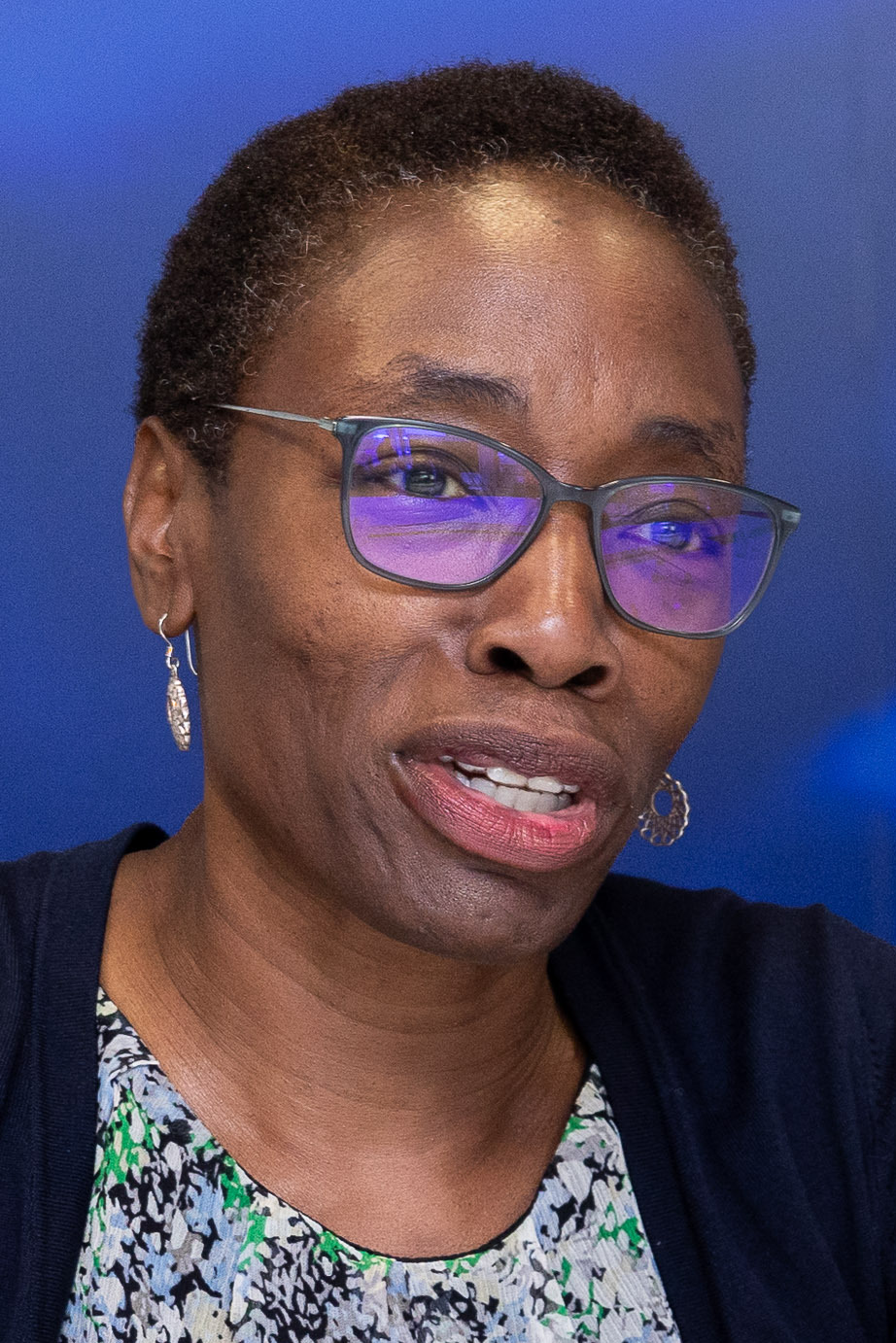
- Ero in 2022
- Born: 1969 (aged 57); UK
- Education: London School of Economics
- Scientific career
- Workplaces: International Crisis Group; King's College London
- Thesis: The evolution of norms in international relations : intervention and the principle of non-intervention in intra-African affairs (1999)

Comfort Ekhuase Ero CMG (born 1969) is a British analyst, policymaker and the president of the think-tank International Crisis Group. Her research has focused on peacekeeping and international relations in conflict-ridden countries. Alongside her work in international diplomacy, Ero is committed to making peace-building more representative and inclusive. She was awarded the 2023 Sir Brian Urquhart Award for Distinguished Service to the United Nations.

== Early life and education ==
Ero was born in England to Nigerian parents. After completing their university degrees in the United Kingdom, Ero's parents could not return to Nigeria because of the Biafra Civil War.

Ero moved to Lagos when she was two years old, where she lived until primary school. She lived with her uncle on the campus of the University of Lagos. She has credited her father and uncle with her decision to pursue an academic career.

Ero earned her doctorate at the London School of Economics, where she studied interventions in intra-African affairs. Specifically, her focus was on the post-colonial states that emerged in 1957, and how international relations evolved during independence and the Cold war. She found that interventionist and non-interventionist practise represented a balance between dealing with short-term contingencies and long-term security. During her doctorate, she completed an internship at the United Nations Association – UK, which inspired her to work in policymaking and international diplomacy.

After earning her doctorate she moved to King's College London as a research associate in the Conflict, Security and Development Group, which was supported by the Department for International Development. She moved to the International Institute for Strategic Studies in 1998. She was a researcher in Freetown during the Sierra Leone Civil War.

== Career ==
Ero joined Crisis Group in 2001 as West Africa Project Director. In 2004, she moved to the United Nations, where she spent three years as the Political Affairs Officer and Policy Advisor to the Special Representative of the Secretary-General in Liberia. The United Nations Mission in Liberia helped Liberia recover in the aftermath of the decade-long civil war and implement their peace agreement. Here she explored the challenges multilateral agencies face when creating policy. In 2008 she moved to the International Center for Transitional Justice, where she was responsible for the Africa Program.

Ero joined the advisory board of the Royal United Services Institute in 2020. In 2021, she returned to Crisis Group as the Interim Vice President. She was made the organisation's president and CEO in December 2021. She was the first Black woman to lead the organisation. Crisis Group conducts field research, analysis and advocacy to help policymakers prevent and resolve conflict. She was awarded the Sir Brian Urquhart Award for Distinguished Service to the United Nations in 2023.

== Select publications ==
- Alao, Abiodun; Ero, Comfort (2001). "Cut short for taking short cuts: The Lomé peace agreement on Sierra Leone". Civil Wars. 4 (3): 117–134. doi:10.1080/13698240108402481. ISSN 1369-8249.
- Ero, Comfort; Long, Suzanne (1995). "Humanitarian intervention: A new role for the United Nations?". International Peacekeeping. 2 (2): 140–156. doi:10.1080/13533319508413548. ISSN 1353-3312.
- Ero, Comfort (2001). "A critical assessment of Britain's Africa policy". Conflict, Security & Development. 1 (2): 51–71. doi:10.1080/14678800100590608. ISSN 1467-8802.
