= Dolev (surname) =

Dolev is a surname. Notable people with the surname include:

- Danny Dolev, Israeli computer scientist
  - Dolev–Yao model used in cryptographic protocols
- Sharon Dolev, Israeli activist
- Shlomi Dolev (born 1958), Israeli computer scientist
