= Brown-Potter =

Brown-Potter may refer to:

- Cora Urquhart Brown-Potter (1857–1936), one of the first American society women to take to the stage
- Robert Brown Potter (1829–1887), United States lawyer and a Union Army general in the American Civil War
