= The Fortune (TV series) =

British television series

- Genre: Drama
- Screenplay by: Aschlin Ditta
- Directed by: Andy de Emmony
- Starring: Eleanor Tomlinson; Matthew Lewis; Rebecca Front; James Younger; Denis Lawson; Callum Woodhouse; Stephen Tompkinson; Paula Wilcox; Danielle Walters; Nina Wadia
- Country of origin: United Kingdom
- Original language: English
- No. of series: 1
- No. of episodes: 4

Production
- Executive producers: Jonathan Ford; Will Stapley
- Producers: Lesley Douglas; Ellie Hill
- Running time: 47 minutes
- Production company: Lonesome Pine Productions

Original release
- Network: 5
- Release: 2 June – 10 June 2026

The Fortune is a British television psychological drama television series on 5. It stars Eleanor Tomlinson and Matthew Lewis.

== Premise ==
A married mother's settled life is thrown into turmoil after she is told she is receiving an inheritance from someone she has never previously heard of.

== Cast ==
- Eleanor Tomlinson as Amanda Blakefield
- Matthew Lewis as Jimmy Brent
- Rebecca Front as Fiona Worrall
- James Younger as Luke Blakefield
- Denis Lawson as Martin Worrall
- Callum Woodhouse as Anthony Worrall
- Stephen Tompkinson as Boots Maddison
- Paula Wilcox as Linda Blakefield
- Danielle Walters as Sandy
- Nina Wadia as Laura Mistry

== Production ==
The four-part series is written by Aschlin Ditta and directed by Andy de Emmony. It is produced by Lonesome Pine Productions in association with Sphere Abacus and North East Screen. Producers include Lesley Douglas and Ellie Hill. Executive producers include Jonathan Ford and Will Stapley.

The cast is led by Eleanor Tomlinson and Matthew Lewis, as well as Denis Lawson, Rebecca Front, Stephen Tompkinson, Paula Wilcox, James Younger and Nina Wadia.

Filming took place in Hartlepool in October 2025.

== Broadcast ==
The series starting airing on 5 in the United Kingdom on 2 June 2026.
