= Sharon Dolev =

Israeli anti-nuclear activist

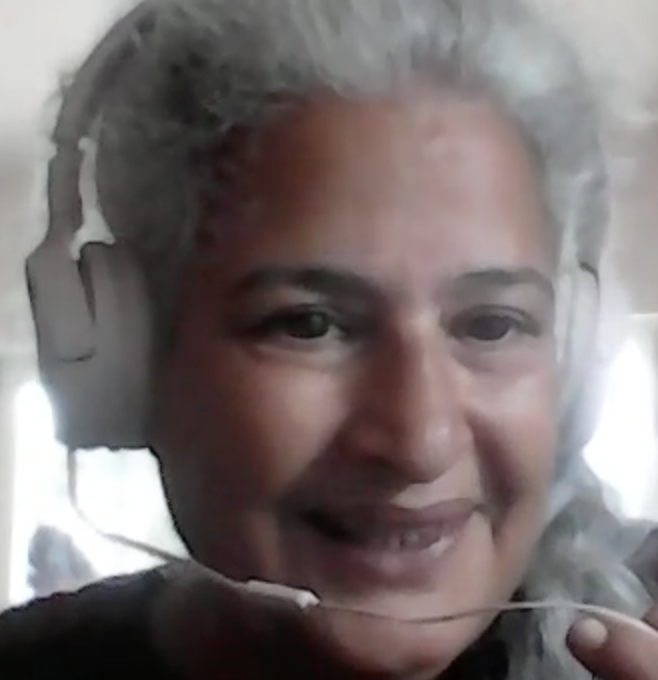
- Website: www.wmd-free.me/menu/people/

Sharon Dolev (Hebrew: שרון דולב) is an Israeli peace and human rights activist focusing on eliminating weapons of mass destruction from the Middle East. She does this through innovations in education, advocacy and activism to change public policies. She is the founder and director of the Israeli Disarmament Movement (IDM) and a co-founder and executive director of the Middle East Treaty Organization (METO). She also worked for a time with the International Campaign to Abolish Nuclear Weapons (ICAN), which won the Nobel Peace Prize in 2017.

== Activism ==
Dolev began working for Greenpeace in Israel in 2007.

In October 2022, she was elected to the Council of the International Peace Bureau (IPB) for her advocacy of eradicating "nuclear and other weapons of mass destruction from the Middle East through innovative policy, education, advocacy and activism."

== Israeli disarmament movement ==
Dolev is the founder of the Israeli Disarmament Movement, a constituent member of the International Campaign to Abolish Nuclear Weapons. Dolev said that when she hands out fliers, some people "ask me not to speak. They think the fact that I speak is putting Israel in danger.” She was asked, "What is it like to be a woman and do this work, especially in the Middle East and in such a militaristic Israeli culture?" She replied, "I am taking part in various meetings with various people. It takes time until my position is even considered a legit one to talk about. This is both because I am a woman and because I am talking about the impossible. My biggest frustration is organizing panels that I myself would boycott because there is no representation for women. This frustration always exists. When will I stop being a woman and start being someone who talks about nuclear weapons?"

In 2010, the Palestine-Israel Journal featured an article by Dolev on "Creating an Anti-Nuclear Movement in Israel". This article describes "a new Israeli grassroots anti-nuclear movement" and a series of events they organized in Israel on this topic. However, this 2010 article did not provide a name for this movement.

In 2016 the Israeli Disarmament Movement and 100 citizens of Israel petitioned Israel's High Court of Justice "to compel the secretive Israel Atomic Energy Commission (IAEC) to become more transparent through broad Knesset legislation." The Jerusalem Post quoted Dolev as having said, "The ambiguity typifying the work of the Israel Atomic Energy Commission has become dangerous in itself for Israeli citizens." The petitioners included Avner Cohen, a leading expert on Israel's nuclear program. He said that the petitioners had been working on this for roughly a year and filed it "only weeks after" numerous reports appeared in the press "that the reactor southeast of Dimona has 1,537 cracks." The petitioners agreed that some secrecy was required, but the IAEC should nevertheless be subject to some oversight by the Knesset.

In 2017 IDM - as part of the International Campaign to Abolish Nuclear Weapons (ICAN) was awarded the nobel Peace Price. In Israel the fact that IDM and Dolev as part of ICAN were awarded the Nobel Prize was barely reported on in national media.

A 12 October 2017 publication by the United Nations Office for Disarmament Affairs (UNODA) said, 'the Permanent Mission of Ireland to the United Nations, in conjunction with the British American Security Information Council (BASIC), hosted a panel discussion entitled, “A Draft Treaty for a WMD Free Zone in the Middle East: Time to Envisage the Practical.” The speakers included ... Sharon Dolev of BASIC in Israel and founder/director of the Israeli Disarmament Movement (IDM)".

== Middle East Treaty Organization (METO) ==
In 2017, Dolev co-founded the Middle East Treaty Organization (METO) and since has served as Executive Director of the organization. According to METO´s website the NGO works as "a coalition of civil society activists and practitioners seeking to rid the Middle East from all weapons of mass destruction as a gateway toward regional security and peace." METO works on policy, advocacy and educational programs.

== Bibliography ==
- Yermi Brenner (2 October 2013). "Questioning Israel's nuclear ambiguity policy". Al Jazeera English. Wikidata Q125790812.
- Sharon Dolev (2010). "Creating an Anti-Nuclear Movement in Israel". Palestine–Israel Journal. 16 (3). Wikidata Q125817698.
- Sharon Dolev (2013a), Nukes, Israel and the Middle East (in Hebrew) (published 2023), Wikidata Q125797380
- Sharon Dolev (2013b). "A Middle East Free of Weapons of Mass Destruction: Obstacles and Hopes". Palestine–Israel Journal. 19 (1) (published 2013). Wikidata Q125798433.
- Sharon Dolev, Leonardo Bandarra (2022-12-02). "Pathways to a WMD-free zone in the Middle East". In: Bulletin of the Atomic Scientists.
