= Sir Brian Urquhart Award =

The Sir Brian Urquhart Award is given annually by the United Nations Association – UK for distinguished service to the United Nations. The award celebrates Urquhart’s work on behalf of the UN and is presented to individuals whose own efforts reflect his contribution.

Urquhart was the second person recruited to the UN Secretariat in 1945 and worked with the Executive Committee of the Preparatory Commission of the United Nations to establish the administrative framework of the organisation that had been created by the U.N. Charter. Having served at the United Nations for four decades, Urquhart undertook the direction of peacekeeping operations, in the Middle East, Cyprus, Kashmir, Lebanon and the Congo. Urquhart retired in 1986 at the rank of Under-Secretary-General. He is currently a member of UNA-UK's expert advisory panel.

== Recipients ==
Past recipients of the award include:

- 2011: Dame Margaret Anstee
- 2012: Sir Richard Jolly
- 2013: Ian Martin
- 2014: Lynn Davies
- 2015: Lord Hannay of Chiswick
- 2016: Christine Chinkin
- 2017: Lord Judd of Portsea
- 2018: Purna Sen
- 2019: Andrew Gilmour
- 2020: Zeinab Badawi
- 2021: Nisreen Elsaim and Maria Fernanda Espinosa
- 2022: Clare Short
- 2023: Comfort Ero
- 2024: Charles Petrie
