= United Nations Association – UK =

Charity that advocates for the United Nations in the UK

- Abbreviation: UNA-UK
- Formation: 1945
- Headquarters: London, United Kingdom
- Head: Stewart Wood, Baron Wood of Anfield
- Parent organization: World Federation of United Nations Associations (WFUNA)
- Website: www.una.org.uk

The United Nations Association – UK (UNA-UK) is the official United Nations Association of the United Kingdom. It is a UK-wide grassroots UN membership organisation.

== History ==
Growing out of the League of Nations Union, UNA-UK held its first meeting in 1945 – before the UN Charter had been finalised. In 2006, UNA-UK published a comprehensive history of the organisation, written by former UNA-UK Director Frank Field.

The United Nations Association Youth Platform - UK (UNA-YP) was established in 2019 as a Youth-wing to UNA-UK and is composed of students from UK-based universities as a means of increasing youth involvement in the UN, and launching the UK's first sustainable UN & UNESCO Youth Delegations.

A catalogued collection of the organisation's publications, correspondence and other materials from 1945-2011 can be found in the archives of the London School of Economics.

== Programme of work ==
UNA-UK's policy work can be split into three main areas:

1. A Safer World: UNA-UK's peace and security programme focuses on three issues crucial to building a safer world: nuclear disarmament and non-proliferation; preventing and resolving conflict; and emerging security challenges.
2. A Fairer World: UNA-UK's human rights and humanitarian programme focuses on three issues crucial to building a fairer world: protecting civilian lives; upholding international law; securing rights for everyone.
3. A Sustainable World: UNA-UK's international development and environment programme focuses on three issues crucial to building a more sustainable world: building food security, growing responsibly, and tackling poverty.

Alongside these broad policy areas, UNA-UK's campaigns include:

- Keeping Britain Global: UNA-UK seeks to highlight the need for the UK to develop a comprehensive strategy for investing in the health of the UN and urges an increased awareness of how Britain's conduct, both domestically and on the world stage, affects the well-being of the international system.
- Mission Justice: UNA-UK calls for greater decisive action to combat sexual abuse by peacekeepers.
- 1 for 7 Billion campaign: Co-founded by UNA-UK, this campaign calls for national governments to stand up for a fairer process at the United Nations.

== All-Party Parliamentary Group on the United Nations ==
UNA-UK acts as the secretariat for The All‐Party Parliamentary Group on the United Nations (UN APPG), a cross‐party group supporting the aims and ideals of the United Nations. The UN APPG's primary objective is to raise awareness among MPs and Peers – about the UN; its myriad contributions across the areas of peace and security, development and human rights; the scope of international law and its relevance to the UK; and the applicability of the UN to the people who make up the British electorate.

In partnership with UN APPG Officers, UNA-UK sets out the strategic plan for the Group for each parliamentary session and reports back on the activity of the Group to its members.

The UN APPG meets six to eight times a year to provide a platform for high‐level international speakers.

== The Sir Brian Urquhart Award ==
Each year, UNA-UK presents the Sir Brian Urquhart Award for Distinguished Service to the UN. The award celebrates Urquhart's contribution to the UN and is presented to individuals whose work reflects his "dedication and endeavor".

== 'In Larger Freedom in the UK' ==
In early 2005, UNA-UK was tasked by the Foreign and Commonwealth Office to conduct a public and expert engagement process on UN reform in the lead-up to the UN Millennium Review Summit in September 2005.

A series of national and regional public debates were undertaken to examine the recommendations made in the UN Secretary-General's Report, In Larger Freedom. The purpose of the debates was to ensure the widest possible public input into the development of the UK government's priorities for the 2005 World Summit.

The events attracted a cross-section of society, including youth, trade unions, parliamentarians, NGOs, the armed services and academia. Common themes emerged: clear and widespread support for a strengthened United Nations, and a reaffirmation of the UN's unique importance as both a forum for negotiating viable solutions to collective threats, and an instrument for taking collective action to meet diverse threats from climate change to terrorism.

UNA-UK compiled a report based on the feedback received and supplemented this with expert input.

On 28 November at Portcullis House Foreign Office Minister Lord Triesman and UNA-UK Executive Director Sam Daws launched 'In Larger Freedom in the UK'. The launch took place following a talk by Edward Mortimer, Director of Communications and Chief Speechwriter in the UN Secretary-General's Office, at the inaugural meeting of the United Nations All-Party Parliamentary Group. The audience included parliamentarians, UNA-UK members, staff from the UN family in London, civil servants and NGO representatives.

== Publications ==
UNA-UK Magazine

UNA-UK's flagship magazine, previously titled New World, provides news, analysis and commentary on a broad spectrum of UN issues. The magazine has a specialist readership of approximately 20,000 individuals and organizations in 100 countries: readers include academic institutions, some 10,000 students and young professionals, NGOs and think tanks.

The association has been publishing news on the UN since it was founded and has been producing New World in its current form since the 1970s. It is currently published four times a year, in print and online. Past issues of New World are available on UNA-UK's website.

New World Double Issue - Autumn/Winter 2013

To coincide with UN Day 2013, UNA-UK released a double issue of New World. The Autumn issue seeks to scope out the future trends and challenges set to feature on the UN's agenda in the coming years, and the role the organization may play in shaping them.

The issue entitled 'Urgent: Diplomacy Needed', asks whether global solutions are still possible and examines why the year 2015 could prove a turning point for the world. The issue features an article by International Development Secretary Justine Greening, on the post-2015 development agenda, as well as contributions from former-MEP Stanley Johnson and Paul Ingram, the Executive Director of the British American Security Information Council.

After the Spring: Prospects for the Arab World in 2013

In Dec 2012, UNA-UK launched a major publication in collaboration with Witan Media, entitled After the Spring: Prospects for the Arab World in 2013. Aimed at scholars, practitioners and interested observers, the publication explores the effects and implications of the political uprisings that have swept the Middle East and North Africa since late 2010. It features contributions by over 50 experts from within and outside the region.

It covers the stories of change in Bahrain, Egypt, Libya, Syria, Tunisia and Yemen, and brings together an array of expertise on conflict resolution, reconstruction, development economics and national reconciliation. The volume seeks to bring us closer to an understanding of how the changes in the region have occurred and to offer insights into what may lie ahead.

Global Development Goals: Leaving No One Behind

In October 2013, UNA-UK published Global Development Goals: Leaving No One Behind, produced in collaboration with Witan Media. The publication provided analysis and recommendations for the Millennium Development Goals (MDGs) as well as insights into the development of the post-2015 development agenda.

Contributors included UN Secretary-General Ban Ki-moon, UNDP Administrator Helen Clark, UK Secretary of State for International Development Justine Greening, alongside other commentators.

== Key events ==
Kofi Annan speaks before the UNA-UK, 31 January 2006

In a speech in January 2006 at Central Hall Westminster, UN Secretary-General Kofi Annan delivered an address under UNA-UK auspices to an audience of UNA-UK members, diplomats and civil society. Speaking of statesmanship and confidence-rebuilding, he outlined his vision of a UN capable of dealing with today's crises.

Ban Ki-moon speaks before the UNA-UK, 13 June 2008

On 13 June 2008, UN Secretary-General Ban Ki-moon delivered a speech under UNA-UK's auspices in his first major public appearance in the UK. In the speech, entitled 'Securing the Common Good: The United Nations and the Expanding Global Agenda', Ban praised UNA-UK's role in cultivating constructive UK government engagement with the UN and in 'explaining the UN to the UK while helping to convey the concerns of British citizens to the UN'.

UN Forum 2010

UN Forum was a major UNA-UK event held on 12 June 2010 in London, based around the theme: 'A more effective UN for a more secure and just world. Over 1,400 people participated in the event, at which H.E. Helen Clark, head of the UN Development Program; H.E. Mary Robinson, former UN High Commissioner for Human Rights; and Dr Hans Blix, former Director-General of the International Atomic Energy Agency delivered keynote speeches.

UN Forum 2012

On Saturday 14 July 2012, two weeks before the London Olympic Games, the UNA-UK hosted UN Forum 2012. Topics of discussion included nuclear disarmament, population and human rights, among others. Speakers included former UN Deputy Secretary-General Lord Malloch-Brown, Sir Malcolm Rifkind, H.E. Karen Pierce CMG and H.E. Kamalesh Sharma. In a surprise appearance, UNA-UK Patron Sir Patrick Stewart also addressed attendees on the vital importance of the UN. With an attendance of over 1,000, the event was believed to be the largest civil society event on the UN to be held in the UK in 2012.

UNA Youth Conference 2013 'Nuclear Realities', 23 February 2013

New Nuclear Realities, UNA Youth's 2013 conference, took place on Saturday 23 February in North London. Participants enjoyed lectures and panel debates with high-profile nuclear professionals, as well as UN careers guidance and networking opportunities. Speakers included John Ducan, former UK Ambassador for Multilateral Arms Control and Disarmament, and representatives of BASIC, IISS, ACRONYM and Chatham House. Lord Hannay of Chiswick, former UK ambassador to the UN, delivered the day's keynote speech.

=== An Audience with Secretary-General Ban Ki-moon, 5 February 2016 ===
UNA-UK hosted H.E. Ban Ki-moon, United Nations Secretary-General, at a major public event held at London's Central Hall Westminster. During the event, Sir Jeremy Greenstock, Chairman of UNA-UK, moderated an interactive discussion with the UN Secretary-General, incorporating questions from social media and those in attendance on the day.

=== A Conversation with Secretary-General António Guterres, 10 May 2017 ===
UNA-UK hosted H.E. António Guterres, Secretary-General of the United Nations, for his first major public speech in the UK on the afternoon of 10 May at Central Hall Westminster. Following his speech, Mr Guterres took questions from the public in a session moderated by UNA-UK's Natalie Samarasinghe. During this session, the hashtag used to submit questions via Twitter was trending number one in the UK.

== UNA members ==
The UNA-UK, as a grassroots membership organization, has a large network of volunteer-run branches which give individuals across the United Kingdom a chance to partake in UN activities. These range from speaker and fundraising events to film screenings and coffee mornings, these activities raise awareness and interest in the work of the United Nations at a local level across the country.

== See also ==
- World Federation of United Nations Associations
- United Nations Association Wales
- Humphry Berkeley
- United Kingdom and the United Nations
