= Ralph Bunche: An American Odyssey =

Documentary film from 2001

- Directed by: William Greaves
- Written by: Brian Urquhart
- Screenplay by: William Greaves; Leslie Lee
- Produced by: William Greaves; Louise Archambault
- Starring: Ralph Bunche; Sidney Poitier
- Production company: William Greaves Productions
- Distributed by: California Newsreel
- Release date: January 19, 2001
- Running time: 117 minutes
- Country: United States
- Language: English

Ralph Bunche: An American Odyssey was an American 2001 documentary film by William Greaves. It was the first in-depth documentary film that was produced on the life and legacy of Ralph Bunche, an African-American diplomat and the first person of color to win the Nobel Peace Prize.

The film was based on the 1993 biography written by Brian Urquhart, which had the same name. Greaves took ten years to make the film and he researched countless old manuscripts, newspapers, photos, and newsreel footage. A sequel was released Ralph Bunche: The Odyssey Continues... (2003).
