= Mummies (film) =

2023 Spanish film by Juan Jesús García Galocha

- International theatrical release poster
- Spanish: Momias
- Directed by: Juan Jesús García Galocha "Galo"
- Screenplay by: Javier López Barreira; Jordi Gasull
- Story by: Jordi Gasull
- Produced by: Jordi Gasull; Pedro Solis; Toni Novella; Cleber Berretta; Francisco Selma; Marc Sabé
- Starring: Joe Thomas; Eleanor Tomlinson; Celia Imrie; Hugh Bonneville; Sean Bean
- Edited by: Emily Killick
- Music by: Fernando Velázquez
- Production companies: Atresmedia Cine; 4 Cats Pictures; Anangu Grup; Moomios Movie AIE
- Distributed by: Warner Bros. Pictures
- Release dates: January 5, 2023 (Australia); February 24, 2023 (Spain)
- Running time: 88 minutes
- Country: Spain
- Language: English
- Budget: $12 million
- Box office: $54.5 million

Mummies (Spanish: Momias) is a 2023 English-language Spanish animated comedy film directed by Juan Jesús García Galocha (in his feature directorial debut) from a screenplay by Javier López Barreira and Jordi Gasull and a story by Gasull. It features the voices of Joe Thomas, Eleanor Tomlinson, Celia Imrie, Hugh Bonneville and Sean Bean.

Initially scheduled for release in 2021, Mummies was theatrically released in Spain on February 24, 2023. It received mixed reviews from critics.

== Premise ==
The film follows three mummies from the underworld who embark on a journey and end up in present-day London in search of an old ring belonging to an Ancient Egyptian Royal Family that was stolen from a tomb by the ambitious archaeologist Lord Carnaby, whose goal is to kidnap Princess Nefer for an exhibition after her irrepressible singing goes viral. The mummies end up in several hilarious situations as they try to understand and adapt to 21st century London in an obvious culture clash.

== Voice cast ==
- Joe Thomas as Thut, an ex-chariot racer left with post-traumatic stress disorder after a crash
- Eleanor Tomlinson as Nefer, an irrepressible princess who loves singing
  - Karina Pasian as Nefer's singing voice
- Santiago Winder as Sekhem, Thut's younger brother whose skill is with boomerangs
- Hugh Bonneville as Lord Sylvester Carnaby
- Sean Bean as Pharaoh
- Shakka as Ed A. Murphy
- Dan Starkey as Danny and Dennys, Lord Carnaby's bickering henchmen
- Celia Imrie as Mother June Carnaby
- Morwenna Banks as Usi & Female fan
- Rachel Adedeji as Aida female lead
- Oliver Lidert as Radames, Aida male lead; High priest; Male fan; Soldiers; Crowd and Chief operator
- Melissa Bayern as Old woman
- Simon Paisley Day as TV reporter

== Release ==
Mummies was scheduled to be released in 2021 under the name Moomios as part of a partnership between Atresmedia Cine and Warner Bros. España. However, it was later delayed to 2023 after two years of extended production and was changed to its current name. The first trailer was released on October 31, 2022. The film was first released in international territories, beginning with Australia, on January 5, 2023. The film later released in Spain and in selected theatres in the United States by Warner Bros. Pictures on February 24, 2023. The film later released in the UK and Ireland on March 31, 2023. The soundtrack was released digitally by WaterTower Music on February 24, 2023, on streaming services including Apple Music, Spotify, and Pandora.

== Reception ==
On review aggregation website Rotten Tomatoes, the film holds an approval rating of 53% based on 19 reviews, with an average rating of 5.00/10.

== Accolades ==
Year	Award	Category	Nominee(s)	Result	Ref.
2023	29th Forqué Awards	Best Animation Film		Nominated	
2024	38th Goya Awards	Best Animated Film		Nominated	

== See also ==
- List of Spanish films of 2023
