= Brian Urquhart =

British Army officer, politician and writer (1919–2021)

Sir Brian Urquhart KCMG MBE
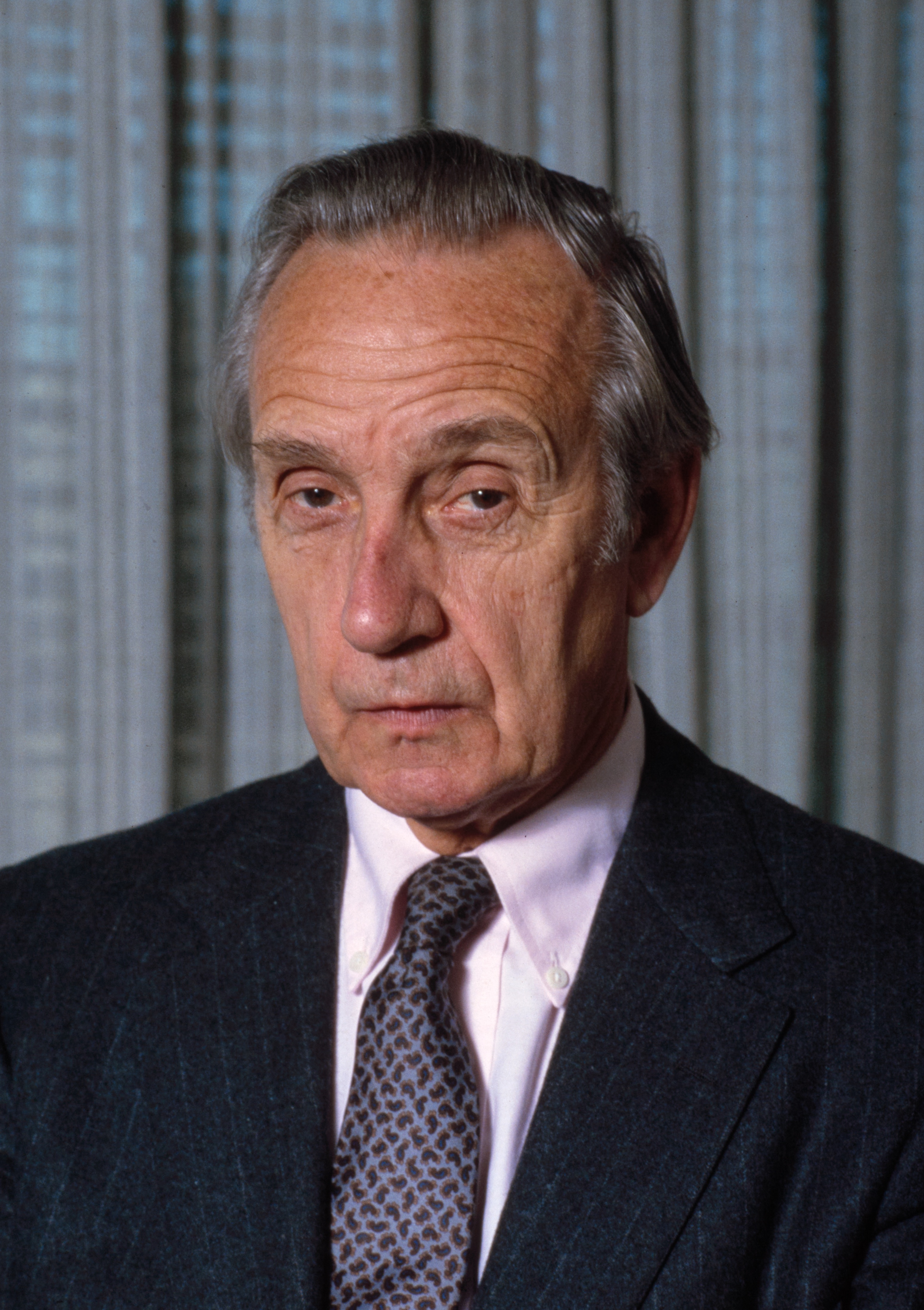
- Urquhart at the United Nations

Under-Secretary-General of the United Nations for Special Political Affairs
- In office 1972–1986
- Preceded by: Ralph Bunche
- Succeeded by: Marrack Goulding

Personal details
- Born: Brian Edward Urquhart; 28 February 1919 Bridport, Dorset, England
- Died: 2 January 2021 (aged 101) Tyringham, Massachusetts, U.S.
- Spouse: Lady Sidney Urquhart
- Education: Christ Church, Oxford
- Profession: Soldier and diplomat

Military service
- Allegiance: United Kingdom
- Branch/service: British Army
- Years of service: 1939–1945
- Rank: Major
- Unit: Dorsetshire Regiment
- Battles/wars: Second World War

Major Sir Brian Edward Urquhart KCMG MBE (/ˈər.kət/ UR-kut) (28 February 1919 – 2 January 2021) was a British Army officer, politician and writer. He played a significant role in the founding of the United Nations. He went on to serve as its Under-Secretary-General for Special Political Affairs.

== Early life ==
Urquhart was born in Bridport, Dorset, England, the son of the artist Murray McNeel Caird Urquhart (1880–1972) and the teacher Bertha Rendall (1883–1984). His father abandoned the family in 1925 when Brian was six years old.

After a time at Badminton School in Bristol, where his mother taught, Urquhart won a scholarship to Westminster School and went on to Christ Church, Oxford, before leaving university on the outbreak of war.

== Military service ==
When World War II broke out, Urquhart joined the British Army and, after a brief training period, was commissioned as an officer in the Dorsetshire Regiment on 14 January 1940. His service number was 113613. He was posted to the 5th Battalion of his regiment, a recently raised Territorial Army (TA) unit which was part of the 43rd (Wessex) Infantry Division.

The Battle of France ended before his unit could deploy to the Continent, and he and his men were part of the coastal defence forces in and around Dover during the Battle of Britain. He later transferred to the 1st Airborne Division as an intelligence officer. Urquhart was severely injured in a training drop in August 1942, damaging three vertebrae in his lower spine and breaking several bones. He was warned that his loss of mobility could be permanent, and spent months in the hospital recovering and regaining his strength.

After his recovery, Urquhart served in North Africa and the Mediterranean, before returning to England to participate in the planning of airborne operations associated with Operation Overlord. In the autumn, as the 1st Airborne Corps intelligence officer, he assisted with the planning for Operation Market Garden, an ambitious airborne operation designed to seize the Dutch bridges over the rivers barring the Allied advance into northern Germany. He became convinced that the plan was critically flawed, and attempted to persuade his superiors to modify or abort their plans in light of crucial information obtained from aerial reconnaissance and the Dutch resistance.

The episode was described by Cornelius Ryan in his book on "Market Garden", A Bridge Too Far. In the film version, directed by Richard Attenborough, Urquhart's character (portrayed by Irish actor Frank Grimes) was renamed "Major Fuller", to avoid confusion with the British general Roy Urquhart, the commander of the 1st Airborne Division at Arnhem. The subsequent failure of the operation and the heavy casualties that resulted vindicated Urquhart's judgment. He became deeply depressed by his failure to persuade his superiors to halt the operation, and requested a transfer out of the airborne forces.

After leaving the airborne forces, he was transferred to T-Force, a unit responsible for searching for German scientists and military technology. Urquhart captured the German nuclear scientist Wilhelm Groth.

Urquhart was one of the first allied personnel to enter the Bergen-Belsen concentration camp in April 1945. His experience there partly spurred him on to be involved in peacemaking at the United Nations.

== United Nations ==
Urquhart was a member of the British diplomatic staff involved in the setting-up of the United Nations in 1945, assisting the Executive Committee of the Preparatory Commission of the United Nations in establishing the administrative framework of the organisation that had been created by the U.N. Charter. He subsequently became an aide to Trygve Lie, the first Secretary-General of the United Nations. Urquhart helped handle the administrative and logistical challenges involved in getting the U.N. established in New York City. Not particularly well liked by Lie, Urquhart was subsequently moved to a minor U.N. administrative post. When Dag Hammarskjöld became the second Secretary-General in 1953, however, he appointed Urquhart as one of his main advisors. He loyally served by Hammarskjöld's side until the latter's death in 1961, admiring him greatly in spite of admittedly never getting to know him very well on a personal level.

During the Suez Crisis of 1956 Urquhart played a critical role in creating what turned out to be the first major U.N. effort towards conflict resolution and peacekeeping. As Hammarskjöld's only major adviser with military experience Urquhart took the lead in organising the first U.N. peacekeeping force, which was designed to separate the Egyptian and Israeli forces then fighting each other in the Sinai Peninsula. To differentiate the peacekeepers from other soldiers, the U.N. wanted the soldiers to wear blue berets. When it turned out that those would take six weeks to make, Urquhart proposed the characteristic blue helmets, which could be converted in a day by painting over normal ones.

In the early 1960s Urquhart served as the main U.N. representative in the Congo, succeeding his friend Ralph Bunche. His efforts to stabilise the war-torn country were hampered by the chaos created by innumerable warring factions. At one point Urquhart was abducted, brutally beaten and threatened with death by undisciplined Katangese troops. He survived only by persuading his captors that his death would bring retribution by U.N. Gurkha troops, whom the Katangans greatly feared.

He served as the U.N. Under-Secretary-General for Special Political Affairs from 1972 until his retirement in 1986. As Under-Secretary-General, Urquhart's main functions were the direction of peacekeeping forces in the Middle East and Cyprus, and negotiations in these two areas; amongst others, his contributions also included work on the negotiations relating to a Namibia peace settlement, negotiations in Kashmir, Lebanon and work on peaceful uses for nuclear energy.

Alongside his autobiography, A Life in Peace and War (Urquhart 1987), his work with Erskine B Childers includes several books of methods that he believed would make the United Nations more effective. In Renewing the United Nations System, he recommended the establishment of a United Nations Parliamentary Assembly through Article 22 of the United Nations Charter. His book Decolonization and World Peace (Urquhart 1989) is based on his 1988 Tom Slick world peace lectures that he gave at the Lyndon B. Johnson School of Public Affairs at the University of Texas, Austin. The appendices offer further insight into his views on the peacekeeping potential of the United Nations. Included are his remarks at the Nobel Prize banquet in Norway on the occasion of the award of the 1988 Nobel Peace Prize to the United Nations Peace-Keeping Forces. He also wrote biographies of Hammarskjöld and Bunche.

== Honours ==
Urquhart was made a Knight Commander of the Order of St Michael and St George in 1986. He was also a member of the Order of the British Empire. He received the Freedom from Fear Award (part of the Four Freedoms Award) in 1984, as well as the Distinguished Peacekeeper Award by the International Peace Academy.

To celebrate Urquhart’s work on behalf of the United Nations, the Sir Brian Urquhart Award is given annually by the United Nations Association – UK for distinguished service to the United Nations.

A portrait of Urquhart by Philip Pearlstein is held in the collection of the National Portrait Gallery, London.

His biographical book Ralph Bunche: An American Odyssey (1993), was used to create a William Greaves documentary film of the same name in 2001.

== Personal life ==
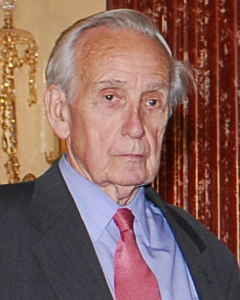
Urquhart in 2006

Urquhart was described as Non-religious. He married Alfreda Huntington, daughter of the writer Gladys Huntington, but the couple later divorced. Their children were Thomas, Katharine, and Robert. He married Sidney Damrosch Howard in 1963. She was the daughter of Sidney Howard, the American writer and playwright. Her grandfather was composer and conductor Walter Damrosch. Their children were Rachel and Charles.

Urquhart wrote essays for The New York Review of Books and a memoir, A Life in Peace and War. He also wrote biographies and books about the United Nations.

In 2021, Urquhart died at his home in Tyringham, Massachusetts, at the age of 101. His second wife, Lady Sidney Urquhart, died the day after he did.

== Selected works ==
=== Books ===
- Urquhart, Brian (1972). Hammarskjold. Knopf. ISBN 978-0-394-47960-6.
- Urquhart, Brian (1987). A Life in Peace and War. Harper & Row. ISBN 9780060158408.
- Urquhart, Brian (1 August 1989). Decolonization and World Peace. University of Texas Press. ISBN 978-0-292-71559-2.
- Urquhart, Brian; Childers, Erskine (1990). A World in Need of Leadership: Tomorrow's United Nations. Dag Hammarskjöld Foundation. ISBN 978-91-85214-16-7.
- Urquhart, Brian; Childers, Erskine (1992). Towards a More Effective United Nations: Two Studies. Dag Hammarskjöld Foundation.
- Urquhart, Brian (1993). Ralph Bunche: An American Life. W.W. Norton. ISBN 978-0-393-03527-8.
- Childers, Erskine; Urquhart, Brian (1994). Renewing the United Nations System. Dag Hammarskjöld Foundation.

=== Lectures ===
- Reflections on the United Nations: Interviews of Sir Brian Urquhart by Ms. Virginia Morris, Principal Legal Officer Codification Division, United Nations Office of Legal Affairs in the Lecture Series of the United Nations Audiovisual Library of International Law

Preceded by Ralph Bunche	Under-Secretary-General of the United Nations for Special Political Affairs; 1972–1986	Succeeded by Marrack Goulding
