= Colette (2018 film) =

2018 film by Wash Westmoreland

- Theatrical release poster
- Directed by: Wash Westmoreland
- Screenplay by: Richard Glatzer; Rebecca Lenkiewicz; Wash Westmoreland
- Story by: Richard Glatzer
- Produced by: Elizabeth Karlsen; Pamela Koffler; Michel Litvak; Christine Vachon
- Starring: Keira Knightley; Dominic West; Eleanor Tomlinson; Denise Gough; Aiysha Hart
- Cinematography: Giles Nuttgens
- Edited by: Lucia Zucchetti
- Music by: Thomas Adès
- Production companies: Number 9 Films; Killer Films; Bold Films
- Distributed by: Bleecker Street; 30West (United States); Lionsgate (United Kingdom); Vertigo Média Kft. (Hungary)
- Release dates: January 20, 2018 (Sundance); September 21, 2018 (United States); January 11, 2019 (United Kingdom)
- Running time: 112 minutes
- Countries: United States; United Kingdom; Hungary
- Language: English
- Box office: $15.9 million

Colette is a 2018 biographical drama film directed by Wash Westmoreland, from a screenplay by Westmoreland, Rebecca Lenkiewicz and Richard Glatzer, based upon the life of the French novelist Colette. It stars Keira Knightley, Dominic West, Eleanor Tomlinson, and Denise Gough.

It had its world premiere at the Sundance Film Festival on January 20, 2018. It was released in the United States on September 21, 2018, by Bleecker Street and 30West. The film premiered in London at the BFI London Film Festival and was released in the United Kingdom on January 11, 2019, by Lionsgate.

== Plot ==
Sidonie-Gabrielle Colette is a young woman from the rural Saint-Sauveur-en-Puisaye at the end of the 19th century, who begins an affair with Willy. Willy eventually brings Colette to Paris as his bride, with socialites expressing surprise a libertine like him would marry. Willy refers to himself as a "literary entrepreneur", employing several ghostwriters to write articles. However, he finds the limited output does not bring in enough revenue to cover his expenses, due to his expensive lifestyle entertaining socialites. He commissions one ghostwriter to work on a novel while Colette manages his correspondence. One day, Colette finds Willy with a prostitute, leading to a separation. He eventually persuades her to return, promising honesty.

Colette also tells him of her days as a schoolgirl. With Willy increasingly unable to pay his writers, he asks Colette to write a novel based on her school stories. She completes a draft of Claudine à l'école, which Willy rejects for lacking plot. Years later, some of Willy's furniture is repossessed, and he stumbles on the draft. He suggests revisions and the novel is submitted and published under Willy's byline. Claudine à l'école becomes a bestseller, particularly attracting a female readership. Faced with his first true hit, Willy tells his publisher a sequel is coming, purchases a country house, and locks Colette in a room there to force her to write. Initially objecting, Colette writes Claudine à Paris, which becomes another bestseller.

As Colette and Willy become an increasingly recognized couple, she attracts the notice of Georgie Raoul-Duval, a Louisiana debutante, and they begin an affair. Jealous, Willy also begins an affair with Georgie. Colette discovers this, and bases her next book, Claudine en ménage, on the episode. Fearing scandal, Georgie's husband purchases and burns all copies of the book before sale, but does not purchase the copyright, allowing Willy to reprint and sell the book.

The Claudine books enjoy continued success, including a stage adaptation, starring Polaire. Colette begins an affair with Missy, who presents as male. They begin dancing and develop an act at the Moulin Rouge that draws a morally outraged response when they kiss onstage. Willy cites the act as a financial disaster and sells all rights to the Claudine books for 5,000 francs without Colette's knowledge. Angered and feeling betrayed, Colette leaves Willy. Willy asks his employee Paul to burn the Claudine manuscripts; Paul returns them to Colette instead.

Colette becomes recognized as a writer in her own right, beginning with The Vagabond, published under her byline, about her music hall experience.

== Cast ==
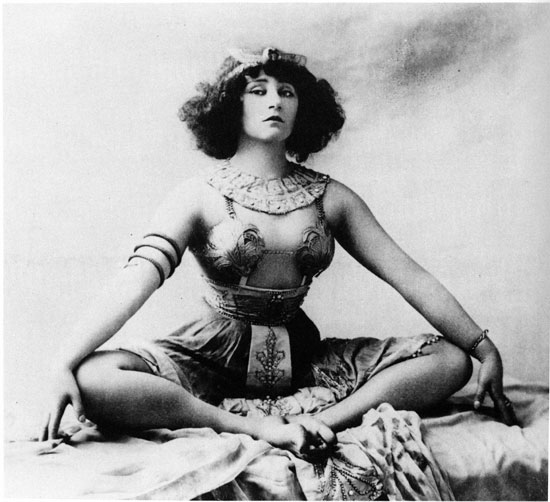
The real Colette in "Rêve d'Egypte"

- Keira Knightley as Gabrielle Colette
- Dominic West as Henry Gauthier-Villars
- Eleanor Tomlinson as Georgie Raoul-Duval
- Aiysha Hart as Polaire
- Fiona Shaw as Sido
- Denise Gough as Mathilde de Morny / "Missy"
- Robert Pugh as Jules
- Rebecca Root as Rachilde
- Jake Graf as Gaston Arman de Caillavet
- Julian Wadham as Ollendorff
- Polina Litvak as Lily
- Johnny K. Palmer as Paul Héon
- Caroline Boulton as "Flossy"

== Production ==
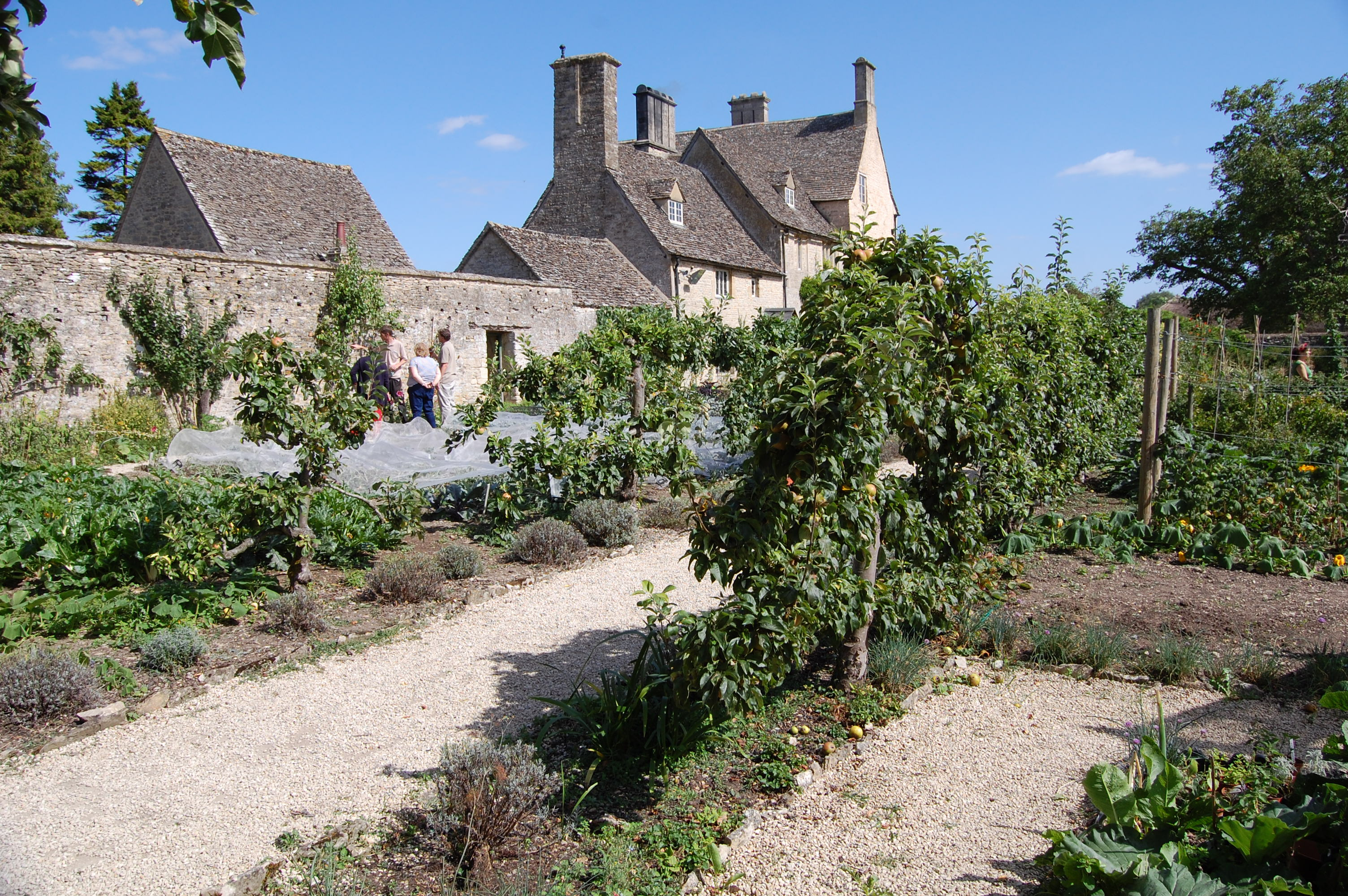
Cogges Manor Farm

It was first announced on February 1, 2016, that Colette would be directed by Still Alice's (2014) Wash Westmoreland, who co-wrote the script with his late Still Alice collaborator and husband Richard Glatzer. The film reunites the producing team behind Carol, Number 9 Films and Killer Films. Bold Films financed and co-produced the film, marking the company's first foray into the UK. On the same day Deadline announced that Keira Knightley would star as Colette. On May 15, 2017, it was announced that Dominic West would join the cast as Colette's first husband. Chris Pratt, Josh Henderson and Sullivan Stapleton were also considered. Deadline announced on May 23, 2017, that Denise Gough, Fiona Shaw, Robert Pugh, and Rebecca Root had joined Knightley and West in the film. On June 21, 2017, it was announced that Eleanor Tomlinson and Aiysha Hart had joined the cast.

Gary Michael Walters announced that production would start filming in the summer of 2017. On May 26, 2017, the film's crew was spotted filming at Cogges Manor Farm, Witney in Oxfordshire.

Cogges Manor Farm doubled as Collette's childhood home. Salcy Park in Northamptonshire was used as her country house. Most of the Paris scenes were not shot in Paris, but in Budapest, Hungary.

== Release ==
The film had its world premiere at the Sundance Film Festival on January 20, 2018. Shortly after, Bleecker Street, 30West and Lionsgate acquired US and UK distribution rights to the film, respectively. It was released in the United States on September 21, 2018, to "select theatres" and wide released on October 12, 2018. It was released in the United Kingdom on January 11, 2019.

== Reception ==
=== Box office ===
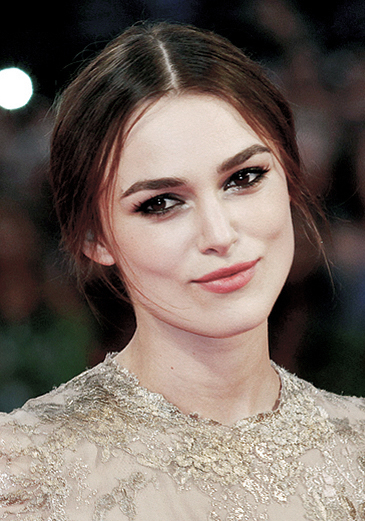
Keira Knightley's performance received positive reviews.

Colette grossed $5.1 million in the United States and Canada, and $10.8 million in other territories, for a total worldwide gross of $15.9 million.

=== Critical response ===
On review aggregator Rotten Tomatoes, the film holds an approval rating of 87% based on 222 reviews, with an average rating of 7.2/10. The website critical consensus reads, "Formally familiar but a brilliant match for its lead, Colette is a thoroughly entertaining biopic and an overdue testament to Keira Knightley's underrated gifts." On Metacritic, it has a weighted average score of 74 out of 100, based on 40 critics, indicating "generally favorable" reviews.

For RogerEbert.com, Nick Allen wrote a positive review after the film's world premiere at Sundance. He said, "As a period film that's more than ready for 2018, Colette embodies the power of thinking forward in more ways than one." According to reviewer Manohla Dargis of The New York Times, "Mr. Westmoreland [film director of Colette] ... wanted to make a liberation story. He has succeeded, at times movingly ... The whole thing is too smooth, clean, and aspirational. And of course, he omits much ... but with a life this exuberantly full, how could he not?"

Vikram Murthi at The A.V. Club, was less enthused, writing "Keira Knightley's charms fail to save the timely, tepid biopic Colette" and graded it "C+".

=== Accolades ===
Award	Date of ceremony	Category	Recipient(s)	Result	Ref.
British Independent Film Awards	2 December 2018	Best Supporting Actor	Dominic West	Nominated	
British Independent Film Awards	2 December 2018	Best Costume Design	Andrea Flesch	Nominated	
British Independent Film Awards	2 December 2018	Best Make Up & Hair Design	Ivana Primorac	Nominated	
British Independent Film Awards	2 December 2018	Best Production Design	Michael Carlin	Nominated	
Dorian Awards	January 12, 2019	Unsung Film of the Year	Colette	Nominated	
Hollywood Music in Media Awards	November 14, 2018	Best Original Score — Independent Film	Thomas Adès	Won	
Independent Spirit Awards	February 23, 2019	Best Screenplay	Richard Glatzer, Rebecca Lenkiewicz, and Wash Westmoreland	Nominated	
Satellite Awards	February 22, 2019	Best Original Score	Thomas Adès	Nominated	
Satellite Awards	February 22, 2019	Best Costume Design	Andrea Flesch	Nominated	
Seattle Film Critics Society	December 17, 2018	Best Costume Design	Andrea Flesch	Nominated	
