= Eleanor Tomlinson =

English actress (born 1992)

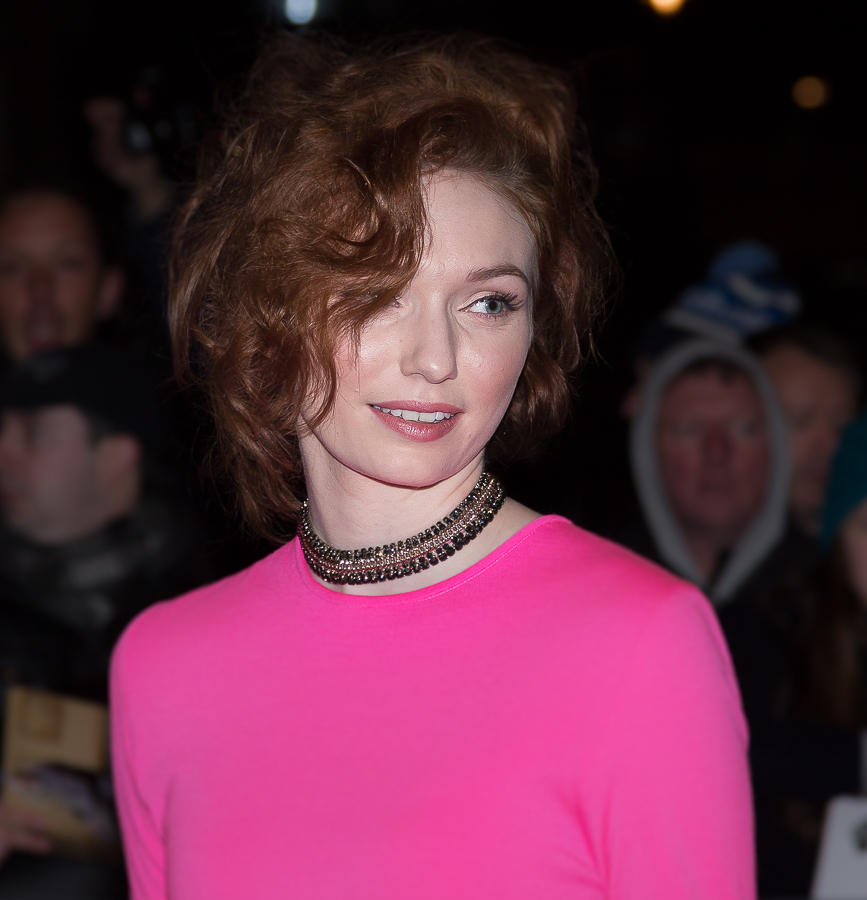
- Tomlinson at the BIFA, 2014
- Born: Eleanor May Tomlinson; 19 May 1992 (age 34); London, England
- Occupation: Actress
- Years active: 2005–present
- Spouse: Will Owen (m. 2022)
- Children: 1

Eleanor May Tomlinson (born 19 May 1992) is an English actress. She has appeared in films including Angus, Thongs and Perfect Snogging (2008), Jack the Giant Slayer (2013), Colette (2018) and Love Wedding Repeat (2020). She also starred in the BBC One series The White Queen (2013), Poldark (2015–2019), The Outlaws (2021), and War of the Worlds (2019).

== Early life ==
Tomlinson was born in London, England. She and her family moved to Beverley, East Riding of Yorkshire, when she was young and she attended Beverley High School. She is the daughter of Judith Hibbert, a singer, and Malcolm Tomlinson, an actor and horse racing commentator. Her brother, Ross Tomlinson (born 1994), is also an actor.

== Career ==
In 2006, Tomlinson appeared in The Illusionist as Young Sophie. She starred in the teen film Angus, Thongs and Perfect Snogging in 2008, in which she plays Jas. She played Kirsten in the 2009 Pro Sieben international production The Village alongside David Bamber, under the direction of Robert Sigl.

She went on to play Eve, an alien, in "The Mad Woman in the Attic"—episodes three and four of Series 3 of The Sarah Jane Adventures—in 2009, and Fiona Chattaway in the film Alice in Wonderland, which premiered in theatres on 5 March 2010. In 2013, she was Xenya in the film Siberian Education by Gabriele Salvatores.

After an extensive search, she was cast as Princess Isabelle in Jack the Giant Slayer (2013), directed by Bryan Singer. She also appeared in the Agatha Christie's Poirot episode "The Labours of Hercules" (2013) as Alice Cunningham.

In 2013, she starred in the TV series The White Queen, as Lady Isabel Neville, and as Georgiana Darcy in the BBC adaptation of Death Comes to Pemberley. Between 2015 and 2019, she played Demelza Poldark in the BBC One television series Poldark.

In 2018, she recorded and released an album, Tales from Home, covering traditional British songs and other standards.

Tomlinson was #56 on the "Radio Times TV 100" list for 2018, a list said to be determined by television executives and broadcasting veterans.

She portrayed Amy in the 2019 BBC television series The War of the Worlds—based on the H. G. Wells novel of the same name—a role expanded from that of the wife of the book's narrator. In 2021 she played Lady Gabby in Stephen Merchant and Elgin James' comedy drama for BBC television, The Outlaws. In 2023, she played Evie in the Channel 4 thriller The Couple Next Door and, in 2024, she played Sylvie in Netflix's romantic drama series One Day, an adaption of David Nicholl's book of the same name. In 2024, she joined the production of the PBS television adaptation of The Forsyte Saga.

Tomlinson voiced Princess Nefer in the English version of the 2023 film Mummies.

In June 2026, she played the lead character Amanda Blakefield in the Channel 5 drama The Fortune.

== Personal life ==
In July 2022, Tomlinson married rugby player Will Owen. In October 2024, the couple announced they were expecting a baby, whose birth was announced in February 2025.

== Filmography ==
=== Film ===
Year	Title	Role	Notes
2006	The Illusionist	Young Sophie Von Teschen	
2008	Angus, Thongs and Perfect Snogging	Jas	
2010	Alice in Wonderland	Fiona Chattaway	
2013	Jack the Giant Slayer	Princess Isabelle	
2013	Siberian Education	Xenya Sakurova	
2014	The Curse of Styria	Lara	
2015	A Stranger Kind	Lily	Short film
2016	Alleycats	Danni	
2016	Revolution: New Art for a New World	Lyubov Popova (voice)	
2017	Loving Vincent	Adeline Ravoux (voice}	
2018	Colette	Georgie Raoul-Duval	
2020	Love Wedding Repeat	Hayley Carboni	
2023	Mummies	Princess Nefer (voice)	English version

=== Television ===
Year	Title	Role	Notes
2005	Falling	Little Daphne with Branklyn	Television film
2007	Einstein and Eddington	Agnes Müller	Television film
2009	Theatre Live!	Sarah	Episode: "Syrinx"
2009	The Sarah Jane Adventures	Eve	Episodes: "The Mad Woman in the Attic: Parts One & Two"
2009	Hepzibah - Sie holt dich im Schlaf	Kirsten Schwartz	Television film. Also known as The Village
2010	The Lost Future	Miru	Television film
2013	The White Queen	Isabel Neville, Duchess of Clarence	Mini-series; 7 episodes
2013	Agatha Christie's Poirot	Alice Cunningham	Episode: "The Labours of Hercules"
2013	Death Comes to Pemberley	Georgiana Darcy	Mini-series; 3 episodes
2015–2019	Poldark	Demelza Poldark	Lead role. Series 1–5; 43 episodes
2018	Ordeal by Innocence	Mary Durrant (née Argyll)	Mini-series; 3 episodes
2019	The War of the Worlds	Amy	Main cast. Mini-series; 3 episodes
2021	Intergalactic	Candy Skov-King	Main cast. 8 episodes
2021–2023	The Nevers	Mary Brighton	Main cast. 5 episodes
2021–2024	The Outlaws	Lady Gabriella Penrose-Howe	Main cast. Series 1–3; 17 episodes
2023	A Small Light	Tess	Mini-series; 3 episodes
2023	The Couple Next Door	Evie Greenwood	Lead role. 6 episodes
2024	One Day	Sylvie Cope	Mini-series; 5 episodes
2025–2026	The Forsytes	Louisa Byrne	Main cast. Series 1–2; 10 episodes
2026	The Fortune	Amanda Blakefield	Lead role. 4 episodes

=== Video games ===
Year	Title	Role	Notes
2026	Squadron 42	Saic Rebecca Trejo	Voice and motion capture. Post-production
