= International Crisis Group =

Non-profit think tank for conflict research and prevention

- Abbreviation: Crisis Group
- Formation: 1995
- Type: International non-governmental organization
- Tax ID no.: EIN: 525170039
- Headquarters: 235 Avenue Louise, Brussels, Belgium
- Fields: International conflict prevention and resolution
- Key people: Comfort Ero (president and CEO); Robert Malley (former president and CEO); Susana Malcorra (co-chair); Frank Giustra (co-chair)
- Website: www.crisisgroup.org

The International Crisis Group (ICG; also known as the Crisis Group) is a global non-profit, non-governmental organisation founded in 1995. It is a think tank, used by policymakers and academics, conducting research and analysis on global crises. ICG has described itself as "working to prevent wars and shape policies that will build a more peaceful world".

ICG states that it provides early warning through its monthly CrisisWatch bulletin, a global conflict tracker designed to identify both risks of escalation and opportunities to advance peace. The organisation says that it produces detailed analysis and advice on specific policy issues that are affecting conflict or potential conflict situations; that it engages with policy-makers, regional organisations and other key actors to promote peaceful solutions to major conflicts; and that it offers new strategic and tactical thinking on intractable conflicts and crises.

The ICG has been characterized as "liberal". Its permanent field presence forms the basis of the organisation's methodology. It has regional programmers covering over 70 actual and potential conflicts in Africa, Asia, Europe and Central Asia, Latin America and the Caribbean, the Middle East and North Africa, and the United States. As of September 2023, Crisis Group has approximately 150 staff members from various backgrounds, including academia, civil society, diplomacy and media. Since December 2021, Comfort Ero is the president and CEO of the organisation with Richard Atwood as Executive Vice President.

== History ==
George Soros provided the organisation's seed funding and continues to support it. The first government representative to offer financial support was Finnish President Martti Ahtisaari, in March 1994. (Note: Ahtisaari had been elected President of Finland a month earlier, and provided $100,000 in funding from Finland.) That same year, Gareth Evans, as Foreign Minister of Australia, pledged $500,000. (Note: "Gareth Evans, then Foreign Minister of Australia, who indicated his government would be prepared to provide up to $500,000 in multi-year funding if we decided to move ahead.") As private individuals, Ahtisaari later became Chairman of ICG, and Evans became CEO of ICG.

A January 1995 meeting in London brought many international figures together and approved a proposal for an annual budget of $8 million and 75 full-time staff. In mid-1995, the organisation was formally registered in the U.S. as a tax-exempt non-profit. From 1996 to 1999, Crisis Group had an annual budget of around $2 million and around 20 full-time staff; by 2017 its budget had risen to over $17 million. Crisis Group received funding under grants from governments, charitable foundations, private companies and individual donors. For the financial year ending June 30, 2019, it received 43% of its funding from governments, 31% from foundations, 22% from the private sector, 2% from in-kind contributions and 2% from investment income.

In a 2014 paper for Third World Quarterly, social researcher Berit Bliesemann de Guevara writes that ICG's significant budget was a requirement of its activities, though small compared to government research agencies. She wrote that "Critics have argued that it is not the amount but the sources of the ICG's funding which have opened Western policymakers' doors to its advocacy, while at the same time (possibly) compromising the ICG's political independence". She wrote that the ICG has "contradict[ed] the idea of simple, straightforward connections between donors and reporting" through the broad variety of its donors.

Robert Malley, who previously served in the Obama administration as a senior adviser, became president and CEO of ICG in January 2018. Malley had his ties to the Obama electoral campaign severed in May 2008, when it became public that Malley had been in discussions with the militant Palestinian group Hamas, listed by the U.S. State Department as a terrorist organisation. His predecessors in the position include former UN Under-Secretary-General for Peacekeeping Operations Jean-Marie Guéhenno, former UN High Commissioner for Human Rights and Justice of the Supreme Court of Canada and later Governor General of Canada Louise Arbour, and former Foreign Minister of Australia Gareth Evans.

The Crisis Group, and in particular its Iran Project Director, Ali Vaez, played an important role in advancing the 2015 Joint Comprehensive Plan of Action (JCPOA).

== Organisation ==
=== Offices ===
Crisis Group is headquartered in Brussels, with advocacy offices in Washington DC, New York and London.

=== Board of trustees ===
As of September 2023, Crisis Group Board of Trustees has 44 members. Frank Giustra, founder of the Giustra Foundation and Acceso, became co-chair in 2020, and Susana Malcorra, former Foreign Minister of Argentina and former Chef de Cabinet of the UN Secretary-General, joined him as co-chair in 2021.

Previously, the board was chaired by Mark Malloch Brown, former UN Deputy Secretary-General and Administrator of the United Nations Development Programme. Past board members have included Sandy Berger and Stephen Solarz. Chairmen emeritus are Martti Ahtisaari, George J. Mitchell and Thomas R. Pickering.

Gareth Evans remained President Emeritus as of 2023.

== Awards ==
Crisis Group's "In Pursuit of Peace Award” was established in 2005, and is associated with a gala event in New York City. Recipients include U.S. Presidents Bill Clinton and George H.W. Bush, Hillary Clinton, Brazilian President Lula da Silva, Nobel Peace Prize laureates Martti Ahtisaari and Ellen Johnson Sirleaf, and financier and philanthropist George Soros.

Recipients for 2018 included Frank Giustra, founder of the Radcliffe Foundation and a prolific entrepreneur and financier, and Prince Zeid Raad Al Hussein, UN High Commissioner for Human Rights and the Olympic Refugee and Paralympic Teams.

== Reception ==
The Swedish ONG Transnational Foundation for Peace and Future Research alleged in 2005 that the ICG board of directors' had close ties to Western governments, a lack of independent scholars, and an absence of an objective standard theoretical framework.

In 2010, Tom Hazeldine argued in an article published in the New Left Review that the ICG "styles itself as independent and non-partisan, but has consistently championed NATO's wars to fulsome transatlantic praise". A 2007 piece in Foreign Policy described ICG as "liberal" and critical of Venezuelan president Hugo Chávez.

The ICG generated controversy in April 2013 as it awarded Myanmar President Thein Sein its "In Pursuit of Peace Award", with the award ceremony coinciding with the publication of a Human Rights Watch report of ethnic cleansing by Sein's administration.

In 2014, the journal Third World Quarterly published a special issue about the ICG and its role in knowledge production about conflict, featuring 10 separate critiques about the ICG, ranging from its influence on foreign-policy makers, "manufacturing" crises, and the methodologies it deploys in gathering its research. The ICG's briefings and reports were described as having "a generally good reputation" among policymakers in the issue's introduction, which also notes that while academics working on conflict often cite the ICG's analysis, there is little academic research about the ICG itself.

The ICG was criticised in September 2016 for its 2011 report entitled "The Syrian Regime's Slow-motion Suicide", with Nicholas Noe arguing: "Regrettably, ICG's overconfidence in regime suicide not only encouraged the premature and disastrous rejection of diplomacy that has helped prolong the Syria war. It also essentially abdicated the main role for which peace, promotion, and conflict mitigation NGOs exist in the first place: Advocating for strong international engagement and negotiated solutions that regard the safety of civilian populations as paramount".

In 2023, several of ICG's staff, including Ali Vaez, Iran Project Director, were connected to the Iran Experts Initiative.

== General sources ==
- Fifteen Years on the Front Lines 1995–2010. International Crisis Group. 2010. Archived from the original on 2013-03-07.
