= Murray Urquhart =

Scottish painter (1880–1972)

- Born: Murray McNeel Caird Urquhart; April 24, 1880; Kirkcudbright, Scotland
- Died: April 12, 1972 (aged 91); Hindhead, Surrey, England
- Education: Edinburgh School of Art; Slade School of Art; Westminster School of Art; Académie Julian
- Known for: watercolor and oil landscapes and portraits
- Children: Brian Urquhart
- Elected: Royal Society of British Artists

Murray McNeel Caird Urquhart (24 April 1880 – 12 April 1972), commonly known as Murray Urquhart, was a Scottish painter and book illustrator. He was a member of the Royal Society of British Artists. His son, Brian Urquhart, played a significant role in the founding of the United Nations.

== Early life ==
Urquhart was born in Kirkcudbright, Scotland. His parents were Helen Crokat McNeel (née Caird) and Dr. Andrew John Urquhart, a minister in Portpatrick, Wigtownshire. His maternal grandfather was Alexander McNeel Caird who was the procurator fiscal of Wigtownshire. His father died four months before Murray's birth and his mother died two weeks after Murray’s birth. Following his parents' death, he was initially brought up by his grandparents in Portpatrick. He was later taken in by his spinster aunt, Sarah Urquhart, in Edinburgh.

Murray initially studied at the Merchiston Castle School, and briefly became a law student. He then enrolled at the Edinburgh School of Art (now the Edinburgh College of Art). In 1903, he subsequently moved on to study at the Slade School of Art and the Westminster School of Art. There, he was tutored by artist Walter Sickert). Next, he attended the Académie Julian in Paris, where he was tutored by J.P. Laurens for two years.

== Career ==
Urquhart was a watercolorist in the classic British tradition, specializing in landscapes. He also painted landscapes, portraits, and animals in oil. He was known for landscapes with a pointilliste technique. He was inspired by the French impressionists, but did not care for the work of Georges Braque, Henri Matisse, or Pablo Picasso. He firmly believed he would be "one of the world’s preeminent painters".

He exhibited his paintings at the Lefevre Gallery, London Portrait Society, the New English Art Club, the Royal Academy of Arts, the Royal Glasgow Institute of Fine Arts, the Royal Hibernian Academy, the Royal Institute of Painters in Watercolours, the Royal Society of British Artists, and Walker’s Galleries.

At the same time as his career as a painter took off, he began working as an illustrator for the children's book publisher T.C. & E.C. Jack in 1907.

Urquhart was elected to the Royal Society of British Artists in 1914. He also became an active member of the Society of Somerset Artists, becoming a vice-president in 1944 and later Chairman of the group in 1949.

He was dubbed “the century’s least successful painter" by his son, as “he neglected, however, to make any effort to sell his pictures.” However, after his death, many of his paintings came up for auction in London and realized respectable sums. The record price for Urquhart's paintings at auction is $13,318 for The Travelling Circus which was sold at Christie's South Kensington in 2007.

== Personal life ==
Urquhart was a spiritualist who said he could talk to ghosts. In April 1911, Urquhart married schoolteacher Bertha Rendall in Bridport, Dorset. Their first child, Andrew, was born in April 1914, followed by their second, Brian, in February 1919. His son Brian said, “The Great War presented a problem for my father, who would do anything to avoid military service. Was he mortally afraid of violent death? Or did he consider that painting was the only thing that he had the right and obligation to do? In any case, his obsession was such that he would hide, take a false name—anything to escape conscription."

Brian also recalled, “My father was single-minded to a fault. Painting took absolute priority in his life, and his wife and children—not to mention national events and international disasters—were all secondary. He painted during daylight hours wherever he happened to be. What he did for money remained a mystery, except that we evidently had very little of it and lived in a primitive farm cottage without electricity or running water.” In 1925, Urquhart left his wife and children, riding away on his bicycle with his easel and paintbox. He never saw Bertha again.

Two years later, he married Agatha Muriel Anne Snow, his cousin; although he never officially divorced Bertha. He lived outside of London where his two sons from his prior marriage would visit for ten days each year. In the early-mid 1930s he and his new wife lived in Kent, and later moved to Kensington, Somerset, and a retirement home in Alton, Hampshire. He died in 1972 at Hindhead, Surrey at the age of 91.
