= Margery Urquhart =

British policewoman

Margery Urquhart OBE
- Born: 27 August 1912; Patagonia, Chile
- Died: 9 May 2007 (aged 94); Bridge of Don, Scotland
- Education: University of Aberdeen, BSc Agriculture
- Occupations: Police inspector Deputy director of social work Councillor
- Political party: Conservative

Margery Urquhart OBE (27 August 1912 - 9 May 2007) worked as the Deputy Director of Social Work at Grampian Regional Council but unknown to her colleagues she had an earlier career as a Special Branch agent. She was possibly the first female agent to be recruited by Special Branch; furthermore she was the first female officer to become an Inspector in the Surrey Police Force. Urquhart took part in counter-espionage before and during World War II.

== Early life and education ==
Urquhart was born in Patagonia, Chile. Urquhart's parents, Alexander and Betsy Urquhart, were originally farmers in Milton of Culloden, Scotland, who ran a beef business in Chile. Her early education was carried out by her mother on the ranch. When she was 11 years old the family moved back to Milton of Culloden, Inverness.

She attended The University of Aberdeen, graduating in 1935 with a BSc in Agriculture. This achievement made her the first female to graduate with a degree in Agriculture from the University. After her graduation she moved to Hampshire where she worked on a farm.

== Career ==
It was while working on the farm in Hampshire in 1936 that Urquhart decided on a major career shift and subsequently joined the Metropolitan Police Force. She was recruited by the Special Branch and it has been suggested that she was involved in covert work monitoring the IRA. By 1946 she had transferred to the Surrey Police Force and had been promoted to become the first female Inspector in the force.

At this point Urquhart once again decided on a change of career and undertook training as a probation officer. By 1949 she was once again in Aberdeen taking on the role of a children's officer. She was the only full-time employee working in childcare. She was responsible for over 400 disadvantaged children and carried out much pioneering work. By the late 1970s Urquhart had risen to become Deputy Director of Social Services at Grampian Council. Urquhart retired in 1977.

After retiring, Urquhart immediately embarked on a political career as Conservative Councillor for the Aberdeen seat of Hazlehead.

== Honors ==
Urquhart was awarded an OBE in the 1977 New Year Honours.

== Personal life ==
Urquhart had developed a particular interest in mental health and subsequently took on several tasks as a retiree including being director of Seabank House, a care home in Aberdeen, from December 1990 to October 1997. She was also a director of the Aberdeen Association of Social Service from June 1986 to March 1989. She was also a director of Mental Health Aberdeen from October 1989 to October 1990.

She spent her final years in at the Fairview Nursing Home. In 2007, she died in Bridge of Don, Scotland at the age of 94 years.
