= Henry Gauthier-Villars =

French author (1859–1931)

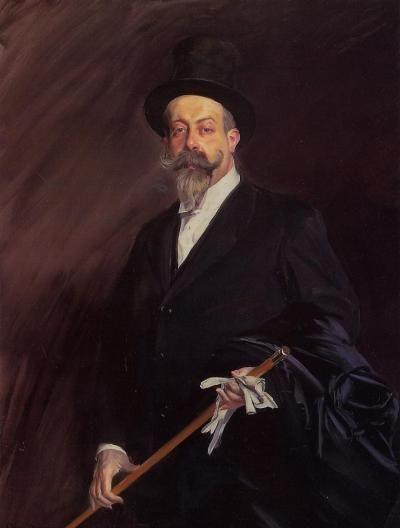
By Giovanni Boldini

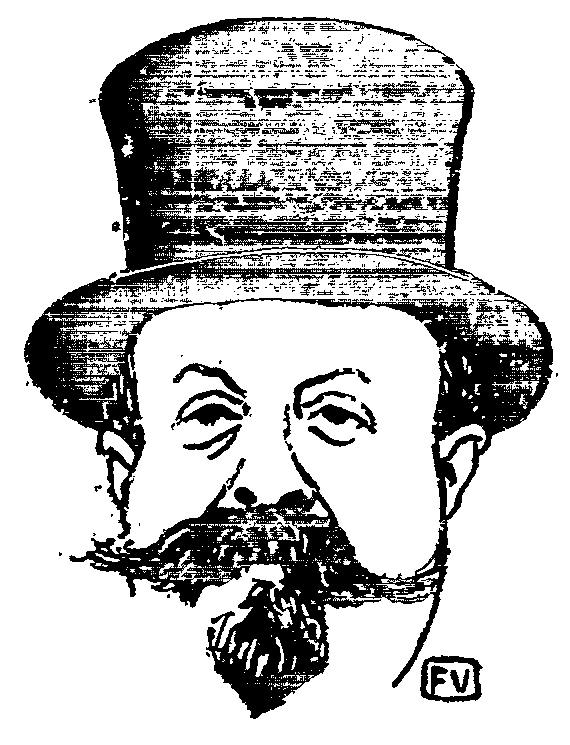
Henry Gauthier-Villars (woodcut by Félix Vallotton)

Henry Gauthier-Villars (8 August 1859 – 12 January 1931), known by the pen name Willy [vili], was a French fin de siècle writer and music critic who is today mostly known as the first husband of Colette. Other pseudonyms used by Gauthiers-Villars are: Henry Maugis, Robert Parville, l’Ex-ouvreuse du Cirque d’été, L’Ouvreuse, L’Ouvreuse du Cirque d’été, Jim Smiley, Henry Willy and Boris Zichine.

== Biography ==
Born on 8 August 1859 in Villiers-sur-Orge, Essonne into a bourgeois Catholic family, he attended the Lycée Fontanes and later the Jesuit Collège Stanislas in Paris. He became fluent in Latin and German. In 1885, he obtained a law degree and subsequently started with a job in the family's publishing firm of Gauthier-Villars.

Willy was a ladies’ man; Rachilde described him "as a man of the world, a brilliant Parisian rake". In 1889, he met Colette, 14 years younger than he was; they married on 15 May 1893. As a writer and music critic he was an incessant and effective self-promoter, under whose directions his "slaves" wrote articles and novels. His ghostwriters may or may not have received recognition but participated because publication under the Willy name secured a high publication rate and good income. With his literary workshops, Willy published more than 50 novels. Curnonsky was one of his ghostwriters, as was his fellow gastronomist Marcel Boulestin. His participation varied and included conceptualizing, editing, and adding sections, plots, and puns. Henry's favourite song, which he could often be heard singing on his way to dinner, was "I'm Henery the Eighth".

Colette was initially handling his correspondence, but soon became involved in writing on her own starting with Claudine, her first work under the Willy label. The success led to more novels in the Claudine series. It is generally acknowledged that these books were written by Colette, but he had his hand in editing and honing the manuscripts. Willy also went into merchandizing dolls and other items based on the Claudine novels.

Colette soon learned that Willy had other affairs, and she met his mistress Charlotte Kinceler, who later became her friend. Later, Willy and Colette had an affair unbeknownst to each other with the same woman, the American socialite Georgie Raoul-Duval, née Urquhart. Upon discovery, they made it a threesome and attended the Bayreuth festival together.

The marriage to Colette lasted until 1910, although they separated in 1906. While Willy made a lot of money, he squandered it with ease on women and gambling and was facing bankruptcy. Willy went on to marry Marguerite Maniez, also known as Meg Villars after her marriage. He had no children from his two marriages; his son, Jacques, was the offspring from a prior affair. Willy died on 12 January 1931 in Paris. Three thousand mourners followed his casket to the Montparnasse cemetery.

In 1905, Willy was painted by Giovanni Boldini.

== In popular culture ==
Willy is played by Dominic West in the 2018 film Colette which stars Keira Knightley in the eponymous role of his first wife.

== Bibliography ==
- Willy, Colette et moi, Sylvain Bonmariage, introduction by Jean-Pierre Thiollet, Anagramme, Paris, 2004 (reprint)
