= Civil Society Movement =

Civil Society Movement تيار المجتمع المدني
- Founded: 1998
- Ideology: Secularism; Civic nationalism Arab nationalism
- Parliament of Lebanon: 0 / 128
- Cabinet of Lebanon: 0 / 30

Website
- http://www.secularist.org

The Civil Society Movement (Arabic: تيار المجتمع المدني, CSM) is a Lebanese political party and movement founded by Grégoire Haddad in 1998.

== Definition and vision ==
The CSM hopes to build free, democratic and secular citizens through the basic principles of secularism, democracy, participation, sovereignty, justice, development, transparency and Arabism, and aims for a fair country built by free citizens that is open to its surroundings and the world. It is based on the principle that a human being has an absolute value.
