= Georgie Raoul-Duval =

American writer (1866–1913)

Georgie Raoul–Duval
- Born: Jeannie Urquhart; 3 July 1866; Paris, France
- Died: November 3, 1913 (aged 47); Paris, France
- Occupations: novelist, playwright
- Spouse: René Raoul–Duval (m. 1891)
- Relatives: Cora Urquhart Brown–Potter (sister)
- Writing career
- Pen name: George Darling; G. R. Duval

Jeannie Urquhart or Georgie Raoul–Duval (3 July 1866 – 3 November 1913) was an American writer, playwright, and socialite. She is mainly remembered for having been in a ménage-a-trois with Colette and Colette's first husband Henry Gauthier–Villars.

== Early life ==
Urquhart was born in the 16th arrondissement in Paris, France during one of the frequent travels of American merchant David Urquhart and his wife Augusta (née Slocomb). She was raised in New Orleans, Louisiana and educated in France.

== Career ==
In 1905, Urquhart began her career as a playwright, using the pen name George Darling. Her sister, actress Cora Urquhart Brown–Potter, produced and acted in her play, The Golden Light, at the Savoy Theatre in London in 1905. However, the production was not successful and closed in a few days.

Using the pen name G. R. Duval, she published three books. Shadows of Old Paris, published in 1910, described Paris for Americans. Her next novel, Written in the Sand, was published in 1912 and was inspired by a journey to the Sahara. Published posthumously in 1914, Little Miss, An Unfinished Story featured a young protagonist from Louisiana.

== Personal life ==
Urquhart married René Raoul–Duval, mining engineer and heir to a large industrial and mining fortune, on September 23, 1891, in Paris. Her dowry was $200,000 francs; his income was a million francs. After the marriage, Urquhart changed her name to Georgie Raoul-Duval. The couple had a house in Paris where she was a "fixture" in artistic salons, frequenting them while her husband was away on business. In addition to their place in French society, the couple was also part of the high society in the United States."

Starting in March 1901, she started an affair with Colette. Colette wrote, “ I loved her, if love is to desire until it burns...to dream of running away with her..." She then also became the lover of Colette's husband Henry Gauthier–Villars. Neither of her lovers knew about each other. Finally, she was the lover of both of them, as detailed in a Paris police report of 1 May 1901. The police report said, "We learn that the novelist Gauthier–Villars (Henry) says 'Willy', author of Claudine in Paris, 93 rue de Courcelles has been living on 93 rue de Courcelles for five years, and has chosen for the afternoon of 29 April a small apartment on the fourth floor of a discreet house on Pasquier Street, with the aim of meeting two lesbians, his legitimate wife and a lady aged about thirty, remaining 107 rue de la Pompe [address of the Raoul–Duval]. The meeting of the novelist and the two ladies in question took place from three to six o'clock in the evening. Arriving first, the two ladies were left alone for an hour but Mr. Gauthier–Villars had come to join them, so they continued with him the game."

The burial site of Raoul-Duval

The trio drove to Bayreuth, Germany for the Bayreuth Festival in the summer of 1901, but fell apart after returning to Paris when Colette and Gauthier–Villars realized that they had both been seeing Urquhart away from their ménage à trois. Colette's revenge was literary. Although Urquhart tried to stop the book from being published for fear of scandal, Colette thinly fictionalized Urquhart as Rézi in Claudine en ménage (Claudine Married) in 1902. Urquhart then purchased the entire first run of the book and had it destroyed. She also ended her association with the couple. Urquhart also appeared as Suzy in Colette's La Retraite sentimentale (The Sentimental Retreat).

Urquhart went on to have an affair with the writer Marie de Hérédia, wife of Henri de Régnier and mistress of Pierre Louÿs. Her other lovers were José Maria Sert and Catherine Pozzi.

In 1913, she died at her home on 27 Quai d'Orsay in Paris at the age of 47.

== Popular culture ==
- Colette fictionalized George Raoul-Duvawent as the Austrian girl Rézi in Claudine en ménage, the third episode of her Claudine series.
- Colette caricatured George Raoul-Duvawent again as Suzy in La Retraite sentimentale in 1907.
- Jean Cocteau modeled the mother in his novel Les Parents terribles after her.
- Édouard Bourdet, who depicted her as Madame d'Aiguines in his 1926 play La Prisonernière.
- She was played by Eleanor Tomlinson in the 2018 film Colette.

== Publications ==
=== Plays ===
- Daring, George. The Golden Light, 1905

=== Novels ===
- G.R. Duval. Shadows of Old Paris. London: F. Griffiths, 1910
- — Written in the Sand. London: W. J. Ham-Smith, 1912
- — Little Miss, An Unfinished Story. Edinburgh: Ballantyne Press, 1914
