= Ian Urquhart =

Canadian journalist

Ian Urquhart was the managing editor of the Toronto Star from 1987 to 1993.

== Early life ==
Urquhart attended McGill University, graduating in 1970.

== Career ==
Urquhart was a city hall reporter for the Toronto Telegram. In 1971, he moved to The Toronto Star where he was a city hall reporter. In 1973, he moved to the Star's Ottawa bureau where he worked as a reporter. Starting in 1975, he was the Ottawa and Washington, D.C. correspondent for Maclean's magazine for five years. In 1980, he rejoined the staff of the Star, serving as Ottawa Bureau Chief.

By 1983, he was promoted to national editor of the Star. That year, the Star won a National Newspaper Award for its coverage of the Brian Mulroney leadership convention. In 1985, the Star promoted him to editorial page editor. He was the Star's managing editor between 1987 and 1993.

After 1993, he returned to being a columnist for the Star, writing about Queen's Park. In 2007, he returned to overseeing the newspaper's editorial page.
