= Paul Ingram (nuclear disarmament expert) =

Nuclear disarmament expert

Paul Ingram is a former Senior Fellow of the British American Security Information Council (BASIC), a think tank focusing on nuclear disarmament based in London and Washington, D.C. He lives in London with his wife and two children.

== Career ==
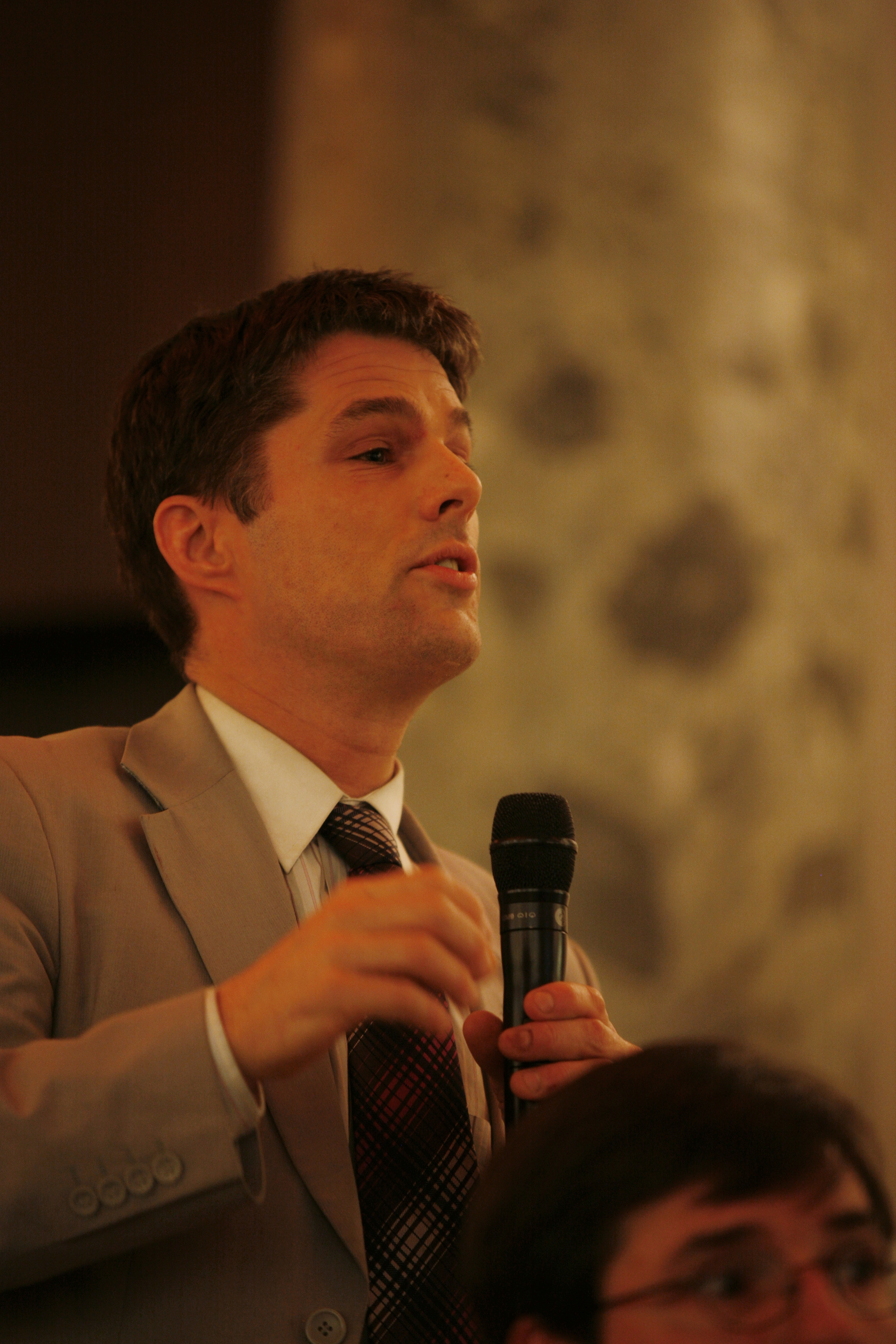
Paul Ingram, Executive Director of BASIC

Paul has for many years been working and writing on the global nuclear disarmament debate and transatlantic security, specifically on issues relating to the UK nuclear weapons system, UK–US transatlantic security, NATO's nuclear posture, Iran's nuclear programme, nuclear proliferation politics in the Middle East, and U.S./Russia bilateral arms reduction treaties. He was the originator and developer of the Stepping Stones Approach to nuclear disarmament that underpins the sixteen-nation Stockholm Initiative of non-nuclear weapon states formed in 2019, a platform to achieve concrete progress within nuclear disarmament diplomacy. He also works with the Middle East Treaty Organization (METO) to promote the establishment of a regional zone free of weapons of mass destruction.

Paul was Executive Director of the British American Security Information Council 2007-2019, and led BASIC's work in the UK debate on Trident renewal, developing narratives for nuclear non-proliferation in the Middle East, and engaging with officials in Europe and within NATO to reduce reliance on nuclear weapons and extended deterrence. His work includes an assessment of the Trident Alternative Review and Trident in UK Politics and Public Opinion, analysis of further nuclear reduction negotiations with Russia and a summary of prospects for nuclear non-proliferation in the Middle East.

From 1990 to 2002, Paul worked as a researcher and Project Leader for the Oxford Research Group before joining BASIC as an analyst in 2002 and being appointed Co-Executive Director in November 2007, and Executive Director in April 2008. In January 2008 he also started hosting a peak-time talk show each Friday evening on Iranian national television broadcast in Persian in Iran (IRINN), a post he held for 5½ years until July 2012. From February 2008 Paul also taught Systems Approaches at the UK government's National School of Government as core element of its flagship three-week Top Management Programme for senior civil servants until the National School was closed in 2012. Before joining BASIC, Paul was involved in local politics for the Green Party in Oxford; he was elected the first Green vice-president to Oxford University Student Union for 1998-1999, and later served as Green city councillor for Central Ward (1996-2002) and co-leader of the Oxford City Council (2000-2002) in a joint Green–Liberal Democrat administration. In 2004, he was election coordinator for the London Euro, Mayoral and Assembly elections, and was second on the Green list in the European Election. He was also Warden of Oxford Quaker Meeting House 1994-1997, and has served on the Quaker Council for European Affairs and several national Quaker committees. He received his BA in Philosophy, Politics and Economics from the University of Oxford in 1990.

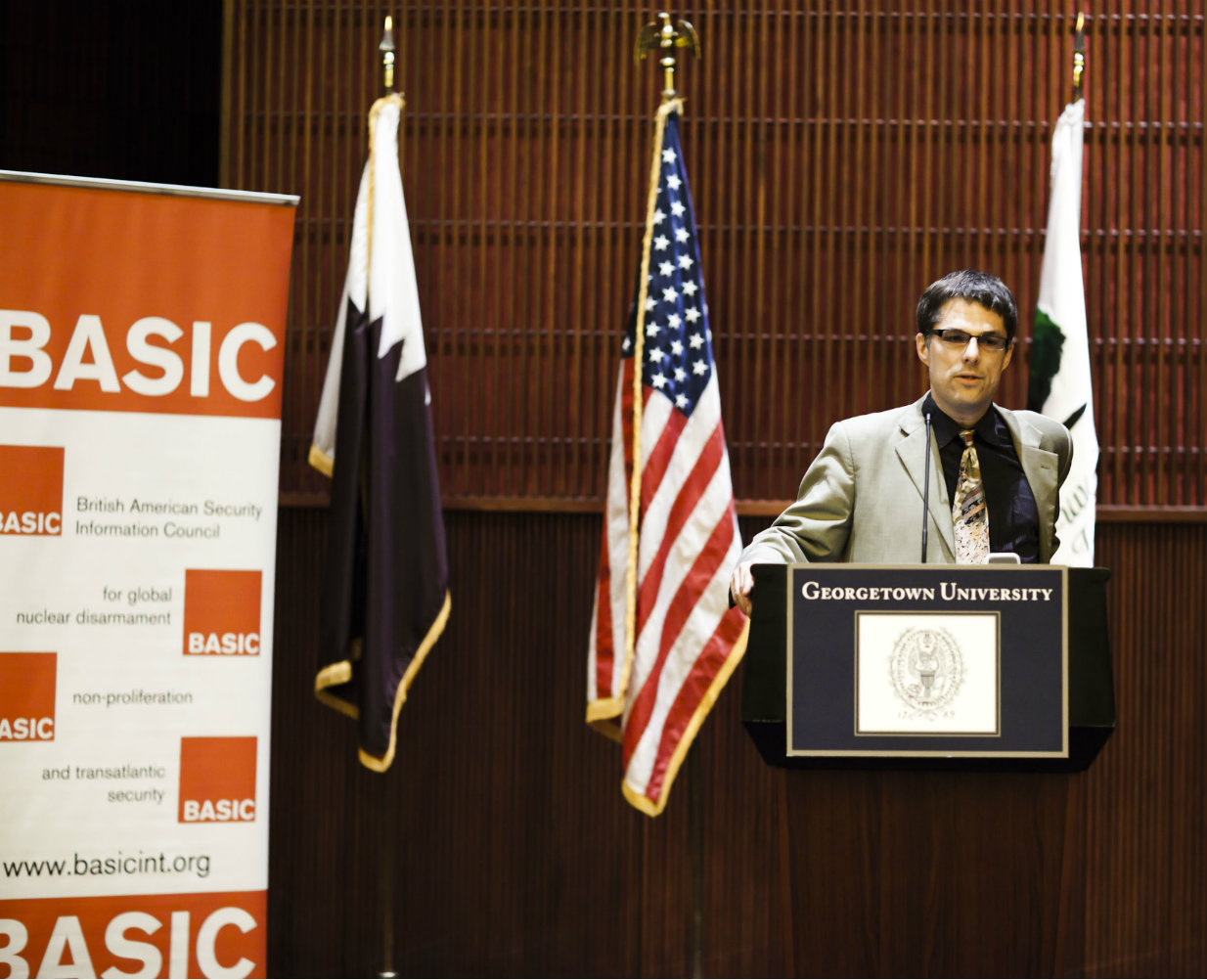
Paul Ingram at BASIC's conference on nuclear non-proliferation in the Gulf, March 2012
