= Cora Urquhart Brown-Potter =

American actress (1857–1936)

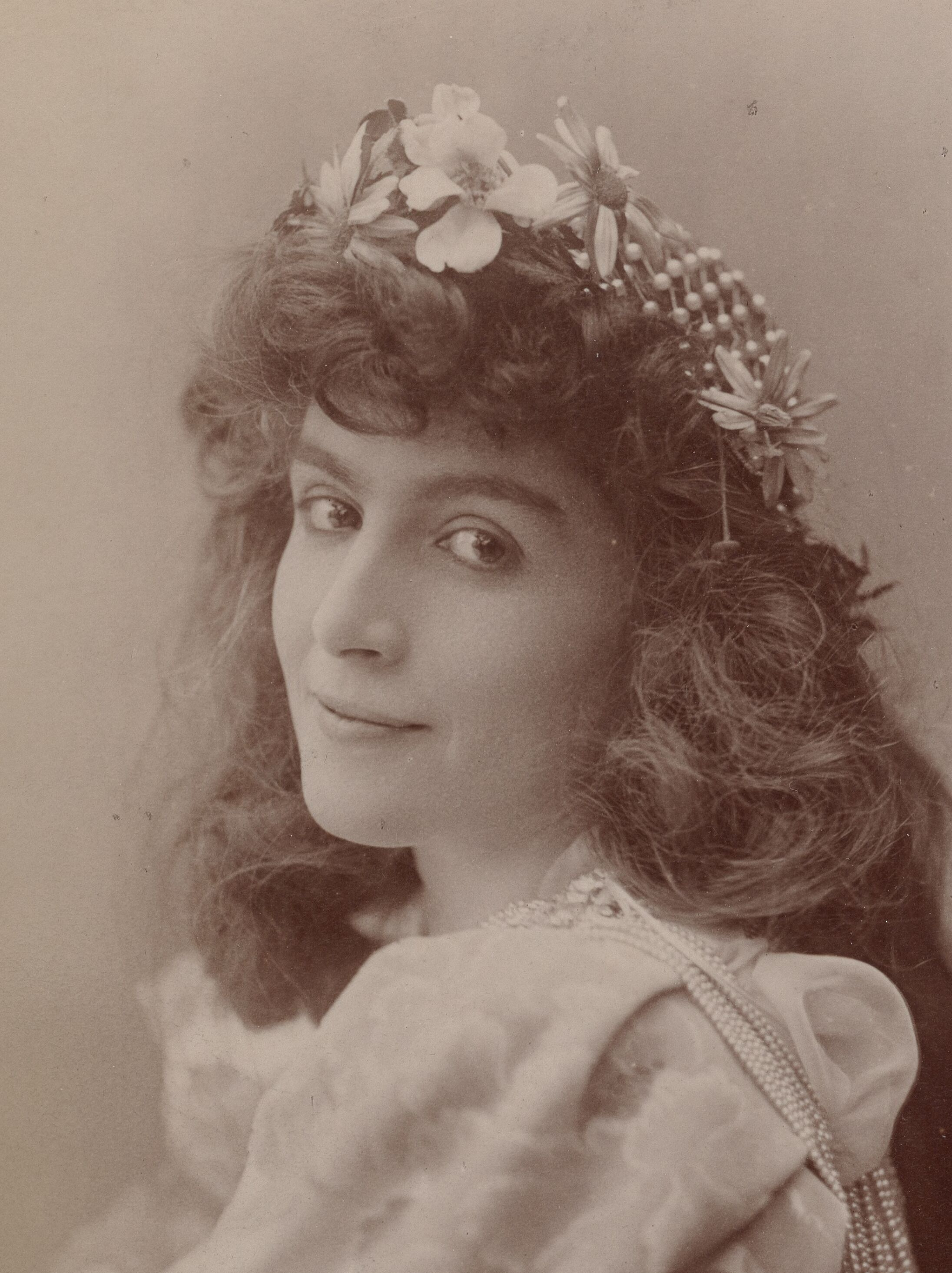
- Born: Mary Cora Urquhart; May 15, 1857; New Orleans, Louisiana, U.S.
- Died: February 12, 1936 (aged 78); Beaulieu-sur-Mer, French Third Republic
- Other name: Mrs. Brown-Potter
- Occupation: Actress
- Spouse: James Brown Potter (m. 1877; div. 1900)
- Children: 1

Mary Cora Urquhart or Cora Brown-Potter (May 15, 1857 – February 12, 1936) was an American actress who found success in London. Formerly a member of The Four Hundred in New York, she was one of the first American society women to become a stage actress.

== Early life ==
Urquhart was born and raised in New Orleans, Louisiana. She was the first of four children of Augusta (née Slocomb) and Col. David Urquhart. Her father was a merchant and her mother the daughter of a hardware merchant. Because her family was affluent, she was privately educated.

When she was eighteen years old, Urquhart married coffee broker James Brown Potter on December 7, 1877. Potter was employed by Brown Bros. & Co. and was the son of Howard Potter. They had a daughter, Anne "Fifi" Urquhart Potter, in 1879.

Urquhart was in demand at New York society parties and dinners for her beauty and skills at recitation, soon rising to inclusion in The Four Hundred. The Brown–Potters visited England in the summer of 1886. While attending a palace ball, she met the George Frederick Ernest Albert, Prince of Wales, who invited the couple to spend the weekend Sandringham House.

James returned to the United States with their daughter Fifi, while Cora remained in England to pursue a career on stage. At the time, the stage was not a suitable profession for a lady of wealth, and her husband did not approve of her decision. As one biographer noted, "She had long harboured a desire to be an actress and abandoned her husband [and child] to follow her heart."

== Career ==
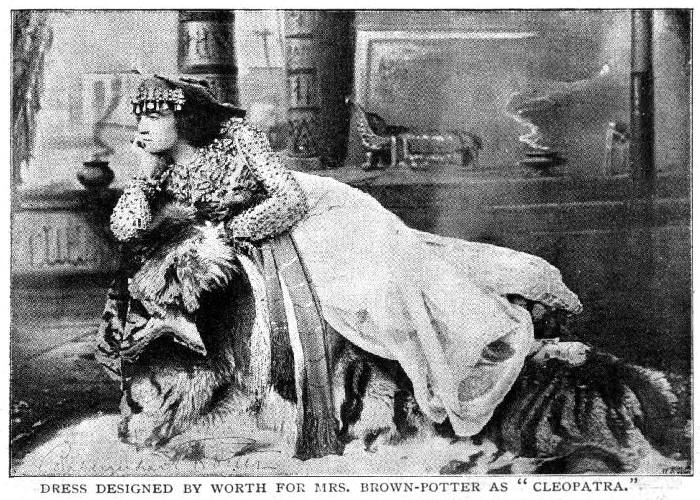
As Cleopatra, 1894

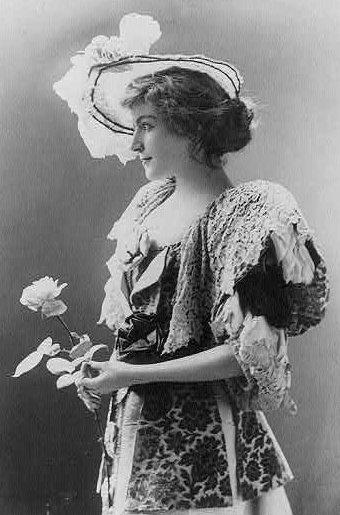
1895

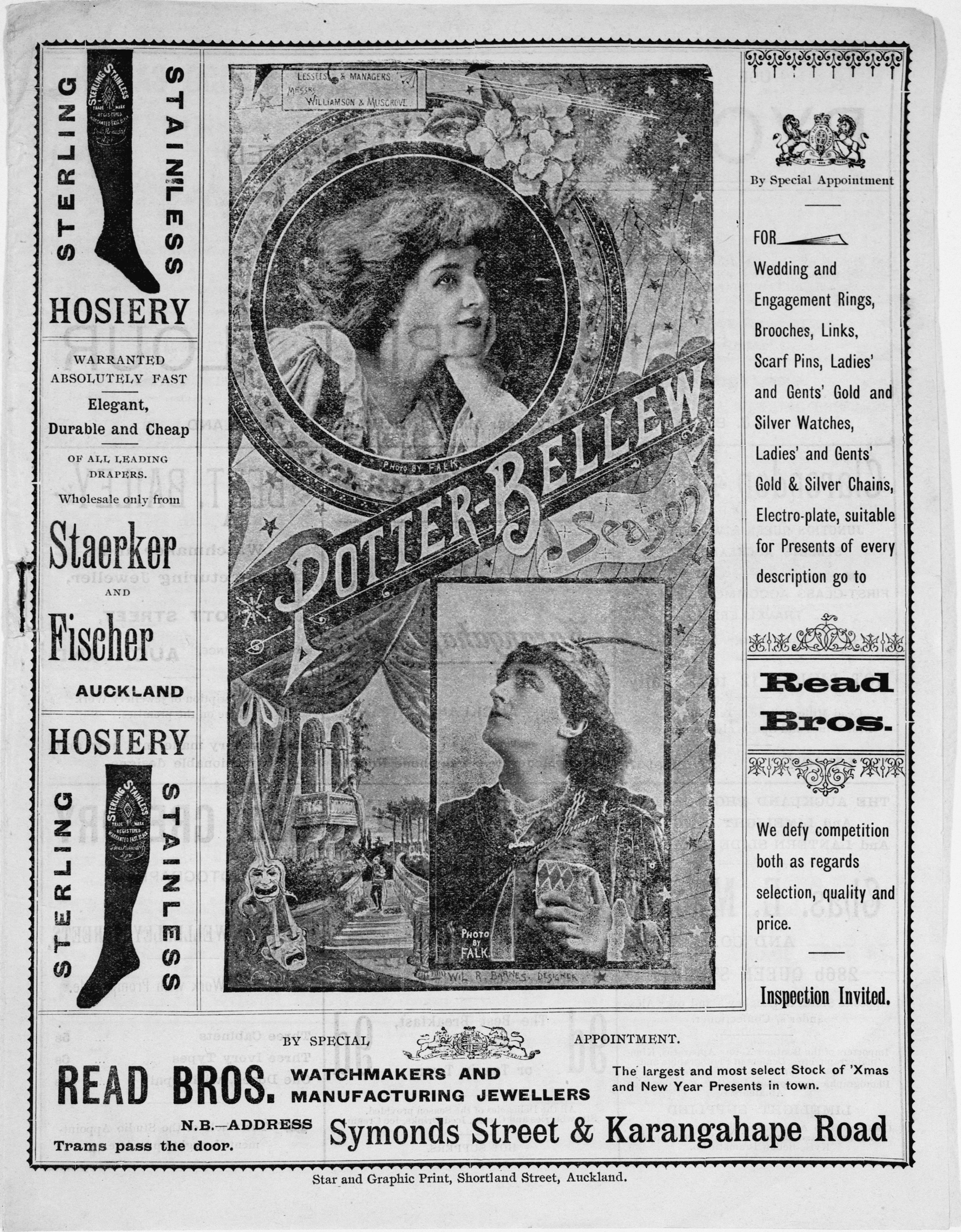
Program, Opera House, Auckland, New Zealand, 1897

In March 1887, Urquhart made her stage debut at the Theatre Royal in Brighton as Faustine de Bressier in the play Civil War. In the same month, she made her West End of London debut in Man and Wife at the Theatre Royal, Haymarket. She reprised her roles in Civil War at the Gaiety Theatre in the West End, followed by the role of Inez in Loyal Love at the Gaiety.

In March 1887 under the moniker "Anonymous," Oscar Wilde wrote for The Court and Society Review, "With regard to Mrs. Brown–Potter, as acting is no longer considered absolutely essential for success on the English stage, there is really no reason why the pretty bright-eyed lady who charmed us all last June by her merry laugh and her nonchalant ways, should not—to borrow an expression from her native language—make a big boom and paint the town red. We sincerely hope she will; for, on the whole, the American invasion has done English society a great deal of good. American women are bright, clever, and wonderfully cosmopolitan."

In October 1887, she returned to the United States to perform Civil War, along with British actor Harold Kyrle Bellew, at the Fifth Avenue Theatre in New York. The duo also performed Charlotte Corday and Romeo and Juliet while in New York. Of the latter, one American critic noted, "Mrs. Potter of course played the leading part, and played it badly." However, Urquhart and Bellew began a successful partnership for ten years, performing together in America, Australia, China, England, and India. During this time, she was Hero in Hero and Leander, Floria in La Tosca, Juliet in The Lady of Lyons, Kate in She Stoops to Conquer, and the title role in Francillon. She also performed as Camille and Rosalind.

In 1887, she published My Recitations, a collection of poems she had previously recited at social functions. In 1889, she played the role of Cleopatra and launched "a mania for Egyptian styles". She had the title role in Charlotte Corday at the Adelphi Theatre in the West End in 1898. The critic from the Daily Mail wrote, "For Mrs. Brown-Potter, in loveliness and picturesque bearing the very 'Angel of Assassination,' delivers every sentence in tragic recitative, and thus each moment removes the character still farther from the confines of humanity."

In 1898, she left Bellew to work with Beerbohm Tree at Her Majesty's Theatre, performing as Miladi in The Musketeers and as Oliver Arnison in Carnac Sahib. In September 1899, she again collaborated with Bellew in The Ghetto at The Comedy Theatre in London's West End. However, Bellew then took a year off to seek gold in Australia with great success.

In 1901, she performed in Nicandra at the Avenue Theatre, and Mrs. Willoughby's Kiss at the Theatre Royal Brighton. She again worked with actor Beerbohm Tree, playing Calypso in Ulysses at the Theatre Royal, Haymarket. Next, she was in For Church or Stage in Yarmouth and Forget-me-not and Cavalleria Rusticana at the King's Theatre, Hammersmith. She and Tree gave a command performance of A Man's Shadow at Windsor Castle in November 1904.

In September 1904, Urquhart took on managing the Savoy Theater, former home of Gilbert and Sullivan who were no longer a team. She opened with The Golden Light, a play written by her sister Georgie Raoul-Duval as George Darling. However, the play was unpopular with critics and audiences, closing after a few days. Some of the other plays Urquhart produced and starred in at the Savoy include Du Barry and Pagliacci, along with revivals of Cavalleria Rusticana, For Church or Stage, and Forget-me-not. Unfortunately for Urquhart, the Savoy Theatre was in declined before her management, and she was not successful in reviving its cash flow.

Urquhart left theater management and toured music halls in Mary Queen of Scots and the Murder of Rizzio. She toured in South Africa in 1907, followed by several years in the English provinces with plays such as The Devil, Lady Frederick, and Madame X. In 1911, she performed in the United States. Her last appearance on the London stage at the Court Theatre in February 1912, performing the "Prologue" to Buddha. She made an additional stage appearance in 1919 for a benefit production in Guernsey.

== Personal life ==
During the Second Boer War of 1899 to 1902, she raised funds to help charities care for victims.

Potter divorced Urquhart on June 4, 1900, on the grounds of "desertion for more than five years and living apart for more than ten years" and remarried in 1904. However, she continued to use his name as her stage name. She lived in London where she replicated her popularity with New York society, running with a crowd that included poet and playwright Robert Browning and the Prince of Wales.

In 1912, she brought her mother to England and they lived at Staines on the Thames in a stone house that had previously served as a lodge of Windsor Castle. In 1936, she died at her villa in Beaulieu-sur-Mer at the age of 78 years,

== See also ==
- Mary Anderson
- Mrs. Leslie Carter
- Mrs. Patrick Campbell
