= British American Security Information Council =

American and UK think tank

The British American Security Information Council
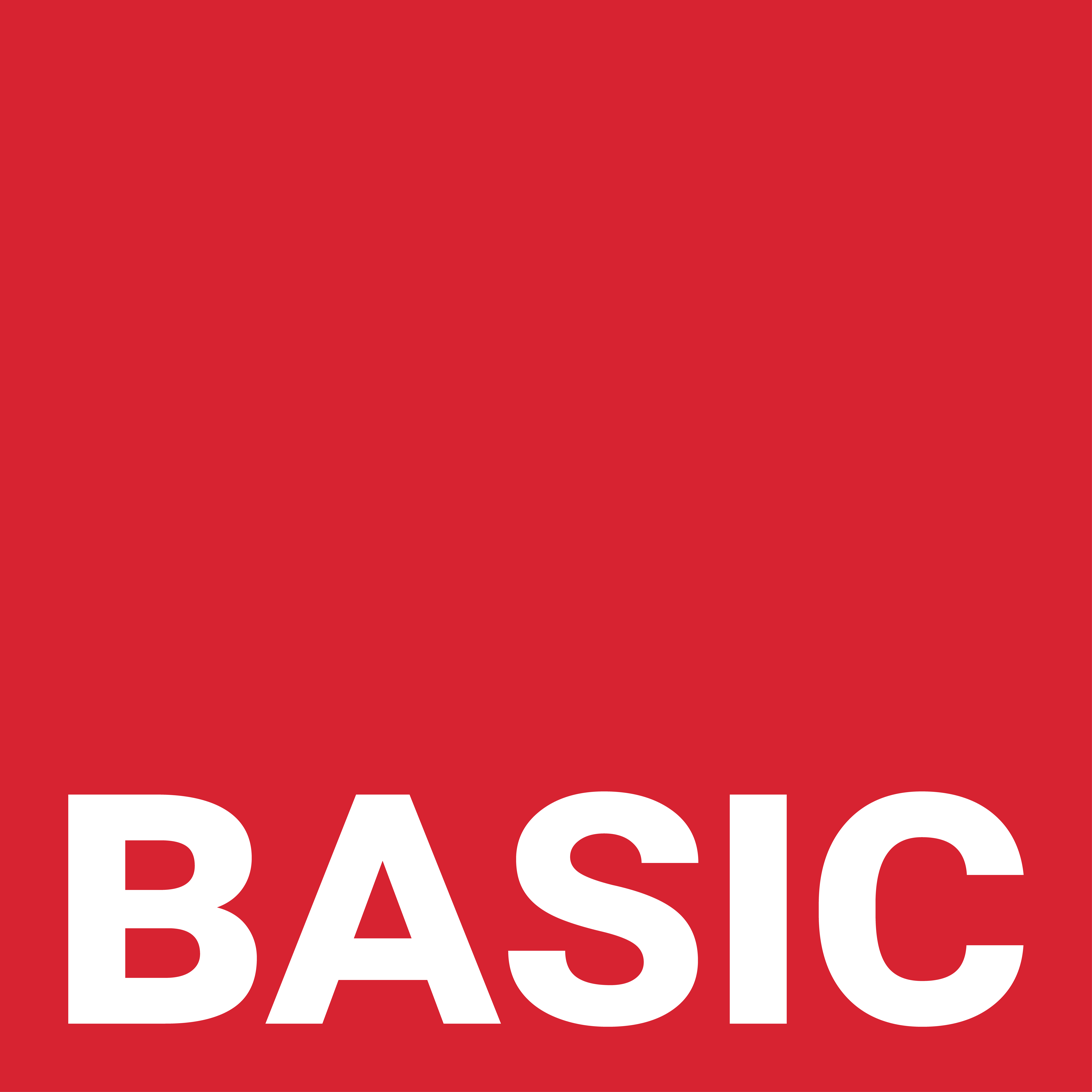
- Abbreviation: BASIC
- Formation: 1986
- Founder: Dan Plesch
- Type: Think tank
- Headquarters: 111 Seven Sisters Rd, Finsbury Park, London. N7 7FN
- Coordinates: 51.561219°N 0.113543°W
- Executive Director: Sebastian Brixey-Williams
- Employees: 16
- Website: www.basicint.org

The British American Security Information Council (BASIC) is a nonpartisan think tank headquartered in London. BASIC works at the intersection of policymakers, academia, and civil society to promote nuclear disarmament and non-nuclear proliferation. It was founded in 1986 simultaneously in London and Washington, D.C., United States.

== Mission ==
Safeguard humanity and Earth's ecosystem from nuclear risks and interconnected security threats, for generations to come.

== Vision ==
Reaching a global security consensus founded on multilateralism, the recognition of the indivisibility of security, an adherence to Earth's planetary boundaries, and the consideration of future generations

== History ==
The British American Security Information Council, BASIC, was established in 1986, during a crucial turning point of the Cold War. The previous year, Ronald Reagan and Mikhail Gorbachev had met in Geneva for their first summit in November 1985, signaling a potential thaw in superpower relations after years of heightened tensions. This meeting laid the groundwork for serious arms control negotiations that would reshape the nuclear landscape of Europe.

BASIC emerged at this pivotal moment to foster transatlantic dialogue on nuclear weapons policy and security issues. Founded by policy experts and activists on both sides of the Atlantic, the organisation sought to bridge the gap between American and British perspectives on nuclear policy, providing independent research and analysis during a period when public concern about nuclear weapons reached its peak. The organisation set up two offices – one in Washington DC and one in London – each equipped with a fax machine, sending information backwards and forwards across the Atlantic.

The timing proved prescient. In December 1987, the United States and the Soviet Union concluded the Intermediate-Range Nuclear Forces Treaty (INF), which removed an entire class of short- and medium-range nuclear missiles from Europe. This landmark agreement eliminated ground-launched ballistic and cruise missiles with ranges between 500 and 5,500 kilometers, addressing the deployment of Soviet SS-20s and American Pershing II and cruise missiles that had sparked massive protests across Europe in the early 1980s.

== Programmes ==
BASIC’s programmes are structured as long-term research and engagement streams aimed at reducing nuclear risks and advancing progress in disarmament, arms control, and nuclear non-proliferation. Developed through sustained dialogue with governments, international organisations, civil society, and technical experts, these programmes enable the organisation to identify practical avenues for cooperation even during periods of geopolitical tension and renewed reliance on nuclear deterrence.

The programme structure is intended to broaden the parameters of nuclear debate by encouraging states and stakeholders to reassess strategic assumptions, consider their responsibilities, and explore opportunities for meaningful risk reduction. BASIC is recognised for its non-partisan and cross-cultural approach, which provides platforms for constructive engagement among diverse actors, including representatives from nuclear-armed states, non-nuclear-weapon states, and regions often underrepresented in global nuclear discussions.

Across its programme areas, BASIC integrates policy research, capacity-building initiatives, and multi-stakeholder dialogue to promote a more stable and inclusive international nuclear order. The programmes also help cultivate new generations of professionals, strengthening long-term international expertise in the management of nuclear risks.

=== Current Programmes ===
As of 2026, BASIC runs four principal programme streams focused on reducing nuclear dangers and fostering cooperative approaches to global security. These include initiatives that support risk reduction, examine state responsibilities, strengthen non-proliferation and disarmament processes, and elevate emerging specialists in the nuclear policy field.

==== Emerging Voices Network ====
The Emerging Voices Network is a global network of early-career technical and policy experts drawn from over 50 nationalities. Through policy-cycle training, masterclasses, peer-to-peer mentoring, and other networking activities, the Network cultivates the next generation of specialists entrusted with the responsibility to manage nuclear threats.

==== Non-Proliferation and Disarmament Programme ====
Working with governments, think tanks, academics and journalists to build momentum for practical, multilateral steps toward nuclear disarmament and arms control. This programme monitors key treaties (such as the Nuclear Treaty on the Non-Proliferation of Nuclear Weapons — NPT — and the Treaty on the Prohibition of Nuclear Weapons — TPNW), promotes transparency frameworks for nuclear-armed states, encourages peaceful uses of civil nuclear technology (advancing sustainable development goals), and supports efforts to secure a robust outcome at the 2026 NPT Review Conference.

==== Responsibilities and Global Governance ====
The programme works on strengthening global security by promoting responsible governance of weapons and dual-use technologies. It shapes international norms and multilateral frameworks through independent research and facilitated dialogues, bringing together governments, experts, industry, and civil society. Drawing on long experience mediating sensitive nuclear discussions, the programme focuses on nuclear weapons, emerging technologies, outer space, and maritime security, with particular attention to South Asia.

==== Risk Reduction Programme ====
This programme monitors strategic relationships among major powers (the P5, the five permanent members of the United Nations Security Council) and between nuclear-weapon states (NWS) and non-nuclear weapon states (NNWS), to assess how shifts in those relationships impact nuclear risks. The aim is to produce timely, practical recommendations to reduce risks and maintain strategic stability, thereby creating conditions more favourable to long-term disarmament.

=== Previous Programmes ===
Over the years, BASIC has conducted several programmes that have since concluded. These earlier initiatives contributed to policy development, public understanding of nuclear issues, and the promotion of dialogue among stakeholders. Among those past programmes were:

- The All-Party Parliamentary Group (APPG) on Global Security and Non-Proliferation (2000-2024)
- Achieving a Weapons of Mass Destruction Free Zone in the Middle East (2018-2019)
- Iran’s Nuclear Program (2003-2018)
- Transatlantic Security
- Technological Risk (2015-2017)
- Talking Trident Event Series(2014-2015)
- The Trident Commission (2011-2014)
- Rethinking Nuclear Weapons (2007-2008 and 2013)
- Strategic Dialogues (2012-2013)
- Joint Project: Reducing the Role of Tactical Nuclear Weapons in Europe (2010-2014)
- Shadow NATO Summits (2009, 2010, 2012 and 2018)

== Projects ==
BASIC has already had projects related to the UK Trident nuclear weapons debate, non-proliferation in the Middle East, and reframing the nuclear weapons debate. BASIC provided the Secretariat to the All-Party Parliamentary Group on Global Security and Non-Proliferation from its formation in 2000 until 2024. BASIC published the final report of the Trident Commission in July 2014, an independent and cross-party commission, co-chaired by Lord Browne of Ladyton, Sir Malcolm Rifkind, and Sir Menzies Campbell, examining the complexity of issues and options facing the UK government in the decision on its nuclear deterrent and its non-proliferation policy. The report recommended the continuation of the British nuclear program, conditional upon a number of actions needed to mitigate the negative impacts.

In partnership, BASIC and the Federation of American Scientists were awarded one of seven projects selected by the Carnegie Corporation of New York on October 14, 2025, to receive a grant "to assess the destabilizing impacts of emerging and disruptive technologies on mobile nuclear launch platforms, specifically land-based and sea-based platforms." James McKeon, the program officer in Carnegie's International Program highlighted the importance of such research: "A dangerous new nuclear arms race is emerging as arms control regimes have become severely weakened and nearly all nine nuclear-armed states continue their intensive nuclear modernization programs."

In November 2025, BASIC convened the conference “Turning Point: Realising a Sustainable Security Architecture for Europe” in Vienna as the concluding event of a multi-year project examining the pressures on Europe’s security environment. The meeting brought together academic experts and senior officials from European foreign and defence ministries to discuss issues such as transatlantic security, the implications of Russo-Ukrainian war, the erosion of the rules-based international order, and the role of climate change as a systemic security risk.

Also in November 2025, BASIC co-organized, together with the Stanley Center for Peace and Security, the “Adventures in Risk Reduction: Oral History Project” training workshop in Istanbul, Turkey. The program brought together a multinational cohort of early-career specialists to receive methodological, ethical, and technical training in the use of oral history to support global efforts to reduce risks posed by weapons of mass destruction. Participants engaged in intensive sessions and were tasked with conducting interviews with senior policymakers as part of a broader initiative on nuclear risk reduction.

== Organization details ==
BASIC has a status of charitable organization in the United Kingdom.

== Funding ==
BASIC is funded through a mix of private donations (from individuals and charitable foundations), philanthropic grants, and project-based funding from various national governments and state agencies. It is a registered charity in England and Wales (no.1001081). Below is a list from their website mentioning some of these donors:

- Department of National Defence (Canada)
- Gender Champions in Nuclear Policy (GCNP)
- Global Affairs Canada
- Harvard Sussex Program (HSP)
- HT & LB Cadbury
- Joesph Rowntree Charitable Trust
- Marmot Charitable Trust
- Ministry of Foreign Affairs (Netherlands)
- Ministry of Foreign Affairs (Norway)
- Ministry for Foreign Affairs (Sweden)
- Network for Social Change
- Ploughshares Fund
- Polden-Puckham Charitable Foundation
- UK Foreign, Commonwealth and Development Office
- University of Glasgow
- United States Department of State

== Board of Trustees ==
Ambassador Thomas Hajnoczi, Balvinder Sangha, Daniel Johnson, Dr Andrew Cottey, Dr Sara Z Kutchesfahani, Dr Togzhan Kassenova, Fawad Dar, Helena Harding, James Madeley, Kameka McLean, Laicie Heeley, Paul Carroll

== See also ==
- List of states with nuclear weapons
- Treaty on the Non-Proliferation of Nuclear Weapons
- Comprehensive Nuclear-Test-Ban Treaty
