= Albert Toris =

French footballer (1925–2022)

Personal information
- Full name: Albert Louis Jules Toris
- Date of birth: 17 September 1925
- Place of birth: Lille, France
- Date of death: 20 March 2022 (aged 96)
- Place of death: Morsang-sur-Orge, France
- Position: Centre-back

Youth career
- Lille

Senior career*
Years	Team	Apps	(Gls)
1946	Angoulême		
1946–1949	CA Paris		
1949–1952	AS Troyes-Savinienne	94	(3)
1952–1953	Monaco	50	(1)
1953–1955	RC Paris	44	(0)
1955–1957	Valenciennes	80	(0)

Managerial career
- 1957–1960: Olympique Saint-Quentin
- 1960–1963: Brest
- * Club domestic league appearances and goals

Albert Toris (17 July 1925 – 20 March 2022) was a French footballer who played as a centre-back for Troyes, Monaco, RC Paris and Valenciennes. He played 59 games en Division 1: 33 with Valenciennes, 12 with RC Paris et 14 with AS Monaco. Toris was born in Lille, Nord, and died in Morsang-sur-Orge (Essonne).
