= Villiers-sur-Orge =

Commune in Île-de-France, France

- Commune
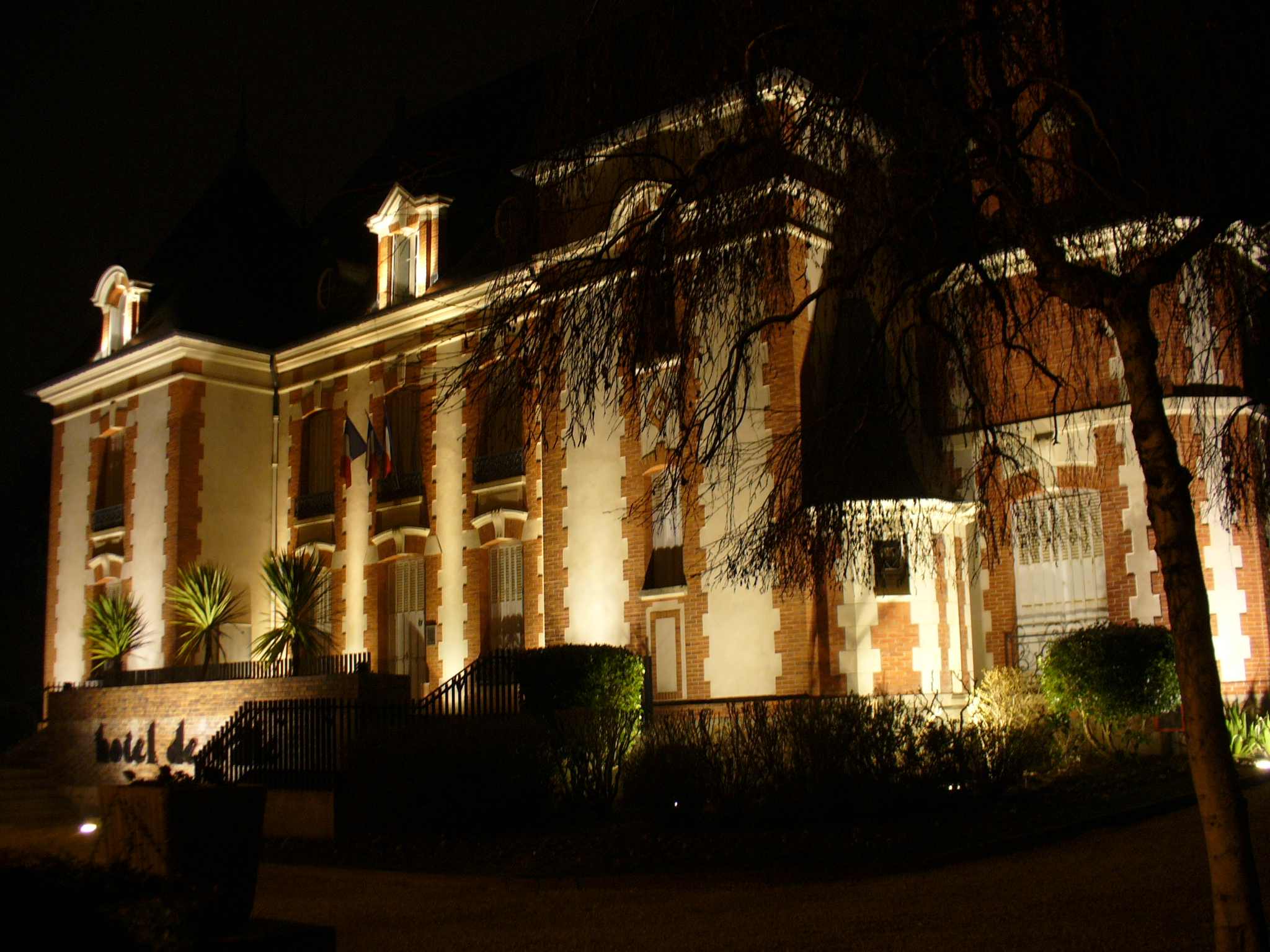
- The town hall in Villiers-sur-Orge

- Coat of arms
- Location of Villiers-sur-Orge
- Location within France Location within Île-de-France (region)
- Coordinates: 48°39′27″N 2°18′00″E
- Country: France
- Region: Île-de-France
- Department: Essonne
- Arrondissement: Palaiseau
- Canton: Sainte-Geneviève-des-Bois
- Intercommunality: CA Cœur d'Essonne

Government
  - Mayor (2020–2026): Gilles Fraysse
- Area^{1}: 1.78 km^{2} (0.69 sq mi)
- Highest elevation: 89 m (292 ft)
- Lowest elevation: 37 m (121 ft)
- Population (2023): 4,545
  - Density: 2,550/km^{2} (6,610/sq mi)
- Demonym: Villiérains
- Time zone: UTC+01:00 (CET)
  - Summer (DST): UTC+02:00 (CEST)
- INSEE/Postal code: 91685 /91700
- Website: www.villiers-sur-orge.fr
- ^{1} French Land Register data, which excludes lakes, ponds, glaciers > 1 km^{2} (0.386 sq mi or 247 acres) and river estuaries.

Villiers-sur-Orge (French pronunciation: [vilje syʁ ɔʁʒ]; lit. 'Villiers-on-Orge') is a commune in the arrondissement of Palaiseau, Essonne department, Île-de-France region, France.

== Population ==
Historical population
| Year | Pop. | ±% p.a. |
|---|---|---|
| 1968 | 2,012 | — |
| 1975 | 2,455 | +2.88% |
| 1982 | 3,298 | +4.31% |
| 1990 | 3,704 | +1.46% |
| 1999 | 3,753 | +0.15% |
| 2007 | 3,917 | +0.54% |
| 2012 | 3,911 | −0.03% |
| 2017 | 4,548 | +3.06% |
| 2023 | 4,545 | −0.01% |
Source: INSEE

Inhabitants of Villiers-sur-Orge are known as Villiérains in French.

== Sites of interest ==
- Town hall
- Saint-Claude chapel

== Location and transport ==
As the name suggests Villiers-sur-Orge is situated on the bank of the small river Orge. The Orge separates Villiers-sur-Orge from neighbouring Sainte-Geneviève-des-Bois.

Villiers-sur-Orge is located in the southern suburbs (banlieue) of Paris, France and can be accessed by car from the Francilienne ring road and the A6 motorway (part of the Autoroute du Soleil). The nearest train station is in neighbouring Sainte-Geneviève-des-Bois (RER line C).

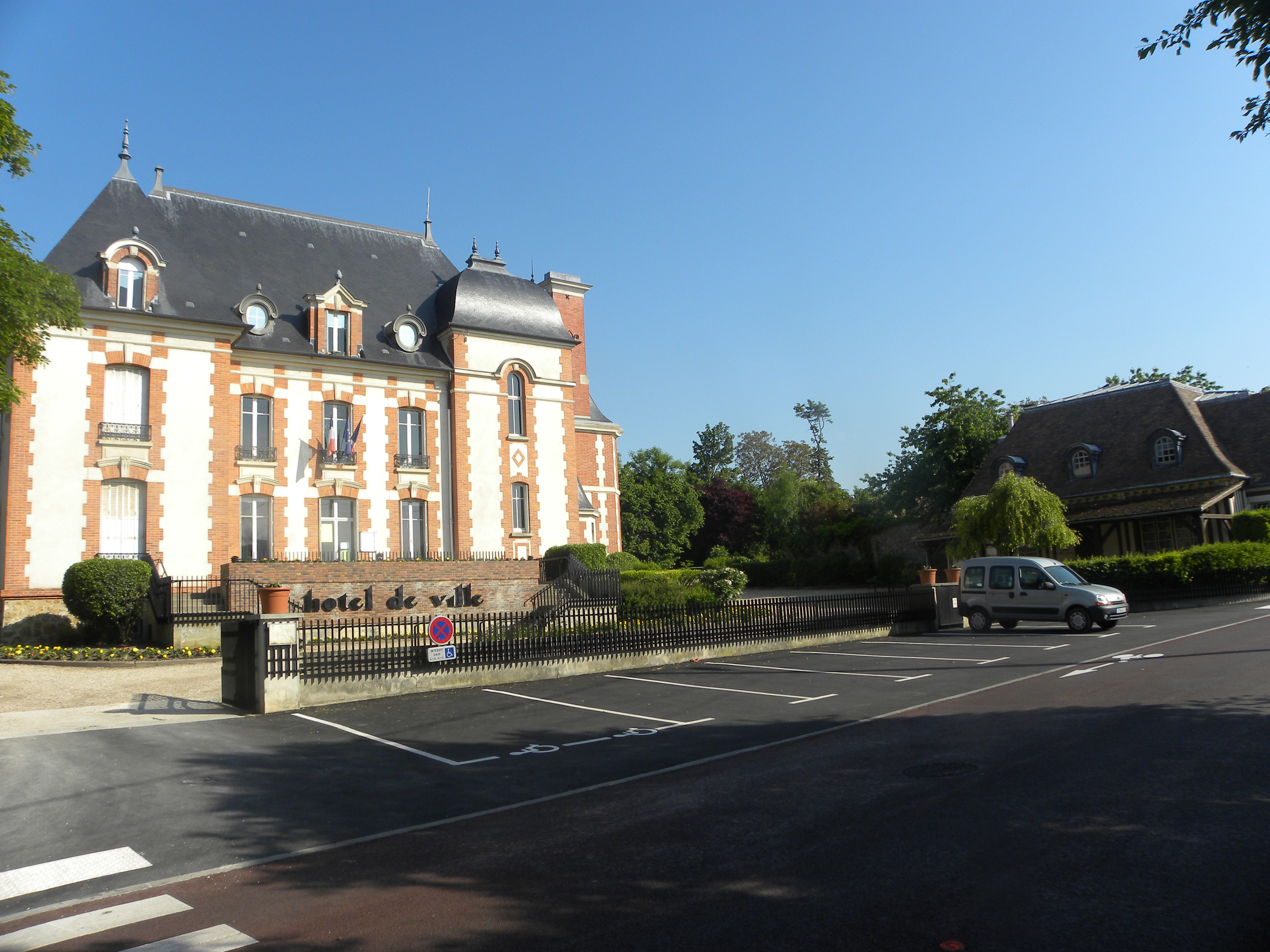
Town Hall

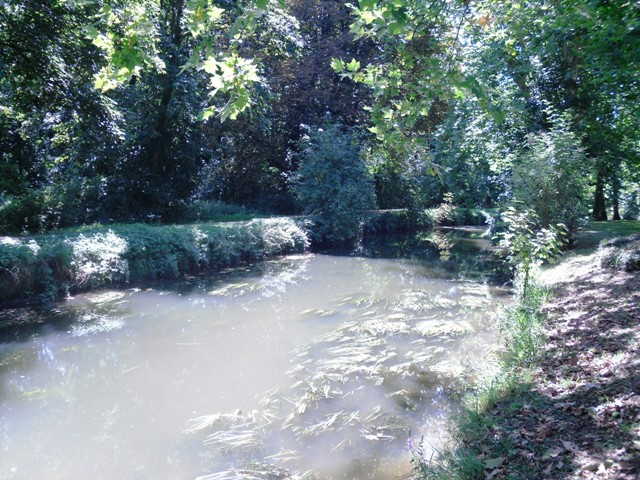
The Orge

== See also ==
- Communes of the Essonne department
