= Canton of Sainte-Geneviève-des-Bois =

Coordinates: 48.64°N 2.33°E

The canton of Sainte-Geneviève-des-Bois is an administrative division of the Essonne department, Île-de-France region, northern France. Its borders were modified at the French canton reorganisation which came into effect in March 2015. Its seat is in Sainte-Geneviève-des-Bois.

It consists of the following communes:

1. Morsang-sur-Orge
2. Sainte-Geneviève-des-Bois
3. Villemoisson-sur-Orge
4. Villiers-sur-Orge
