= Sainte-Geneviève-des-Bois, Essonne =

Commune in Île-de-France, France

Sainte-Geneviève-des-Bois
- Commune
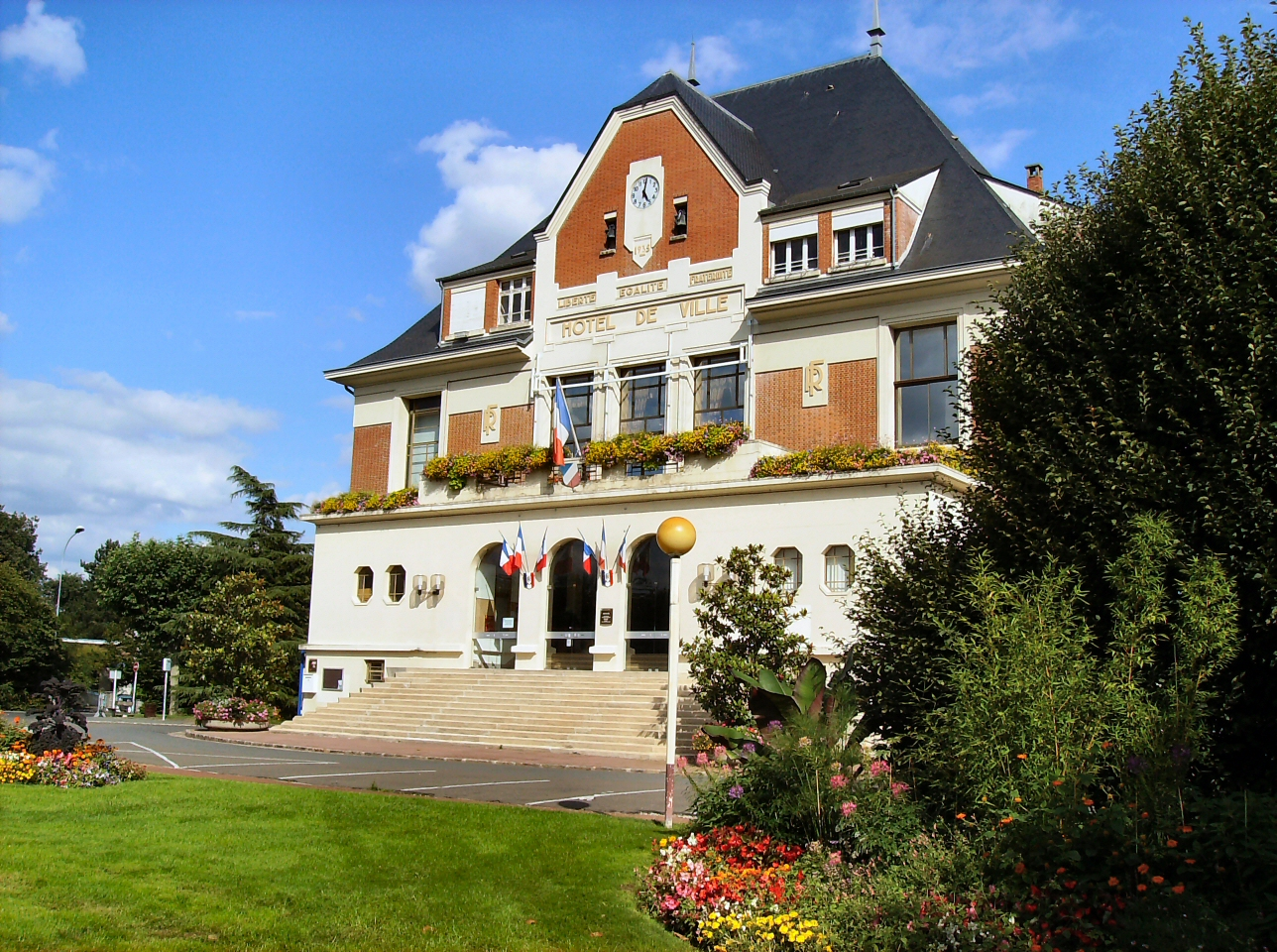
- The Hôtel de Ville

- Coat of arms

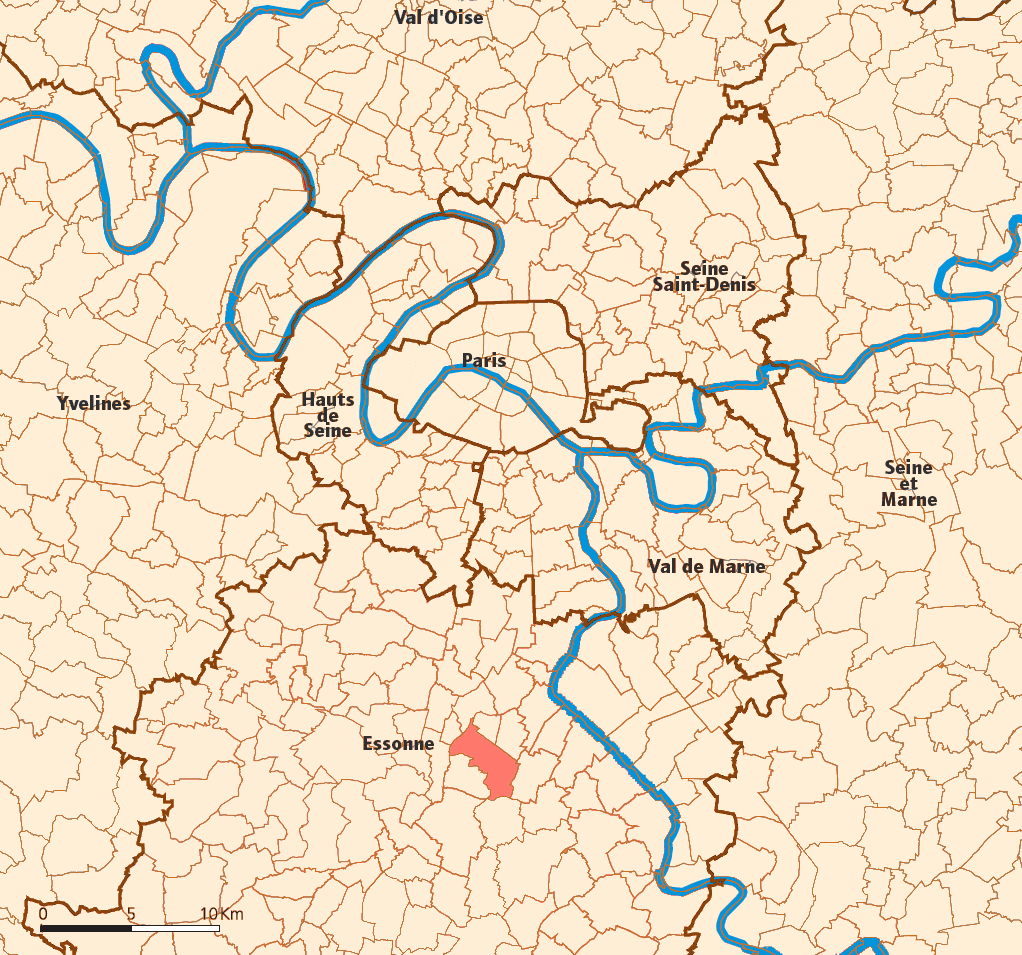
- Location (in red) within Paris inner and outer suburbs
- Location of Sainte-Geneviève-des-Bois
- Location within France Location within Île-de-France (region)
- Coordinates: 48°38′13″N 2°20′25″E
- Country: France
- Region: Île-de-France
- Department: Essonne
- Arrondissement: Palaiseau
- Canton: Sainte-Geneviève-des-Bois
- Intercommunality: CA Cœur d'Essonne

Government
  - Mayor (2020–2026): Frédéric Petitta
- Area^{1}: 9.27 km^{2} (3.58 sq mi)
- Highest elevation: 90 m (300 ft)
- Lowest elevation: 37 m (121 ft)
- Population (2023): 35,438
  - Density: 3,820/km^{2} (9,900/sq mi)
- Time zone: UTC+01:00 (CET)
  - Summer (DST): UTC+02:00 (CEST)
- INSEE/Postal code: 91549 /91700
- ^{1} French Land Register data, which excludes lakes, ponds, glaciers > 1 km^{2} (0.386 sq mi or 247 acres) and river estuaries.

Sainte-Geneviève-des-Bois (French pronunciation: [sɛ̃t ʒənvjɛv de bwa]; lit. 'St Genevieve of the Woods') is a commune in the southern outer suburbs of Paris, France. It is located 23.5 km (14.6 miles) from the centre of Paris, in the arrondissement of Palaiseau, Essonne department, Île-de-France.

== History ==
Inhabitants of Sainte-Geneviève-des-Bois are known as Génovéfains. There has been a settlement in what is now Sainte-Geneviève-des-Bois since Roman times. In 1800 it was still a small settlement with around 100 inhabitants. After the armistice in 1918 the population was counted at less than 800. The boom started in the 1920s when inhabitants of Paris wanted affordable housing. This boom was in part because the railway station of Perray was built, connecting the town to Paris. The population at the moment is over 30.000 inhabitants, making it one of the larger settlements in the Essonne departement.

In 1926 the Château de la Cossonnerie was converted to a retirement home for White émigrés. It is locally known as the Maison Russe. It is still a retirement home but also a centre for Russian Culture. The Hôtel de Ville was completed in 1936.

== Population ==
Historical population

Year	Pop.	±% p.a.
1793	304	—
1800	280	−1.17%
1806	329	+2.72%
1821	320	−0.18%
1831	319	−0.03%
1836	290	−1.89%
1841	304	+0.95%
1846	301	−0.20%
1851	267	−2.37%
1856	296	+2.08%
1861	301	+0.34%
1866	310	+0.59%
1872	319	+0.48%
1876	402	+5.95%
1881	453	+2.42%
1886	494	+1.75%
1891	551	+2.21%
1896	681	+4.33%
1901	648	−0.99%

Year	Pop.	±% p.a.
1906	732	+2.47%
1911	839	+2.77%
1921	886	+0.55%
1926	2,894	+26.71%
1931	5,567	+13.98%
1936	7,390	+5.83%
1946	10,675	+3.75%
1954	11,219	+0.62%
1962	17,660	+5.84%
1968	23,684	+5.01%
1975	31,859	+4.33%
1982	30,439	−0.65%
1990	31,286	+0.34%
1999	32,125	+0.29%
2007	34,411	+0.86%
2012	35,035	+0.36%
2017	36,207	+0.66%
2023	35,438	−0.36%

Source: EHESS and INSEE (1968-2023)

== Notable events ==
In 1963 Carrefour opened its first hypermarket in Sainte-Geneviève-des-Bois, at more than 2 500 square meters the largest in France at the time. This store is still active.

Ilan Halimi, the young French Jew, who was kidnapped and tortured (leading to his eventual death) in 2006 by a group called the Gang of Barbarians, was found in Sainte-Geneviève-des-Bois.

== Tourism ==
Saint-Geneviève-des-Bois does not have an Office du Tourisme nor does the Mairie have tourist facilities. The town has set out a walking tour of the town taking in most of the important places in the town, taking in both the old and the new. Saint-Geneviève-des-Bois has a strong link with the Russian community living in France. The walk passes the Russian Necropolis, considered by some as the most important necropolis of Russian emigrants in the world.

The town offers limited cycling, horse-riding and walking facilities. There is a campsite in neighbouring Villiers-sur-Orge.

== Sights ==
Attractions include the Donjon, a park with animals, the town greenhouse, a grotto, and a Russian Necropolis. There are two main green spaces, the Bois des Trous and a parkland which borders on the river Orge (a tributary of the Seine). There are also some small parks.

== Location ==
Sainte-Geneviève-des-Bois is one of the southern suburbs (banlieue) of Paris, France. It is located 23.5 km (14.6 mi) from the center of Paris and lies just north of junction 42 on the orbital Francilienne autoroute.

== Transport ==
Sainte-Geneviève-des-Bois has an eponymous railway station located on the Paris–Bordeaux railway and the Transilien which in part serves RER line C to Paris.

From the railway station a number of bus lines connect the town to the region: lines CEAT (101, 102, 103, 104 and 105), Daniel Meyer (DM6A and DM17A)

== Sport ==
See Sainte-Geneviève Sports

== Gallery ==
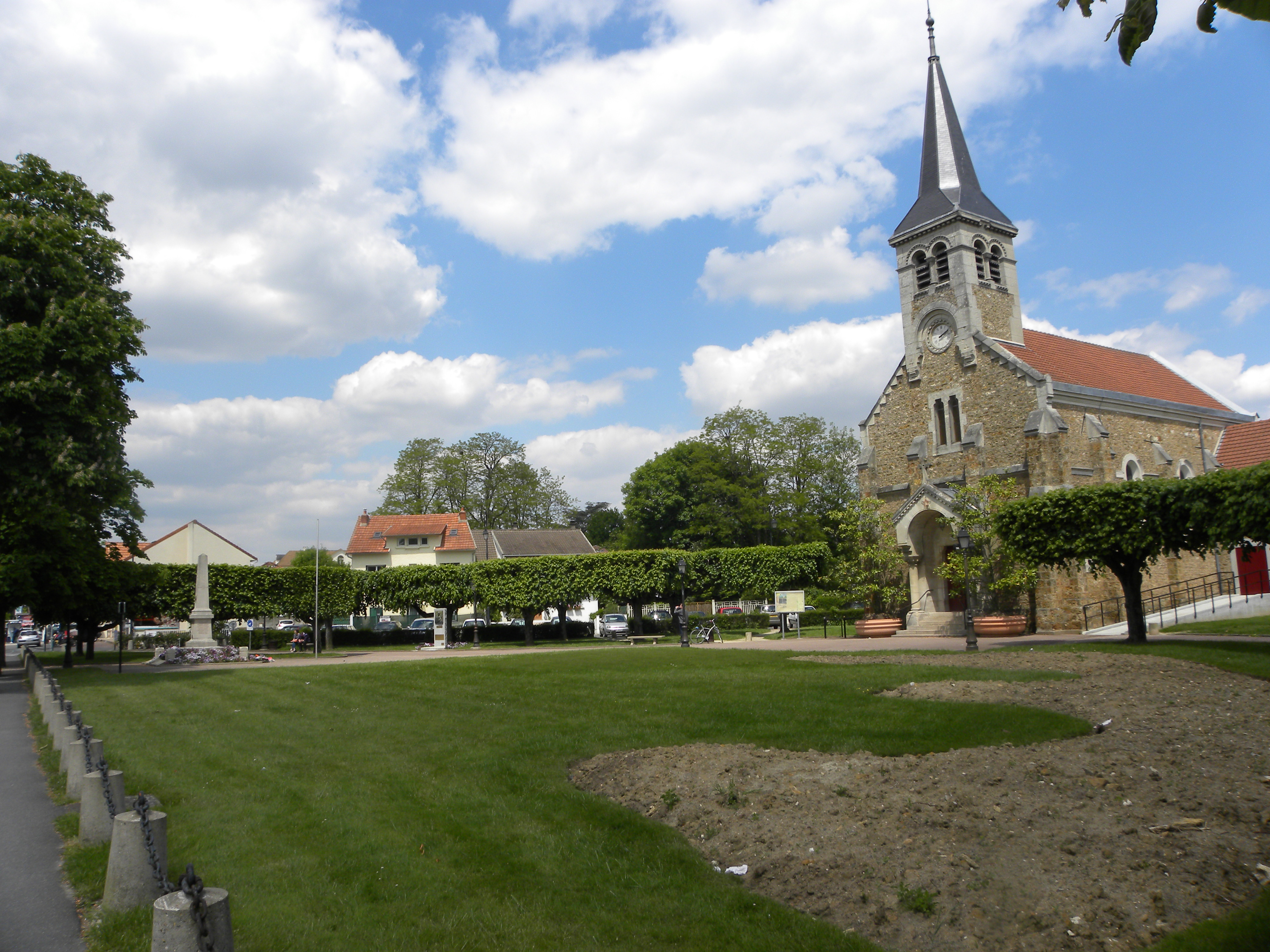
Church and square

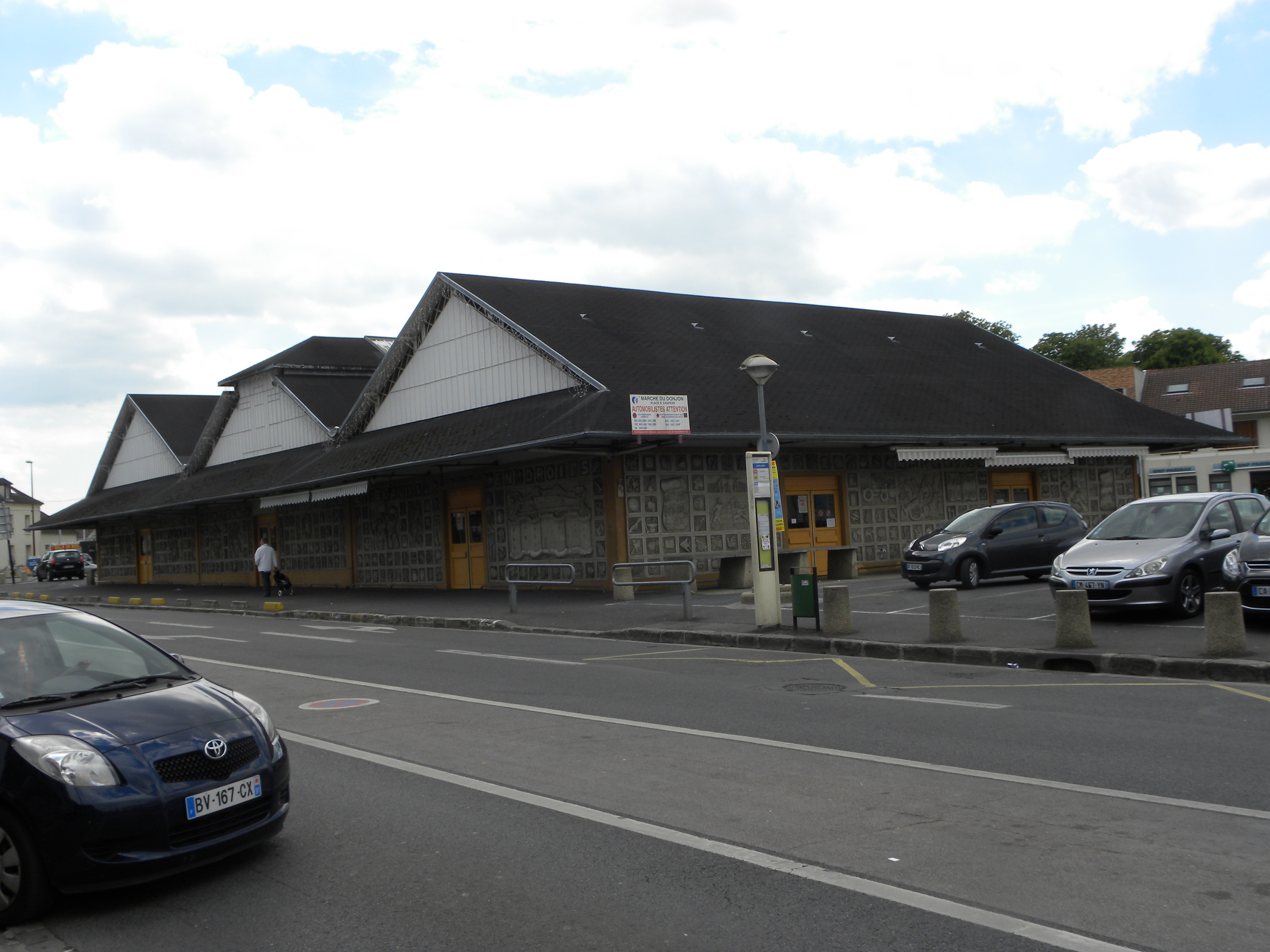
Public market

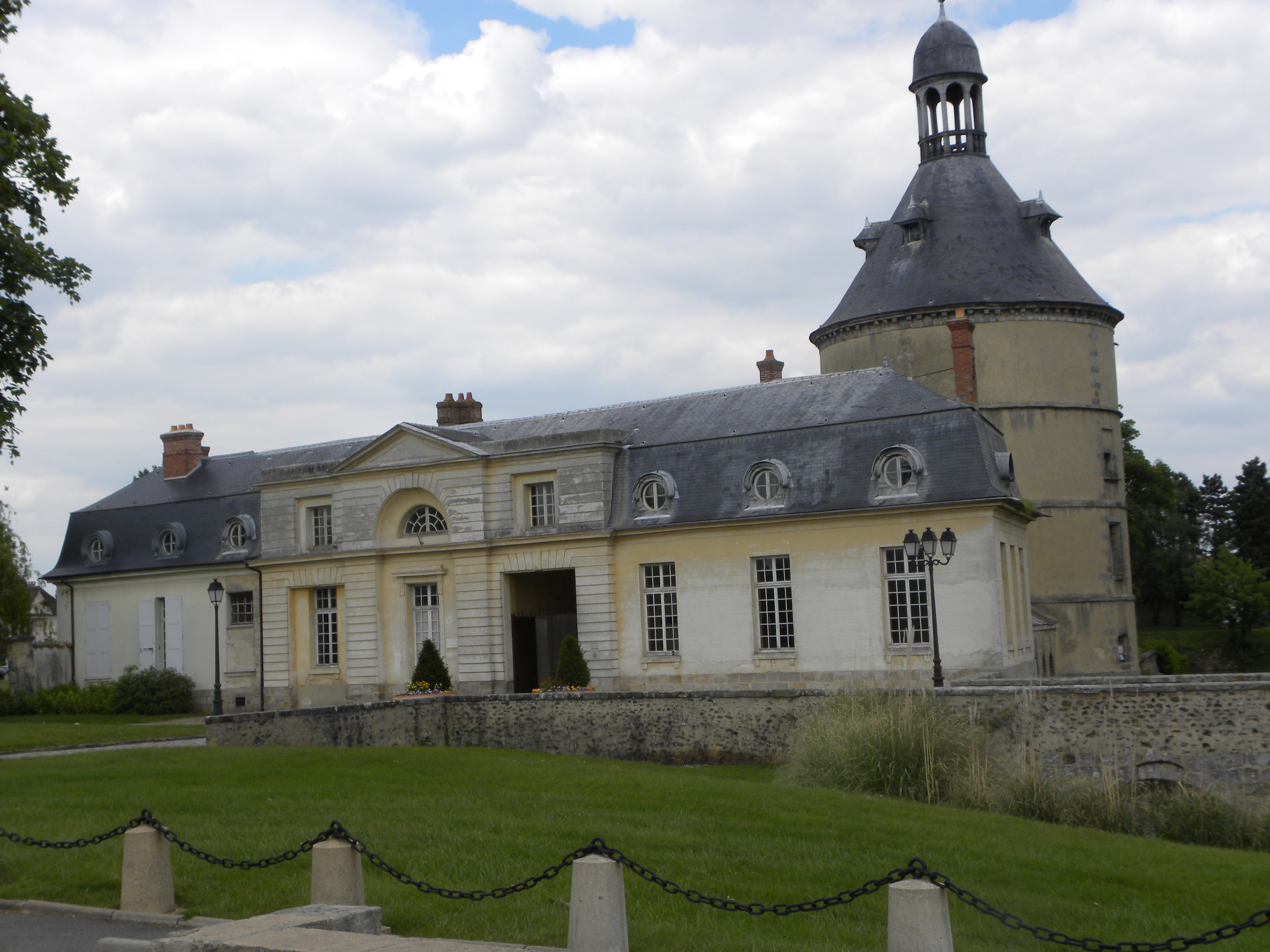
Château and Donjon

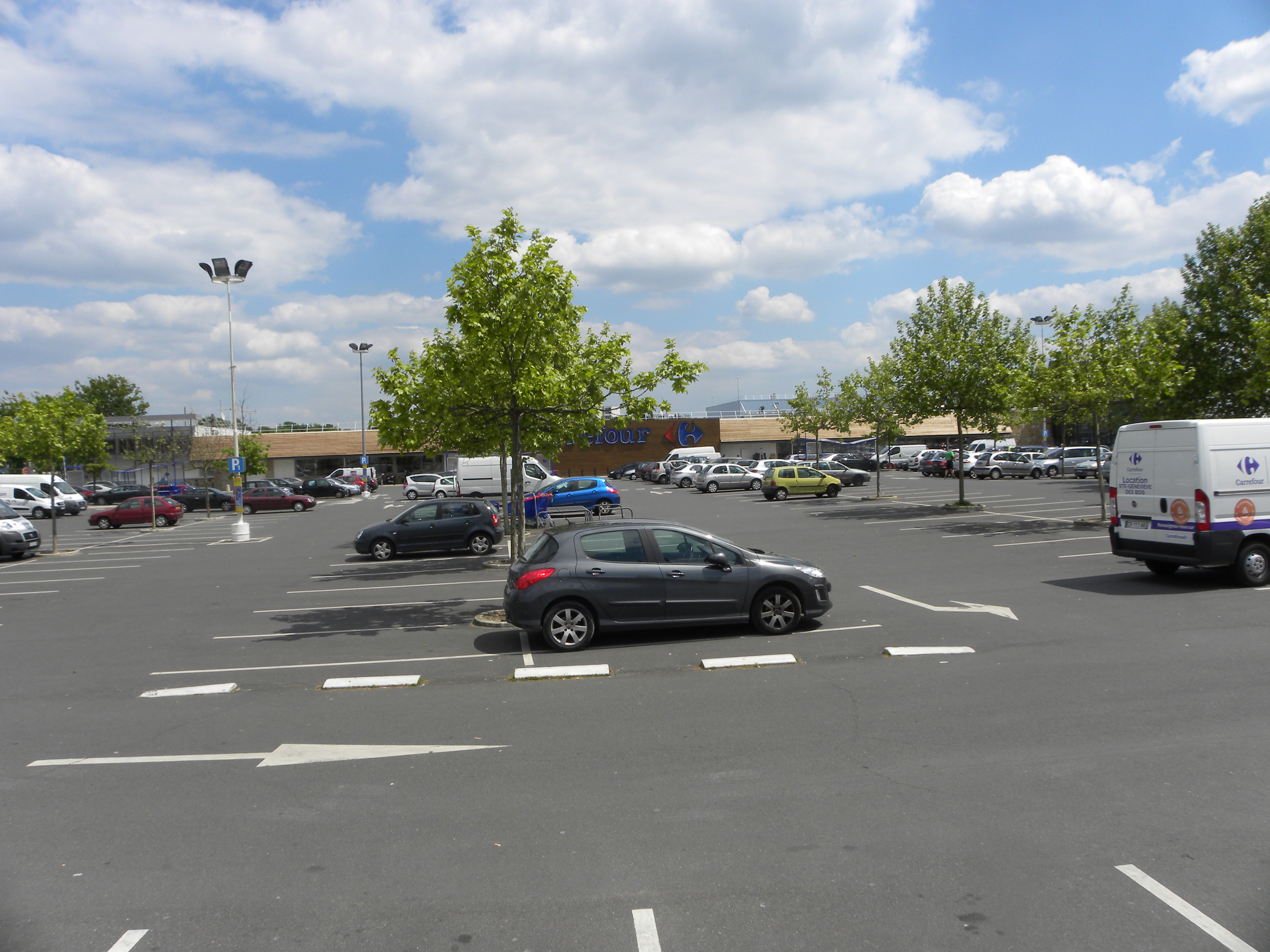
The first Carrefour hypermarket

== Twin towns – sister cities ==
Sainte-Geneviève-des-Bois is twinned with:

- Mikołów, Poland
- Obertshausen, Germany
- Penafiel, Portugal

== See also ==
- Communes of the Essonne department
