= Hôtel de Ville, Sainte-Geneviève-des-Bois =

Town hall in Sainte-Geneviève-des-Bois, France

Hôtel de Ville
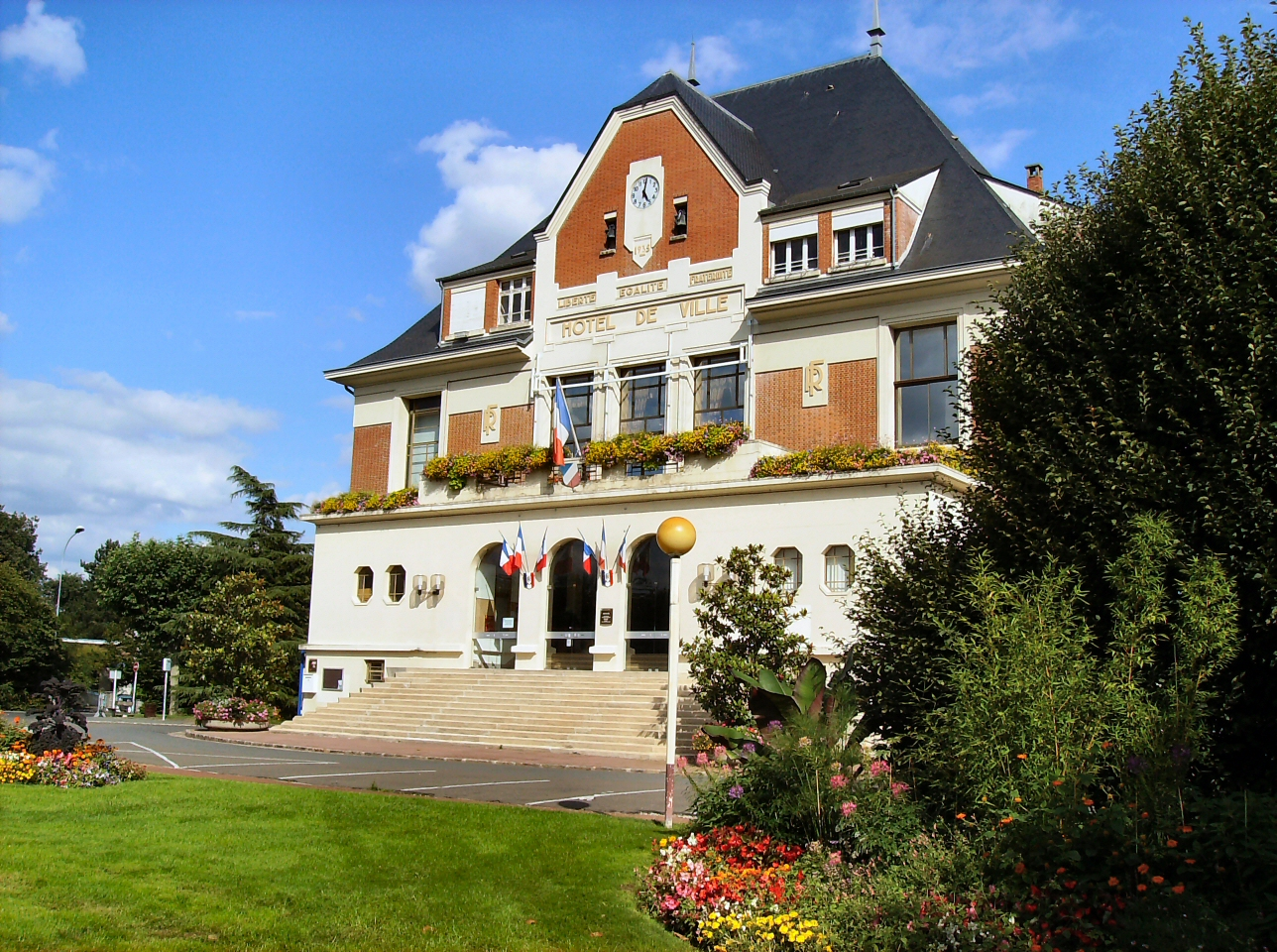
- The main frontage of the Hôtel de Ville in August 2008
- Interactive map of the Hôtel de Ville area

General information
- Type: City hall
- Architectural style: Neoclassical style
- Location: Sainte-Geneviève-des-Bois, France
- Coordinates: 48.6406°N 2.3269°E
- Completed: 1936

Design and construction
- Architect: René Guignard

The Hôtel de Ville (French pronunciation: [otɛl də vil], City Hall) is a municipal building in Sainte-Geneviève-des-Bois, Essonne, in the southern suburbs of Paris, standing on Place Roger Perriaud.

== History ==
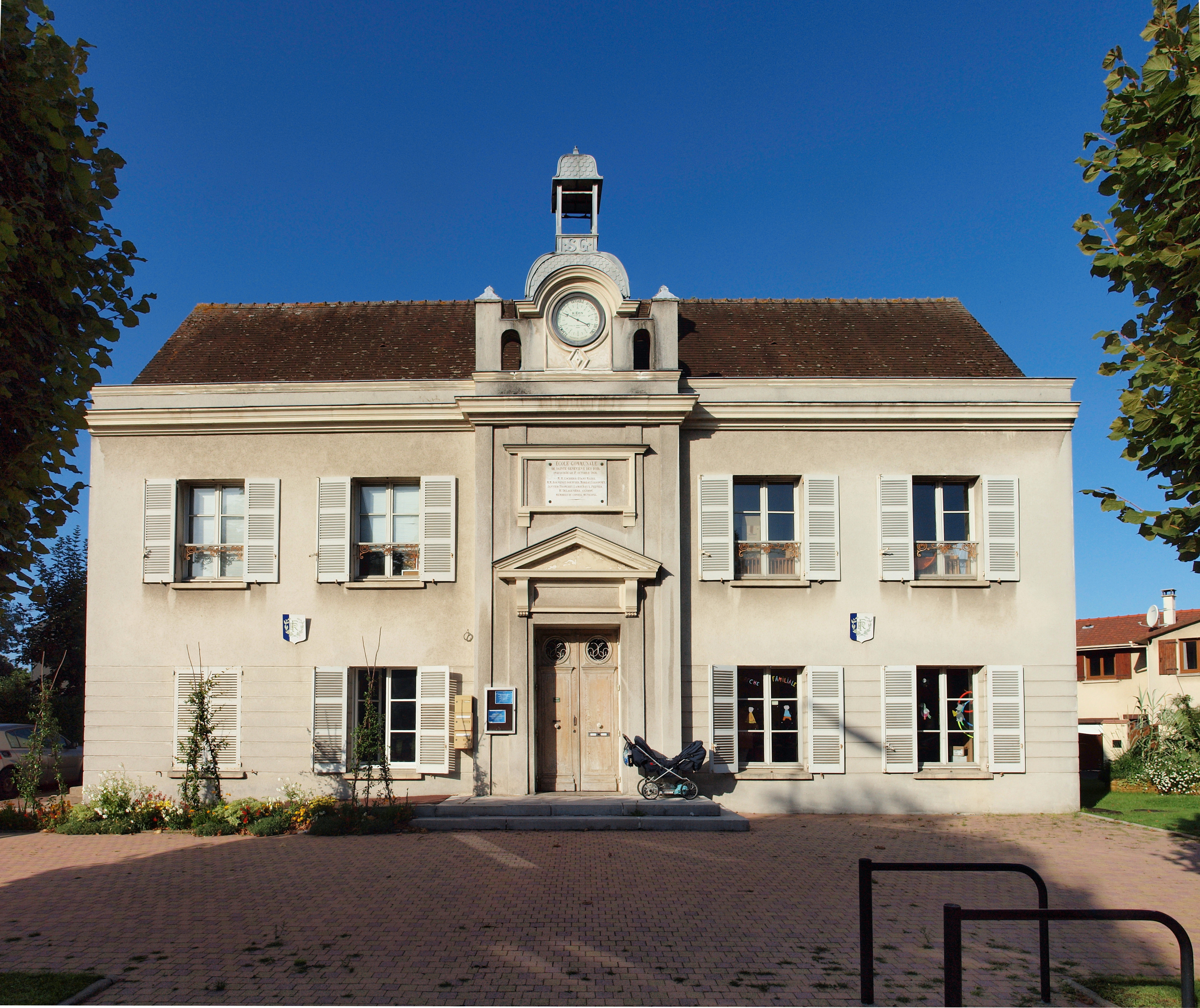
The old town hall

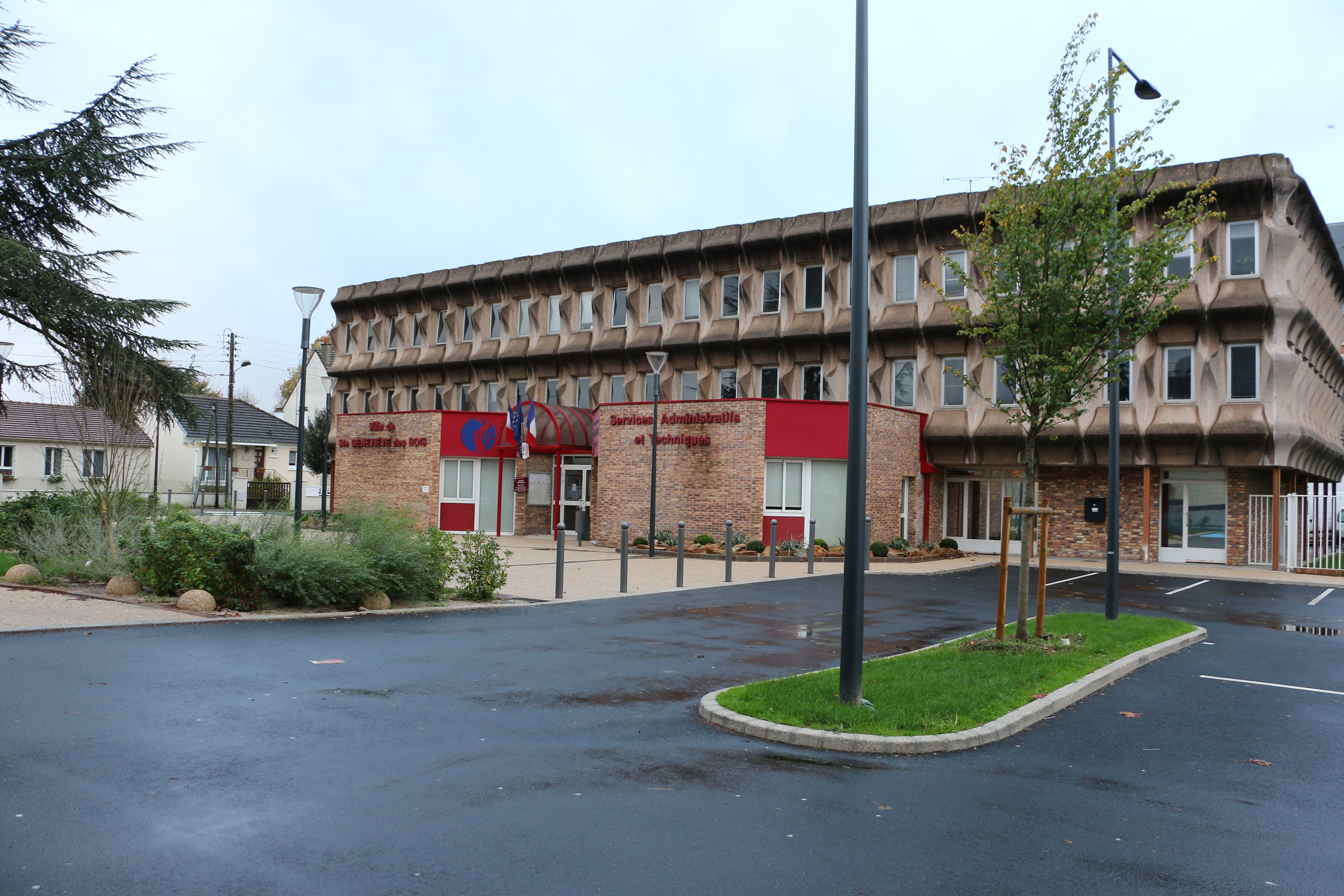
The mairie-annexe

After the French Revolution, meetings of the town council were initially held in the house of the mayor at the time. This arrangement continued into the 1830s under the mayor, Jean-Pierre Gouffier, who made a room available in his house on the west side of Route de Corbeil. Following Gouffier's death in 1839, the council acquired the property from his family and converted it for use as a town hall. The design involved a symmetrical main frontage of five bays facing onto the street. The central bay featured a doorway, with a moulded surround and a triangular pediment, and was blind on the first floor. The outer bays were fenestrated by casement windows with shutters. At roof level, there was a cornice, a small parapet and, above the central bay, a barometer which was flanked by pilasters supporting a small belfry.

In October 1868, under an initiative by the then mayor, Hippolyte Cocheris, a school was established in the building and a plaque was installed on the blind section above the doorway to commemorate the event.

In the early 1930s, following significant population growth, the council decided to commission a more substantial town hall. The site they selected formed part of the grounds of the former Château de Sainte-Geneviève-des-Bois, of which the main surviving part is a 14th century keep.

The new building was designed by René Guignard in the neoclassical style, built in red brick with a concrete frame and was officially opened by the mayor, Jean Moreau, in 1936. This imposing building was considered excessive, relative to the small size of the commune, at the time. The design involved a symmetrical main frontage of five bays facing onto what is now Place Roger Perriaud. The ground floor, which was slightly projected forward and cement rendered, featured a flight of steps leading up to a group of three round headed openings, with a pair of hexagonal windows at each end. On the first floor, there was a group of three casement windows, with a further casement window at each end. At attic level, there was a truncated gable, containing a clock, with a pair of tripartite windows on either side. Internally, the principal room was the Salle du Conseil (council chamber), which contained a mural painted by Raimon Ménager and five other painters, who became the founders of the Société des Artistes du Hurepoix, which continues to exist as a local cultural organisation.

During the Second World War, one of the councillors, Maxime Négro, was arrested on account of his communist sympathies and was incarcerated first at Pithiviers internment camp and later at Voves internment camp. Some eight months after the liberation of the town by American troops on 24 August 1944, Négro was back at the town hall to be elected mayor.

The mairie-annexe (annex to the town hall), also referred to as the pôle administratif (administrative centre), was designed by Pierre Wansart, built in concrete and erected behind the existing building in 1973. It had a rectangular layout with a pair of single-storey hexagonal projections. The first and second floors were fenestrated with a series of windows recessed into concrete moulds.
