= Villemoisson-sur-Orge =

Commune in Île-de-France, France

- Commune
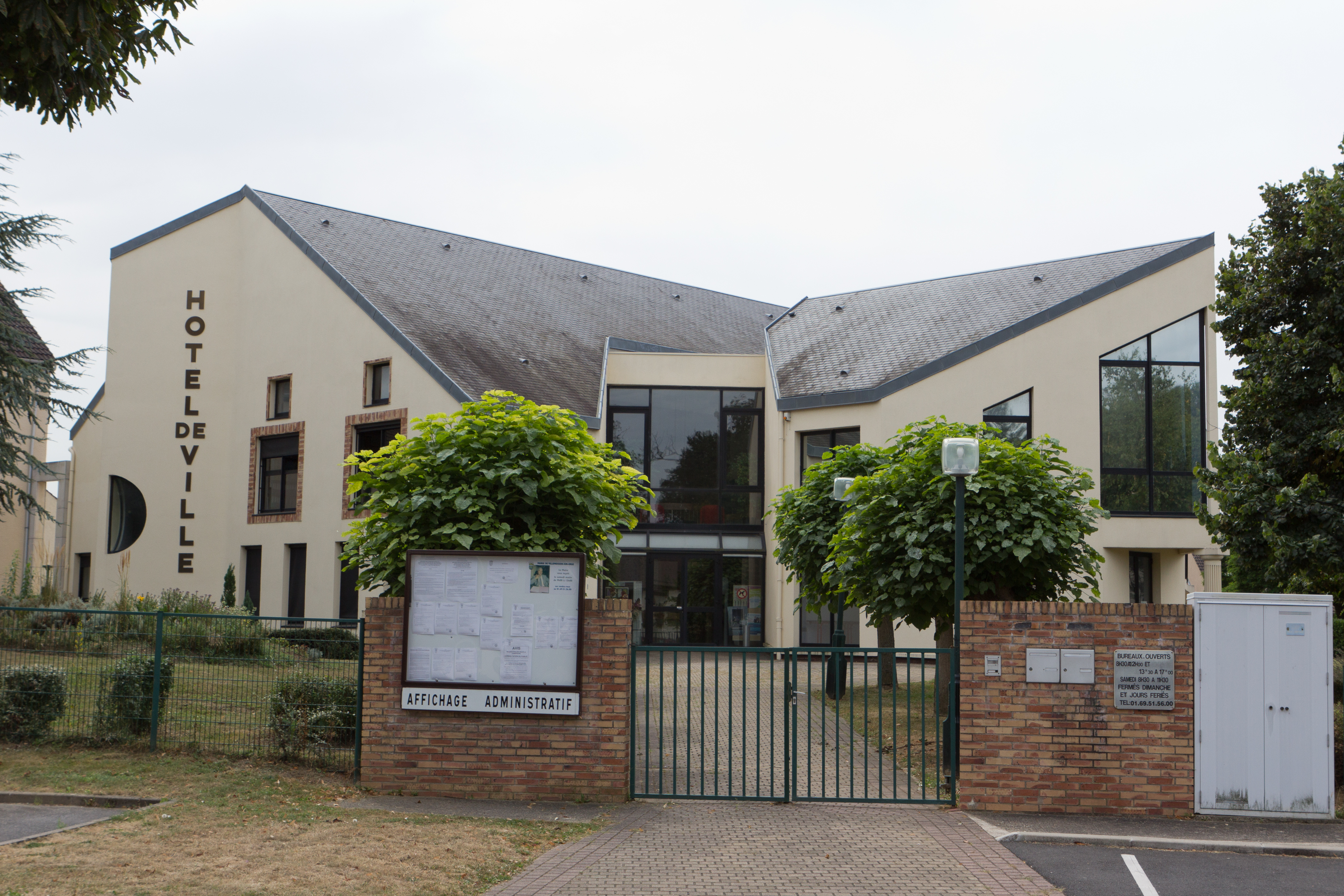
- The town hall in Villemoisson-sur-Orge

- Coat of arms
- Location of Villemoisson-sur-Orge
- Location within France Location within Île-de-France (region)
- Coordinates: 48°39′42″N 2°19′47″E
- Country: France
- Region: Île-de-France
- Department: Essonne
- Arrondissement: Palaiseau
- Canton: Sainte-Geneviève-des-Bois
- Intercommunality: CA Cœur d'Essonne

Government
  - Mayor (2020–2026): François Cholley
- Area^{1}: 2.31 km^{2} (0.89 sq mi)
- Highest elevation: 79 m (259 ft)
- Lowest elevation: 36 m (118 ft)
- Population (2023): 7,332
  - Density: 3,170/km^{2} (8,220/sq mi)
- Time zone: UTC+01:00 (CET)
  - Summer (DST): UTC+02:00 (CEST)
- INSEE/Postal code: 91667 /91360
- ^{1} French Land Register data, which excludes lakes, ponds, glaciers > 1 km^{2} (0.386 sq mi or 247 acres) and river estuaries.

Villemoisson-sur-Orge (French pronunciation: [vilmwasɔ̃ syʁ ɔʁʒ], literally Villemoisson on Orge) is a commune in the Essonne department in Île-de-France in northern France.

== Population ==
Inhabitants of Villemoisson-sur-Orge are known as Villemoissonnais in French.

Historical population
Year	Pop.	±% p.a.
1968	3,404	—
1975	4,050	+2.51%
1982	4,104	+0.19%
1990	6,404	+5.72%
1999	6,878	+0.80%
2007	6,879	+0.00%
2012	7,003	+0.36%
2017	6,996	−0.02%
2023	7,332	+0.78%
Source: INSEE

== See also ==
- Communes of the Essonne department
