= Hôtel de Ville, Morsang-sur-Orge =

Town hall in Morsang-sur-Orge, France

Hôtel de Ville
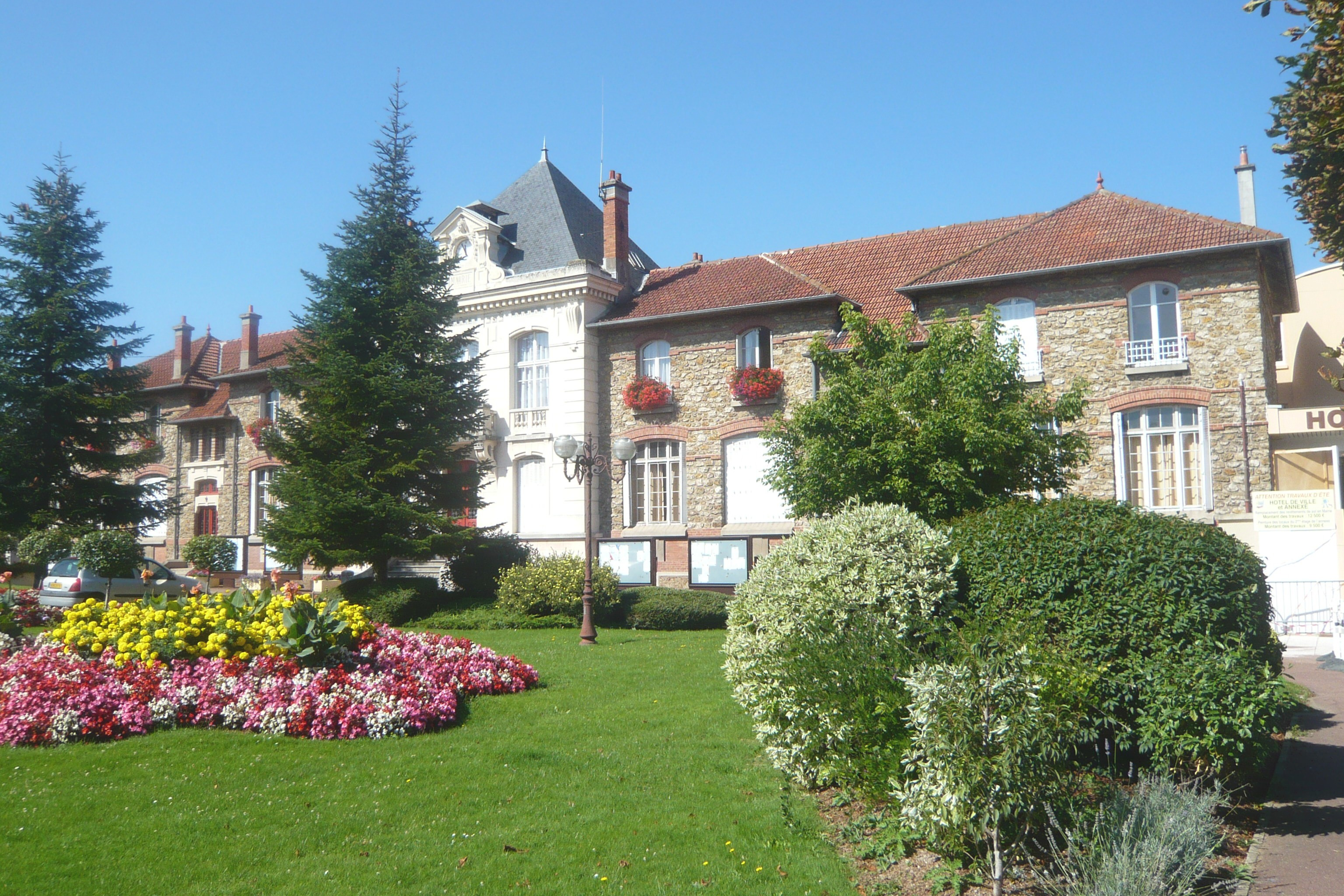
- The main frontage of the Hôtel de Ville in September 2010

General information
- Type: City hall
- Architectural style: Neoclassical style
- Location: Morsang-sur-Orge, France
- Coordinates: 48.6618°N 2.3461°E
- Completed: 1921

The Hôtel de Ville (French pronunciation: [otɛl də vil], City Hall) is a municipal building in Morsang-sur-Orge, Essonne, in the southern suburbs of Paris, standing on Square Alexandre-Christophe.

== History ==
The old town hall (in the centre of the picture)

=== The old town hall ===
Following the French Revolution, the new town council initially met in the home of the mayor at the time. This arrangement continued until 1846, when the council led by the mayor, Jean-François Postolle, decided to commission a combined town hall and school. This decision was necessitated by the difficulties of teaching in a dilapidated out-building belonging to the Church of Saint-Jean-Baptiste. The site they selected for the new building was on the north side of Grand Rue (now Rue Jean Raynal). The new building was designed in the neoclassical style, built in ashlar stone and was officially opened in 1848.

The design involved a symmetrical main frontage of five bays facing onto the street. The central bay contained a doorway and the building was fenestrated by casement windows on both floors. The municipal offices were on the ground floor, and the classroom was on the first floor.

=== The current town hall ===
In 1906, following significant population growth, the council led by the mayor, Louis Félix Périn, started to consider options for a more substantial combined town hall and school. The site they selected was 350 metres (1,150 ft) to the southwest along Grand Rue (now Rue Jean Raynal). The foundation stone was laid on 19 April 1914. However, progress was slow because of the advent of the First World War. The new building was designed in the neoclassical style, built in a mixture of ashlar stone and rubble masonry and was completed in 1921.

The design involved a symmetrical main frontage of 13 bays facing onto what is now Square Alexandre-Christophe. The building was laid out in three parts, with the town hall in the central block, the girls' school in the left-hand wing and the boys' school in the right-hand wing. The central block of three bays was built in ashlar stone, while the wings of five bays each were built in rubble masonry. The central block featured a short flight of steps leading up to a segmental-headed doorway with keystones flanked by two segmental-headed windows with keystones. On the first floor, there was a segmental-headed French door with a balustraded balcony flanked by two more segmental-headed windows and, at roof level, there was a clock above the central bay. Internally, the principal room was the Salle des Mariages (wedding room).

On 22 August 1944, during the Second World War, the caretaker of the Propriété Lacroix walked into the town hall and reported that shots had been fired in the local park. This led to the discovery of the bodies of two members of the French Resistance and one civilian who had been executed by German troops. This was only two days before the town was liberated on 24 August 1944.

In June 2016, a mother wanting to regain custody of her children held a council officer hostage with a handgun in the town hall. Police were called and the matter was later resolved.
