= Morsang-sur-Orge =

Commune in Île-de-France, France

- Commune
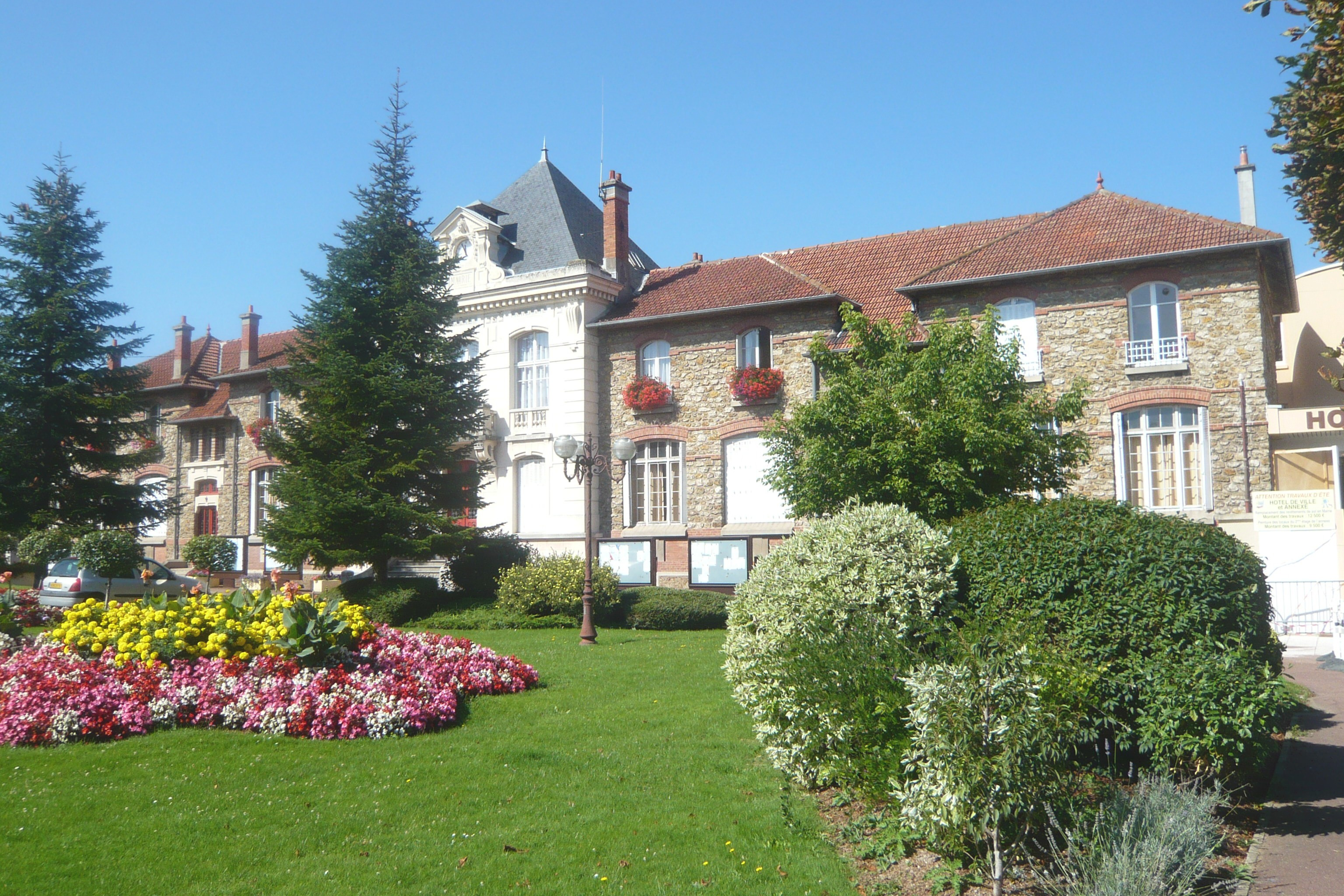
- The Hôtel de Ville

- Coat of arms

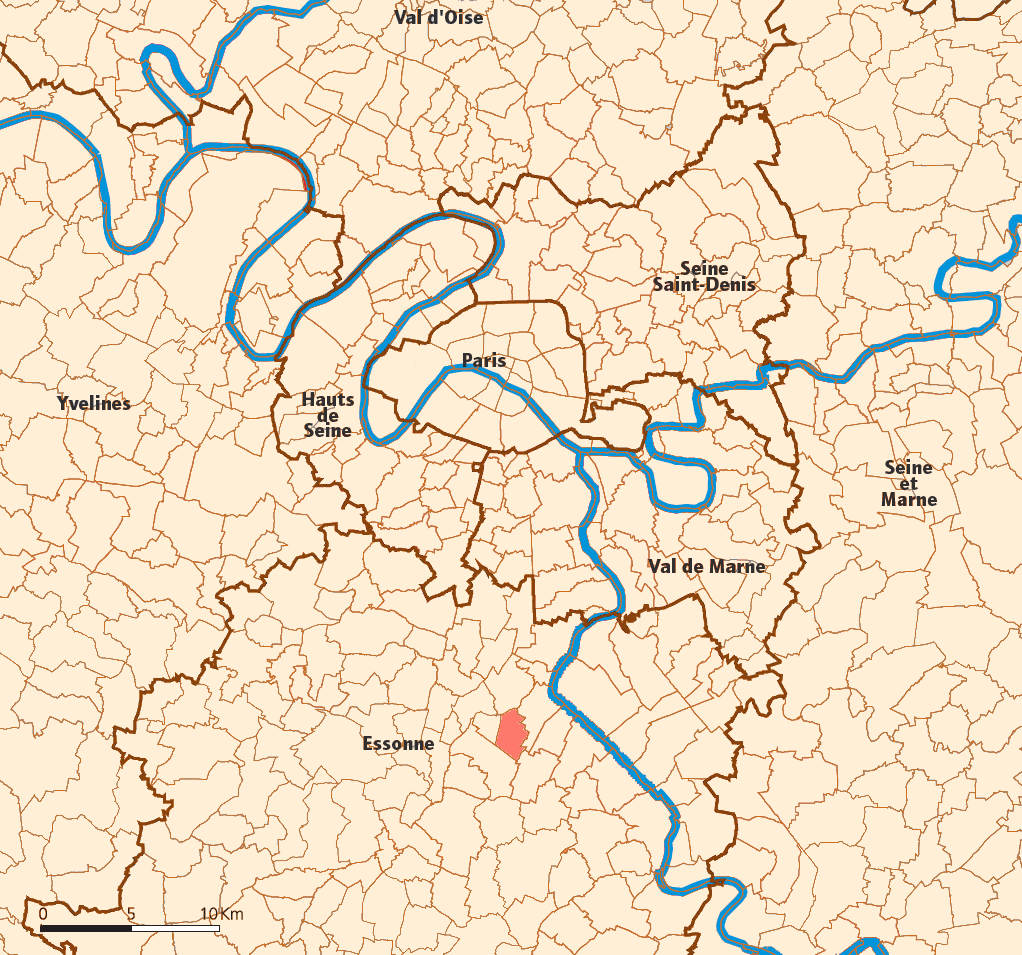
- Location (in red) within Paris inner and outer suburbs
- Location of Morsang-sur-Orge
- Location within France Location within Île-de-France (region)
- Coordinates: 48°39′42″N 2°20′46″E
- Country: France
- Region: Île-de-France
- Department: Essonne
- Arrondissement: Évry
- Canton: Sainte-Geneviève-des-Bois
- Intercommunality: CA Cœur d'Essonne

Government
  - Mayor (2020–2026): Marianne Duranton
- Area^{1}: 4.39 km^{2} (1.69 sq mi)
- Highest elevation: 81 m (266 ft)
- Lowest elevation: 36 m (118 ft)
- Population (2023): 21,667
  - Density: 4,940/km^{2} (12,800/sq mi)
- Demonym: Morsaintois
- Time zone: UTC+01:00 (CET)
  - Summer (DST): UTC+02:00 (CEST)
- INSEE/Postal code: 91434 /91390
- Website: www.morsang.fr
- ^{1} French Land Register data, which excludes lakes, ponds, glaciers > 1 km^{2} (0.386 sq mi or 247 acres) and river estuaries.

Morsang-sur-Orge (French pronunciation: [mɔʁsɑ̃ syʁ ɔʁʒ]; lit. 'Morsang-on-Orge') is a commune in the southern outer suburbs of Paris, France. It is located in the Essonne department, 21.2 km (13.2 mi) from the centre of Paris.

== History ==
The Hôtel de Ville was completed in 1921.

== Population ==
Inhabitants of Morsang-sur-Orge are known as Morsaintois in French.

Historical population

Year	Pop.	±% p.a.
1793	325	—
1800	380	+2.26%
1806	386	+0.26%
1821	357	−0.52%
1831	404	+1.24%
1836	430	+1.26%
1841	481	+2.27%
1846	452	−1.24%
1851	428	−1.09%
1856	456	+1.28%
1861	520	+2.66%
1866	566	+1.71%
1872	574	+0.23%
1876	600	+1.11%
1881	651	+1.64%
1886	709	+1.72%
1891	892	+4.70%
1896	980	+1.90%
1901	1,023	+0.86%

Year	Pop.	±% p.a.
1906	973	−1.00%
1911	1,025	+1.05%
1921	1,092	+0.64%
1926	1,864	+11.29%
1931	2,799	+8.47%
1936	3,611	+5.23%
1946	3,011	−1.80%
1954	5,269	+7.25%
1962	8,604	+6.32%
1968	15,258	+10.02%
1975	20,156	+4.06%
1982	20,332	+0.12%
1990	19,401	−0.58%
1999	19,335	−0.04%
2007	21,165	+1.14%
2012	21,428	+0.25%
2017	20,909	−0.49%
2023	21,667	+0.60%

Source: EHESS and INSEE (1968-2023)

== Transport ==
Morsang-sur-Orge is served by no station of the Paris Métro, RER, or suburban rail network. The closest station to Morsang-sur-Orge is Savigny-sur-Orge station, which is approximately a 22-minute train journey from the center of Paris on the Paris RER line. This station is located in the neighboring commune of Savigny-sur-Orge, 1.6 km (0.99 mi) from the town center of Morsang-sur-Orge.

== See also ==
- Communes of the Essonne department
